= 2023–2025 Sundhnúkur eruptions =

Volcanic eruptions in Iceland

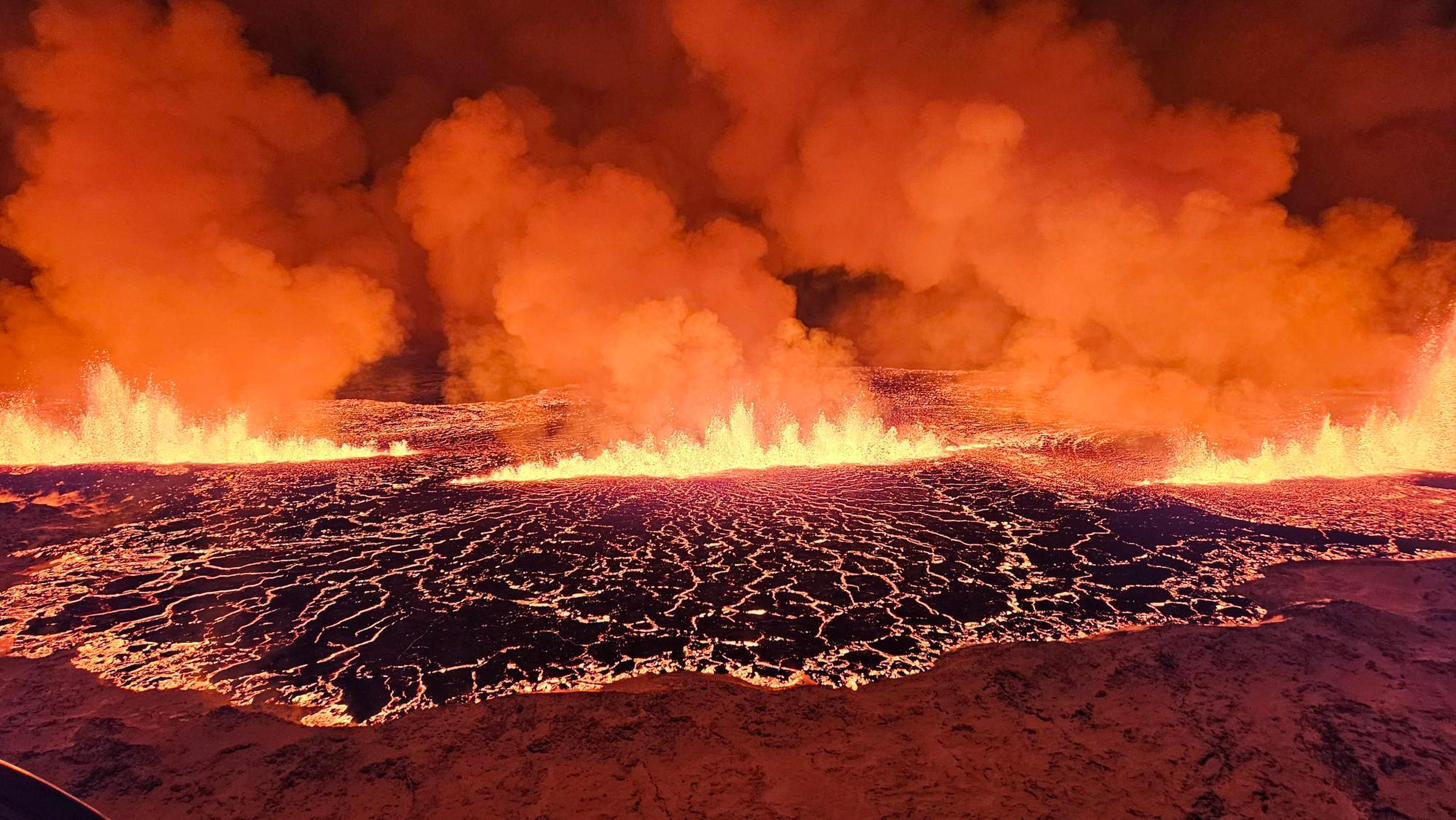
- Eruption of the Sundhnúksgígar crater chain, photographed by the Icelandic Meteorological Office on 18 December 2023
- Volcano: Eldvörp–Svartsengi
- Start date: 18 December 2023
- Start time: 22:17 UTC
- End date: 5 August 2025
- Type: Fissure eruption
- Location: Reykjanes Peninsula, Iceland; 63°52′45″N 22°23′14″W
- VEI: 1, 18 December 2023 – 8 December 2024
- Impact: Earthquakes, ground subsidence, lava fountains and lava flows; Grindavík heavily damaged and evacuated; damage to regional infrastructure; one presumed death from ground cracking

Maps
- Sundhnúkur eruptions location showing geological features Legend: Recent eruptive fissures of the Sundhnúkur eruptive series; Approximate extent of the Eldvörp–Svartsengi volcanic system; Inferred magma accumulation and uplift area; Calderas; Subglacial terrain above 1,100 m (3,600 ft); Central volcanoes; Seismically active areas, 1995–2007; Fissure swarms; Clicking on the rectangle enlarges the map and enables mouse-over detail

The 2023–2025 Sundhnúkur eruptions (Icelandic: Eldgosin við Sundhnúksgíga 2023–2025) are a series of volcanic eruptions on the Reykjanes Peninsula, near the town of Grindavík, Iceland. Nine eruptions have occurred since December 2023, with the most recent taking place in August 2025. The seismic and volcanic activity caused significant disruption across the western part of the peninsula, especially for the town of Grindavík. However, the Capital Region, including Reykjavík, has remained physically unaffected.

Volcanic activity began with an intense earthquake swarm in the Eldvörp–Svartsengi volcanic system on 24 October 2023, caused by a magmatic intrusion underneath the area. The frequency and intensity of the earthquakes dramatically increased on 10 November 2023, with around 20,000 tremors recorded by that time, the largest of which exceeded magnitude 5.3. Grindavík was evacuated due to the creation of large-scale subsidence, including the formation of an extensive graben valley, which caused significant damage. This extensional tectonic activity likely altered magma pathways and triggered subsequent eruptions.

The volcanic eruption series at the Sundhnúksgígar crater chain began on 18 December 2023, with an initial eruption that lasted for three days. This eruption was preceded by land uplift in the Svartsengi area, which subsequently deflated upon eruption, indicating the accumulation of magma at a depth of 4–5 km (2.5–3.1 mi) beneath Svartsengi. This magma source fed the initial eruption as well as all subsequent eruptions in the series. The second eruption occurred on 14 January 2024, lasting approximately two days. During this event, a fissure opened less than 100 m (330 ft) from the nearby town of Grindavík. The eruption breached anti-lava defences and destroyed three homes. Additionally, the eruption formed a new graben, although it was substantially less extensive than the one formed in November 2023. Tragically, just before this eruption, one person was reported missing and presumed to have fallen into a crack caused by seismic activity, resulting in their death. On 8 February 2024, the third eruption caused extensive damage, including the disruption of a hot-water pipeline from the Svartsengi power station. Although the eruption lasted only about two days, it resulted in a loss of hot water supply for several days across the Reykjanes Peninsula. The Capital Region, however, remained unaffected. The fourth eruption started on 16 March 2024 and became the longest in the series, spanning 54 days. A magmatic intrusion had occurred earlier in the month but did not reach the surface. The fifth eruption, which began on 29 May 2024, continued for 24 days. This eruption caused damage to power lines and cut off several road sections. On 22 August 2024, the sixth eruption commenced, lasting 14 days. It released 61 million m^{3} (2.2 billion cu ft) of lava, covering an area of 15.8 km^{2} (6.1 sq mi) and resulting in 40 cm (16 in) of land subsidence. Despite being the largest eruption in the series so far, it did not cause any infrastructure damage. The seventh eruption began on 20 November 2024 and extended over 18 days. It quickly engulfed the parking lot of the Blue Lagoon and threatened protective barriers in the area. The eighth eruption commenced on 1 April 2025 and concluded approximately seven hours later the same day, marking the shortest and least intense event in the eruptive series to date. In the days following the eruption, a substantial magmatic dike intruded underground without breaching the surface. The ninth eruption of the series commenced on 16 July 2025 and persisted for roughly 20 days. While it posed no threat to infrastructure, the gas pollution spread unusually far during the eruption's early stages and the measured pollution levels in nearby towns and cities were higher than those typically observed during the previous eruptions in the series.

Land uplift has resumed since the last eruption and is ongoing, with the current rate of vertical ground deformation lower than that observed before the previous eruption, although magmatic inflow into the magma chamber remains steady. Since March 2024, each eruption has been preceded by the accumulation of roughly 17–23 million m^{3} (600–810 million cu ft) of magma in the reservoir. By the end of November 2025, the interval since the previous eruption had become the longest recorded within the eruptive sequence that began in November 2023, exceeding 115 days since the conclusion of the July–August 2025 eruption. In mid-March 2026, the volume of magma beneath the area reached more than 23 million m^{3} (810 million cu ft), representing the highest threshold observed in the eruptive series to that point. As of 18 August 2026, the accumulated volume was estimated at between 28.3 million m^{3} (1,000 million cu ft) and 29.9 million m^{3} (1.06 billion cu ft), more than a year after the latest eruption in the series concluded. The Icelandic Meteorological Office considers a new magmatic intrusion to be more likely than not to occur, which may culminate in a volcanic eruption.

== Etymology ==
The name "Sundhnúkur" [ˈsʏnt.n̥ʏː.kʏr] literally translates to "passage peak". It is the highest point in the old crater row in the area, standing at 134 m (440 ft) above sea level. Historically, the name reflects the navigational challenges faced by sailors due to numerous rocks and skerries near the shore. Sundhnúkur served as a crucial visual marker for sailors navigating to the town of Grindavík, as its peak was visible from beyond the shore. Notably, the passage through the rocks is known by a different name, emphasising that Sundhnúkur specifically denotes the peak itself as a landmark rather than the passage. Sailors of the time also needed to be knowledgeable about various leading marks to safely reach the harbour. The term "Sundhnúksgígar" [ˈsʏnt.n̥ʏːks.ciː.ɣar], meaning "passage peak craters", was coined by geologist Jón Jónsson in 1974, highlighting the series of craters associated with this notable landmark.

== Background ==
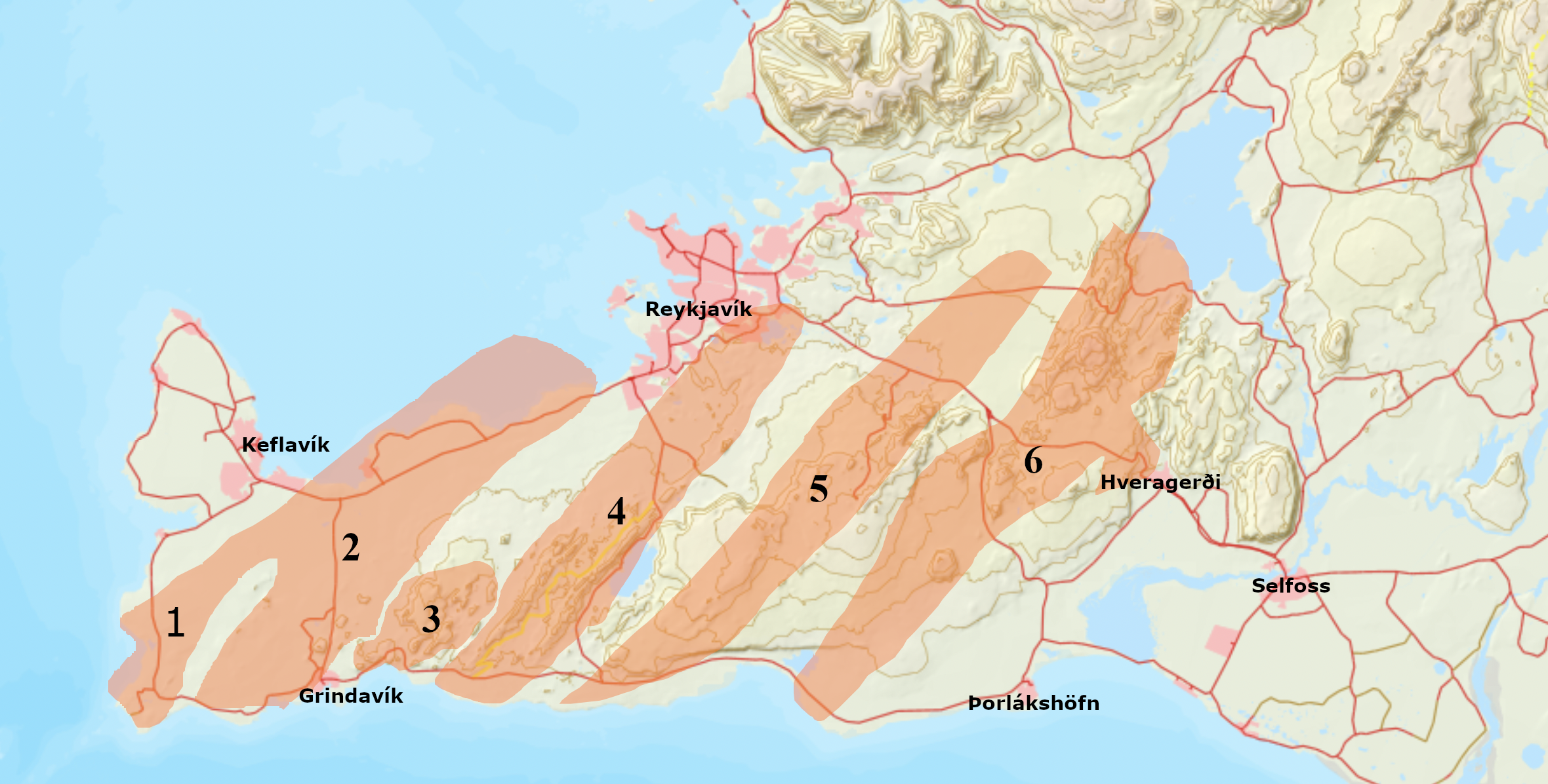
Map of volcanic systems on the Reykjanes Peninsula. Grindavík is at the south-western end of the Eldvörp–Svartsengi system (marked here as 2)

The Sundhnúksgígar crater row was formed approximately 2420 ± 100 radiocarbon years before present (BP), as determined by carbon-14 (^{14}C) dating conducted by Uppsala University, using 1950 as the baseline. This ancient lava flow was measured to cover an area of 25.77 km^{2} (9.95 sq mi) and has an estimated volume of at least 520 million m^{3} (18 billion cu ft). It originated from a crater row extending nearly 9 km (5.6 mi) in length. The crater row includes two named craters: Sundhnúkur and Melhóll [ˈmɛl.houːtl̥], with the latter situated nearly 2 km (1.2 mi) to the south-west of Sundhnúkur. The lava from this period was a mixture of pāhoehoe and ʻaʻā lava, indicative of varying eruption dynamics. Additionally, there are likely traces of an even older lava field beneath the circa 2400-year-old lava, though much of it has been obscured by the more recent eruption. The town of Grindavík is located along the south-western boundary of this ancient lava field. The most recent shield volcanoes to form in this particular area of the Reykjanes region were Sandfellshæð [ˈsant.fɛtl̥s.haiθ] and Þráinsskjöldur [ˈθrau.ɪns.scœl.tʏr̥], which emerged around 14,000 years ago. This volcanic activity was triggered by the retreat of glaciers at the conclusion of the last glacial period. As the ice melted, the Earth's crust underwent isostatic rebound, a process where the reduction in pressure allowed magma to rise more easily to the surface, initiating volcanic activity. Given these factors, it is considered highly unlikely that a shield volcano is currently forming in the region.

The Reykjanes [ˈreiː.ca.nɛs] Peninsula, located in south-western Iceland, has entered a new volcanic cycle after a period of approximately 800 years of relative inactivity. This resurgence was marked by heightened seismic events and volcanic activity near the hyaloclastite mountain Þorbjörn [ˈθɔr.pʲœrtn̥] beginning in late 2019. The preceding period of volcanic activity occurred between 780 and 1240 AD, with the final phase, known as the Reykjanes Fires, occurring between 1210 and 1240 AD. This phase resulted in the formation of one of the largest continuous lava fields in Iceland's historical record, Arnarseturshraun [ˌar.nar.ˈsɛt.ʏrs.r̥œyːn] and Eldvarpahraun [ˈɛlt.var̥.pa.r̥œyːn]. This activity was concentrated primarily west and north of Svartsengi [ˈsvar̥t.seiːŋ.ɡɪ] and Þorbjörn. Volcanic periods on the peninsula typically span 400 to 600 years, during which eruptions occur at six to seven distinct locations, including regions near the Capital Region. These periods are composed of multiple phases, each lasting from several years to several decades, typically interspersed with breaks between 100 and 150 years. Furthermore, volcanic activity may shift to different areas of the peninsula every 30 to 50 years. Based on historical patterns, the current cycle is expected to continue until approximately 2400–2600 CE.

Iceland frequently experiences earthquakes due to its position on the Mid-Atlantic Ridge, where the Eurasian and North American tectonic plates meet. However, the 2023 seismic swarm was unusually extensive and has been attributed to a roughly 15 km (9.3 mi) magmatic intrusion that originated south-west of Kálffellsheiði [ˈkaul.fɛtl̥s.ˌheiðɪ], followed the Sundhnúksgígar crater chain, and terminated offshore just beyond the town of Grindavík [ˈkrɪn.ta.viːk], reaching a shallowest depth of approximately 800 m (2,600 ft). The largest earthquakes originated beneath this crater chain, the strongest of which reached magnitude 5.3. This occurred in the Eldvörp–Svartsengi volcanic system, which has experienced 16 magmatic intrusions since January 2020 and 12 of them since October 2023. Nine of these intrusions have resulted in volcanic eruptions, whereas the others did not reach the surface. Previous volcanic unrest during this period had been predominantly associated with the Fagradalsfjall [ˈfaːɣ.ra.dals.fjatl̥] system, where three out of four magmatic intrusions led to eruptions. Since 2021, there have been 12 identified volcanic eruptions on the Reykjanes Peninsula.

== Earthquakes ==
=== October 2023 earthquakes ===
An intense earthquake swarm began near Svartsengi, north of Grindavík, on the night of 24 October 2023. By the morning of 25 October, the Icelandic Meteorological Office (IMO) had reported over 1,000 earthquakes, including events of magnitudes 3.9 and 4.5 at around 5 km (3.1 mi) depth. The swarm, interpreted as being triggered by stress changes related to previous intrusive magmatic activity on the Reykjanes Peninsula, continued through 26 and 27 October, with about 5,800 earthquakes recorded since its onset. On 28 October, ground uplift near Svartsengi, likely due to a magmatic intrusion, was detected, and by 29 October, deformation rates were higher than during similar events in 2020 and 2022. Seismic activity had decreased by 29 October, but over 7,000 earthquakes had occurred since the beginning of the swarm. On 30 October, GPS data confirmed that deformation was still ongoing, and modelling suggested that the magmatic intrusion was occurring at about 4 km (2.5 mi) depth, with around 1,300 earthquakes detected on the Reykjanes Peninsula in the previous 24 hours. On 31 October, an intense earthquake swarm beneath the mountain Þorbjörn, with a maximum magnitude of 3.7, indicated continued magma movement. IMO and Civil Defence closely monitored the situation, noting that rapid changes were possible, but that magma movements could also fade without leading to an eruption.

The first clear signs of a new magma intrusion near the Svartsengi area, located north-west of Þorbjörn on the Reykjanes Peninsula, were detected in late October 2023. This phenomenon, identified through the latest GPS data and InSAR images derived from satellite data, showed accelerated land uplift centred near the Blue Lagoon, approximately 1.5 km (0.93 mi) north-west of Þorbjörn. It was the fifth occurrence of such uplift in the area since 2020, suggesting increased pressure likely due to magma intrusion. The rapid uplift and associated fracturing raised the likelihood of renewed seismic activity in the area that could potentially allow magma to move closer to the Earth's surface. Geophysical models were used to estimate the depth and size of the intrusion, although experts emphasised that the unrest might still subside without producing a volcanic eruption.

=== November 2023 earthquakes ===
In November 2023, seismic activity around the mountain Þorbjörn remained intense, with over 800 earthquakes recorded on 1 November, including a magnitude 3.7 quake. GPS and satellite data confirmed ongoing uplift due to a magma intrusion at a depth of 4–5 km (2.5–3.1 mi) north-west of Mt. Þorbjörn in the Svartsengi area. On 2 November, approximately 400 earthquakes were recorded, with the largest being magnitude 2.8, continuing the seismic trend. By 3 November, a magnitude 4.3 earthquake occurred, and the area continued to experience significant seismic activity, though there were no clear signs of magma moving closer to the surface. Seismicity dropped on 4 November, but uplift continued, with rockfall risks from larger earthquakes. On 6 November, 1,300 earthquakes were detected, with uplift reaching 7 cm (2.8 in) since the start of the inflation, and magma inflow into a sill-type intrusion at around 5 km (3.1 mi) depth estimated at 7 m^{3}/s (250 cu ft/s). Seismic activity remained episodic, with another 900 earthquakes on 7 November. On 8 November, approximately 1,200 earthquakes were recorded, and magma accumulation persisted at 5 km (3.1 mi) depth north-west of Þorbjörn with no signs of surface eruption. On 9 November, seismic activity spiked, with 1,400 earthquakes and seven above magnitude 4.0, including a magnitude 4.8. Nearly 800 earthquakes occurred on 10 November, continuing the pattern of magma accumulation and seismic release, but IMO reported at that stage no clear indications that magma was forcing its way to the surface.

Around 15:00 UTC on 10 November 2023, a significant wave of seismic activity began approximately 3 km (1.9 mi) north-east of Grindavík. As a result, the civil protection phase was raised from Uncertainty Phase to Alert Phase later that afternoon. By 23:00 UTC, the Icelandic Meteorological Office (IMO) assessed that a magma intrusion had likely extended beneath the town. This event resulted from a substantial magmatic intrusion that spanned 15 km (9.3 mi), with its shallowest part less than about 1 km (0.62 mi) beneath the surface, and was likely fed by magma from a reservoir beneath Svartsengi. A state of emergency was declared shortly thereafter, and the evacuation of Grindavík commenced. The largest of the earthquakes to date reached magnitude 5.3 on 10 November 2023. By this time, over 22,000 earthquakes had been recorded since the beginning of the swarm in October 2023. The Icelandic Meteorological Office (IMO) predicted that an eruption was likely, stating that "it will take several days (rather than hours) for magma to reach the surface". The greatest extent of the magma intrusion was inferred to be around the Sundhnúksgígar crater chain, approximately 3.5 km (2.2 mi) north of Grindavík. A DOAS spectrometer on Húsafell [ˈhuːsaˌfɛtl̥] detected the presence of sulfur dioxide (SO_{2}) in the atmosphere on 13–14 November, indicating that magma was several hundred metres (a few thousand feet) below the surface. Although the number of earthquakes decreased somewhat since 10 November, the IMO was still recording between 700 and 1,000 earthquakes daily by 14 November.

Ground deformation sensors at Festarfjall [ˈfɛs.tar.fjatl̥] and the Svartsengi area recorded that the ground had moved apart by 120 cm (47 in). Satellite measurements recorded the subsidence depth of about 1 m (3 ft 3 in) over a swathe of land approximately 5 km long and 2 km wide (5 by 2 km (3.1 by 1.2 mi)), extending from the Sundhnúksgígar craters to the western side of Grindavík. The creation of this graben-like formation on 10 November has enabled scientists to estimate the volume of the magmatic intrusion, which formed in a remarkably short period of six hours, as approximately 70 million m^{3} (2.5 billion cu ft). Further analysis revealed that about 7,000 m^{3}/s (250,000 cu ft/s) flowed into this magma intrusion, providing valuable insights into the dynamics of volcanic processes and the scale of subsurface magma movement. It was estimated that the subsidence continued at a daily rate of about 4 cm (1.6 in) in the week following the disaster. A large crack opened up through the town, which old maps indicated was a reactivation of an existing fault. Scientists at the University of Iceland believe that the fault was created by the last Sundhnúksgígar eruption over 2,000 years ago.

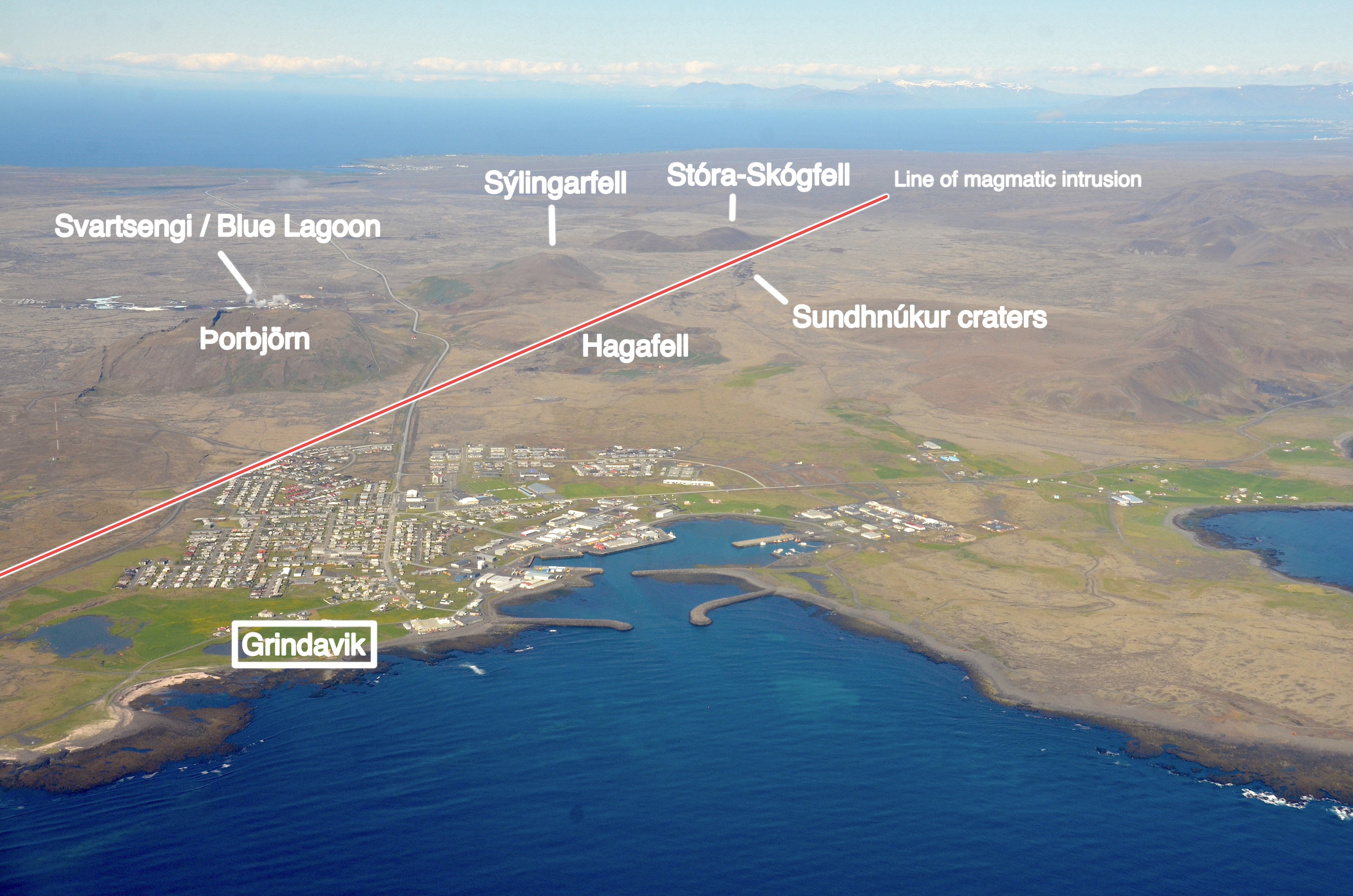
Annotated view of area involved in 2023 seismic disturbances

Sensors emplaced in a borehole in Svartsengi detected the presence of sulfur dioxide on 16 November 2023, a classic signature of magma close to the surface. This led the IMO to conclude that the area around the volcanic edifice of Hagafell [ˈhaː.ɣa.fɛtl̥], approximately 2 km (1.2 mi) north of Grindavík, was at the highest level of risk. A rapid 3 cm (1.2 in) uplift of the ground in the Svartsengi area was recorded from 18 to 21 November, likely indicating an upwelling of magma from a source 5 or more km (3.1 or more mi) below the ground. An eruption was still regarded as likely on 21 November, but as seismic activity declined from 24 November, that likelihood also began to decline.

In November 2023, Benedikt Ófeigsson, a geophysicist at the IMO, posited that Fagradalsfjall, rather than Svartsengi, might be the source of volcanic activity near Grindavík, noting the difficulty in assessing the activity's depth, location, and magma volume amidst seismic disturbances. He anticipated that InSAR satellite imagery would clarify these uncertainties. Supporting Benedikt's hypothesis, Freysteinn Sigmundsson from the University of Iceland, in February 2024, observed that minor seismic activity near Fagradalsfjall indicated potential magma movement, hinting at a possible eruption. He highlighted the magma's potential new pathways, particularly its shift towards the Svartsengi system and the persistent pressure in Fagradalsfjall post-eruption. Additional evidence bolstering the theory came from the pattern of land uplift in these systems. In Fagradalsfjall, an uplift began following the end of volcanic activity in early August 2023 and persisted until the end of October 2023. Notably, as this intrusion concluded in Fagradalsfjall, a fresh phase of land uplift initiated in Svartsengi around the same time. Scientists from Uppsala University appeared to have confirmed the theory proposed by their counterparts at the University of Iceland.

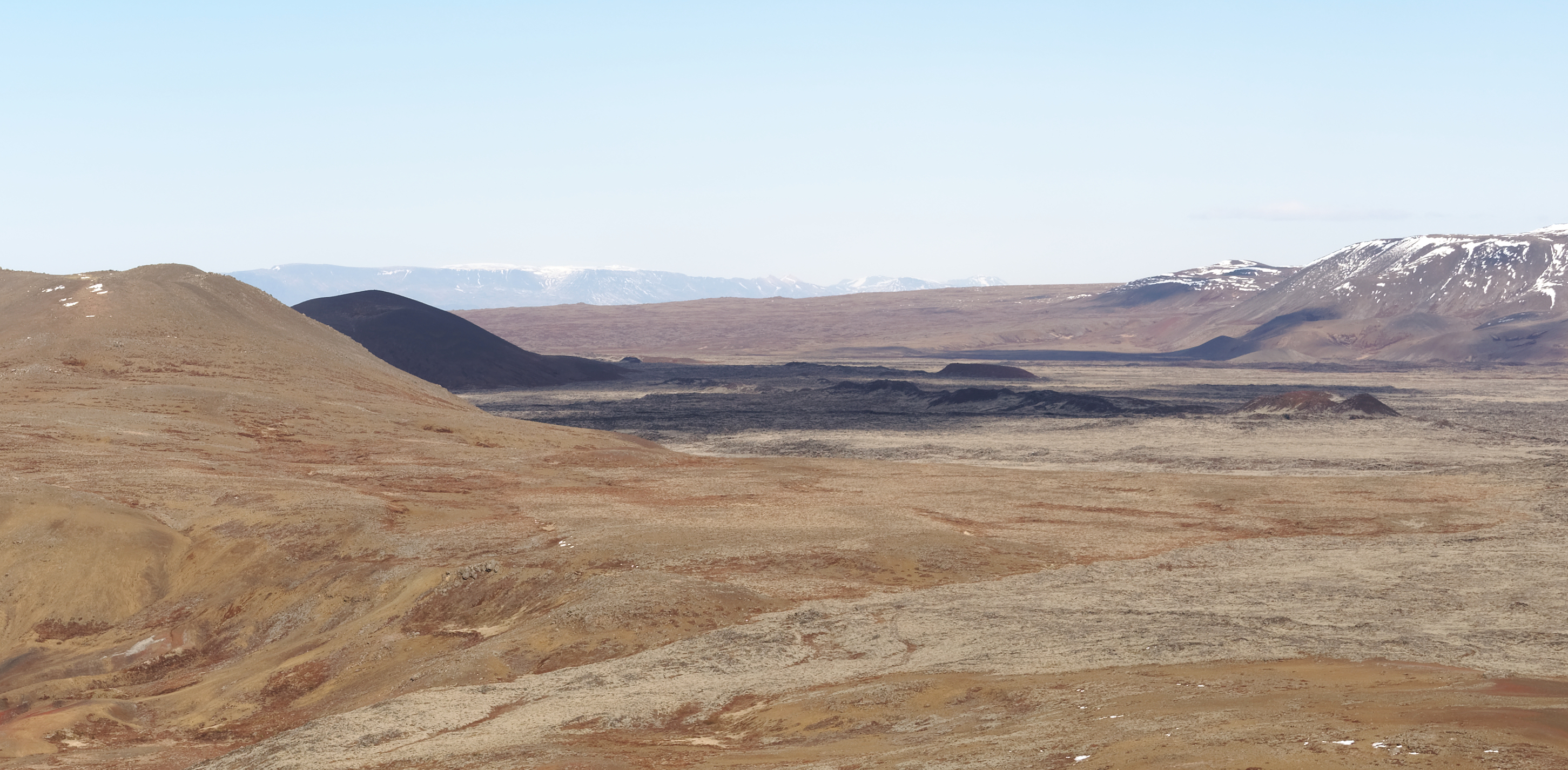
Sundhnúksgígar craters seen from the south-west

According to Professor Magnús Tumi Guðmundsson, a geophysicist at the University of Iceland, the magma channel, approximately 2 m (6 ft 7 in) wide, had undergone rapid solidification. Approximately 90% of the magma solidified within 10 to 15 days following the subsidence in November 2023, due to the cold nature of the Earth's crust. However, some magma near Sundhnúksgígar remained, posing potential risks for further activity due to the possibility of increased underground pressure. Magnús noted that while magma generally cools quickly, the surrounding rock stays hot and weak, maintaining a state of geological vulnerability in the area for several months, necessitating ongoing caution and monitoring. If an eruption were to occur, it was most likely to take place in the area between Sýlingarfell [ˈsiːlɪŋk.ar.fɛtl̥] and Hagafell mountains. Over the span of several weeks, the possibility of an eruption in Eldvörp [ˈɛlt.vœr̥p], north-east of Grindavík, was also being monitored.

Significant land movements were recorded around the Svartsengi area during the subsidence, with a displacement of about 100 cm (39 in) to the west and 25 cm (9.8 in) to the north. During the evacuation of Grindavík on 10 November, the ground near Svartsengi initially descended by 35 cm (14 in) and subsequently rose by 25 cm (9.8 in). A GPS station at Festarfjall, situated east of Grindavík, underwent a shift of 60 cm (24 in) eastward and 40 cm (16 in) southward, along with an upward movement of 12 cm (4.7 in). On the same day, the GPS station in Grindavík, located directly above the magma conduit, moved 30 cm (12 in) eastward while dropping 100 cm (39 in), with an additional sinking of 20 cm (7.9 in) occurring in the following days.

=== December 2023 earthquakes ===
In December 2023, seismic activity around the Svartsengi area had remained weak, with micro-earthquakes concentrated near Hagafell. By 6 December, geodetic modelling suggested that magma inflow to the dike formed on 10 November 2023 had likely ceased, significantly decreasing the chances of an eruption along that dike. However, magma accumulation beneath Svartsengi continued, keeping the possibility of further dikes or an eruption alive. Inflation in Svartsengi persisted, though at a slightly reduced rate by 13 December 2023, still higher than before the November dike. Seismic activity remained low, with weak activity mostly around Hagafell. On 15 December 460 earthquakes were recorded, with 30 greater than magnitude 1.0, and the largest being magnitude 2.8 near Hagafell. Uplift around Svartsengi continued, indicating ongoing magma accumulation. A hazard map from 6 December remained valid until 20 December, but conditions were subject to rapid change. As of 16 December, it was too early to say whether magma accumulation at Svartsengi had stopped and the inflation was over, and scientists would continue analysing data, with a new hazard map scheduled for 20 December.

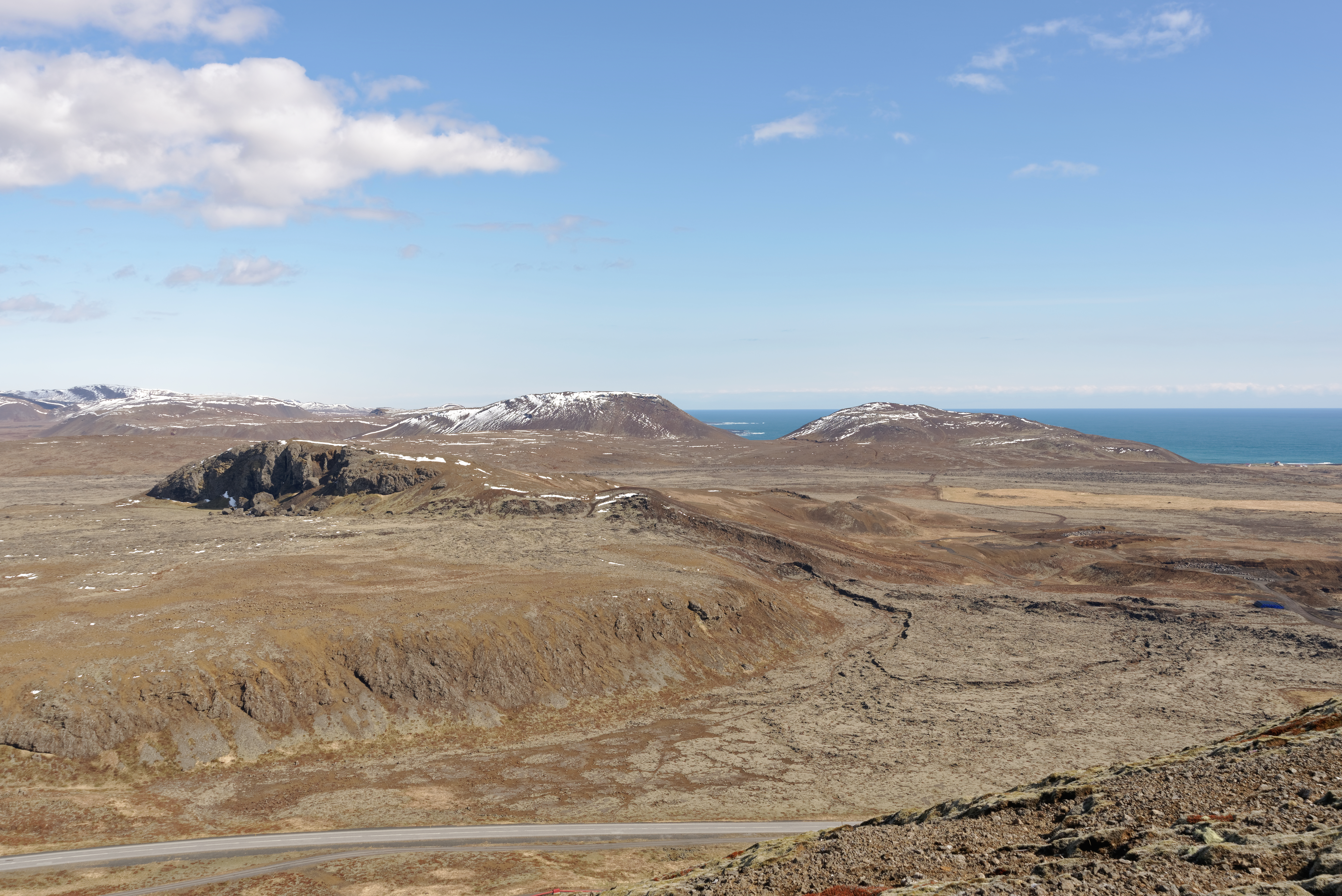
Hagafell (left foreground), viewed from Þorbjörn

It was determined that the magma accumulating beneath Svartsengi was most likely feeding the dike beneath Grindavík, oriented along the approximately 15 km (9.3 mi) Sundhnúksgígar crater chain, where the magma intrusion occurred. Deformations are still being measured at stations near the dike, but these are now mainly interpreted as due to the land uplift occurring at Svartsengi. At the beginning of December 2023, recent GPS data from the Icelandic Meteorological Office (IMO) showed that the land had risen above its level prior to the start of the earthquake series at the end of October 2023. Professor Þorvaldur Þórðarson, a volcanology expert from the University of Iceland, theorised that this elevation could be attributed to a combination of tectonic movements and magma build-up. Notably, the pronounced terrestrial shifts on 10 November 2023 may have facilitated the migration of magma from deeper reservoirs to more superficial ones.

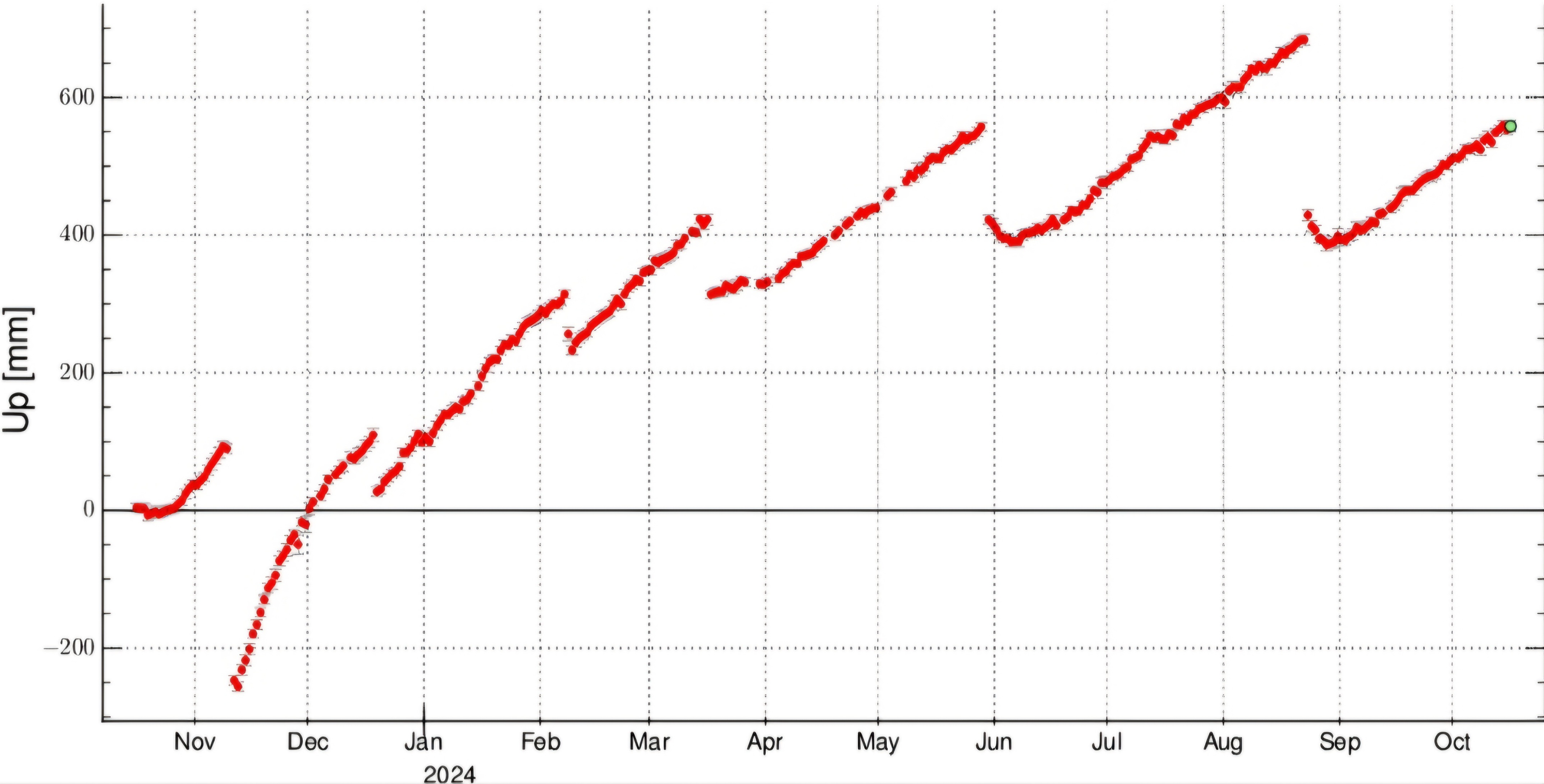
A graph from the GPS station in Svartsengi showing vertical ground movement in millimetres between October 2023 and October 2024

In the weeks following the subsidence, the volcanic activity at Svartsengi entered a new phase with increased chances of magma propagation and potential eruptions. The observed pattern suggested a possible repetition of events, where magma accumulating beneath Svartsengi feeds a dike beneath Grindavík and north-east towards Sundhnúksgígar, similar to the one formed on 10 November. At the beginning of December 2023, magma was estimated to be accumulating in the chamber under Svartsengi at a rate comparable to the discharge of the Elliðaár rivers in Reykjavík, or on the order of several cubic m/s (a few hundred cubic ft/s). The magma was believed to be located at a depth of about 5–6 km (3.1–3.7 mi). The rate of magma inflow from the Earth's mantle into the magma chamber beneath Svartsengi has steadily but gradually decreased since the beginning of the eruptive series and is currently estimated at 1 m^{3}/s (35 cu ft/s).

The recent seismic trends at Svartsengi, characterised by varying intensities and a concentration of activity along a dike, closely resembled the seismic and volcanic patterns experienced during the Krafla Fires, which began in 1975. During this prolonged eruptive series, spanning nearly nine years, the region experienced 20 distinct magma intrusions, nine of which resulted in eruptions. These events were marked by varying magma volumes feeding the same dike, leading to different eruption scales. The intervals between eruptions also varied considerably, with nearly three years separating some eruptions. In Svartsengi, geodetic data showed a similar pattern of reduced magma volumes compared to levels observed before the 10 November 2023 dike intrusion, parallelling the smaller magma accumulations at Krafla that were sufficient to trigger new propagations and subsequent eruptions.

From the beginning of the earthquakes until 10 November, the land at Svartsengi elevated by more than 10 cm (3.9 in) within a span of 16 days. Following a substantial subsidence of 35 cm (14 in), a new phase of activity led to a land rise of 20 cm (7.9 in) over an equivalent 16-day period. This phase reached a peak height of about 35 cm (14 in) before the first eruption on 18 December 2023, matching the height recorded before the subsidence. Typically, the land undergoes a sharp descent before each intrusion and eruption, followed by a gradual ascent thereafter. The subsidence in the area was caused by an underground movement of magma from Svartsengi, passing beneath Grindavík, and extending towards Sundhnúksgígar to the north-east.

=== March 2024 earthquakes ===
An earthquake swarm on 2 March 2024 was interpreted as a magma intrusion that did not reach the surface. Modeling calculations indicated that the magma intrusion was approximately 3 km (1.9 mi) long, extending from Stóra-Skógfell [ˈstou.ra-ˌskouɣ.fɛtl̥] to Hagafell. The magma within this intrusion lay at a depth of 1.2 km (0.75 mi) at its shallowest point, reaching down to about 3.9 km (2.4 mi). The calculations estimated that approximately 1.3 million m^{3} (46 million cu ft) of magma flowed into Sundhnúksgígar during the magma transfer, significantly less than previous events where it was estimated that around 10 million m^{3} (350 million cu ft) had flowed from Svartsengi into the craters. Before the intrusion, about 8 million m^{3} (280 million cu ft) had accumulated in the chamber under Svartsengi. Magma typically seeks the path of least resistance to the surface, and it is challenging to ascertain what prevented this during the event. Potential obstacles in the magma's path, insufficient volume, or pressure to open a fissure vent, or a combination of these factors could have played a role. The magma intrusion behaved differently from previous transfers, warranting further investigation to enhance understanding of the nature of such events in the area and to anticipate future developments.

=== April 2025 earthquakes ===
Post-eruption analysis of the 1 April 2025 event, utilising satellite remote sensing data, identified the development of an extensive magmatic dike associated with the eruption. The dike's northern terminus was observed to extend approximately 4 km (2.5 mi) beyond Keilir [ˈcʰeiːlɪr̥], while geophysical data indicated shallow subsurface magma storage at a minimum depth of 1.5 km (0.93 mi) beneath the surface. A new graben (subsidence valley) formed north-east of Litla-Skógfell [ˈlɪtl̥a-ˌskouɣ.fɛtl̥] due to faulting above the dike. Svartsengi experienced over 25 cm (9.8 in) of subsidence as magma drained into the dike, while GPS stations in Grindavík recorded up to 50 cm (20 in) of fault displacement, though less severe than the graben formed during the January 2024 eruption. By 4 April, seismicity along the dike had fallen from roughly 100 small earthquakes per hour at its peak to about 20–30 per hour, although low‑level microseismic activity persisted. During the early phase of the event, seismicity clustered at the north-eastern terminus of the intrusion, indicating the potential for magma to breach the surface there. However, as pressure declined over time, the likelihood of surface breakthrough diminished. A swarm of six earthquakes, each exceeding a magnitude of 3.0, occurred near Trölladyngja [ˈtrœtl̥a.tiːŋcja] and has been attributed to stress adjustments associated with the intrusion formation. In the April event, the largest earthquake reached a magnitude of 5.3 on the south-westernmost part of the Reykjanes Peninsula (part of stress adjustments), while the most significant quake in populated areas registered a magnitude of 3.9.

A few days after the event, GPS data showed renewed uplift beneath Svartsengi, indicating that magma recharge had resumed as it did following earlier eruptions in the series, but at a faster rate than before. Initially, scientists interpreted the evolving GPS displacement chart, along with other indicators, to suggest that magma inflow had stalled. However, the ongoing land uplift has challenged this view and underscored the uncertainty of long-term accumulation trends. Owing to its size, the seismic event has been compared with the magma intrusion of November 2023. Although it extended about 5 km (3.1 mi) longer—reaching a total length of 20 km (12 mi)—it was less than half as voluminous, with approximately 30 million m^{3} (1.1 billion cu ft) of magma released from the Svartsengi chamber. The vast majority of the magma did not reach the surface. Measured by line of sight, the intrusion's north-eastern terminus lay roughly 4 km (2.5 mi) south of Route 41 (Reykjanesbraut) and about 12 km (7.5 mi) west of the Capital Region boundary. Following the cessation of both the eruption and intrusion, the six pre-existing hazard zones in and around the Sundhnúkur area were gradually downgraded—from an initial highest classification of "very high hazard" to "considerable hazard".

=== Further earthquakes into 2026 ===
Subsequent earthquake activity was associated with a further eruption on 16 July 2025, and then magma reaccumulation, manifested by uplift.

== Eruptions ==
=== December 2023 eruption ===
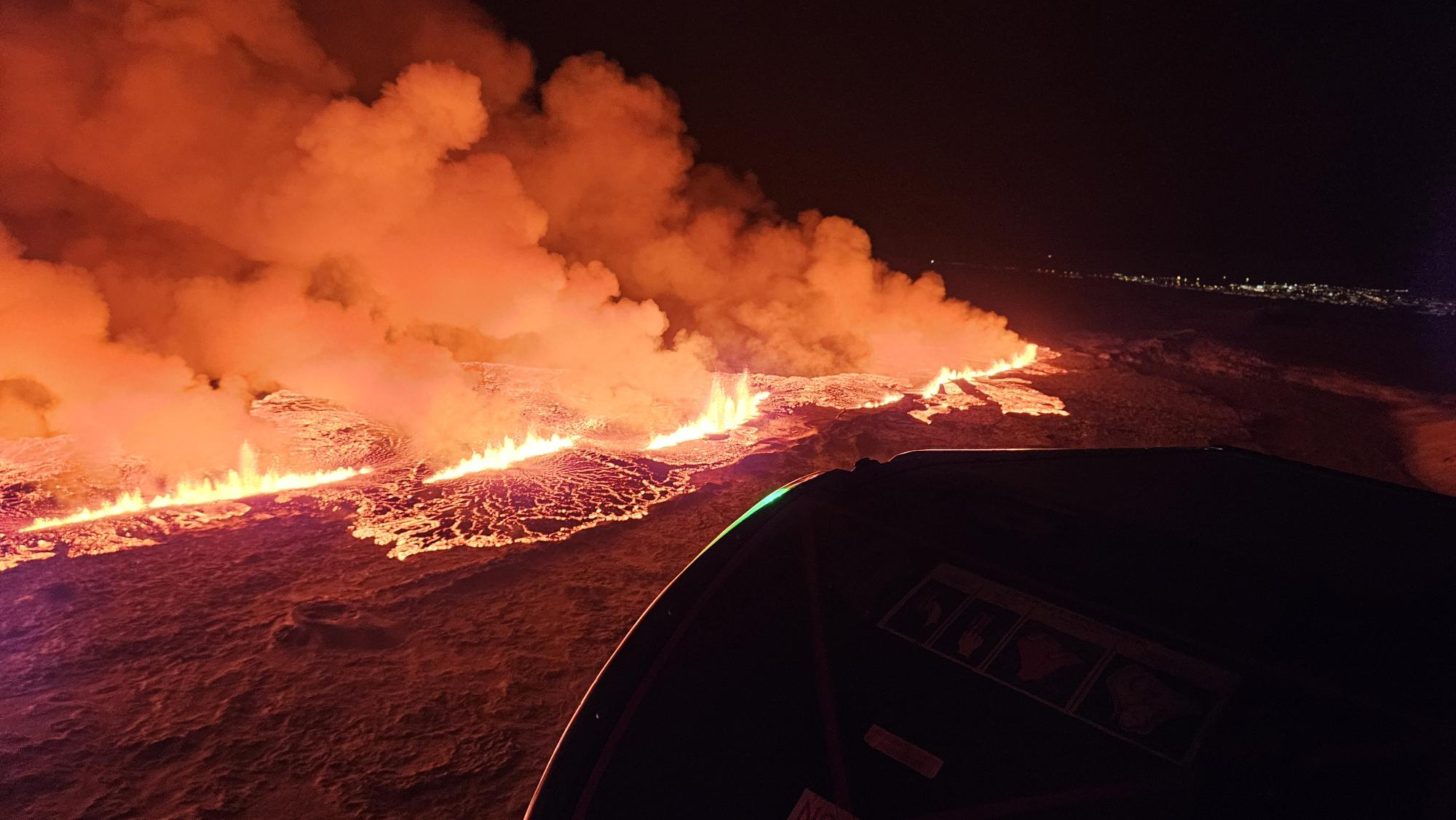
The 18 December 2023 eruption as photographed from a helicopter of the Icelandic Coast Guard. At the right in the background, Grindavík, Iceland, is visible

On 18 December 2023, the first eruption in the series occurred at approximately 22:17 UTC, following a series of small earthquakes, with initial indicators emerging about 90 minutes earlier. The Icelandic Meteorological Office (IMO) pinpointed the origin of the eruption near Hagafell, about 4 km (2.5 mi) north-east of Grindavík, and noted that the eruption stemmed from a fissure with a length of up to 4 km (2.5 mi), with lava flowing at a rate of around 100–300 m^{3}/s (3,500–10,600 cu ft/s) adding that seismic activity appeared to be moving towards the direction of Grindavík. The eruptive fissure followed approximately the line of the Sundhnúksgígar crater row formed from previous eruptions more than 2,000 years ago. An Icelandic Civil Defence official informed the nation's public broadcaster, RÚV, that the eruption occurred rapidly and appeared to be "quite a large event". The eruption was characterised at the time as the largest in the Reykjanes Peninsula since the beginning of eruptive activity in 2021, with lava fountains, up to 100 m (330 ft) high, and was visible as far away as the capital Reykjavík, 42 km (26 mi) away.

Scientists estimated through model calculations that nearly 20 million m^{3} (710 million cu ft) of magma accumulated in the chamber, located several kilometres (a few miles) deep, before the December 2023 eruption. Of this, approximately 12 million m^{3} (420 million cu ft) ascended to the intrusion, initiating the eruption. The lava field covered a total area of approximately 3.4 km^{2} (1.3 sq mi). On a single day during the eruption, the release of sulfur dioxide was approximately 30,000–60,000 t (30,000–59,000 long tons; 33,000–66,000 short tons), depending on the timeline. This sulfur dioxide subsequently reacted with water vapour in the atmosphere to form even more toxic sulfuric acid (H_{2}SO_{4}). The emission was proportionally about ten times greater than the gas output observed in previous eruptions at Fagradalsfjall.

Following the eruption's onset, the Icelandic Coast Guard deployed a helicopter to the area to monitor activity. Numerous delays were reported at Keflavík International Airport, which remained open. The Blue Lagoon spa, which had reopened the day before, did not take bookings on the night of the eruption. Police raised the risk level while the Civil Defence authorities warned the public not to approach the area while emergency personnel assessed the situation. By 19 December, the scent of smoke and ash was detected as far as 30 km (19 mi) from the eruption site, raising fears that volcanic gases could reach Reykjavík by the next day. However, the gas would never extend to dangerous levels there; it could only cause mild discomfort at most. On the same day, the Icelandic Coast Guard rescued a man who had gotten lost near the eruption site using a helicopter. Authorities advised citizens who were in the town during the eruption to evacuate via Route 427 (Suðurstrandarvegur), as the eruption was most likely to threaten Route 43 (Grindavíkurvegur). Officials said residents of Grindavík would be allowed back into the town. The December 2023 eruption, the August–September 2024 eruption, and the July–August 2025 eruption were the only events in the series that caused no damage to infrastructure. On 21 December, the IMO officially declared the eruption concluded after a significant decrease in activity.

=== January 2024 eruption ===
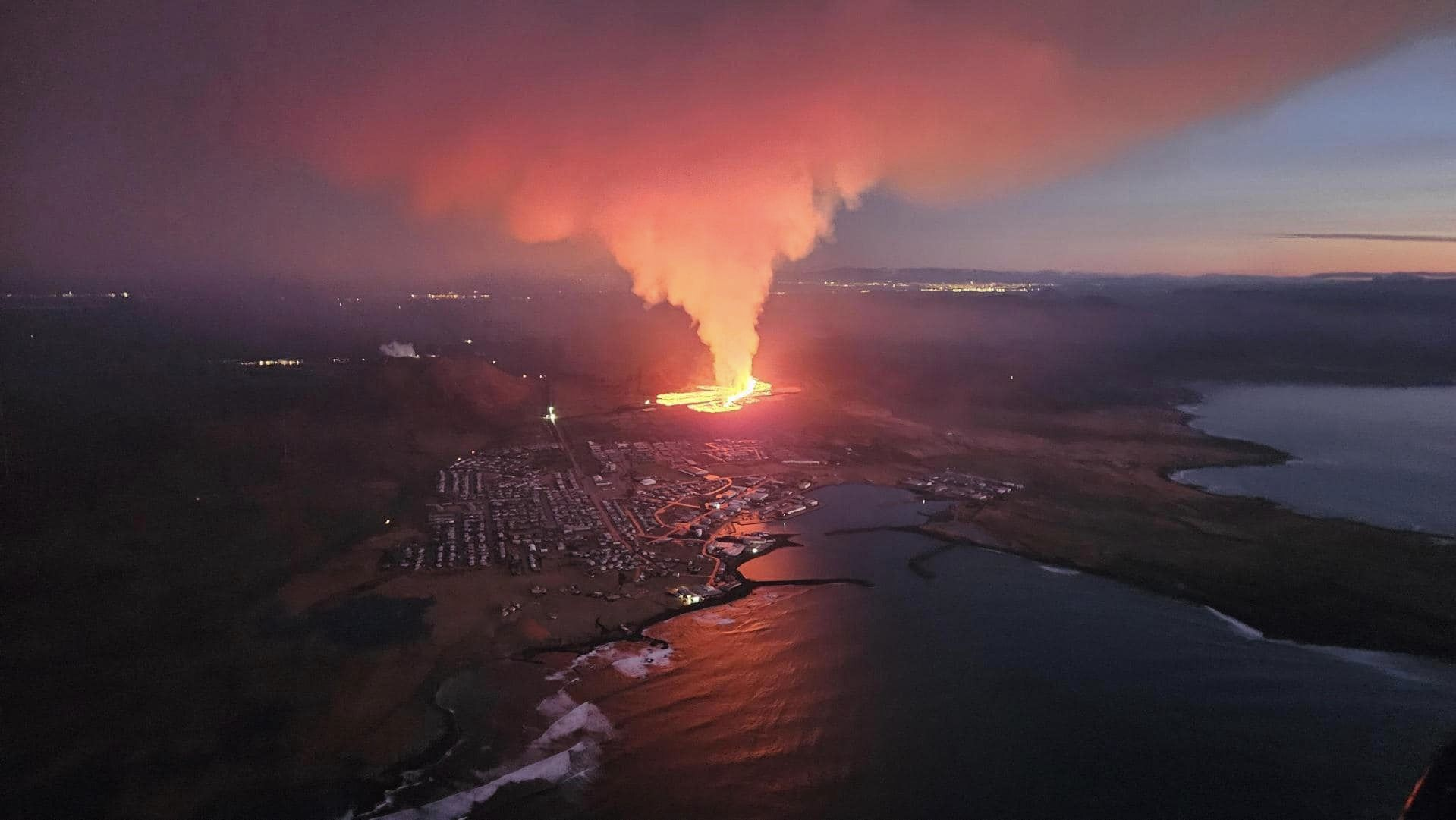
Aerial photograph of the eruption on 14 January 2024

On 14 January 2024, at approximately 07:57 UTC, a second volcanic eruption began about 400–500 m (1,300–1,600 ft) north of Grindavík, following seismic activity originating from the Sundhnúksgígar crater about 5 hours earlier. Although the eruption was described as "not very big", fissures appeared on both sides of the anti-lava defences, and it was estimated that lava could reach the town within 24 hours. A successful mission was launched to save several pieces of heavy machinery worth about ISK 800 million (US$6,500,000), which were used to construct the barriers. The lava flow cut off one of the main roads leading into Grindavík, and the initial fissure extended up to 900 m (3,000 ft). Prior to the eruption, more than 11 million m^{3} (390 million cu ft) of magma had accumulated beneath the Svartsengi area, with only a small portion of that having been emitted above ground. This buildup likely contributed to the formation of a new graben valley in the area.

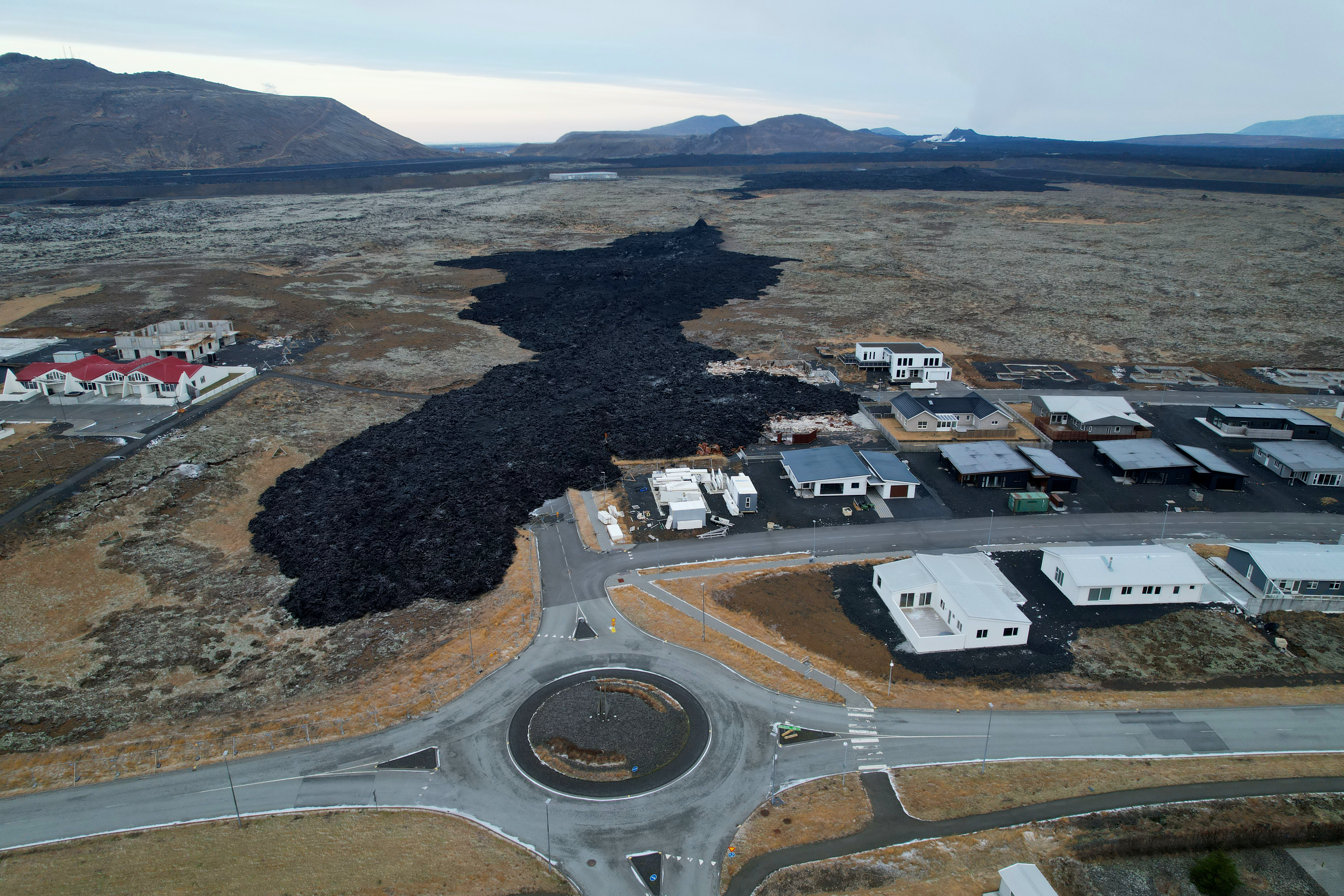
Three houses in Grindavík were destroyed by a lava flow.

Before the eruption began, scientists observed that magma intrusion seemed to have reached beneath the town of Grindavík. A few hours after the first fissure vent opened in the morning, a second vent approximately 100 m (330 ft) emerged around noon, just several tens of metres (a few hundred feet) from the town's outermost houses before ceasing activity a few hours later. Although lava entered the town's boundaries, no eruptive fissure formed within the town itself, where no such fissure is known to have formed since the end of the last ice age. Evacuation orders were reissued in Grindavík, and the Icelandic Coast Guard deployed a helicopter to monitor the situation. Dr. Evgenia Ilyinskaya, a volcanologist from the University of Leeds, suggested that this eruption indicated the Reykjanes Peninsula might be entering a long-term period of frequent eruptions, potentially lasting for centuries. She referred to this period as the New Reykjanes Fires, drawing a parallel to a similar event in the 13th century, which marked the previous active volcanic period on the Reykjanes Peninsula.

By 15 January, volcanic activity had "decreased considerably", and the eruption was declared over on 16 January 2024, just after midnight. In the aftermath of the eruption, scientists discovered a new graben valley, located further east than the one formed during the November 2023 intrusion. The new valley measured up to 1 km (0.62 mi) wide and 30 cm (12 in) deep, in contrast to the older valley, which reached up to 2 km (1.2 mi) in width and 1.3 m (4 ft 3 in) in depth. Subsequently, a deep crack also opened within the town of Grindavík. This eruption was one of the smallest when it finished, affecting only about 0.7 km^{2} (0.27 sq mi) and producing roughly 2 million m^{3} (71 million cu ft) of lava. The maximum lava discharge was 100–200 m^{3}/s (3,500–7,100 cu ft/s). It was the only eruption that actually reached the town's borders.

=== February 2024 eruption ===
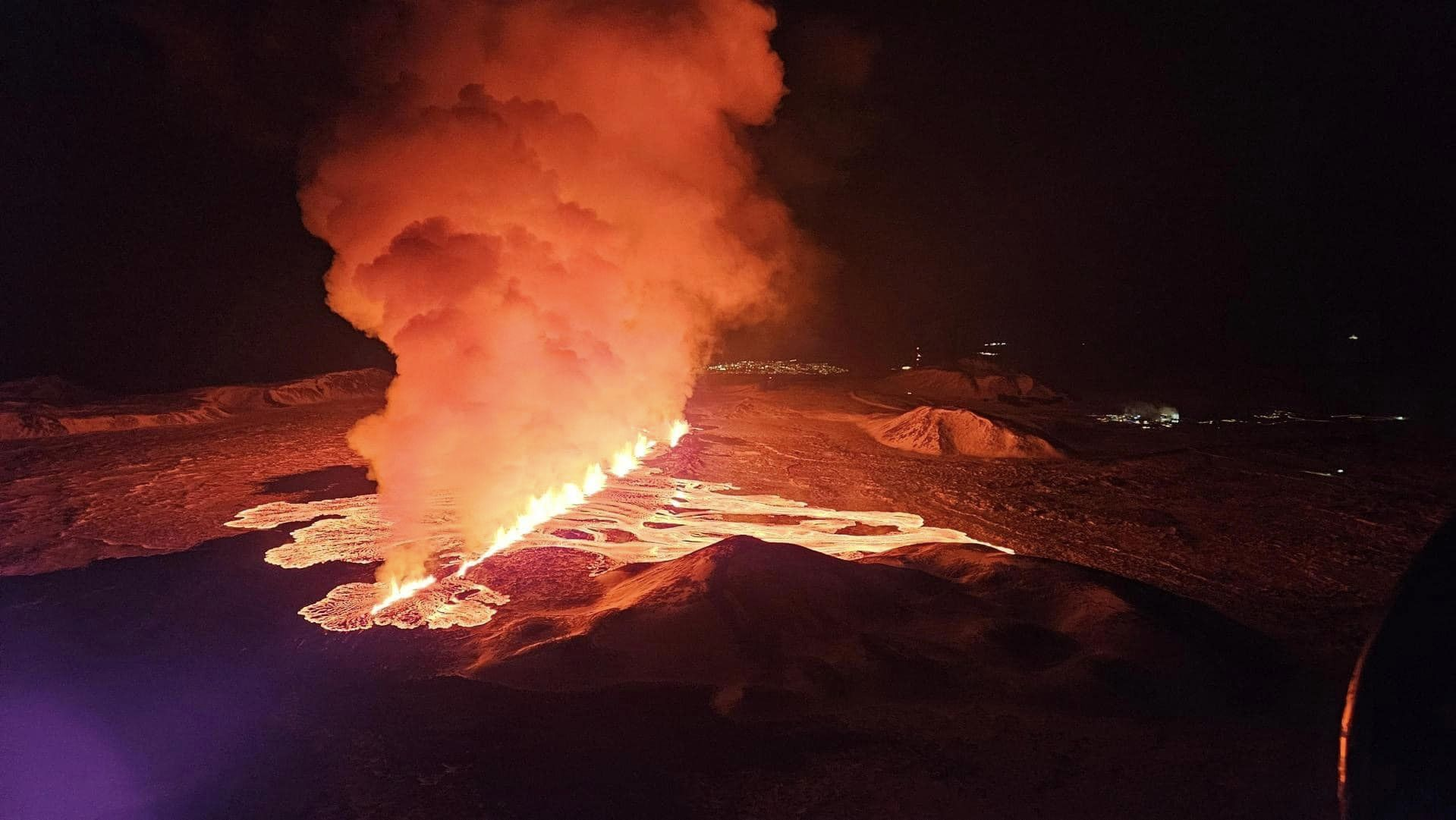
A photograph of the eruption on 8 February 2024

On 8 February 2024 at 06:03 UTC, the third eruption started north of Sýlingarfell following intensive seismic activity that began roughly 30 minutes prior. The eruption produced lava fountains measuring between 50 and 80 m (160 and 260 ft) in height and a volcanic plume up to 3 km (1.9 mi) high. A 3 km (1.9 mi) long fissure opened in the same area as the December 2023 eruption, between the Sundhnúksgígar craters and the hill of Stóra-Skógfell, about 4 km (2.5 mi) north-east of Grindavík. About two-thirds of the lava flowed west into the Svartsengi area, extending up to 4.5 km (2.8 mi) from the eruption centre. The lava represented a flow of about 600 m^{3}/s (21,000 cu ft/s) for the first seven hours. Unlike previous eruptions on the peninsula, the 8 February eruption produced quantities of black ash mixed with steam, theorised to result from groundwater boiling and mixing with magma to create ash.

Less than three hours after the eruption began, infrastructure was said to be "in no danger at the moment". However, an hour later, it was estimated that there was a risk of the lava front flowing over the main hot-water pipeline running from the Svartsengi power station. Five hours after the eruption commenced, authorities declared the situation "very serious", and by the sixth hour, the lava had already flowed over the pipeline, causing serious damage to infrastructure near the Svartsengi power station, although Grindavík remained at a safe distance. Early on 8 February, seismic tremors forced the evacuation of every building around the Blue Lagoon, just hours before the eruption. Later that day, Keflavík Airport lost its hot-water system, and an unrelated leak soon cut the cold-water line. Cold running water was restored on 9 February and hot water on 12 February. Although flights continued as scheduled, many toilet facilities remained closed owing to a shortage of cold running water; fan heaters and blankets kept passengers warm as indoor temperatures fell. The airport's electrical power supply was unaffected.

Volcanic activity subsided later on eruption day and came to a complete stop in the afternoon of 9 February. On 10 February, the Icelandic Meteorological Office (IMO) formally declared the eruption over. As of today, this eruption has caused the most damage to infrastructure in the series, despite lasting only about one and a half days. The rapid and insidious lava flow caught response teams in the area off guard, as a series of unfortunate events allowed the molten rock to overrun the infrastructures unrestrained. Although about 9 million m^{3} (320 million cu ft) of magma had gathered below Svartsengi just before the event, the IMO estimated that 13 million m^{3} (460 million cu ft) of lava erupted on 8 February alone. The lava covered about 4 km^{2} (1.5 sq mi) after the conclusion of the eruption.

=== March–May 2024 eruption ===
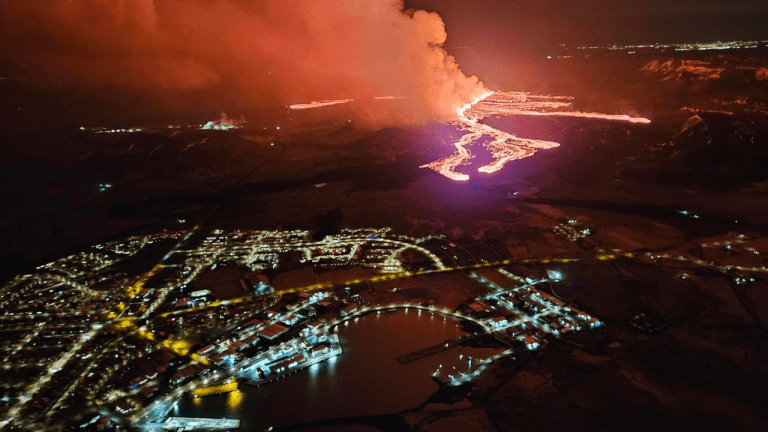
Aerial photograph of the eruption near Grindavík on 16 March 2024

On 16 March 2024, the fourth eruption began at 20:23 UTC, with weak initial signs occurring less than an hour earlier between Hagafell and Stóra-Skógfell. Impressive lava fountains formed in the initial hours, reaching heights of several dozen metres (a few hundred feet) in height. Both the Blue Lagoon and Grindavík were evacuated. A 3 km (1.9 mi) fissure opened up, producing two lava flows going in different directions. The first was seen to be moving in a westward direction towards the Blue Lagoon and the Svartsengi power plant and reached Route 43 (Grindavíkurvegur) leading into Grindavík, raising concerns that it could damage fibre-optic cables laid on the road and cause internet and telecommunications disruptions. The second lava flow was seen to be moving south, reaching the eastern protective barriers of Grindavík at a speed of 1 km/h (0.6 mph). The Icelandic Meteorological Office (IMO) said the eruption was "significantly wider" than the eruption of the previous month, while a geophysicist who observed the eruption during a helicopter flight described the eruption as the "most powerful" so far of the current eruption sequence. A state of emergency was once more declared in the region on the day of the eruption, as had been done during earlier eruptions in the series, but it was downgraded later in steps. Volcanic activity substantially diminished in the days and weeks following the onset of the eruption but continued nonetheless.

During the initial phase of the eruption, the lava flow rate surged to between 1,100 and 1,200 m^{3}/s (39,000 and 42,000 cu ft/s) within the first hour. However, this intensity rapidly waned, with the ejection rate diminishing to approximately 100 m^{3}/s (3,500 cu ft/s) within six to eight hours of onset. By 17 March 2024, one day after the eruption began, the newly formed lava field covered nearly 6 km^{2} (2.3 sq mi). By 20 March, the average lava output had decreased to around 15 m^{3}/s (530 cu ft/s). Between 20 and 27 March, the average lava flow rate reduced to approximately 7.8 ± 0.7 m^{3}/s (275 ± 25 ft^{3}/s). From 27 March–3 April, the average flow rate was estimated at 6.6 ± 0.3 m^{3}/s (233 ± 11 ft^{3}/s), further decreasing to 3.6 ± 0.7 m^{3}/s (127 ± 25 ft^{3}/s) between 3–8 April. The lava bed had expanded to cover an area of 6.14 km^{2} (2.37 sq mi) by 9 April, with a volume of 31.3 million m^{3} (1.11 billion cu ft), and only one active crater remained. Throughout this period, there was a consistent upward movement of land due to magma flow. By the first half of April, the average ejection rate further decreased to approximately 3–4 m^{3}/s (110–140 cu ft/s). In the final two weeks leading up to the conclusion of the eruption, the lava ejection rate had diminished to 1 or less m^{3}/s (35 or less ft^{3}/s).

There was an indication that magma was primarily emerging from a deeper chamber and bypassing the intermediate storage at 4–5 km (2.5–3.1 mi) beneath Svartsengi, previously the exclusive reservoir for the last three eruptions. Such direct access from the deeper source, located at 8–12 km (5.0–7.5 mi) depth, may have explained the prolonged activity of the eruption. A recent study revealed that this eruption, along with all prior events in the series, has demonstrated "substantial mantle-derived geochemical variability" attributable to dynamic magma behaviour in the mid-crust, thereby complicating efforts to predict future volcanic activity with accuracy.

In early April 2024, Professor Þorvaldur Þórðarson, observing the decline in thermal imaging signals and magma output, suggested the eruption was weakening. The darkening of gases and the halt in land uplift underscored a shift in the magma dynamics, now dominated by the deeper magma source. This pattern echoed the initial stages of the 2021 Fagradalsfjall eruption, marked by low magma activity. He also posited that a reduction in magma flow to below 2–3 m^{3}/s (71–106 cu ft/s) would have heralded the cessation of the eruption in the foreseeable future. Land uplift had halted when the March–May 2024 eruption began but resumed at the beginning of April at a slower pace than after the previous three eruptions. As a result, approximately half of the magma flow was diverted to the shallower magma chamber, while the other half continued to the surface. The volume of magma that had accumulated prior to the event was more than 4 million m^{3} (140 million cu ft), which is considerably lower than the volumes observed before other eruptions in the series. This lower magma volume is attributed to the magma intrusion in early March 2024 that failed to breach the surface approximately two weeks prior to the March–May 2024 eruption.

The eruption commenced with the shortest warning on record—characterised by minimal precursor seismicity and the briefest interval from initial indications to onset—a phenomenon attributed to repeated dike injections along preferential pathways established by earlier intrusions, which progressively reduce resistance to magma ascent and facilitate subsequent eruptions. Moreover, it was initially noted to be more intense than its predecessors in the series, establishing it as the most energetic volcanic activity observed since the 2014–2015 Bárðarbunga eruption, until it was later surpassed by the May–June 2024 eruption. As of today, this eruption remains the longest-lasting in the series, persisting for 54 days. Access to the eruption area was prohibited, as it was with previous eruptions. However, some tourists have still been caught and turned back, though this has not been a significant issue.

After almost 24 hours without any lava activity from the crater, the eruption was officially declared over on 9 May. By the time it ceased, the lava field had expanded slightly to approximately 6.2 km^{2} (2.4 sq mi), up from its initial coverage of just under 6 km^{2} (2.3 sq mi) after the first day of the eruption. The total volume of lava produced is estimated at 35 million m^{3} (1.2 billion cu ft). According to the Institute of Earth Sciences at the University of Iceland, although this eruption was significantly smaller than the 2021 event, its volume was three times greater than that of the December 2023 and February 2024 eruptions.

=== May–June 2024 eruption ===
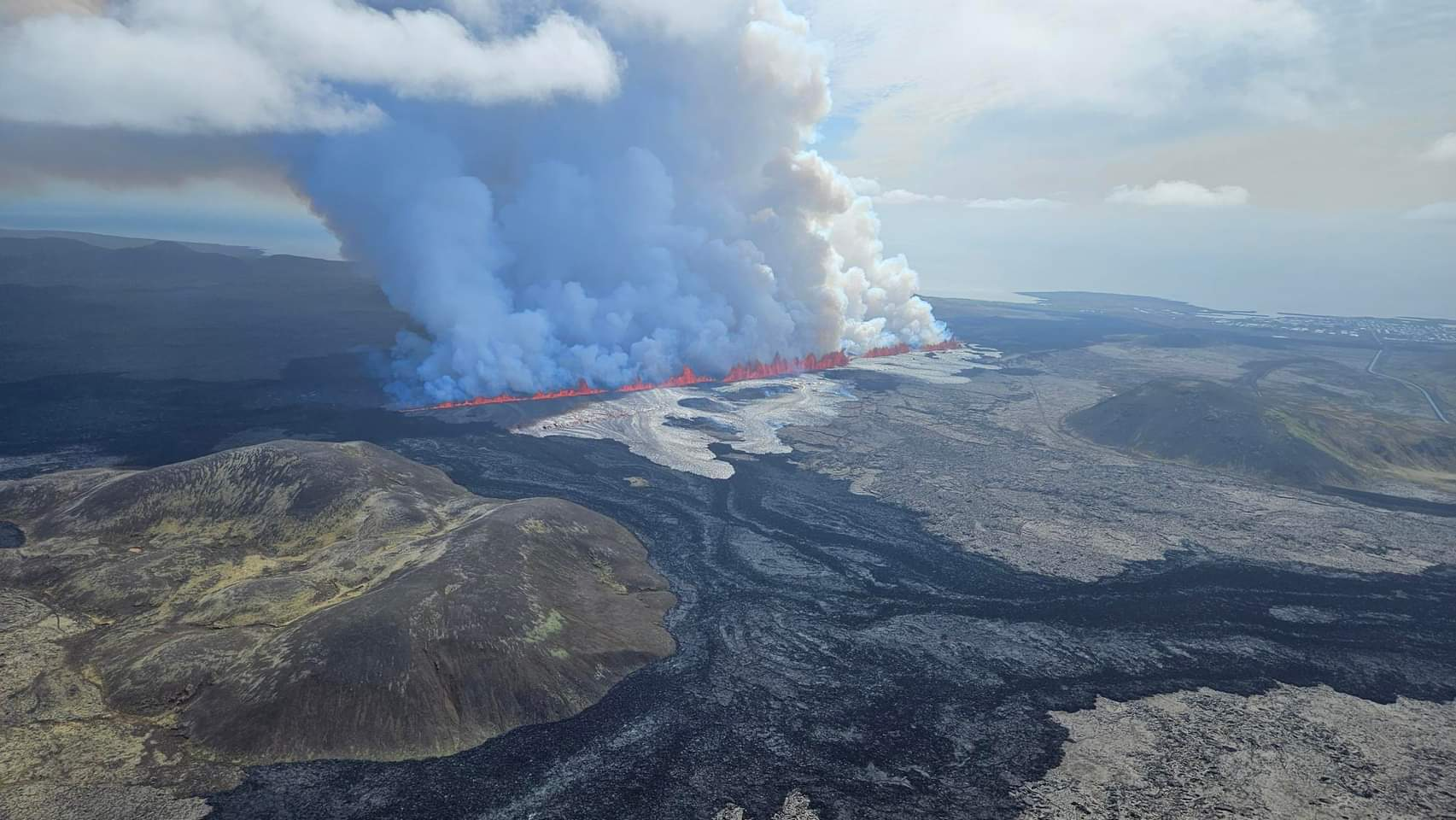
Eruption on 29 May 2024 just after it started

On 29 May 2024 at 12:45 UTC, a fifth eruption commenced following the opening of a fissure near Sundhnúksgígar, after a swarm of earthquakes began in the area nearly 2 hours earlier. This eruption produced lava fountains reaching heights of 60–70 m (200–230 ft) and plumes ascending to an altitude of 3.5 km (2.2 mi). Volcanic smog, consisting of sulfate ions, was also detected far from Iceland with satellite imagery. The fissure was initially estimated to be over 1 km (0.62 mi) in length, but roughly an hour and a half later, the fissure had expanded to a width of 3.4 km (2.1 mi), consistent with the pattern observed in previous eruptions. Evacuations were again ordered in Grindavík and at the Blue Lagoon. This eruption followed a week with around 400 recorded earthquakes in the area while more than 17 million m^{3} (600 million cu ft) of magma had accumulated underground. The lava flow in the first four hours of the eruption was estimated to average around 1,500 m^{3}/s (53,000 cu ft/s), surpassing the previous record holder of the series, the March–May 2024 eruption.

A team from the Icelandic Institute of Natural History and the National Land Survey of Iceland analysed data collected by experts from Verkís, Efla, and Svarmi during a drone flight over the eruption sites on 3 June 2024. The data revealed that the lava field covered an area of 8.6 km^{2} (3.3 sq mi) and had a volume of approximately 36 million m^{3} (1.3 billion cu ft), indicating an average flow rate during that period of close to 30 m^{3}/s (1,100 cu ft/s). By 10 June, the lava field had expanded to around 9.2 km^{2} (3.6 sq mi) with a total volume of 41 million m^{3} (1.4 billion cu ft), and the average flow rate had decreased to approximately 10 m^{3}/s (350 cu ft/s). Lava lakes formed as a result of lava pooling with little or no flow velocity, particularly against Sýlingarfell. In the initial days following the start of the eruption, the number of active craters reduced to three, and about a week later, only one crater remained active until the eruption concluded.

Initial geochemical data indicates that new and altered magma had accumulated beneath Svartsengi since early April 2024 when the land uplift began, leading up to the May–June 2024 eruption. The magma, distinct from the one feeding the March–May eruption, likely gathered in a separate chamber within the middle crust and exhibited a low K_{2}O/TiO_{2} ratio during the May–June eruption, a first since the 2021 Fagradalsfjall eruption. Scientists believe the two magma systems under Svartsengi are interconnected deep within the Earth's crust. Two days after the May–June eruption began, sulfur dioxide levels in Edinburgh, Scotland spiked to 2,322 times higher than usual, the highest in about 50 years, due to strong North Atlantic winds. Despite the elevated gas levels, local authorities confirmed that there was no threat to the inhabitants of Edinburgh, situated approximately 1,368 km (850 mi) from the volcano. Such phenomena were observed during significant fissure eruptions in Iceland, like the 2014–2015 Bárðarbunga eruption in Holuhraun, which released nearly 12 million m^{3} (420 million cu ft) of sulfur dioxide over its six months of activity, surpassing Europe's total annual SO_{2} emissions and affecting multiple countries across the continent.

The eruption spread rapidly during the first few hours, extending from Stóra-Skógfell in the north-west to Fiskidalsfjall [ˈfɪs.kɪ.tals.fjatl̥] mountain in the south-east, and reaching as far as Illahraun [ˈɪtl̥a r̥auːn], west of Grindavík. At its most intense, the eruption released a large amount of ash at the southern end of the fissure due to contact with accumulated groundwater from recent rain, resulting in numerous explosions and even more violent interactions than in the February 2024 eruption. Lava flowing towards Grindavík was deflected by protective barriers, but two of the three main roads leading to the town were cut off. Volcanic activity decreased on 30 May and stopped on 22 June. Lasting for 24 days, the eruption produced a volume of about 45 million m^{3} (1.6 billion cu ft) and covered an area of 9.3 km^{2} (3.6 sq mi), making it the largest eruption in this series in all aspects at that time. This record was later beaten by the August–September 2024 eruption.

=== August–September 2024 eruption ===
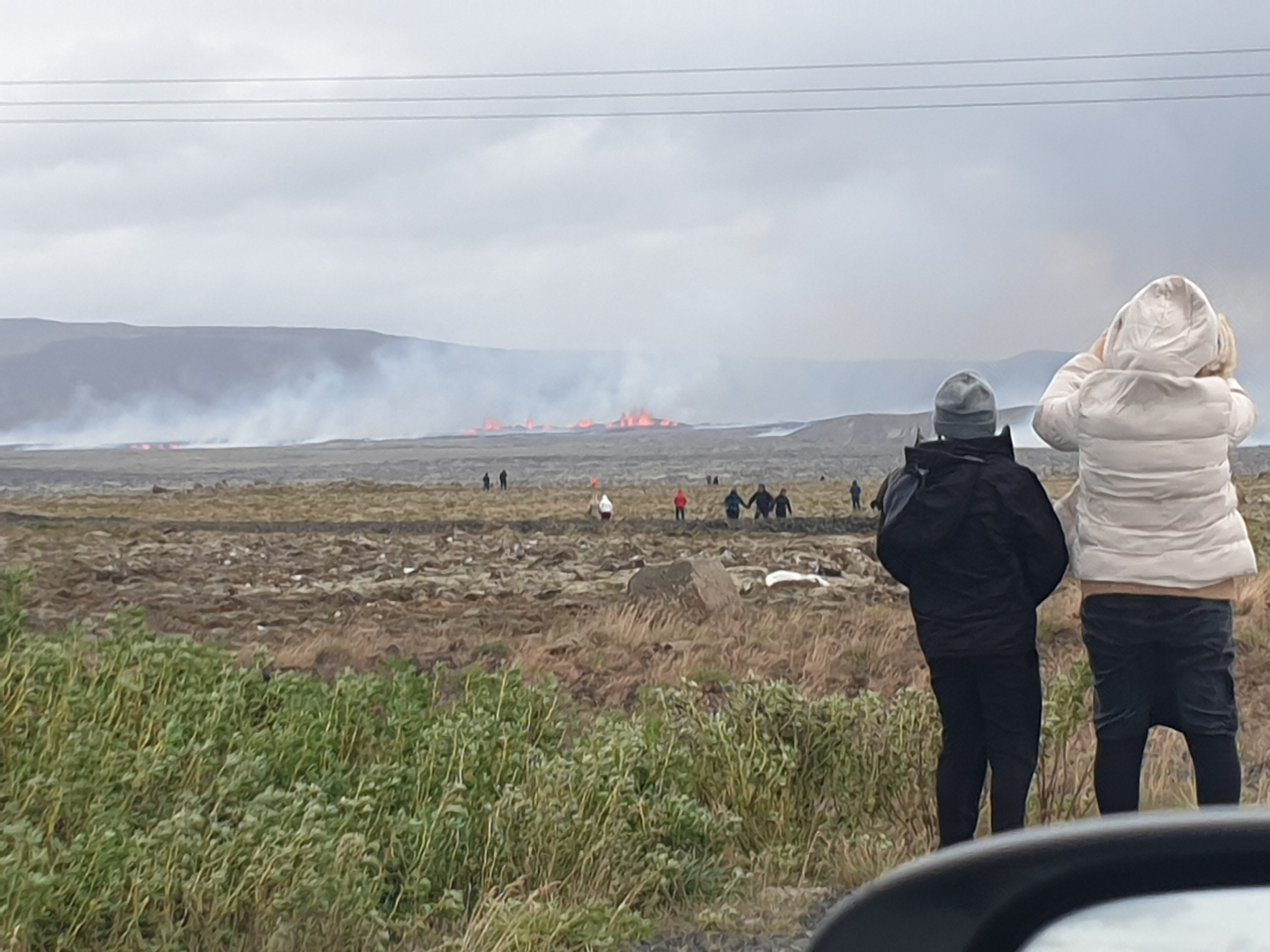
Tourists near Route 43 (Grindavíkurvegur) observing the eruption the day after it started

On 22 August 2024, the sixth eruption in the ongoing volcanic series commenced at approximately 21:25 UTC, following a significant sequence of earthquakes that began more than 30 minutes earlier. The most substantial tremor in this series registered a magnitude of 4.1, the biggest in the area since December 2023. About 30 minutes after the eruption began, the newly formed fissure was estimated to be around 1.4 km (0.87 mi) in length. The fissure rapidly extended, reaching nearly 4 km (2.5 mi) within another 40 minutes. Lava flows from the fissure advanced approximately 1 km (0.62 mi) every 10 minutes within the first half an hour, with the average lava flow rate during the initial hours of the eruption estimated up to 2,000 m^{3}/s (71,000 cu ft/s), marking the highest rate recorded in the series thus far. Approximately five hours after the eruption began, a new 1 km (0.62 mi) fissure opened north of the already active fissure line. At its peak, scientists estimate that the total extent of the eruptive fissures reached about 7 km (4.3 mi), although not all sections were active simultaneously. Before the eruption began, around 21 million m^{3} (740 million cu ft) of magma had accumulated in the magma chamber beneath Svartsengi.

The Blue Lagoon was safely evacuated, with approximately 1,300 guests and staff relocated without incident. The nearby town of Grindavík remained largely unaffected, though residents of over 20 homes were also evacuated as a precaution. Keflavík Airport continued normal operations, but Route 41 (Reykjanesbraut) was temporarily closed to allow emergency response teams better access. The road was later reopened, but with a temporary speed limit of 50 km/h (31 mph) between the interchanges at Route 43 (Grindavíkurvegur) and Route 421 (Vogavegur) due to drivers stopping on the wayside of the highway to view the eruption, creating a danger. Authorities were stationed near the eruption site to restrict access, as the area was considered a hazard zone. Still, many tourists gathered along Route 43 to watch the volcano, and some even walked toward the eruption.

The Icelandic Coast Guard flew its helicopter to visualise the eruption, along with scientists. Favourable wind conditions during the initial days of the eruption directed volcanic gases southward, toward the ocean. As a result, gases from the volcano were carried with winds to countries like Scotland and Spain. The eruption remained visible from the Capital Region for several days and was even observable from more distant towns. A few days after the eruption began, the lava started to approach an old bomb practice area in Vogaheiði [ˈvɔɣa ˌheiðɪ]. This area was used by the United States Army between 1952 and 1960 for practicing with explosives, including mortar bombs, cannonballs, and small rockets, which can be deadly within a radius of 300 m (980 ft) if they explode. Concerns arose because the area is highly polluted, and many unignited explosives remain scattered over an extremely large site. The lava from the eruption was monitored closely to mitigate any potential risks related to these explosives. The eruption caused no damage to infrastructure.

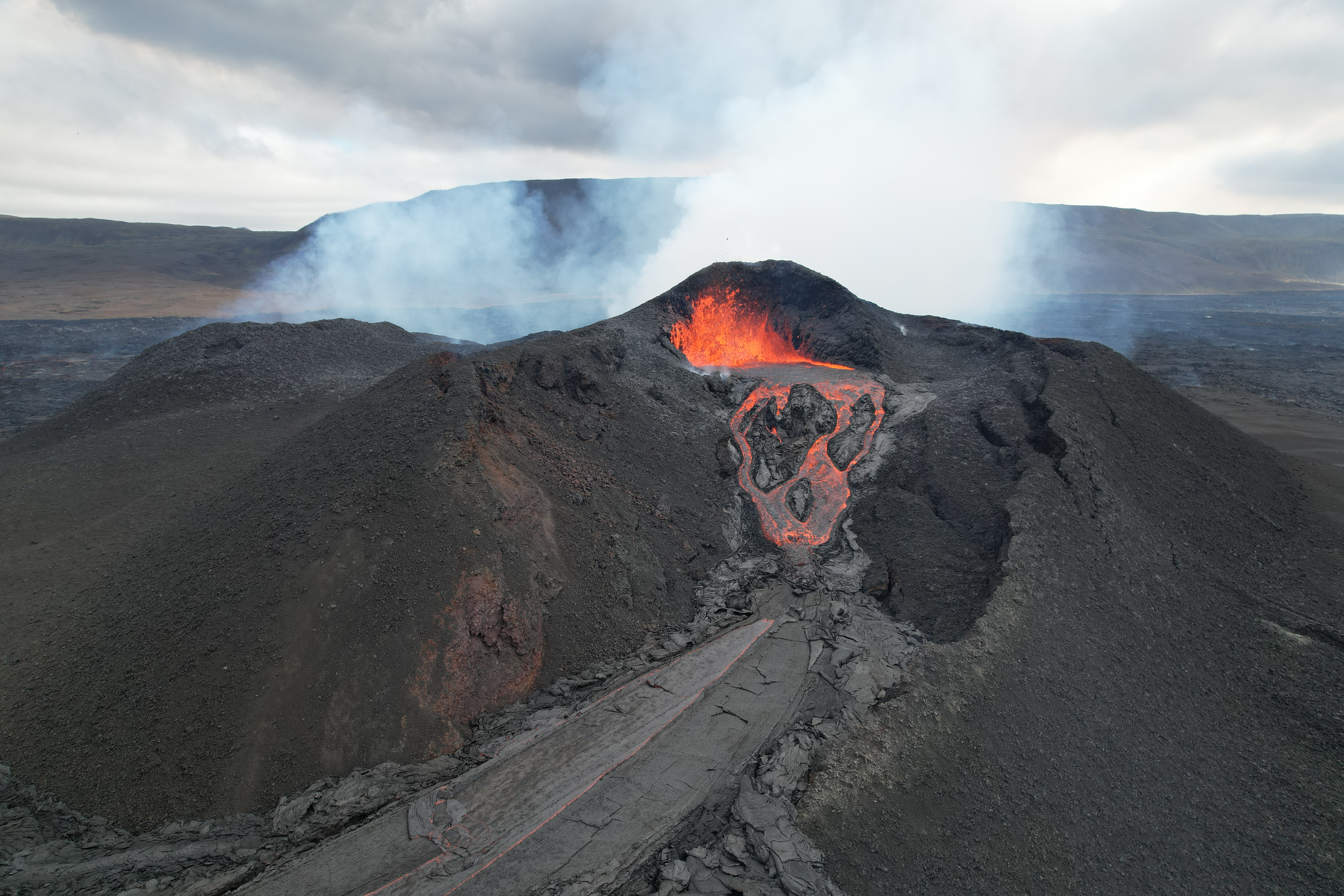
The volcano at one of the last days of the eruption

The lava initially flowed mostly to the south and west but, in its last days, flowed almost exclusively to the north toward Route 41 (Reykjanesbraut), with only about 2.7 km (1.7 mi) left and even less distance remaining to the Suðurnesjalína power line, which connects the towns on the Reykjanes Peninsula to the Capital Region. The eruption was the first in the series to cross into a new municipality, reaching Vogar [ˈvɔɣar̥] in the north. The eruption also caused up to 40 cm (16 in) of subsidence due to 17–27 million m^{3} (600–950 million cu ft) of magma flowing from the reservoir under Svartsengi to the Sundhnúksgígar crater chain. In total, the erupted lava volume above the surface reached 61 million m^{3} (2.2 billion cu ft), making it approximately 15 million m^{3} (530 million cu ft) larger than the May–June 2024 eruption. A few days after the eruption began, the lava flow rate had dropped below 100 m^{3}/s (3,500 cu ft/s), and the affected area had already reached 15.8 km^{2} (6.1 sq mi). By 3 September 2024, only two erupting craters remained active. On 6 September, the Icelandic Meteorological Office (IMO) officially declared the eruption over. Lasting approximately 14 days, it was the third longest in the recent series of volcanic events. According to scientists, "it is evident from model calculations that no comparable volume of magma has reached the surface since the onset of seismic activity in the autumn of 2023".

=== November–December 2024 eruption ===
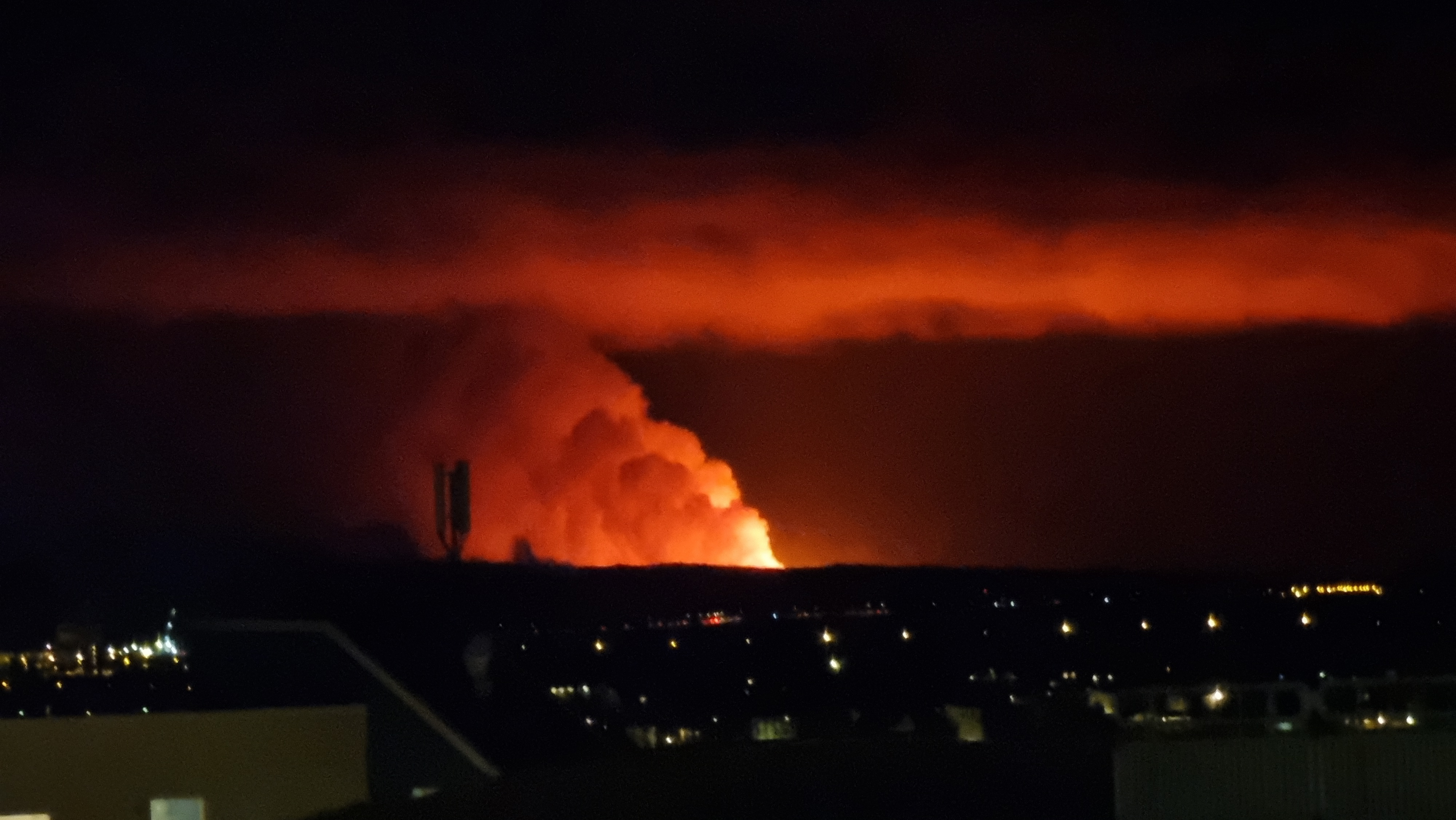
Eruption visible from Reykjavík on 20 November 2024

On 20 November 2024, the seventh eruption in an ongoing volcanic series began at 23:14 UTC, following a series of small earthquakes that started over 40 minutes earlier. A fissure initially measuring 2 km (1.2 mi) long formed, extending north-east to 3 km (1.9 mi) in about 2.5 hours, with lava flowing to both the west and east. The eruption's lava flow rate was about 1,300 m^{3}/s (46,000 cu ft/s) in the first hours, which was considerably lower than in the August–September 2024 eruption. Within the first seven hours, the eruption had spread to nearly 7 km^{2} (2.7 sq mi), and lava quickly approached Route 43 (Grindavíkurvegur), crossing it over five hours after the eruption started. By 11 hours, the lava had reached the Blue Lagoon's parking lot and engulfed it, along with a temporary service building. At that point, the lava was advancing at approximately 100 m (330 ft) per hour. Around 10 million m^{3} (350 million cu ft) of magma had flowed from the magma chamber in the first hours, about half the volume of the previous eruption. After less than 24 hours, only three craters remained active, with the middle one producing the most significant output.

By the eighth day, the lava field had reached an area of 9.1 km^{2} (3.5 sq mi), with a total volume of 47 million m^{3} (1.7 billion cu ft) and only one crater active. The rate of lava effusion, while initially declining after the eruption's onset, had stabilised and remained relatively consistent. On the same day, the lava flow rate was measured at approximately 7–8 m^{3}/s (250–280 cu ft/s), a substantial decline compared to the eruption's first day. The volcanic activity also released an estimated 64–71 kg/s (140–160 lb/s) of sulfur dioxide. During its second week, the lava primarily flowed south-eastward, advancing toward Sandhóll [ˈsant.houːtl̥] and Fagradalsfjall. Additionally, the eruption began to stabilise as a balance was reached between the inflow of magma to the reservoir beneath Svartsengi and the effusion of lava at the surface. The sole active crater continued to grow, raising concerns about the potential for structural collapse. By the third week, eruptive activity gradually diminished, accompanied by a steady decline in volcanic tremor measurements.

The eruption came as a surprise, as the pattern of previous eruptions had led scientists to anticipate the magma intrusion would continue into December 2024. Unlike earlier events, there was no significant increase in seismic activity in the weeks preceding the eruption, suggesting a potential shift in the volcano's behaviour. At the onset of the eruption, authorities described its location as "favourable" because it was initially far from infrastructure. However, the situation changed when the lava flow quickly developed a well-defined channel. This was facilitated by alterations in the landscape caused by previous lava flows, which created conditions conducive to the formation of a robust pathway. As a result, the lava advanced along the northern section of the Svartsengi barrier. The eruption prompted the evacuation of the Blue Lagoon and more than 50 houses in Grindavík. Authorities instructed people not to come to the area, which continued to be closely monitored for safety. Although roughly 21 million m^{3} (740 million cu ft) of magma accumulated in a shallow chamber at a depth of roughly 5 km (3.1 mi) beneath Svartsengi prior to the eruption, about 49 million m^{3} (1.7 billion cu ft) of lava was expelled onto the surface, covering an area of approximately 9 km^{2} (3.5 sq mi). This discrepancy was attributed to magma being sourced from a deeper chamber, with equilibrium gradually forming between magma inflow and outflow. In this system, when magma begins to accumulate again in the shallow chamber, land uplift resumes, typically indicating the preparation for a future eruption. As of today, this eruption is the second largest in the ongoing eruptive series, with a total volume approximately 12 million m^{3} (420 million cu ft) less than the August–September 2024 eruption, which remains the largest in the series.

The lava flow engulfed Blue Lagoon's 350-space parking area and destroyed a small, temporary service building in the zone. However, construction workers managed to close an exposed gap in the defence barrier, which had served as the entrance to the Blue Lagoon area, preventing the lava from advancing further into the site. A water protection area near the geothermal spa was not considered in danger, and power lines experienced only minor disturbances. Two transmission towers in the area were later at risk as lava had surrounded the protective filling at their bases, steadily advancing toward their reinforced concrete foundations and steel frameworks. In response to the threat, fire crews were requested to the site and deployed an apparatus to apply water streams onto the lava flow, aiming to cool its surface, slow its progression, and protect the structural stability of the towers. On the north-western section of the protective barriers around Svartsengi, lava neared overspilling, prompting the installation of 12 high-powered water cannons along a 360 m (1,180 ft) stretch. Connected to excess water discharge from the Svartsengi power station, the cannons provided a continuous supply, effectively cooling the lava and halting its advance. Officials later declared the effort successful. Construction workers also decided to reinforce the barriers in the area by increasing their height. The last activity from the active crater was observed on the morning of 8 December 2024, with no further activity detected later that day, thereby confirming the end of the eruption.

=== April 2025 eruption ===
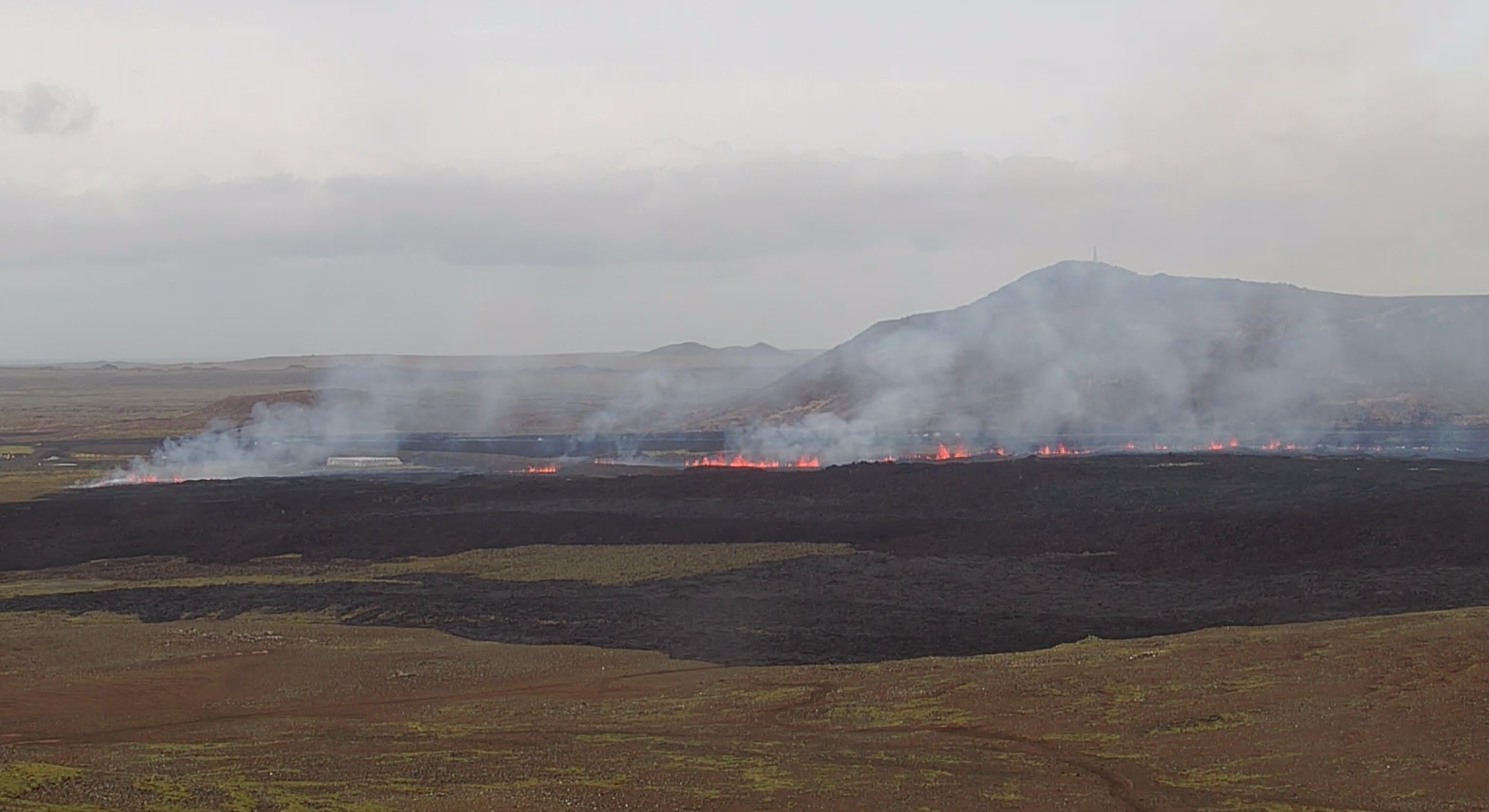
The April 2025 eruption seen from a webcam located on Húsafell mountain, east of Grindavík

On 1 April 2025, the eighth eruption in an ongoing volcanic series began at 09:44 UTC, following a series of earthquakes that lasted for more than 3 hours. The seismic swarm began near the Sundhnúkur crater row, accompanied by rapid deformation detected by GPS stations and pressure changes in boreholes operated by HS Orka. These signals confirmed the onset of a magma intrusion—the largest since November 2023—with approximately 30 million m^{3} (1.1 billion cu ft) of magma flowing from the Svartsengi magma reservoir into the newly formed dike. By roughly 10:00 UTC, the fissure had already penetrated through the defensive walls north of the town and triggered fault movements in the area. Around 12:35 UTC, the primary fissure had expanded to an estimated length of 1.2 km (0.75 mi). Additionally, a second fissure opened between Grindavík and its protective barriers. Seismic activity below the surface extended the dike around 20 km (12 mi) north-east, with earthquakes concentrated at its north-eastern end, 9 km (5.6 mi) beyond previous eruption sites. Triggered earthquakes up to M3.9 near Trölladyngja and M5.3 at the south-west tip of Reykjanes were later linked to stress adjustments from the intrusion, according to the Icelandic Meteorological Office (IMO).

The eruption led to the evacuation of both the town and the Blue Lagoon, triggering warning sirens across the region. after it commenced just to the north of protective barriers constructed close to Grindavík. Eight residents chose to remain in the town, as the evacuation was voluntary. While prevailing winds transported volcanic pollutants toward the north-east during the eruption, the overall quantity emitted was minimal. The IMO reported that a hot-water pipeline broke in northern Grindavík, confirming that significant fault movements had occurred within the town's boundaries. New minor cracks were also detected on the streets within the town. No damage was caused by direct contact with the lava.

Preceding the eruption, the IMO detected an earthquake swarm beginning at approximately 6:30 UTC centered on the Sundhnúkur crater row. Seismic signals indicated stronger activity than earlier recent events, suggesting substantial magma movement beneath the surface. The eruption was described as "only a small leak from the magma intrusion", as only a fraction of the magma reached the surface. By 16:45 UTC on 1 April, eruptive activity had ceased, and the event was formally declared over; however, incandescent lava remained visible in the vicinity for several hours afterward. As of today, this eruption is the briefest and least powerful in the series, covering only 0.23 km^{2} (0.089 sq mi) and 0.4 million m^{3} (14 million cu ft), with an average thickness of 1.7 m (5 ft 7 in). In the following hours, although volcanic activity had stopped, seismic activity continued in the newly formed dike for several days, as detailed in the April 2025 earthquakes section. More than 22 million m^{3} (780 million cu ft) of magma had built up in the shallower magma chamber under the Svartsengi area.

=== July–August 2025 eruption ===
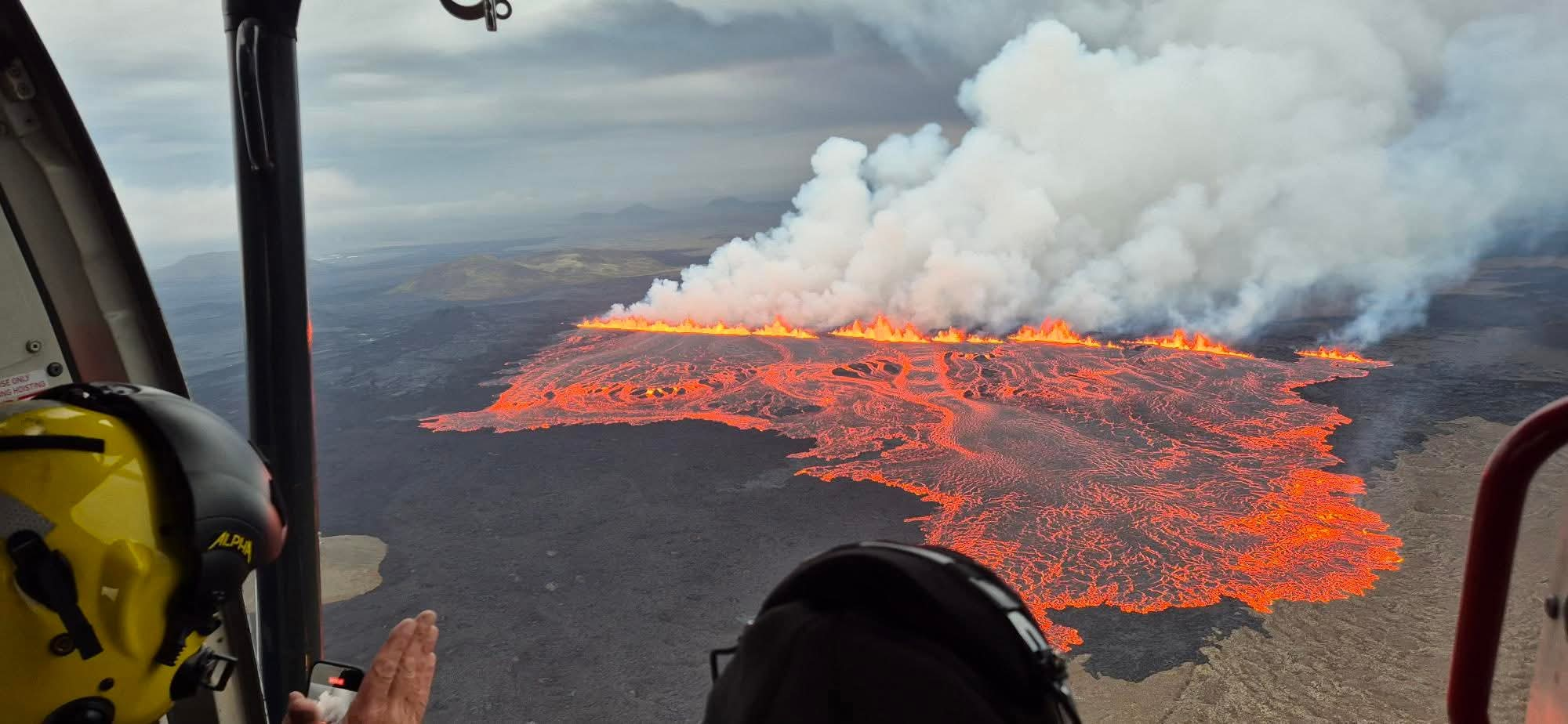
The eruption observed from the Icelandic Coast Guard's helicopter on 16 July 2025

On 16 July 2025 at 03:54 UTC, nearly three hours after a swarm of 4–6 km (2.5–3.7 mi) deep earthquakes exposed a south–north dike beneath the crater row, the ninth eruption broke out just south-east of Litla‑Skógfell. The initial fissure, measuring 700–1,000 m (2,300–3,300 ft), lengthened to roughly 2.4 km (1.5 mi) within eight hours. A parallel 500 m (1,600 ft) crack and advancing pāhoehoe flows expanded the lava field to over 3.2 km^{2} (1.2 sq mi), as confirmed by ICEYE satellite imagery. Within 24 hours, the fissure fragmented into 10–12 active cones. By 19 July it had consolidated into about two or three cones and to a single cone by 22 July. As of 23 July, the lava field had expanded to 3.3 km^{2} (1.3 sq mi) in area and 26.8 million m^{3} (950 million cu ft) in volume. As in the February 2024 and May–June 2024 eruptions, this eruption interacted with groundwater, violently ejecting grey ash and smoke into the air in certain areas. Because earlier models had predicted the next eruption in autumn 2025, this mid‑July event caught volcanologists by surprise. Prior to the event, less than 22 million m^{3} (780 million cu ft) of magma had pooled in the magma chamber beneath the surface.

An evacuation was carried out in the area, affecting approximately 200 people at the Blue Lagoon and over 100 residents and visitors in the town of Grindavík, including around 20 to 30 campers at a local campsite. Two United Airlines aircraft headed for Keflavík Airport returned to their points of departure on the airline's own initiative, without having received any specific advisories or instructions from Icelandic air traffic control. At that time, access to the volcano was permitted, and conditions for visiting the eruption were considered the most favourable since the Fagradalsfjall eruptive series of 2021–2023. The location of the eruption, combined with the availability of parking facilities along the peninsula's south coast, attracted large numbers of tourists and other visitors, resulting in full parking lots in the area. Some people were even seen walking on the recently cooled lava, most of them foreign tourists. This behaviour was also frequently observed during the previous eruptive series, and the Icelandic Meteorological Office warns that it is "life‑threatening", as the thin surface crust can collapse without warning, exposing molten lava beneath. The eruption did not cause any damage to infrastructure in the surrounding area.

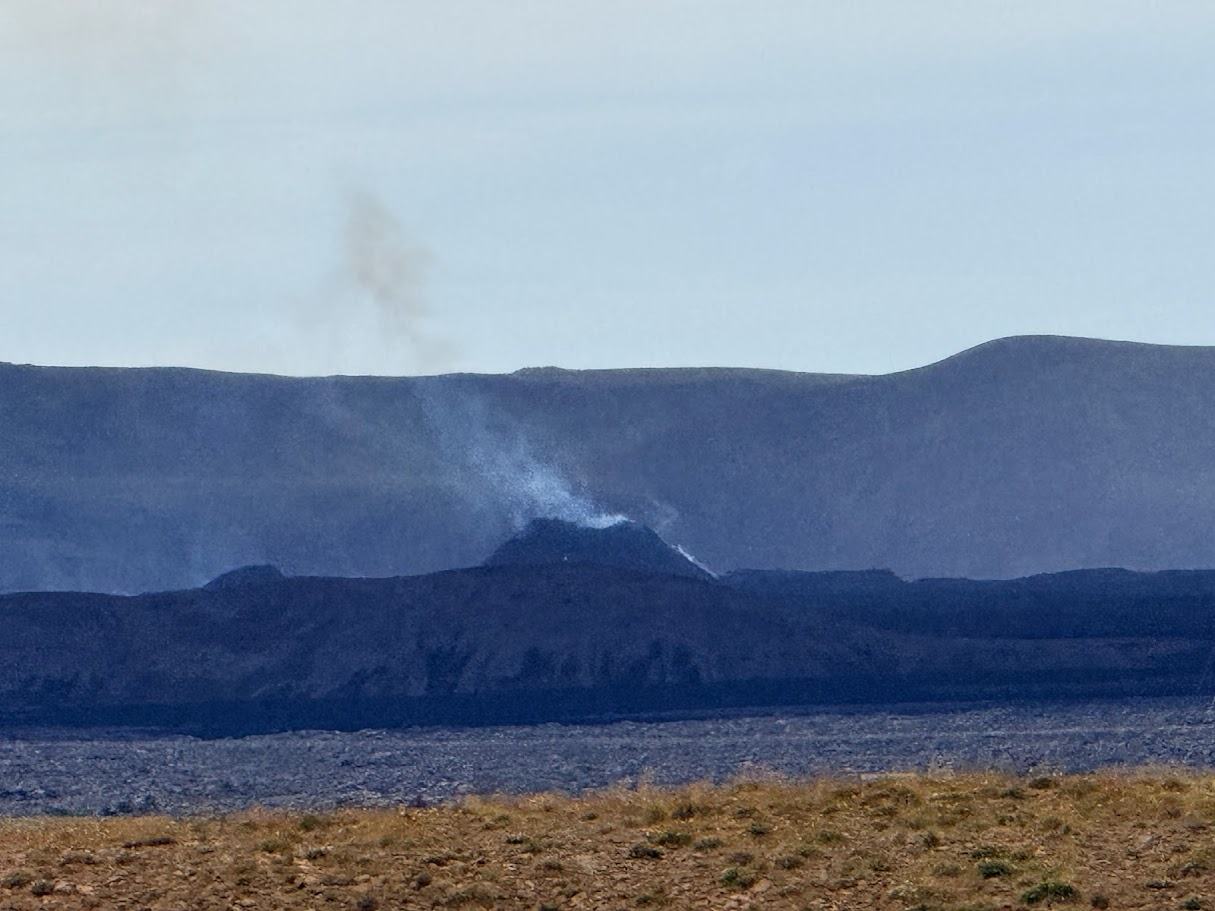
View of the last active crater from Route 41 (Reykjanesbraut), a few days after the eruption concluded

Warnings were issued shortly after the onset of the eruption due to elevated concentrations of volcanic gases. The highest sulfur dioxide (SO_{2}) levels were recorded in Njarðvík within a few hours of the eruption, peaking at 6,284 μg/m^{3} (2,398.21 ppbv), compared to typical background concentrations of less than 5 μg/m^{3} (1.91 ppbv). In the following days, a sulfur dioxide-rich plume drifted over Reykjanesbær and into the Capital Region, where SO_{2} levels also reached record highs for the current volcanic activity on the Reykjanes Peninsula—exceeding 2,000 μg/m^{3} (763.28 ppbv), compared against the same background levels of less than 5 μg/m^{3} (1.91 ppbv). About a week into the eruption, sulfur dioxide emissions from the fissure vent were around 100 kg/s (220 lb/s) but dropped significantly the following day to 25–44 kg/s (55–97 lb/s). Within two weeks, volcanic gas emissions from the eruption led to a mild but visible haze of sulfate particles (SO_{4}) across the country, formed as sulfur dioxide reacted with moisture and oxygen in the atmosphere. This led to an increase and temporary burden on clinics and local health centres, as people experiencing various symptoms sought medical advice. Despite the situation, specialists emphasised that the pollution was not a "poison gas". In early August, volcanic tremor and explosive activity declined, coming to a complete halt on 4 August. On 5 August, the eruption was declared over, as police-operated drone imagery confirmed the absence of activity within the craters.

== Wildfires ==
During the first weeks following the start of the March–May 2024 eruption, wildfires broke out on the Svartsengi area. The fires, unlike the extensive wildfires during the last Fagradalsfjall eruption in 2023, which spread across vast distances, were contained within a localised region. However, very dry soil and gentle breezes raised the risk of the fires' spread, especially with lava temperatures soaring between 700 and 800 °C (1,300 and 1,500 °F). Firefighting efforts, characterised by manual labour and the strategic use of tanker trucks—including a notably powerful truck from the Rescue Team in Vík í Mýrdal—were carried out by firefighters in Grindavík together with the Fire Protection Services of Árnessýsla and Suðurnes, as well as the Þorbjörn Rescue Team. Emergency crews successfully gained control over the wildfires at the beginning of April 2024, with most of the flames having been extinguished.

Minor wildfires broke out in the Svartsengi area again at the beginning of June 2024, shortly after the May–June eruption had commenced. Firefighters reported that while extinguishing the fires was manageable, they had to remain vigilant to prevent the fires from getting out of control. The fires were anticipated due to the dry period in the area following the onset of summer. A few days later, additional fires began in the area, similar to those previously extinguished. The firefighting efforts were well-supported by a strong labour force from Grindavík and additional teams from the Capital Region.

In late August 2024, wildfires broke out in several areas on the Reykjanes Peninsula due to the lava flow from the August–September 2024 eruption. The fire chief in Grindavík stated that the dry terrain and strong winds made it easier for the fires to spread. The area was used as a military training ground by the United States Army in the post-war period, making it inaccessible to fire trucks. The fires were initially too close to the lava field for emergency responders to intervene safely, but as they moved farther from the eruption site, more time became available to prepare for extinguishing them.

== Impact ==
=== Grindavík and residents ===
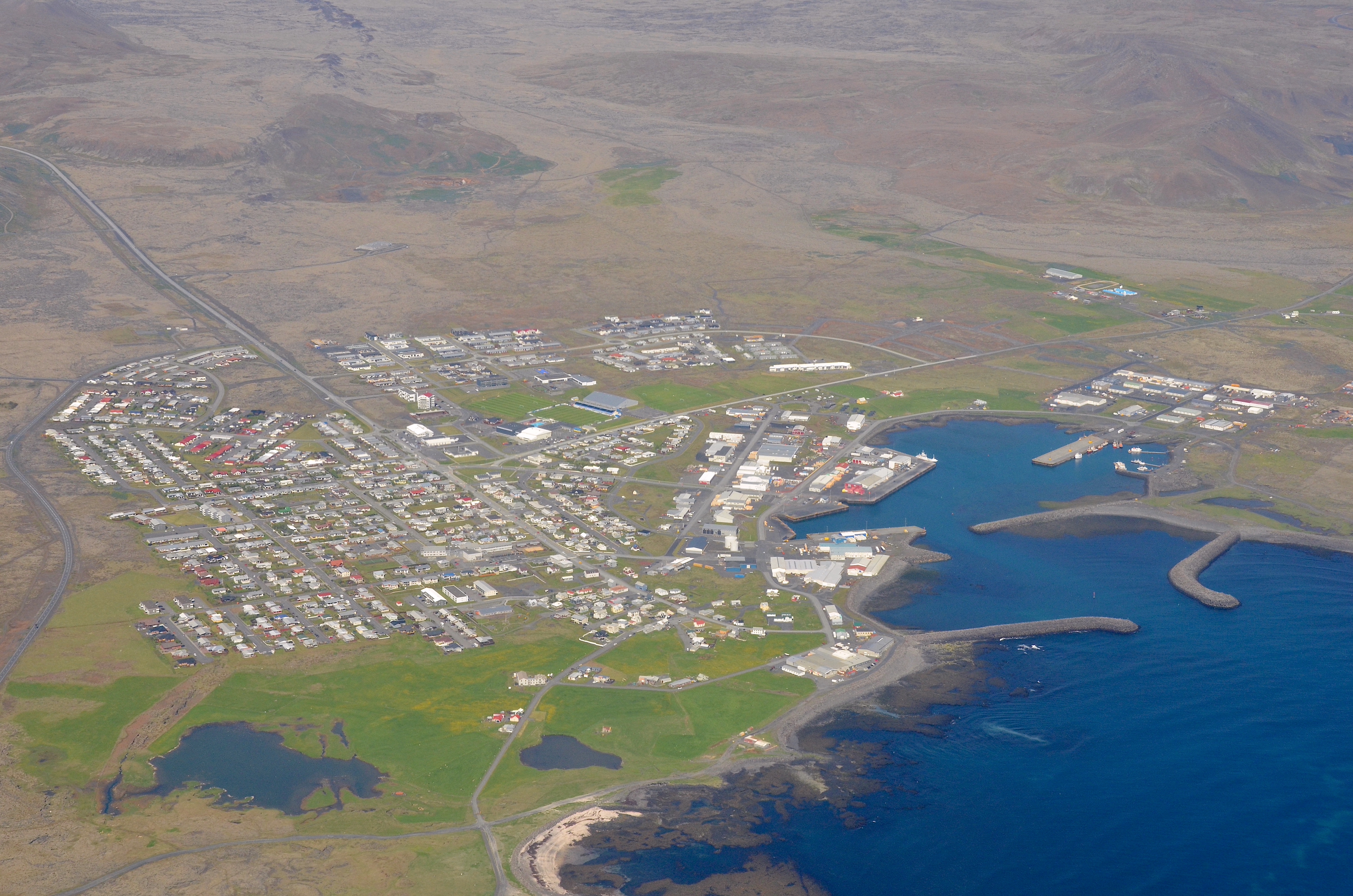
Aerial view of Grindavík before the disaster

The town of Grindavík is mostly abandoned due to the volcanic activity and its inhabitants have been evacuated, although they have been permitted to return for short visits to remove personal effects and goods from their homes and businesses. Additionally, homeowners are permitted to reside in their properties. This represents the first time that an entire community has been evacuated in Iceland since the eruption of Heimaey's Eldfell in 1973. The town was reopened to the public nearly a year after the disaster. Presently, it is difficult to predict when Grindavík will become habitable again; however, scientists anticipate that the current conditions could persist for months or even years. The current civil protection phase in the area is classified as "Alert Phase".

At 23:20 UTC on 10 November 2023, the Department of Civil Protection and Emergency Management held an emergency briefing to announce a mandatory evacuation in Grindavík. Prior to this, reports indicated that residents had already relocated due to persistent tremors that disrupted sleep and raised concerns about potential consequences. During the evacuation, the Icelandic Red Cross accommodated approximately 1,700 displaced residents at three emergency centres located in Keflavík, Kópavogur, and Selfoss. Of these, about 140 individuals spent the night in these centres, while the majority found alternative accommodations independently. All residents in the Grindavík area received an SMS message from 112, Iceland's emergency service, with the headline "EVACUATION". Notably, two individuals in the town inadvertently slept through the evacuation and were discovered by police the following morning. Evacuated residents from Grindavík have relocated to 24 different municipalities across Iceland, with most now residing in the neighbouring town of Reykjanesbær.

Following the 5.2 tremor on 10 November 2023, a state of emergency was declared, and evacuation plans were put into effect for Grindavík. This culminated in the relocation of nearly 4,000 residents, almost one percent of Iceland's entire population. The Department of Civil Protection and Emergency Management deployed the Icelandic Coast Guard Vessel Þór to the area "for safety purposes". It also closed all roads to Grindavík except for emergency and evacuation purposes. On 13 November, authorities allowed residents to return briefly to the town to retrieve their belongings. Boat owners were also allowed to remove their vessels from the harbour. The Icelandic government sought to accommodate displaced residents in holiday homes and little-used properties during the emergency in November and December 2023. The subsidence, faulting and earthquakes have caused widespread damage to properties and infrastructure in the town. Since the November 2023 disaster, subsidence, earthquakes, and lava flow have led to multiple disruptions in the town's electricity and hot-water services. The seismic activity has received significant coverage by the international media.

After the establishment of specific housing support in December 2023, the Icelandic government expected to assist around 700 residents, who are part of about 200 families, from the original 3,700 population of Grindavík. The project included purchasing up to 210 new apartments through two non-profit housing associations, primarily in the Reykjanes area and the Capital Region. This was to be supplemented by temporary financial support for increased housing costs, with the entire support system estimated to cost about ISK 220–240 million (US$1,800,000) per month, subject to a three-month reassessment with extensions. This initiative represented a comprehensive effort to provide both immediate and sustainable housing solutions for Grindavík's displaced residents. On 1 December 2023, the government, in partnership with the Government Property Agency, began seeking additional temporary rental properties from private and corporate owners to assist displaced Grindavík residents as part of a larger pre-established housing support programme that includes wage and rental subsidies. A week later, a platform for Grindavík residents was launched online, targeting temporary housing in the Reykjanes Peninsula, the Capital Region, and neighbouring municipalities. It enabled direct leasing between residents and property owners, supported by government rental subsidies. These measures were some of the first actions taken to support the displaced residents of Grindavík.

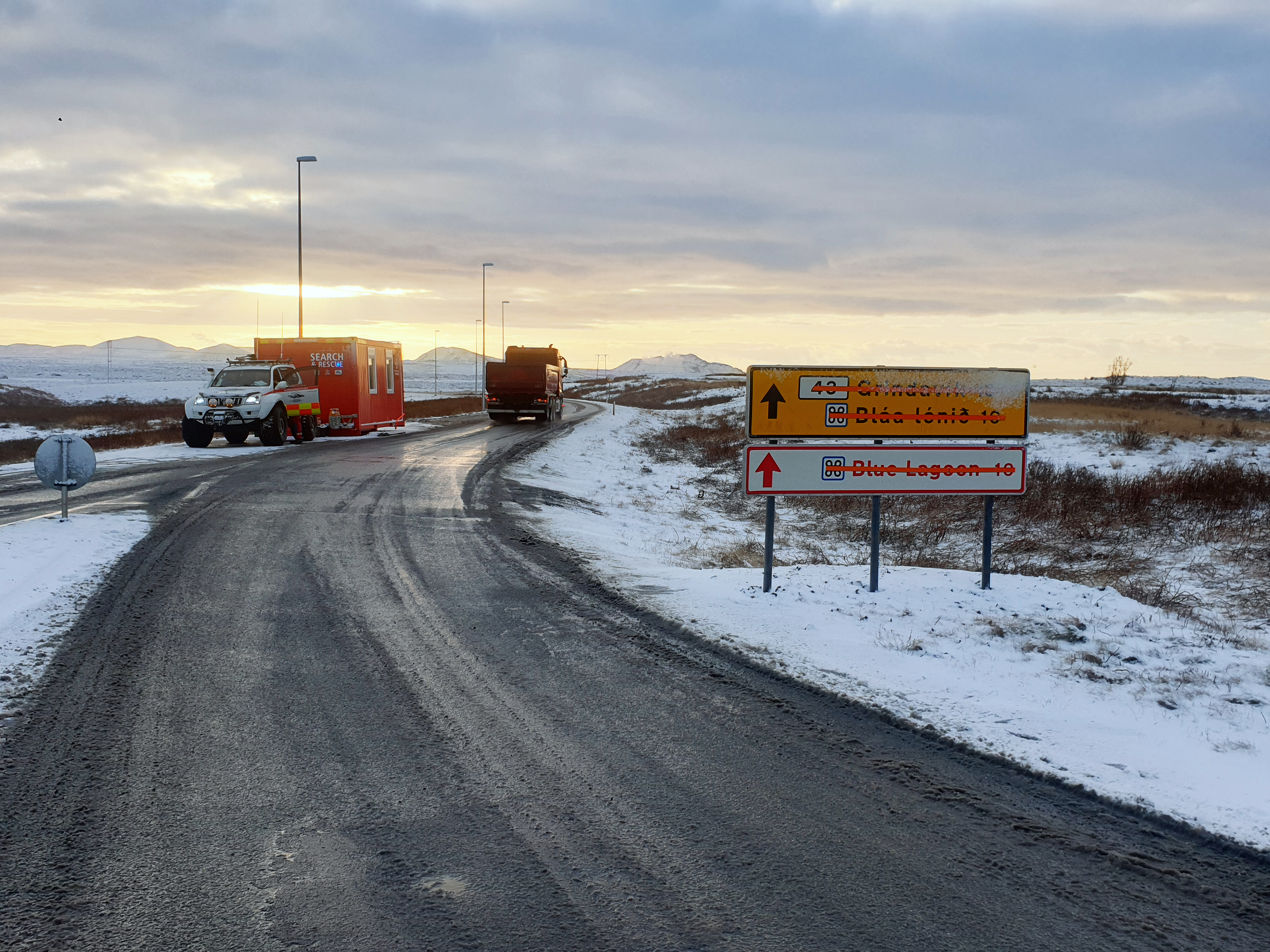
Closure of the road to Grindavík

In a collaborative response to the disaster and ongoing uncertainty in Grindavík, Iceland's major banks—Arion Banki, Íslandsbanki, and Landsbankinn, in partnership with Finance Iceland—agreed to waive interest and indexation on housing loans for Grindavík residents for three months. This relief applied to loans up to ISK 50 million (US$410,000). The measure, implemented in late 2023, aimed to provide equitable support, including options like deferred loan repayments. Each bank further outlined the specifics of these relief measures, ensuring they are tailored to the evolving needs of their customers in Grindavík. While these measures offered substantial relief, property owners facing irreparable damage to their homes were obligated to allocate a segment of their insurance compensation—earmarked primarily for on-site repairs or reconstruction—to cover a disposal fee. In cases where rebuilding at the original location was not permitted, property owners were then allowed to use their insurance proceeds to buy homes elsewhere. These measures were later succeeded by the government's acquisition of residential properties in Grindavík at the beginning of 2024.

On 23 February 2024, the Icelandic government enacted a law to acquire all residential real estate in Grindavík, initially estimating the cost at ISK 61 billion (US$500,000,000). However, the current projection indicates the total expenditure will be ISK 75 billion (US$610,000,000), including the assumption of all unpaid mortgages. The operation, under the supervision of the newly established real estate company Þórkatla, aims to relieve the residents' distress and uncertainty following seismic activities since November 2023. The law also granted Grindavík residents until the end of 2024 to decide if they wish to sell their property to the state. Homeowners then have a right of first refusal to repurchase their properties within three years after the law's enactment. As of 27 November 2024, Þórkatla, under the government's supervision, had received more than 900 submissions from Grindavík residents, with the vast majority of them completed. A total of approximately 930 properties are part of the project, with around 50% of them submitted in the latter half of March 2024, just weeks after the application process opened. Þórkatla will rent these properties at 25% of Suðurnes's market rate to provide temporary housing for residents who might want to live there. While industrial properties and businesses within the town will not be subject to acquisition, the Icelandic government will continue to offer various forms of aid, including support loans and wage assistance, consistently providing additional benefits to both the town's businesses and the evacuated citizens.

As part of the government's comprehensive plan, which includes efforts by the Department of Civil Protection and Emergency Management to prevent freezing damages in houses and ensure that Grindavík remains functional and safe for future habitation, up to 100 electricians and plumbers were mobilised to conduct critical repairs and upgrades, mostly from November 2023 to February 2024. This initiative also involved essential infrastructure work to secure and maintain the electrical and plumbing connections between the town and the power station, especially in January 2024, when Grindavík's water main was engulfed by lava from the eruption. Specialised teams were also deployed to fill in cracks and faults resulting from seismic activity. This effort has persisted to the present day, though it has included intermittent pauses.

The State Commissioner of Police, in consultation with the Police Commissioner in the Reykjanes Peninsula, downgraded the risk level in Grindavík from Emergency Phase to Alert Phase, which was effective from 23 November 2023 until the eruption on 18 December 2023. This decision, based on a new assessment by the Icelandic Meteorological Office (IMO), indicated a reduced likelihood of a sudden eruption in Grindavík. Residents and businesses in Grindavík were then permitted to enter the area between 07:00 and 21:00 UTC to retrieve valuables, attend to their properties, and conduct business activities. However, the town remained closed to the general public and unauthorised traffic. Safety measures, including limited vehicle access with restriction on certain types of transportation, constraints on essential services and a prepared evacuation plan, were established. The area, under continuous geological monitoring, is still considered dangerous. Residents were advised to keep records of valuables taken and to contact their insurance companies, and to be cautious as houses might be unsafe. Following the town's evacuation, a state of emergency (Emergency Phase) was declared with the onset of each subsequent eruption, highlighting the significant risk involved. Upon the end of each eruption, the alert level was systematically lowered to Alert Phase and subsequently, a few days afterward, to Uncertainty Phase. Up to 700 residents commute to work in the town daily, engaging in tasks such as discharging fishing vessels and conducting construction repairs on the harbour following the subsidence and earthquakes in the early phase of the seismic events.

Since the disaster in November 2023, there have been several instances of tensions and disobedience by the residents of Grindavík. In December 2023, a couple was caught staying at their home for several nights and were threatened with arrest due to the regulations in place at that time. On the first day of the May–June 2024 eruption, three residents of Grindavík refused to leave the town. The police did not use force as the evacuation was only an advisory from the authorities. However, the response teams later chose to evacuate, and the three individuals subsequently decided to leave as well since they were the only ones left in the town while the eruption was ongoing close by. Furthermore, three lawsuits have been filed against the state over access restrictions in Grindavík—by an individual, a labour union, and a group of employers and tour operators through a class action.

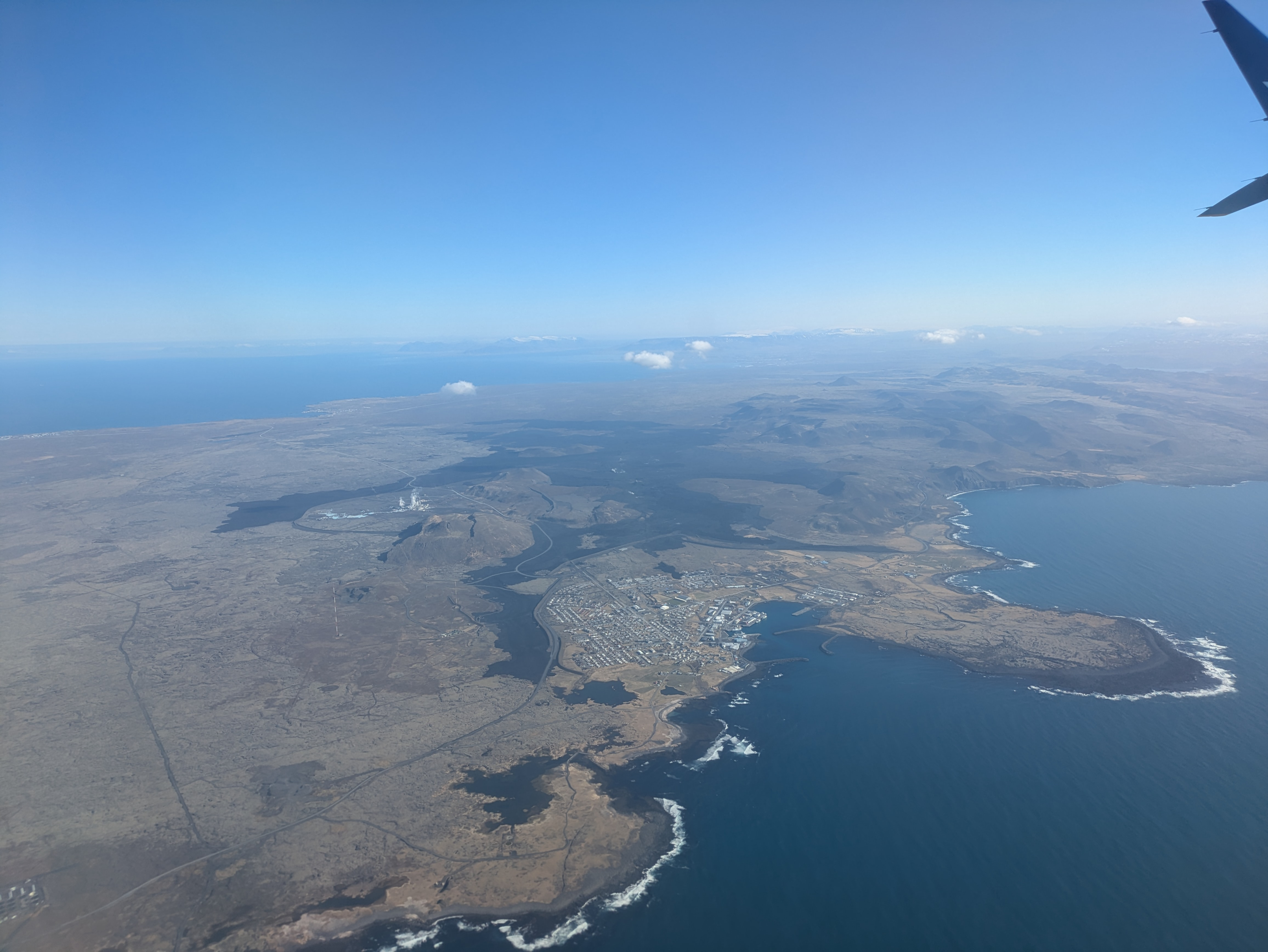
Image taken from an airplane shortly after departing Keflavík Airport on 22 April 2025, showing Grindavík's volcanic aftermath

In the aftermath of the November disaster, Grindavík was subjected to stringent regulations, which included specific opening and closing times. Authorities also created a live hazard map for residents and others in the area, which is regularly updated to reflect the current situation. Following the 10 January 2024 accident, in which a worker fell into a crack, Civil Defence imposed a temporary ban on all residency and operations in the town, deeming the conditions at the time unacceptable. In late February 2024, the State Commissioner of Police authorised near-unlimited access to the town for designated groups, albeit with a clear emphasis on the fact that "residents and employees enter the town at their own risk". The chief of police further emphasised that Grindavík is ill-suited for children due to the absence of functioning schools, the compromised state of infrastructure, and possible hidden faults in the town. Access was strictly limited to residents, employees, and authorised media personnel for almost a year until it opened for the public again in October 2024. While homeowners are permitted to stay overnight in their homes, the chief of police strongly advises against it. The number of people choosing to stay in Grindavík has increased over the past months, with the number of occupied homes now ranging from 40 to 60. Despite this, around 1,100 individuals are still legally registered as residents of the town. Since the reopening of Grindavík in October 2024, many tourists have visited the town to observe the damage caused by the November 2023 earthquakes. Authorities consider them a high-risk group, as they are less likely to be fully informed about the current situation.

The main concern and risk in Grindavík currently comes from the extensive cracks and faults that have appeared, most of which formed during the subsidence in November 2023. Some of these pre-existing cracks have expanded following subsequent eruptions, and additional new ones have also formed. Before the November event, authorities were cognisant of existing fissures; however, many structures and pieces of infrastructure were built over these old cracks, disregarding the potential for their reactivation after being dormant for more than 2,000 years. There are seven fracture zones in the Grindavík area; all of which have shown movement since November 2023. The largest crack, Stamphólsgjá, exceeds 30 m (98 ft) in depth and reaches up to 3 m (9.8 ft) in width. Since the onset of these events, specialists—including those from the Icelandic Road Administration—have been continuously monitoring and mapping both newly formed and previously unknown or concealed fractures that may pose risks to public safety. Their efforts involve the use of advanced tools such as drones and various geophysical survey instruments. Concealed fractures continue to be discovered, as many of the eruptions in the series either dilate pre-existing fractures or generate new ones. Primarily carried out in 2024, researchers used magnetic-field measurements collected using drones and on-foot magnetic surveys to map subsurface fractures and cavities beneath Grindavík. The survey comprised approximately 320 km (200 mi) of measurements: about 220 km (140 mi) of drone flight lines and 100 km (62 mi) surveyed on foot with magnetometers. Because the basalt beneath the town has strong magnetic properties, fractures and cavities can produce detectable anomalies in the local magnetic field, allowing concealed structures to be identified beneath soil, roads, buildings, and other surface cover. The magnetic data were compared with LiDAR measurements, photographs, older aerial imagery, and field observations. Selected sites were subsequently excavated to verify the interpretations. Several previously unknown fractures and cavities were confirmed, indicating that the method can provide a rapid means of identifying concealed geological structures and supporting hazard assessment. On 10 January 2024, an employee engaged in sealing these cracks fell into what was apparently the largest fault, which runs directly through the centre of the town.

To further enhance the existing security measures in Grindavík, which involved sending SMS warning messages to residents in the zone, emergency warning sirens underwent testing prior to the March–May 2024 eruption. Warning sirens have not been sounded in Iceland since April 2000 after they were subsequently decommissioned. Instead of warning sirens, a dial-out system was developed for all mobile phones. The warning sirens were, among other things, decommissioned as they were considered expensive and unreliable in operation. The system currently comprises three sirens in Grindavík, with additional sirens installed at the Svartsengi power station and the Blue Lagoon, which will go off in the event of an imminent eruption.

According to Grindavík's Planning and Environmental Department, more than 60 buildings have been classified as total losses following the November 2023 earthquakes, with demolition already underway. At least 40 buildings are expected to be demolished and the project is scheduled for completion by mid-2027. The affected structures include part of a nursing home, a recently renovated elementary school, and a gymnasium where the largest fissure had penetrated the inside football pitch. Additionally, there have been discussions about converting one of the affected buildings into a museum or other visitor attraction commemorating the events in Grindavík. Certain buildings will not be permitted to be reconstructed or expanded on their original sites and some structures will be methodically dismantled and subsequently reassembled at alternative locations. Along one street, nearly all buildings are slated for demolition. Remedial works to restore the town to a safe and functional condition were projected for completion in the first half of 2025, with a total estimated cost of ISK 470 million (US$3,800,000), split between the state at ISK 440 million (US$3,600,000) and the municipality at ISK 30 million (US$240,000). A future municipal land-use plan has also been proposed that, among other measures, prohibits new construction on mapped fracture zones. A decision was made to fully reopen Grindavík to the public on the morning of 21 October 2024, nearly a year after the disaster began, although previous safety advice from authorities remain in effect. To further emphasise the town's return towards normal function following the public reopening, the Grindavík municipal office also returned to Grindavík in March 2025, after its temporary relocation to Reykjavík in the wake of the November 2023 disaster. However, certain hazardous areas of the town remain fenced off. Three road closure gates, which had controlled all traffic into Grindavík since 10 November 2023, were removed, but could be reinstated if Alert Phase or Emergency Phase is reactivated.

Schools in Grindavík resumed in August 2026, nearly three years after the town was evacuated in November 2023. Approximately 40 students ranging from kindergarten through upper secondary school were enrolled, representing a substantial reduction from the approximately 550 students before the evacuation. Arrangements now include evacuation and safety plans for students and staff. This decision to resume schooling was made amid continued uncertainty as some geophysicists stated that reopening schools involved a degree of risk and emphasised the need to remain vigilant because of the possibility of renewed eruptions. Although the eruptive episode may have ended, continued land uplift may be an indication that further volcanic activity is possible. During the Krafla Fires, there were two intervals of nearly three years between eruptions, demonstrating that prolonged pauses can occur within a similar eruptive series. Earlier in 2026, the Icelandic government had opposed the announcement by the Grindavík municipal council that schools in the town would reopen, stating that the necessary conditions for doing so had not been established. The municipal council, however, argued that the resumption of schooling was a fundamental prerequisite for the restoration and long-term recovery of the town.

The earthquakes in Grindavík had a profound impact on infrastructure and residences, leading to over 500 reports of property damage to the Natural Catastrophe Insurance of Iceland. Of these, at least 74 properties were deemed uninhabitable, with three being completely destroyed by direct lava contact. As of November 2023, the insurance fund held approximately ISK 57 billion (US$460,000,000), with a total of over ISK 15 billion (US$120,000,000) anticipated to be disbursed for claims related to the ongoing seismic and volcanic activity. Two weeks following the beginning of the events, a thorough damage assessment was initiated and is still ongoing. The estimated damages to residential properties in the town are approximately ISK 6.5 billion (US$53,000,000). Initially, the total cost of all structural damages was projected to reach ISK 10 billion (US$82,000,000), but current estimates suggest it could rise to between ISK 16 and 17 billion (US$130,000,000 and 140,000,000). Since November 2023, the Icelandic government's total direct expenditure on the natural disasters in Grindavík and the surrounding area has reached roughly ISK 87 billion (US$710,000,000).

=== Blue Lagoon ===
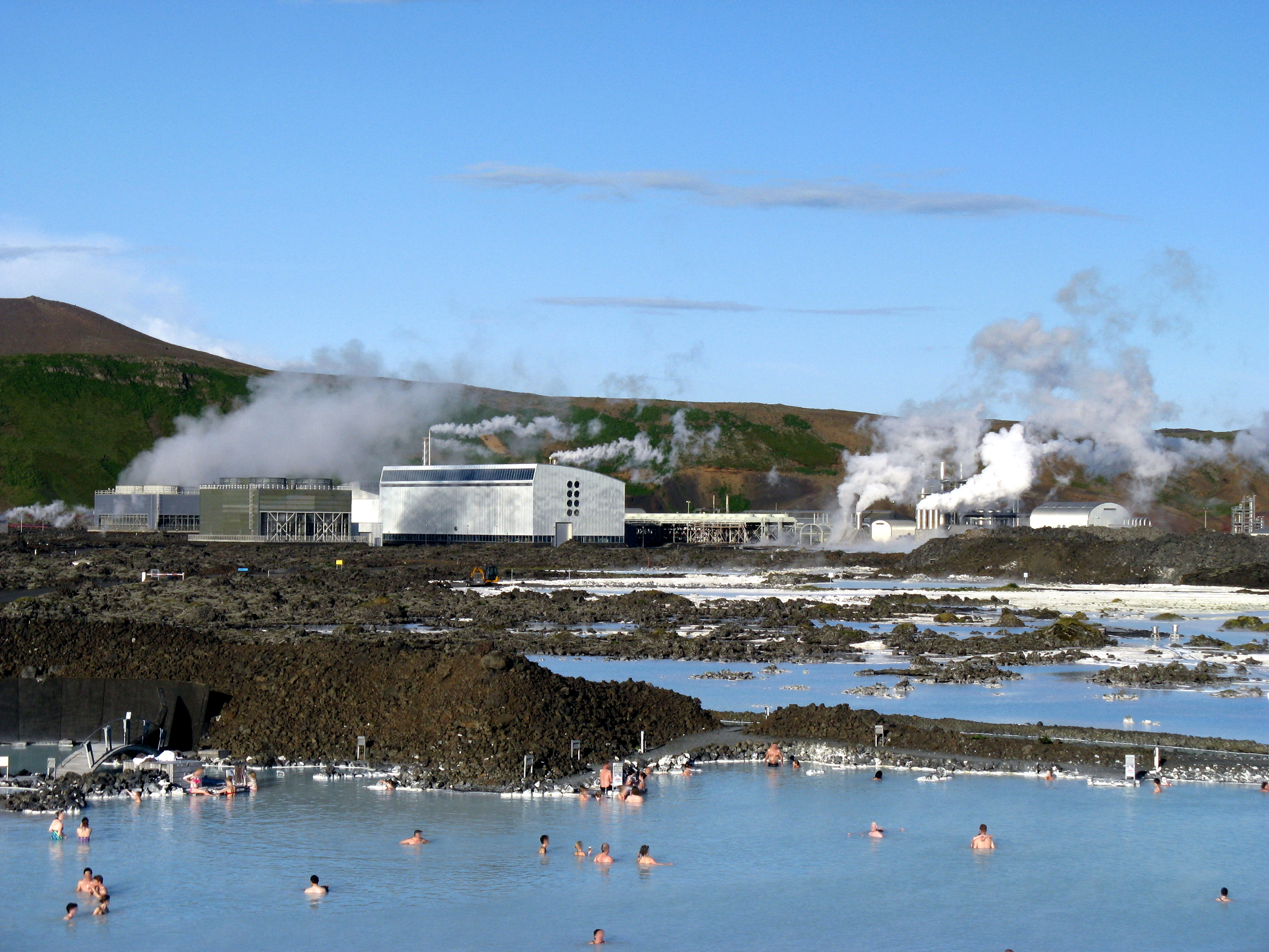
The Blue Lagoon and the Svartsengi power station behind it

The Blue Lagoon is currently open, with operational hours subject to adjustments based on forecasts of wind conditions and gas emissions, as well as any potential threats to nearby roads from volcanic activity. The hot springs area has repeatedly been closed and evacuated due to the earthquakes and eruptions. Although it has not been significantly damaged, lava has frequently engulfed nearby roads, necessitating the construction of new ones. Following the November 2023 earthquakes, the area was closed to the public for over two months due to safety concerns. The springs were closed for three weeks beginning with the onset of the March–May 2024 eruption due to their proximity to the volcanic activity and the continuous release of toxic gases. Towards the end of the same year, the springs remained inaccessible for more than two weeks due to the November–December eruption, which caused the engulfment of the parking lot and nearby roads. The lava field has partially encircled the Blue Lagoon area, with the nearest lava front less than 200 m (660 ft) away from the facility, which is safeguarded by an engineered barrier. By December 2024, more than a year after the seismic and volcanic activity began in November 2023, the Blue Lagoon remained closed for a total of four months, accounting for approximately one-third of the time since the events.

The site's management announced the site's closure to visitors from 9–16 November 2023 as a precaution following the earthquakes. Rocks dislodged by the earthquakes were reported to have fallen onto roads in the area, and 30 guests left the resort following a magnitude 4.8 tremor in the early hours of 9 November. In addition to these safety concerns, the closure was also implemented to reduce increased stress on staff. The management has assured that all staff will receive their full salaries during the closure period. Furthermore, guests who were evacuated as a result of the tremor will be provided with a full refund. Helga Árnadóttir, Director of Sales, Operations and Services at the Blue Lagoon, confirmed that the seismic activity at Svartsengi caused no visible damage or structural impairment to their facilities. The buildings, designed for earthquake resilience, remained intact and structurally sound. Although the geothermal spa itself remained undamaged during the first year following the onset of the disaster, its adjacent parking lot, which accommodated approximately 350 spaces along with a bus parking area and taxi stand, was overtaken by lava during the November–December 2024 eruption. No vehicles were present at the time. A temporary service facility, made from prefabricated shipping containers and positioned on a portion of the parking lot after the erection of a protective barrier, was also destroyed by advancing lava during the eruption. Additionally, a nearby helipad faced significant risk as the lava front progressed. In the weeks that followed, a new temporary parking lot was constructed, though it was considerably smaller, offering around 150 parking spaces. Experts noted that a significant portion of the infrastructure in the area would likely have been destroyed if not for the timely construction of the defensive barriers. Following the engulfment of its old parking lot in late 2024, the Blue Lagoon began redevelopment of its surrounding facilities and environment, with construction underway and completion expected in spring 2027.

The administrators of the Blue Lagoon extended the closure announcement five times after the evacuation in November 2023 due to continuing geological activity. Following permission from the chief of police, it reopened on 17 December 2023. Prior to reopening, the staff were trained in evacuation procedures to ensure preparedness for any emergencies, while the administration prepared an evacuation process, expected to take around two hours in case of emergency. Additionally, guests were to be informed about the current situation. Despite the advertised closure, staff members at the Blue Lagoon were observed in the spa's geothermal waters prior to the official reopening, assessing conditions. The Blue Lagoon remained open for just two days before it closed again on 18 December 2023 after the first eruption commenced only 2–3 km (1.2–1.9 mi) away. All guests and staff were evacuated from the site roughly one to two hours before the eruption. The Blue Lagoon reopened on 6 January 2024, with all facilities back in operation by 10 January. However, it was shut down once again on 14 January and promptly evacuated, but reopened on 20 January. It was safely evacuated at the start of the third eruption on 8 February 2024 but the hot springs were subsequently cut off by a fast-moving lava flow engulfing the northernmost stretch of Route 426 (Norðurljósavegur), its main access road. On 16 February, the Blue Lagoon reopened after the Icelandic Road Administration constructed a new gravel road within the defence barriers surrounding the hot springs, restoring access that had been cut off by a lava flow from the recent eruption.

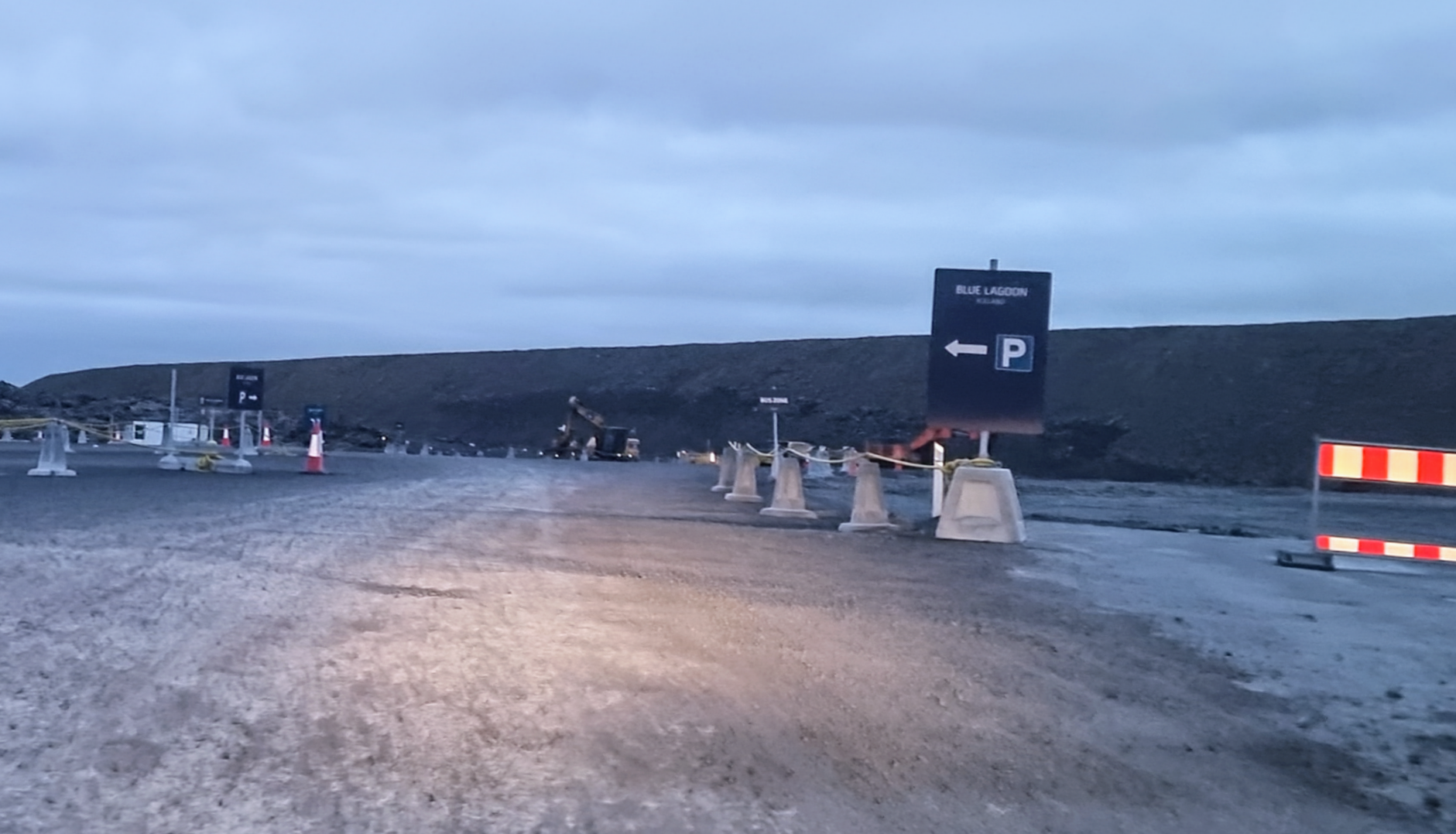
Blue Lagoon's new parking area inside the protective barriers

The Blue Lagoon was once again evacuated and temporarily closed on 2 March 2024 in anticipation of an imminent eruption but reopened two days later after no eruption occurred. The Blue Lagoon was evacuated and closed indefinitely on 16 March due to the onset of the fourth eruption. However, it reopened on 6 April after Route 43 (Grindavíkurvegur) was rebuilt following its engulfment by lava on 17 March. Following the fifth eruption, the Blue Lagoon was evacuated and closed 29 May–2 June 2024. It closed again on 8 June due to another lava engulfment of Route 43, but the road was rebuilt, and the facility reopened on 14 June. The Blue Lagoon was evacuated once more when the sixth eruption began on 22 August 2024, but it reopened just two days later on 24 August. On 20 November 2024, the facility closed following an eruption. The next day, lava inundated the main parking lot in front of the geothermal spa and the northern section of Route 426 (Norðurljósavegur). The Blue Lagoon partially reopened on 6 December, approximately 16 days after its closure, with a full reopening occurring a few days later. Due to lava flow rendering the original parking area inaccessible, a temporary shuttle service was implemented, transporting visitors from Grindavík to the facility. This arrangement remained in effect until a new parking lot, situated north of the Blue Lagoon and within the protective barriers, became available approximately one week after the reopening, following the rebuilding of Route 43 (Grindavíkurvegur) north of Svartsengi. Following a brief and minor eruption on 1 April 2025, the geothermal spa closed for the day and resumed operations on 2 April. Later that same year, the Blue Lagoon was closed and evacuated early on 16 July due to the imminent eruption, but reopened again in the evening of the same day. As with previous evacuations, guests of the Blue Lagoon's Retreat Hotel were temporarily relocated to other hotels.

The chief of police stated that maintaining operations at the Blue Lagoon is scarcely justifiable amidst an ongoing eruption due to the risk of air pollution compromising public health. Administrators, in consultation with authorities, regularly assessed whether it was safe to reopen the geothermal spa. On 20 March 2024, a staff member at the Blue Lagoon was hospitalised due to symptoms of gas poisoning amidst the eruption that began on 16 March, which had resulted in elevated levels of sulfur dioxide. The illness occurred while the employee was working at the hot springs. Though initial reports expressed concern for their health, the staff member ultimately made a full recovery.

In early August 2024, firefighters conducted drills using newly acquired high-capacity fire hoses to apply geothermal effluent from the Blue Lagoon onto solidified lava. These hoses, procured at a cost of nearly ISK 500 million (US$4,100,000) from the United Kingdom, extend to about 4 km (2.5 mi) and discharge approximately 750 L/s (200 US gal/s), with a vertical reach of up to 150 m (490 ft)—substantially surpassing the previous system's 35 m (115 ft) elevation. This sophisticated equipment was purchased following successful field trials conducted in late June 2024, during which the application of water to active lava flows yielded promising results. In response to these outcomes, authorities opted to invest in this advanced water pumping technology. Additionally, the fire department established a new role, "Lava Cooling Systems Manager", to oversee the operation and maintenance of the specialised equipment.

In the north-western section of the protective barriers surrounding the Svartsengi area, which includes the Blue Lagoon, the situation became critical during the November–December 2024 eruption as lava approached the point of overspilling. To mitigate the risk, 12 high-powered monitoring water cannons were installed along a 150 m (490 ft) stretch of the barrier's top edge, although not all were utilised simultaneously. Unlike conventional fire engine systems, these cannons were directly connected to excess water discharge from the Svartsengi power station, with a continuous supply potential of approximately 433 L/s (114 US gal/s). This excess water, a byproduct of the power station that also formed the Blue Lagoon, was used in a system implemented in collaboration with multiple fire departments to effectively cool the lava, successfully stabilising the flow and halting its progression. Officials subsequently declared the intervention a success as the lava ceased further encroachment.

=== Svartsengi power station ===
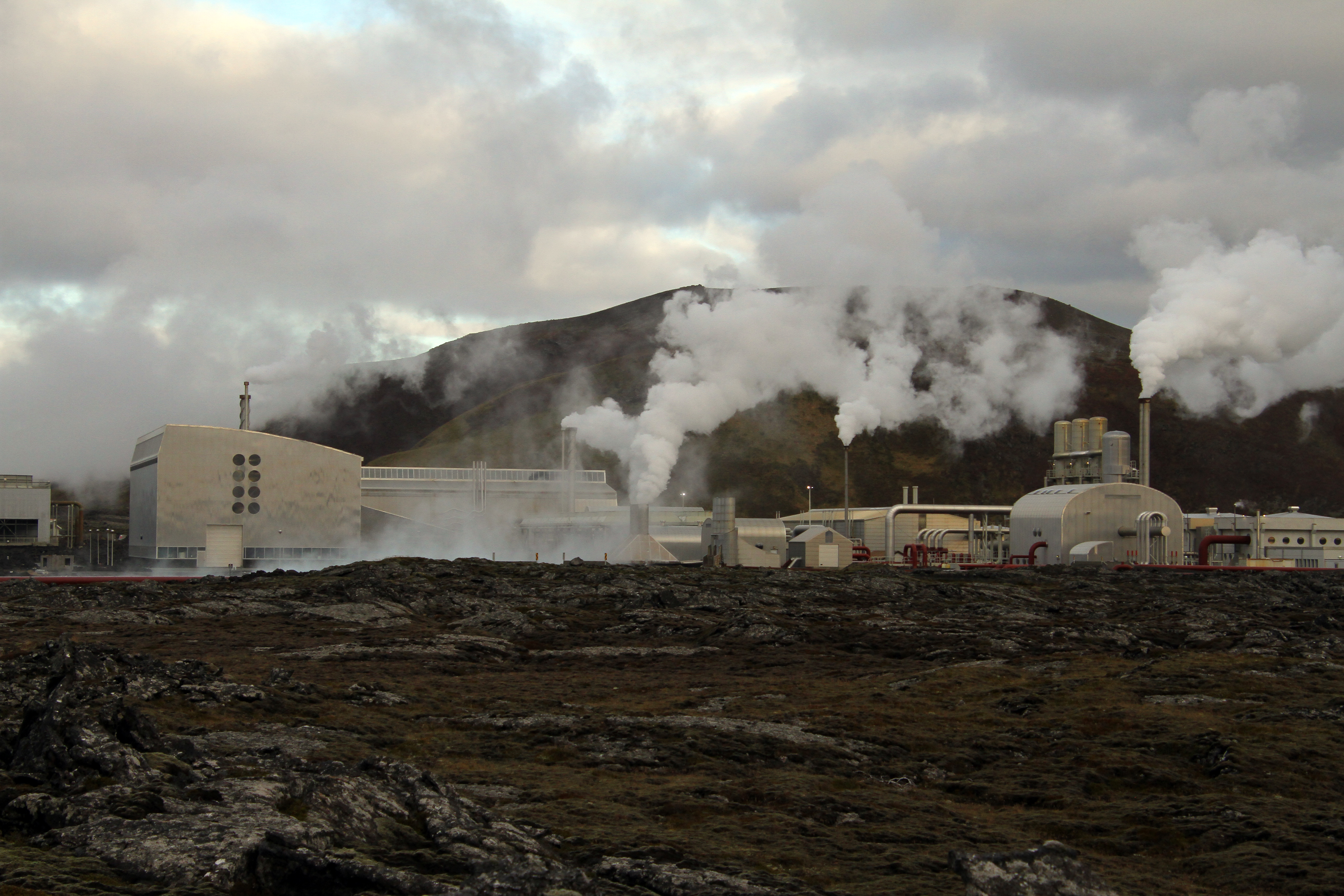
The Svartsengi power station in 2019

The Svartsengi power station was unoccupied and remotely controlled from the Reykjanes power station during the initial months following the November 2023 disaster. In 2024, the station was evacuated multiple times due to imminent eruptions and other perceived threats to staff safety. It experienced minimal impact from the earthquakes, with the only damage being "the interior furnishings and exterior walls, as well as considerable cracking in pathways and remote areas of the site". The power station continued to operate at its usual production levels for hot and cold water, as well as electricity, despite sustaining minor damage to the hot-water pipeline leading to Grindavík in the days preceding the 10 November 2023 earthquake swarm. Approximately 30,000 residents on the peninsula—representing about eight percent of Iceland's population—face the risk of losing essential heating if lava engulfs the facility, a situation that would persist until a new power plant is constructed. In November 2023, construction commenced on earth barriers designed to protect the power station by redirecting potential future lava flows. Additionally, transmission towers were elevated to accommodate the presence of the barriers.

Construction on an extension of the power plant began in late 2022 following extensive preparation, with an initial projected completion date of late 2025. Despite the start of events in November 2023, including earthquakes and volcanic eruptions, there was almost no change to the original plans, and the project was successfully completed on schedule at the end of 2025. Before the January 2024 eruption, HS Orka, the operator of the Svartsengi power station, introduced a novel early-warning system that may be a first in volcanic monitoring. This system issued an essential alert more than four hours before the eruption. Since November 2023, the boreholes, pre-dating their use in the advanced system, have been pivotal in predicting volcanic activities. Detecting pressure fluctuations, these boreholes have reliably signalled all eruptions in the series, demonstrating their pre-existing potential in volcanic surveillance and safety. The boreholes in the Svartsengi area not considered likely to affect the timing or characteristics of volcanic eruptions. Most of the boreholes extend to depths of approximately 2.5 km (1.6 mi), whereas the magma chamber beneath the area is estimated to begin at a depth of around 4 km (2.5 mi). Fibre-optic cables have also been used to detect and characterise seismic and volcanic activity—tracking tremors, dike intrusions, and other magmatic processes.

During the January 2024 eruption, lava flowed over both the hot water and cold water pipelines connecting the Svartsengi power station to Grindavík. These pipelines sustained damage, resulting in a temporary service cutoff. Prior to the January 2024 eruption, preparations were underway to install a new, more resilient hot-water pipeline as a precaution against future lava flows. However, the protective covering was not yet completed, leaving both pipelines exposed when lava flowed over them. Despite the damage, the hot water supply was partially restored through the recent pipeline within two days, even though it had buckled under the intense heat of the lava, causing a significant leak of 40–50 L/s (11–13 US gal/s) from the water main—approximately half of the total supply capacity to Grindavík. Around six weeks later, a new bypass pipeline was constructed over the recently formed lava field, similar to the operation carried out north of the Svartsengi area following the February 2024 eruption. As with all defence barriers, the project was overseen by Civil Defence. Simultaneously, an underground power cable was severely affected by the January 2024 eruption due to the immense heat and pressure exerted by the overlying lava, causing a temporary outage in half of the town. However, as the town was largely uninhabited at the time, the impact of the outage did not constitute an emergency. Grindavík operated on reserve power while the situation unfolded. To enhance the town's electricity resilience, a new overhead power line on pylons was constructed above the recent lava field, restoring power more than a week later. This design allows for quicker repairs should future lava flows damage the infrastructure.

The eruption of 8 February 2024 produced a lava flow that came close to the power station. It cut off the northern access road to the geothermal plant (though the southern access road was unaffected) and destroyed part of the Njarðvíkuræð pipeline supplying hot water from Svartsengi to Reykjanesbær, Suðurnesjabær, Vogar, and Grindavík. Around 20,000 people in the area were reported to have been cut off from the hot water supply. Residents of the peninsula were warned to use hot water and electricity sparingly. Schools similarly affected were closed. Keflavík Airport also suffered utility interruptions on the day of the volcanic event. The hot-water system went offline, and later that same day a separate fault in the cold-water main further disrupted services. Cold-water flow wasn't reinstated until 9 February, and hot water only resumed on 12 February. Although flight schedules remained unaffected, a number of lavatories stayed closed because of the cold-water shortage; staff placed portable heaters and handed out blankets as the indoor temperature dropped. The airport's electrical network, however, continued to operate without issue. Despite significant damage caused by the eruption on local infrastructure, the Capital Region was unaffected as it operates within a different geothermal energy distribution system. The Icelandic government declared a state of emergency in response to the hot water crisis. While the Reykjanes power station and the wider Icelandic grid can supply electricity if the Svartsengi line is cut off, the capability to deliver hot water, a critical function of the Svartsengi power station, cannot be replicated. At the time of the eruption, temperatures in the area reached as low as −14 °C (6.8 °F). The shortages contributed to the closure of schools, public pools and sport facilities in the area on 9 February.

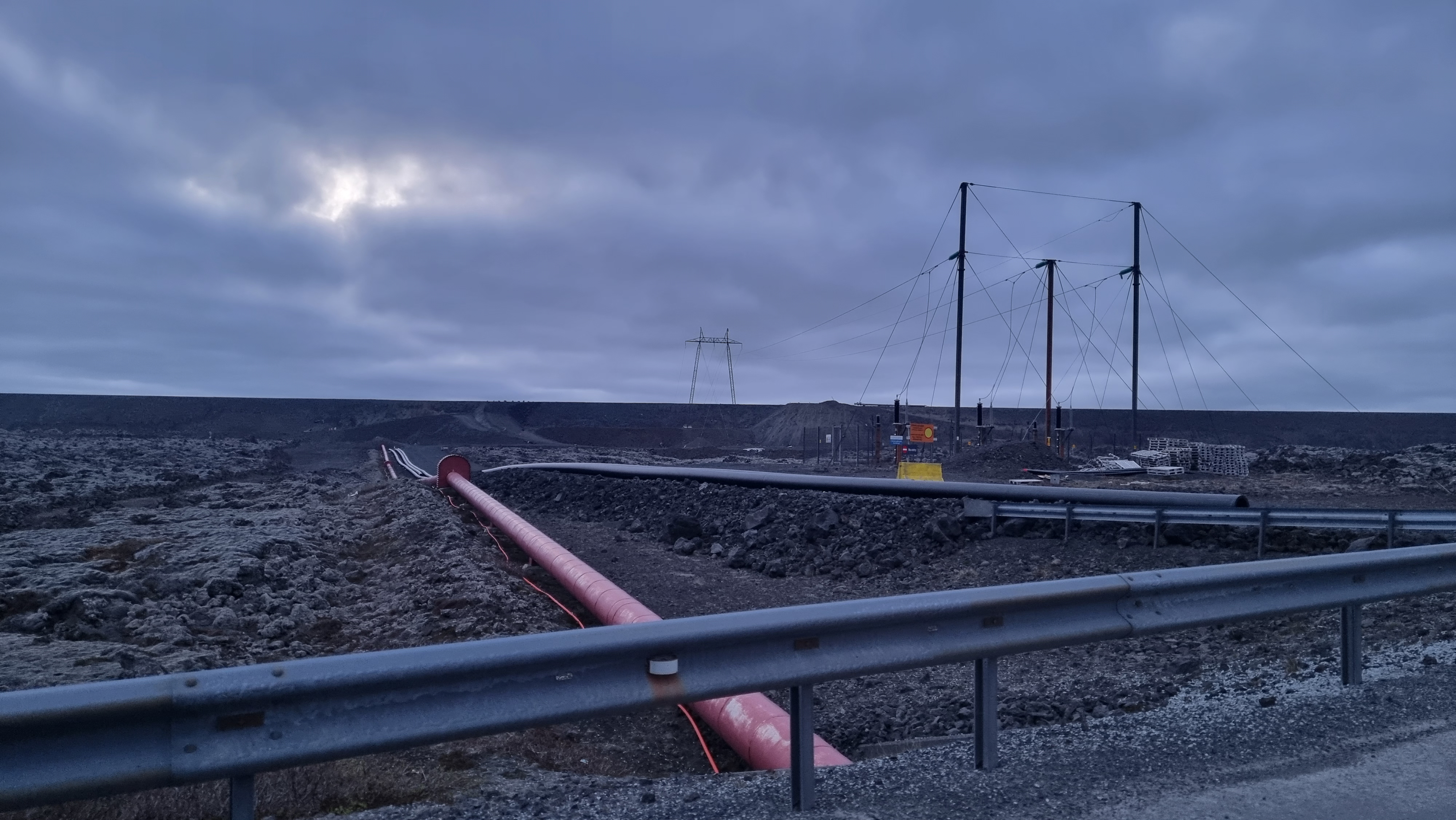
Hot-water pipeline and power lines leading from Svartsengi power station through the protective barriers

The repair and reconnection of Njarðvíkuræð hot-water pipeline was completed on the afternoon of 9 February 2024, approximately 30 hours after it was breached, restoring the supply of hot water to the wider Reykjanes area. Workers managed to splice together the undamaged sections of the old pipeline with the new underground system, often working through the night. In the weeks leading up to the February 2024 eruption, workers had been constructing an underground bypass pipeline parallel to an older one, designed to be more resistant to damage from lava flows. This was done before any lava had reached the area. The plan was to link the intact section of the old pipeline, unaffected by the lava, to the new underground pipeline at both ends, outside the lava field formed in the February eruption. Despite these efforts, the newly constructed bypass pipeline collapsed under the pressure of the lava flow late evening on 9 February. Immediately, workers started to construct a new pipeline, which was placed on top of the fresh lava. Around 50 hours later, on 12 February, water began flowing through the new pipeline. A few weeks after the success, workers completed burying the new pipeline in the fresh lava, ensuring it is now underground and protected from potential future lava flows. Lava from the May–June 2024 eruption came within 700 m (2,300 ft) of the power station's pipeline in the north, although it caused no danger. Authorities stated that they were prepared for the possibility of lava flowing over the pipeline, as it had been reinforced with soil fill. In the November–December 2024 eruption, lava flowed over the pipeline without causing any damage, although it was stated that it would have been "very serious" if the pipeline had been compromised.

The prospect of protecting the Njarðvíkuræð hot-water pipeline leading from the plant was considered extremely challenging, as it was situated above ground on stilts. Prior to the eruption in February 2024, plans were established to bury a new underground bypass pipeline, shielding it from potential lava damage, and preparing it for potential connection to the ends of the old pipeline in the event of engulfment. The eruption on 8 February resulted in the destruction of a segment of the old pipeline just north of Svartsengi and the subsequent collapse of a section of the new underground bypass pipeline on 9 February. Svartsengislína power line leading from the power station had previously been protected with barriers around the base of the transmission towers; when the same eruption encircled the structures north of the power station, causing no damage. Following the February 2024 eruption, authorities decided to alter the route of the power line north of Svartsengi and construct three new transmission towers farther east of the original path. This adjustment was made to reduce the risk of future damage from lava flows. However, the same power line south of the power station was severely damaged in the May–June 2024 eruption, as several transmission towers caught fire from the intense heat of the advancing lava, and one ultimately collapsed after its foundation was compromised. West of this zone, a guy-wire from a mast at a NATO telecommunications facility snapped due to the proximity of the same lava flow, posing a temporary threat to the station. A barrier had previously been constructed specifically to protect the telecommunications station.

In early summer 2024, a new low-temperature geothermal well was discovered as part of an experimental project led by HS Orka, Verkís, Iceland GeoSurvey, and more contractors, under the leadership of the Ministry of the Environment, Energy, and Climate. The initiative was launched following an emergency in February 2024, when the entire Suðurnes Peninsula lost its hot water supply for several days due to lava flow disrupting the main pipeline from the Svartsengi power station to local towns. Prior to this incident, authorities had not planned to identify new backup boreholes. The newly discovered well, located in the Rockville Zone north of Keflavík Airport—an area formerly occupied by a United States Army radar station from 1953 to 1997—produces approximately 50 L/s (13 US gal/s) of water at temperatures exceeding 85 °C (180 °F). This breakthrough in geothermal resource development has been hailed as a significant enhancement to the peninsula's energy security. In addition to this discovery, two other boreholes have been drilled at separate locations to prepare for the construction of more emergency heating plants. These boreholes are the first to be drilled in the area since the Svartsengi power station was established in the late 1970s. With the new well, it is now possible to supply hot water to local towns should the Svartsengi power station be disrupted—or in the worst-case scenario, if the station were to be engulfed by an eruption. The output from this emergency borehole is limited and is primarily intended to prevent freezing damage to pipes in local properties. The first of these heating plants became operational in February 2025, with another currently under development. Earlier, in November 2023, efforts had already begun in the municipality of Garður to establish a backup water source, serving as a precautionary measure in case the water collection facility near the Blue Lagoon is affected by future lava flows.

During the November–December 2024 eruption, two transmission towers north of Svartsengi were at significant risk as lava drew closer to the protective filling at their bases, slowly approaching their concrete foundations and steel frames. One of the towers was eventually destroyed by the advancing lava flow; however, it was an older structure belonging to the original power line route. Mitigation measures included deploying a fire truck to direct water jets onto the lava flow, with the goal of reducing its speed or altering its course to preserve the tower's structural stability. Severe thermal exposure from the lava caused the electrical conductors to tear and separate, temporarily disrupting electricity supply to Grindavík, a town that has faced frequent power outages during the ongoing volcanic series activity. In response, the power supply was automatically rerouted to the Reykjanes power station as a fail-safe backup system, ensuring near constant electricity delivery to the peninsula. Subsequently, a decision was made to construct a taller transmission tower at the inner edge of the defence barriers, with plans to elevate the existing electrical conductors by 12–14 m (39–46 ft) above ground outside the barrier to mitigate the risk of future lava flow damage. During the November–December 2024 eruption, lava advanced toward a water collection area operated by HS Veitur, which supplies cold water to Reykjanesbær and Suðurnesjabær on the Reykjanes Peninsula. Despite its proximity, the site was not at immediate risk.

=== Barriers and roads ===
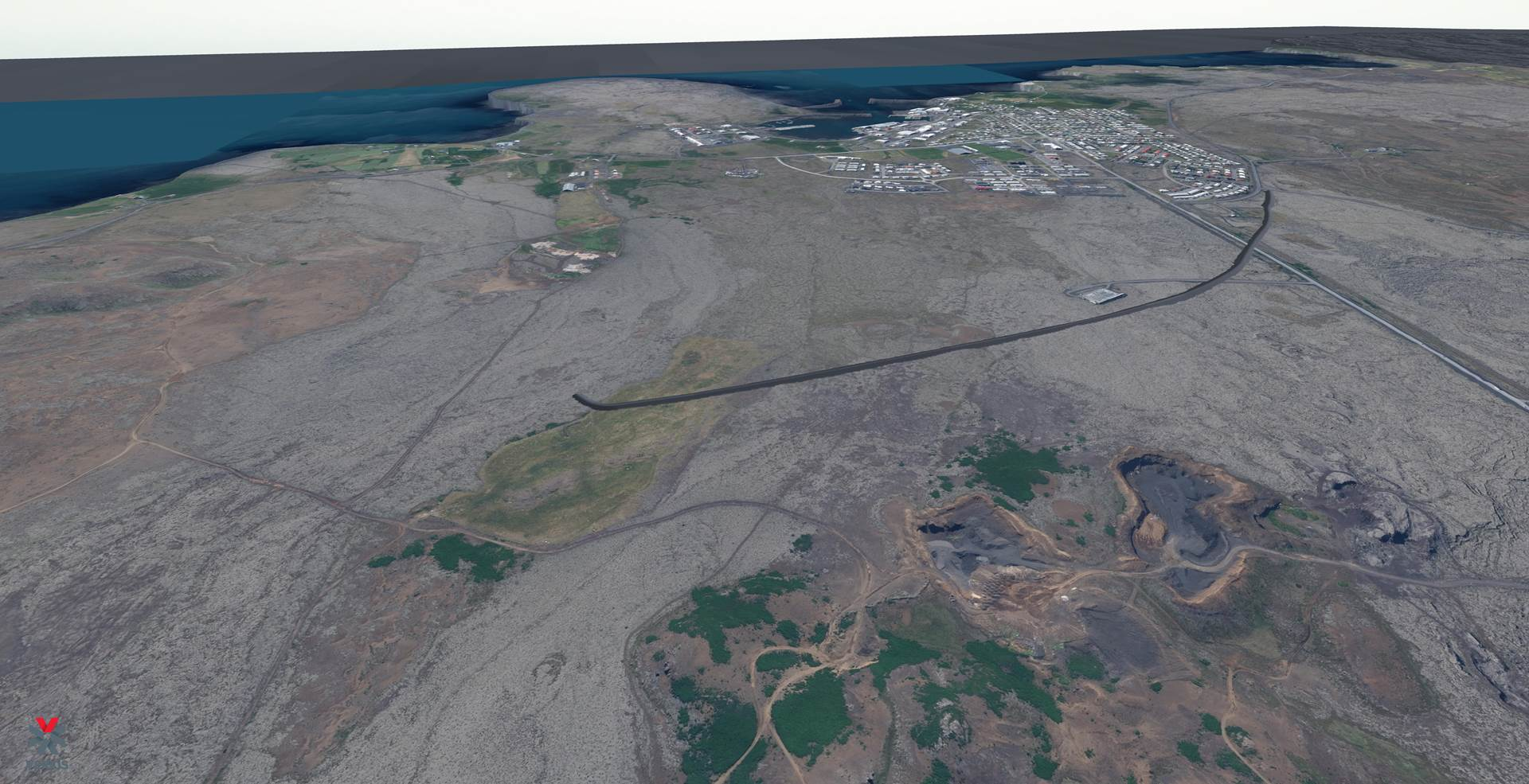
A design of the first phase of the protective barriers around Grindavík

A strategic plan for the construction of protective barriers had been established well in advance of the recent seismic disturbances in the area. The initiation of this plan was placed on hold, as there was no pressing threat of a volcanic eruption, coupled with the significant environmental repercussions involved. However, on 10 November 2023, with earthquake activity intensifying, a fleet of lorries began transporting materials to the designated site near the Blue Lagoon and the Svartsengi power station. This operation was promptly suspended due to concerns that a potential eruption later that day could put workers in danger. The construction work was officially resumed on 13 November, following the Althing's approval of a bill proposed by then-Prime Minister Katrín Jakobsdóttir. Following this, workers began assembling filler materials into barriers at the planned sites. The construction of the barriers was almost complete when the 18 December 2023 eruption occurred. Once it was safe for workers to resume, they were quickly sent back to the site to finish the remaining filling work on the barriers.

Construction of protective barriers around Grindavík, for which plans were already in place prior to the eruptions, officially began on 2 January 2024. The project, initiated from the eastern end, involved erecting a barrier extending over 2 km (1.2 mi). The first phase of construction aimed to reach an average height of around 4 m (13 ft), although this may vary in different locations. The design of the barrier, guided by lava flow simulations, specifically targeted the areas at highest risk. On 21 March 2024, the advancing lava began to fill a stone quarry previously utilised for sourcing materials for the barriers. However, workers are still able to obtain materials from alternative locations. Additionally, recently solidified lava from the eruption was used as a resource for assembling the protective structures. In late March, authorities decided to raise the height of the barriers north-east of Grindavík in response to the thickening lava field from the March–May 2024 eruption, which posed a risk of overspill. Construction crews worked around the clock on the project. By the end of April 2024, lava began to creep over the same section of the barriers, though it posed no immediate threat. At the beginning of October 2025, authorities announced another increase in the height of the barriers north of Grindavík, raising them by 2–3 m (6 ft 7 in – 9 ft 10 in) along a 450 m (1,480 ft) section.

Construction of another barrier commenced on 6 May 2024, following approval from then-Justice Minister Guðrún Hafsteinsdóttir. This decision was made after she received a memorandum from the Department of Civil Protection and Emergency Management a week earlier. Initially intended to be the final initiative by the Icelandic government regarding the eruptive series in Sundhnúksgígar, the May–June 2024 eruption necessitated an additional protective barrier. This new barrier, located inside the perimeter of the existing barriers and closer to Grindavík, was designed to proactively safeguard against potential lava overflow, particularly in scenarios involving thin-flowing pāhoehoe lava. The structure stands 5 m (16 ft) high and extends between 0.8 and 1 km (0.50 and 0.62 mi) in length. A team of approximately 30 to 35 individuals worked day shifts on this project, completing the barrier in June 2024.

On 14 January and 29 May 2024, two separate lava flows engulfed Route 43 (Grindavíkurvegur) south of the Svartsengi power station and the Blue Lagoon. On 8 February, 17 March, 8 June, and 21 November 2024, different lava flows overtook the same road north of these landmarks. Route 426 (Norðurljósavegur) was covered by lava on 8 February and 21 November 2024 north of Svartsengi, and on 29 May south of Svartsengi in the same year. On 29 May 2024, Route 425 (Nesvegur) was overtaken by lava for the first time. In total, lava flowed over three different roads, five different sections, during five distinct eruptions, for a total of nine occurrences. These incidents repeatedly severed Grindavík's main access to the northern peninsula, necessitating the rapid construction of temporary gravel roads over freshly cooled lava, with road alignments sometimes adjusted to accommodate the altered terrain. To date, approximately 9–10 km (5.6–6.2 mi) of new roads have been constructed, though most have been permanently lost due to repeated lava flows over the same sections.

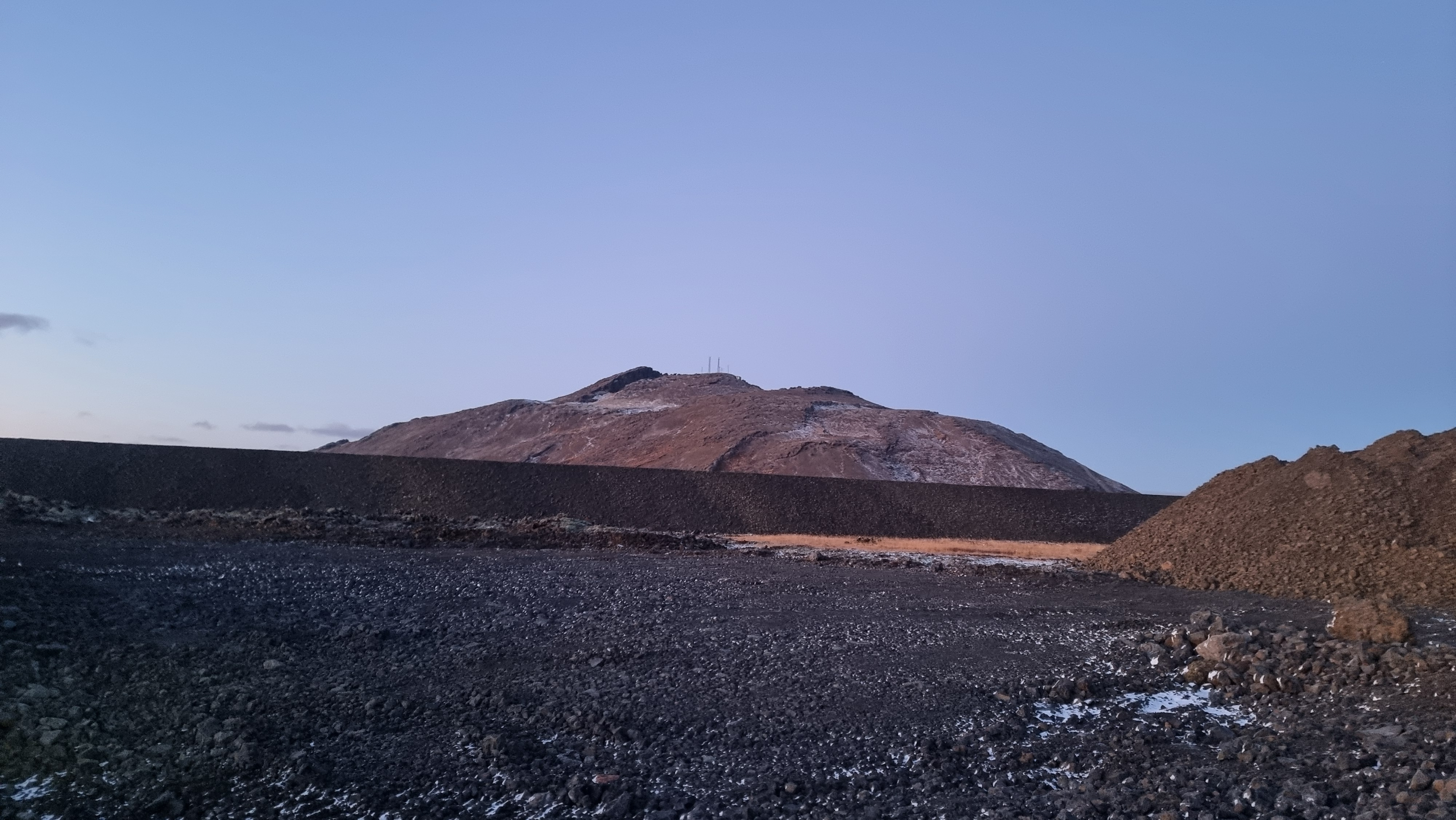
Protective barrier constructed between Grindavík and Þorbjörn

In the early stages of the March–May 2024 eruption, the encroaching lava threatened Route 427 (Suðurstrandarvegur) as it amassed against the eastern protective barrier of the town and advanced towards the sea to the south. This put two of the three crucial roadways linking Grindavík at risk, sparing only Route 425 (Nesvegur). Concerns grew as there was a chance the lava would make it to the ocean near the road, potentially causing minor explosions and emitting toxic gases like hydrochloric acid (HCl) due to chemical reactions with the sea. A zone extending 500 m (1,600 ft) from the anticipated point of marine entry was deemed critically dangerous to human safety. However, these risks were allayed when the lava halted approximately 300 m (980 ft) from Route 427, just days after the eruption began. Since then, the lava front has remained unchanged.

On the evening of 20 June 2024, lava began to overspill a section of the barrier north-west of Sýlingarfell mountain after accumulating north and south of the protected Blue Lagoon and Svartsengi area. Before the overspill, workers had already begun efforts to stop or slow down the lava by bulldozing old soil over it and using at least three firefighting trucks along with equipment from Keflavík Airport and Grindavík to pump water via fire hoses, with "quite good results". This marks the first such lava mitigation attempt since the 1973 eruption in Heimaey. New roads were not constructed until the eruption ceased later in June. Most have already been rebuilt with base layers and gravel wearing courses over the newly solidified lava. The completion time of the project depended on the temperature of the lava. In the event of an imminent lava flow approaching the defence barriers, gaps in the protective wall that serve as road access points are temporarily sealed using bulldozers to maintain the integrity of the barrier. Once the volcanic hazard has subsided and the area is deemed safe, the gaps are cleared and reopened to restore transportation access.

During the May–June 2024 eruption, the largest to date at that time, lava flowed over three road sections on the day it began: Route 43 (Grindavíkurvegur) south of Svartsengi, the southernmost part of Route 426 (Norðurljósavegur), and for the first time, Route 425 (Nesvegur) just west of the town. Around 10 days after the eruption began, on 8 June, lava also flowed over the northern part of Route 43. Moreover, the eruption threatened Route 427 (Suðurstrandarvegur) for a period of time. In mid-June, authorities observed that the lava was nearing the top of the north-eastern section of the Svartsengi barrier, which safeguards the power plant and the Blue Lagoon. Consequently, they decided to heighten the existing barriers, which have now reached a height of 25 m (82 ft). However, as the lava began to breach these barriers, they resolved to construct a new one within the existing defence perimeter in the Svartsengi area to provide enhanced protection for these critical infrastructures. They also decided to close a geographical gap between the mountain Þorbjörn and the area surrounding Hagafell, as well as reinforce the existing barriers most at risk of lava overflow.

After the August–September 2024 eruption, it became clear that the lava field was fairly close to Route 41 (Reykjanesbraut), Iceland's critical road linking the capital Reykjavík to Keflavík International Airport. Volcanologist Þorvaldur Þórðarson has cautioned that a new eruption on the Reykjanes Peninsula could result in lava reaching Route 41 within a day, or even just a few hours, if it matches the intensity of the most powerful eruptions in the volcanic series. Such an occurrence has not been documented in this area over the past 13,000 years. While no decisions have yet been made regarding the construction of protective barriers, plans are in place to safeguard the road if and when the lava flow threatens it. The closest lava flow is currently about 2.7 km (1.7 mi) from this vital infrastructure. Protective barriers for the town of Vogar, located north of Route 41, were considered after lava flow simulations indicated a potential, though unlikely, risk of lava reaching the area in the future.

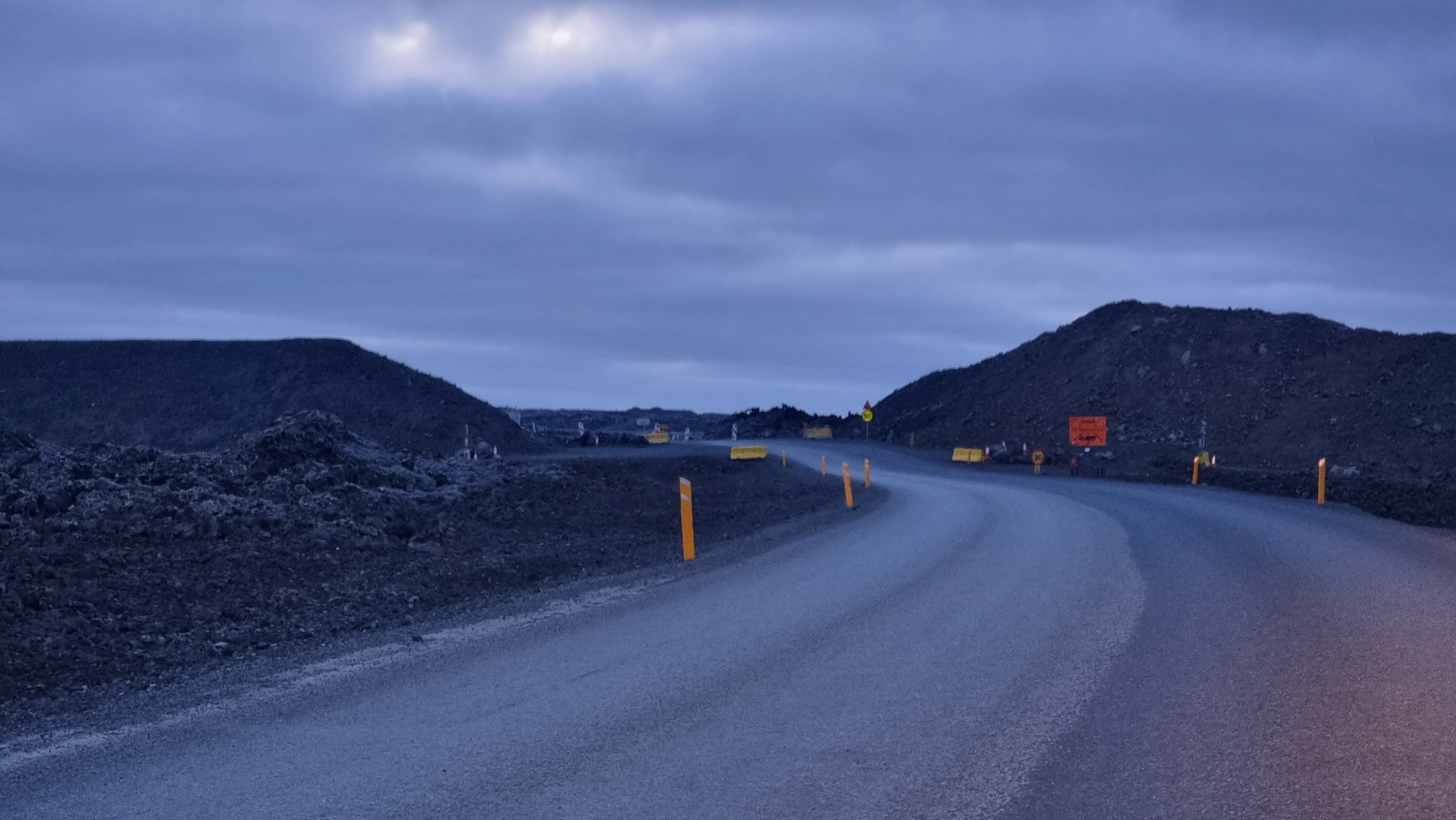
Opening in protective barrier for transport into and out of the Svartsengi area; bulldozers push in material to seal it during eruptions

In the November–December 2024 eruption, lava advanced along the northern and north-western sides of Svartsengi's protective barriers, completely submerging the Blue Lagoon's entire parking area and the main section of the Route 426 (Norðurljósavegur) access road. While no vehicles were damaged, a temporary prefabricated service building constructed from shipping containers was engulfed by the lava. Late on the second day of the November–December 2024 eruption, authorities decided to raise the north-western section of the barrier protecting the Blue Lagoon and the Svartsengi power station by 3–4 m (9.8–13.1 ft), as the lava had nearly reached the barrier's height. At the beginning of 2025, the barriers surrounding the Svartsengi area reached a maximum height of 17 m (56 ft). Construction crews also utilised newly solidified lava to augment the barrier. Workers operated around the clock to complete the project.

In response to these developments, the Icelandic government implemented a 0.008% additional property tax, levied on the fire insurance value of properties, to fund the construction of lava barriers on the Reykjanes Peninsula and safeguard local infrastructure from potential volcanic eruptions. The temporary tax, which is intended to last for three years, came into effect on 1 January 2024, and is projected to raise nearly ISK 1 billion (US$8,200,000) annually. The tax is scheduled to expire on 31 December 2026. The total cost for all defence barriers amounts to ISK 10–11 billion (US$82,000,000–90,000,000). Approximately 14 km (8.7 mi) of defence barriers have been constructed to date, using around 3 million m^{3} (110 million cu ft) of excavated material.

== Injuries and fatality ==
On 10 January 2024, just before the second eruption, a worker went missing while finalising the filling of Grindavík's largest fault, after the ground suddenly collapsed midway down the fissure, dragging the top fill and the worker into its depths. At the time of this incident, there were no witnesses present. A colleague, finding no one upon return, reported the disappearance, initiating a search. Despite utilising 3D scanners and underwater drones in the fissure, which is 40 m (130 ft) deep with water found at 20 m (66 ft), the worker was not located due to the fissure's treacherous confines. The search, which included up to 70 rescue workers from the Icelandic Association for Search and Rescue, was terminated on 12 January due to the hazardous conditions. Following the search, The Administration of Occupational Safety and Health opened an investigation into the incident, which spanned several months. With the individual presumed deceased, this incident represents the first death in Iceland associated with a volcanic eruption since the Heimaey eruption in 1973.

On 20 March 2024, an incident at the Blue Lagoon resulted in an employee suffering from gas poisoning, attributed to a substantial release of sulfur dioxide from the March–May 2024 eruption, which was about 3 km (1.9 mi) from the geothermal spa. Despite security personnel being equipped with portable gas meters and the existence of several fixed gas meters across the hot springs area, the specific area where the incident occurred lacked proper monitoring. The affected employee required hospitalisation but eventually made a full recovery. The incident prompted the Blue Lagoon management to undertake a comprehensive reassessment of the site's safety measures. In response to the situation, police were dispatched to inspect the facility.

On the night of 23 August 2024, shortly after midnight, a hiker who had walked from Route 41 (Reykjanesbraut) to the eruption site fell into a small crack and broke his leg. He was later rescued by emergency personnel. Despite previous warnings from authorities emphasising the dangers of walking in the area at night, many individuals—often tourists arriving from Keflavík Airport—continued to attempt the trek. Authorities had warned that navigating the area in complete darkness or bad weather conditions is "extremely difficult and dangerous" due to numerous rifts that are hard to detect. Additionally, part of the area is an old bomb practice site, containing numerous unexploded ordnance. In the immediate aftermath of the incident, authorities continued to patrol the area to prevent further injuries or even potential fatalities.

== International media coverage and tourism ==
The recent volcanic eruptions on the Reykjanes Peninsula created a negative impact on tourism in Iceland due to misleading news coverage by foreign media. Foreign media outlets focused on the state of emergency declared in Grindavík, which gave the impression that the entire country was unsafe. This led to cancellations and a decrease in new bookings and prompted Business Iceland to correct misconceptions and promote Iceland as a safe and unique destination, producing a Q&A video in collaboration with the Icelandic Meteorological Office (IMO), and launching a marketing campaign in December 2023. Furthermore, during her tenure as Minister of Culture and Business Affairs, Lilja Alfreðsdóttir allocated ISK 100 million (US$820,000) to a special marketing campaign. Lína Petra Þórarinsdóttir, Head of Tourism at Business Iceland, believes that the negative impact of the volcanic eruptions can be turned into a positive in the long term, with Iceland being promoted as a unique destination with a special natural environment.

Birgir Jónsson, CEO of now-defunct Play Airlines at the time, claimed that extensive international media coverage of the volcanic eruptions in Grindavík caused substantial financial damage to Icelandic tourism, costing billions of krónas (tens of millions of dollars), in lost revenue. He voiced concerns over the exaggerated portrayal by some foreign news outlets, using imagined headlines such as "Iceland on fire" and "Poison gas over Reykjavík" to illustrate how such depictions contribute to portraying an unnecessarily alarming image of Iceland. Although some international reports warned of toxic gas moving toward the Capital Region, later analyses confirmed the eruption's emissions posed no significant toxic risk to the area. A tourist orientated article inaccurately depicted Grindavík as a ghost town, even though hundreds of people commute to the town daily for work and tourists continue to visit. Since November 2023, the Blue Lagoon has also faced challenges similar to those of Play Airlines, incurring losses of ISK 7–8 billion (US$57,000,000–65,000,000) due to frequent closures.

Jóhannes Þór Skúlason, managing director of the Icelandic Travel Industry Association, said the earthquakes and volcanic eruptions on the Reykjanes Peninsula negatively impacted tourist traffic during the holidays. This led to a decrease in visitors over Christmas and New Year after the coverage led people both to call off trips to Iceland and lower-than-expected demand in January and February 2024 compared to 2023. According to figures by Statistics Iceland, registered guest nights in January 2024 were 13% fewer than in January 2023, or 390,000 instead of 450,000. Bjarnheiður Hallsdóttir, chairman of the same association, attributed the decline in part to the changed attitude towards travelling to Iceland, including the media coverage of the earthquakes in Grindavík.

== Reactions ==
In a televised address following the 14 January 2024 eruption, then-President Guðni Th. Jóhannesson said that "a daunting period of upheaval has begun on the Reykjanes Peninsula", but urged the need to continue taking "actions that are within our power", while "hope for as good an outcome as possible". He also urged citizens to "stand together and have compassion" for those displaced by the eruption. Then-Prime Minister Katrín Jakobsdóttir said the eruption was a "black day for all of Iceland", but added that "the sun will rise again", and expressed solidarity with those affected.

== See also ==
- Geology of Reykjanes Peninsula
- List of earthquakes in 2023
- List of earthquakes in Iceland
- List of volcanic eruptions in Iceland
