= Sveifluháls =

Mountain ridge in Iceland

- Austurháls
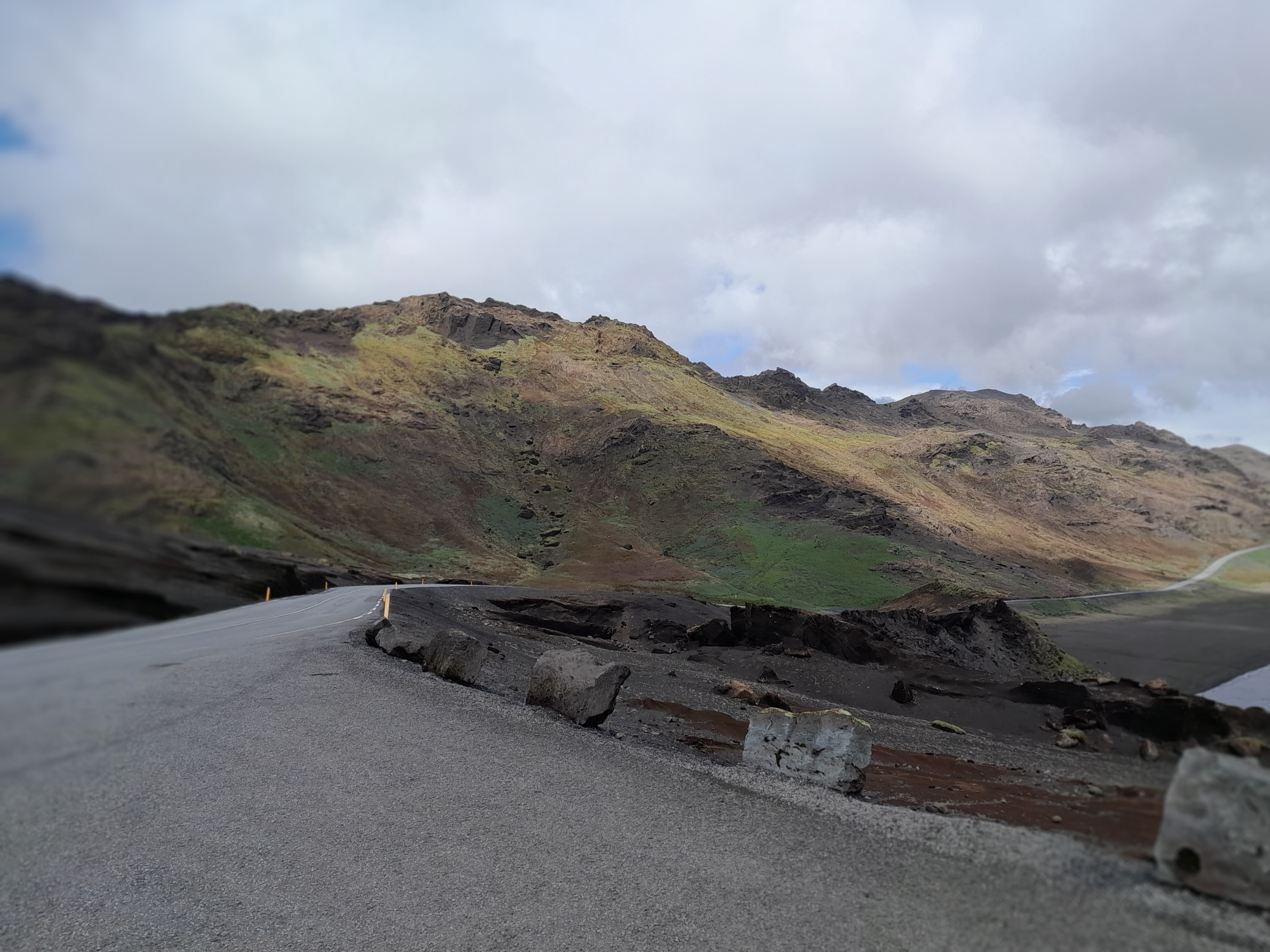
- Sveifluháls seen from Krýsuvíkurvegur.

Highest point
- Elevation: 397 m (1,302 ft)
- Coordinates: 63°52′03″N 22°05′22″W

Geography
- Location within Iceland
- Location: Reykjanes Peninsula, Iceland

Geology
- Mountain type(s): hyaloclastite ridge, tindar complex
- Volcanic belt: Reykjanes Volcanic Belt
- Last eruption: Pleistocene

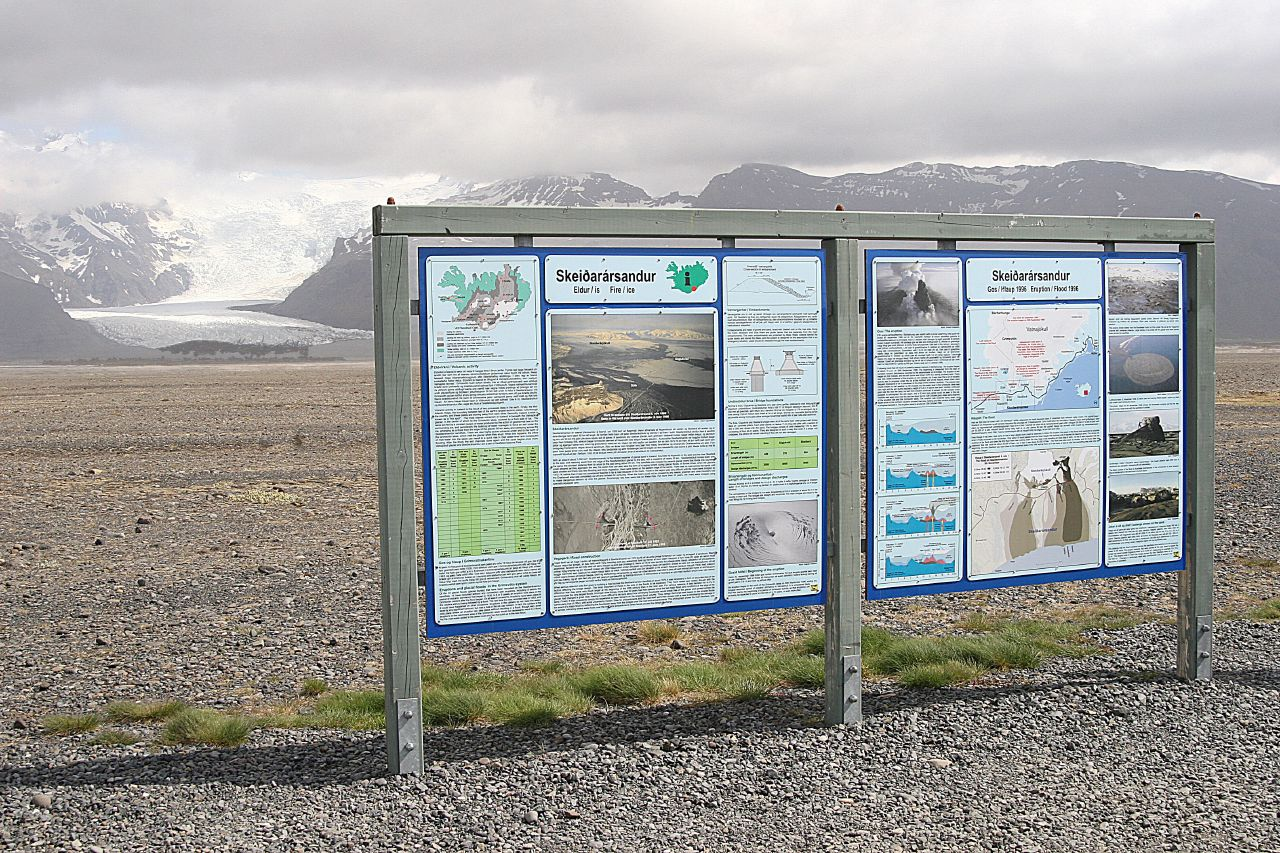
Probably produced by a similar type of eruption: Memorial of jökulhlaup over Skeiðarársandur following the Grímsvötn-Gjálp eruption in 1996

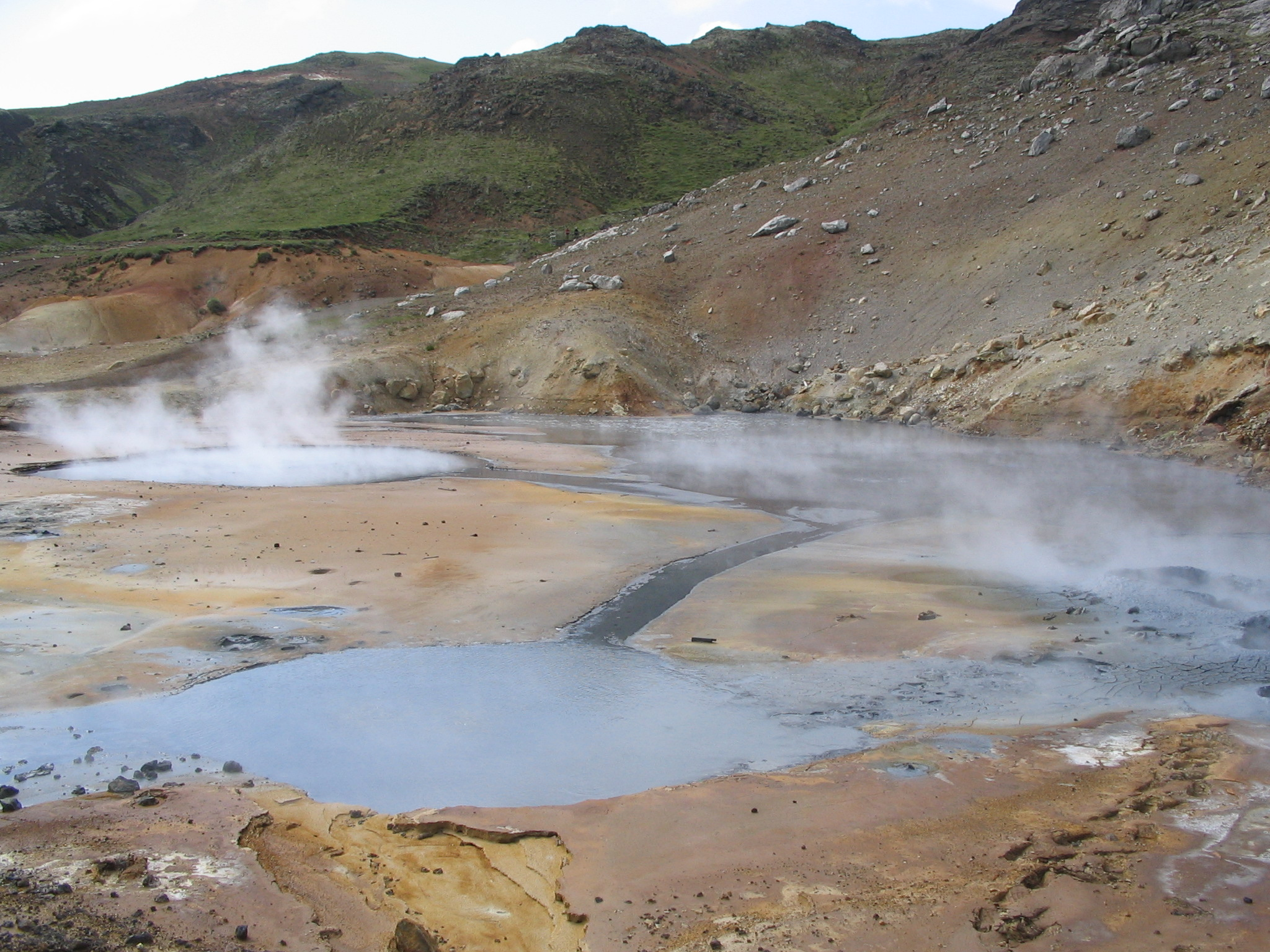
Sveifluháls from Seltún geothermal area

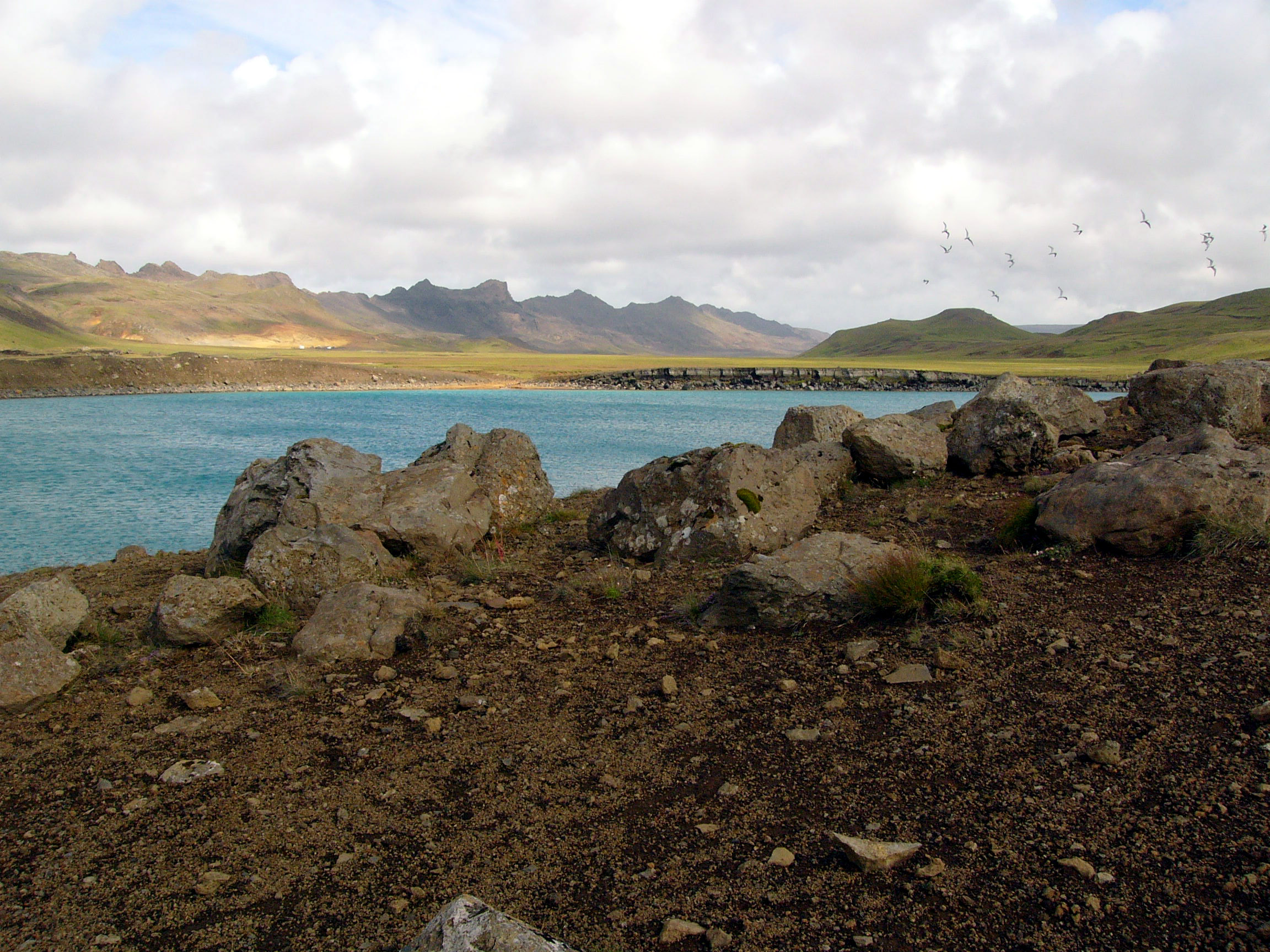
Sveifluháls seen from Grænavatn maar

Sveifluháls (Icelandic pronunciation: [ˈsveiplʏˌhauls]) is a mafic hyaloclastite ridge of 397 m height in the southwest of Iceland in Gullbringusýsla (Reykjanes Peninsula). It is part of Krýsuvík volcanic system and of the protected area Reykjanes Fólkvangur.

== Geography ==
The mountain is situated between lake Kleifarvatn and the valley Móhálsadalur [ˈmouːˌhaulsaˌtaːlʏr̥]. In some parts of the ridge, there are geothermal areas, esp. at Krýsuvík and Seltún. It is located at about 5 km from the southern coast of Reykjanes Peninsula.

The ridge actually consists of two parallel narrow ridge segments with a 0,5 km wide valley in between.

Sveifluháls is also called Austurháls [ˈœystʏrˌhauls] in contrast to its parallel ridge on the other side of Móhálsadalur, the Núpshlídarháls [ˈnupsˌl̥iːðarˌhauls] ridge, which is also called Vesturháls [ˈvɛstʏrˌhauls].

Road 42 passes by directly at the foot of the mountain between the same and lake Kleifarvatn.

== Geology ==
Sveifluháls is a basaltic hyaloclastite ridge, actually a "ca. 22 km long tindar complex". It consists as is usual for such subglacially formed volcanoes, of pillow lavas under a layer of phreatomagmatic tephra (hyaloclastite). Pedersen and her coworkers think that the Ice Age glacier which was covering it at time of formation had a thickness between 70 and 400 m.

=== Formation of Sveifluháls ===
Mercurio postulates that the ridge formation started with eruptions under a 450–600 m thick ice sheet between 42,000–12,400 years BP. The melting of glacier ice induced the formation of one or more subglacial meltwater lakes. Dropping overburden pressures lead to the eruption of vitric phreatomagmatic tuff. Over time this tuff accumulated and formed circular tuff cones, elongated tuff cones and ridges, volcanic edifices that were arranged "along 60 semi-parallel individual linear segments" (i.e. eruption fissures – in this case subglacial ones) "that vary in length between 0,25 and 1,5 km."

In the following time, these edifices grew and developed further by subaqueous density currents and resuspense resp. settling of the tuff within the meltwater lakes. This was facilitated by over steepening or retreat of the ice walls around the growing volcano. Igneous Intrusions into the piles of tuff also helped destabilizing them.

The tuff cones and ridges grew and merged, but they also enclosed a source of jökulhlaup in between them, inter-ridge meltwater catchments with volumes of up to 15,000,000 m³. In the whole, the eruptions of Sveifluháls may have produced 17.25 km³ of meltwater and a DRE of 2,0 km³. In the end, the meltwater lakes drained and at least one of the eruption centers produced subaerial lava, which means that there is a tuya component in the ridge, not all of it was produced by subglacial eruptions.

The eruption in the whole was probably similar to the Gjálp eruption within the Grímsvötn Volcanic System in 1996.

=== Geothermal activity at Sveifluháls ===
Especially in two areas, geothermal activity at Sveifluháls is intense and connected to Krysuvík volcanic system. These are Seltún on the one hand, and the hills behind the farm and school of Krýsuvík on the other hand (so called Hveradalir [ˈkʰvɛːraˌtaːlɪr̥]). Hot ground, fumaroles, hot springs and mud pots are to be found there. Measurements in Seltún even show a thermal output of about 4 MW. Hydrothermal alteration and this heat lead to precipitation of minerals like hematite, goethite and different sulfur compounds.

== Hiking ==
Many hiking trails lead up on Sveifluháls or are to be found in the vicinity. For example, there are trails up from Seltún at the southern end of the ridge to Arnarvatn [ˈa(r)tnarˌvahtn̥] and from there into the Móhálsadalur [ˈmouːˌhaulsaˌtaːlʏr̥], or for hiking a round to Hetta [ˈhɛhta], one of the southernmost summits of the long Sveifluháls ridge.

There is also the possibility to hike from Vatnsskarð (Reykjanes) [ˈvasːˌskarθ] up on Sveifluháls and follow the ridge to the highest summit Stapatindur [ˈstaːpaˌtʰɪntʏr̥].

== See also ==
- Krýsuvík (volcanic system)
- Geology of Reykjanes Peninsula
- Subglacial volcano
