= Krýsuvík (volcanic system) =

Volcanic region in Iceland

Coordinates: 63°55′48″N 22°06′00″W

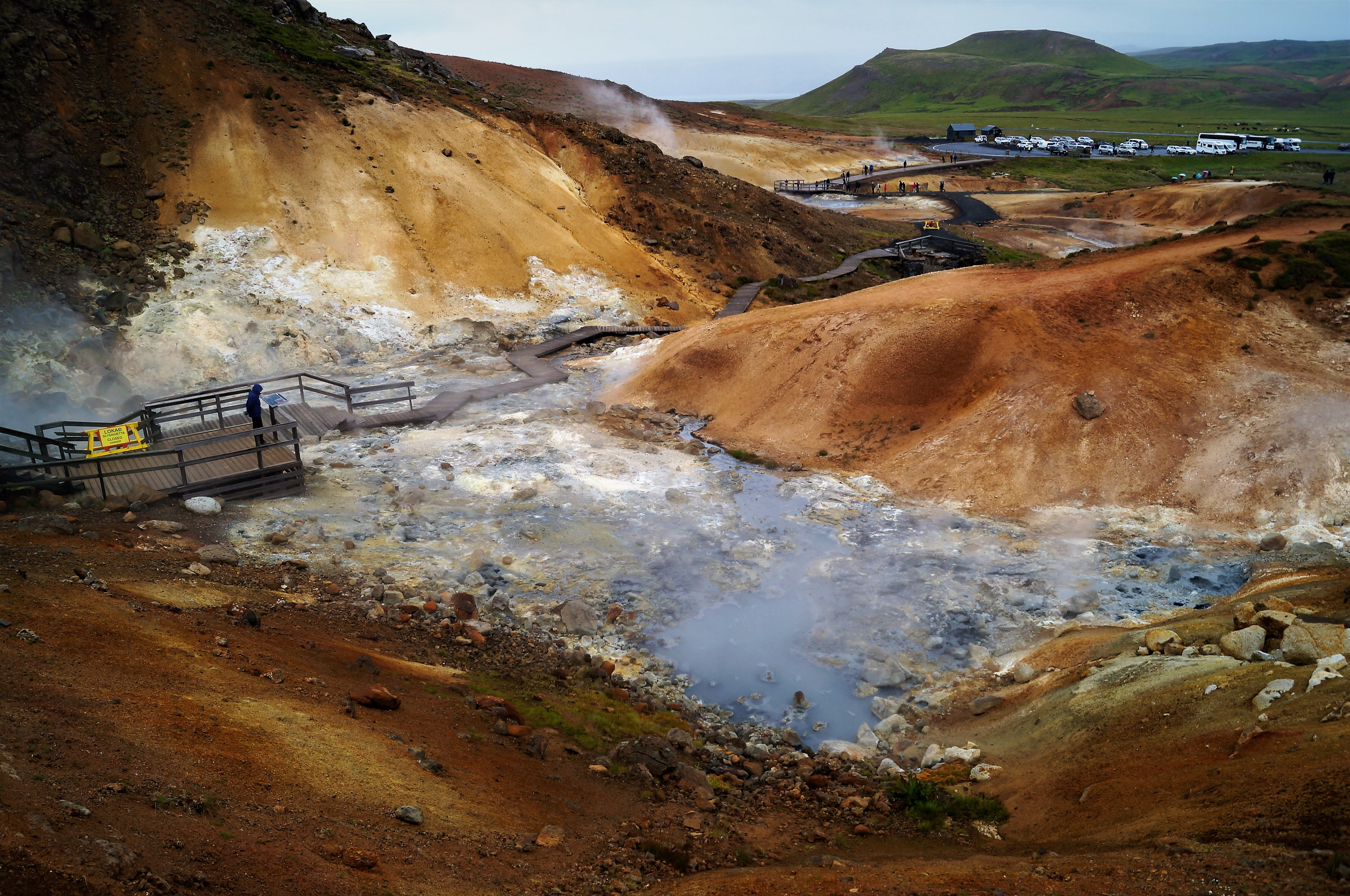
Seltún geothermal field within Krýsuvík volcanic system

Selected geological features near the Krýsuvík volcanic system (approximate outline in red).
Legend
- '"`UNIQ--templatestyles-00000003-QINU`"'
  Krýsuvík (volcanic system)
- '"`UNIQ--templatestyles-00000004-QINU`"' fissure swarms
- '"`UNIQ--templatestyles-00000005-QINU`"' central volcanoes
- '"`UNIQ--templatestyles-00000006-QINU`"' calderas
- '"`UNIQ--templatestyles-00000007-QINU`"' subglacial terrain above 1,100 m (3,600 ft)
- '"`UNIQ--templatestyles-00000008-QINU`"' seismically active areas between 1995 to 2007
- Clicking on the rectangle enlarges and enables mouse-over with more detail

Krýsuvík in the south-east of Iceland is related to its other volcanic systems

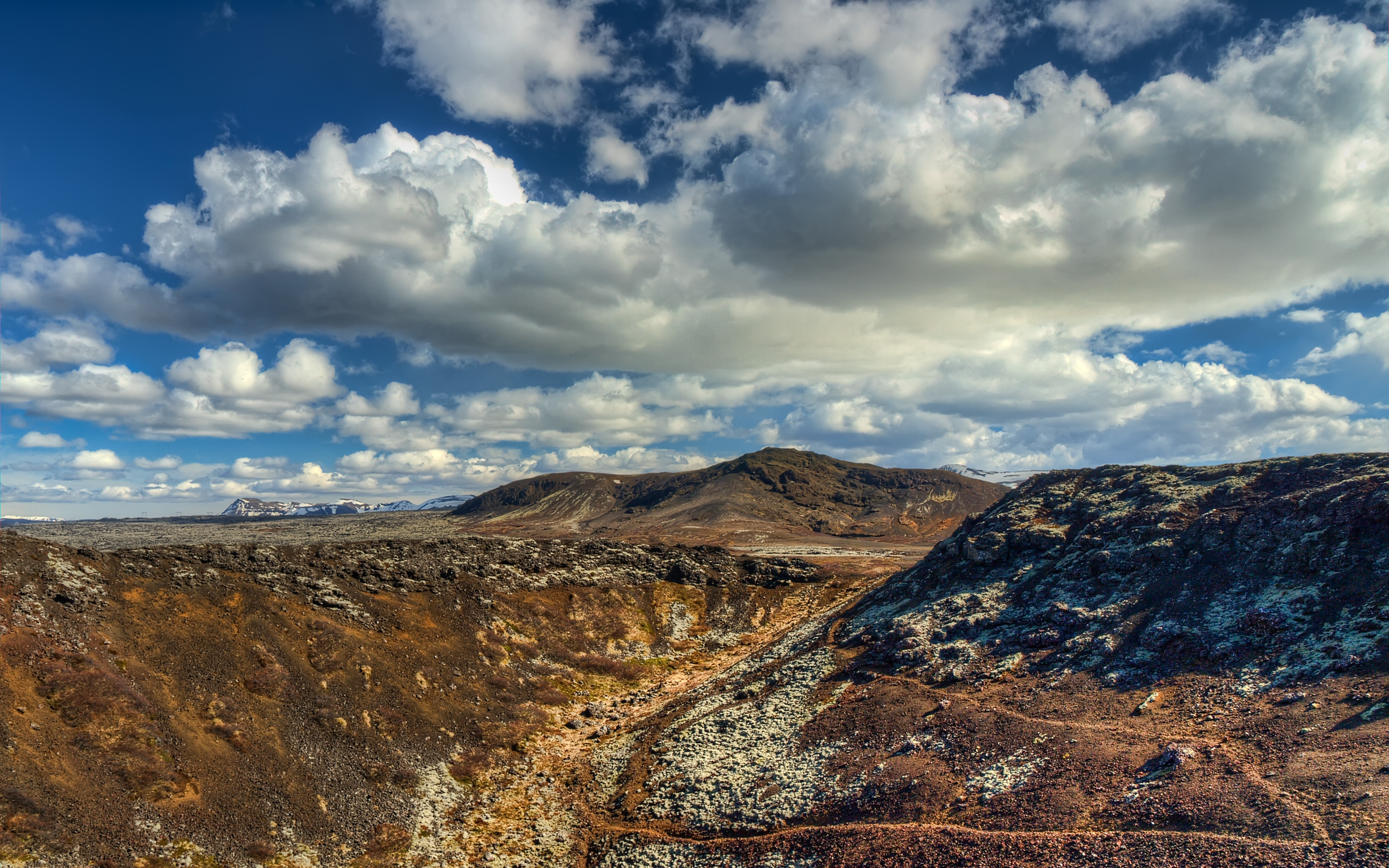
Búrfellsgjá lava channel

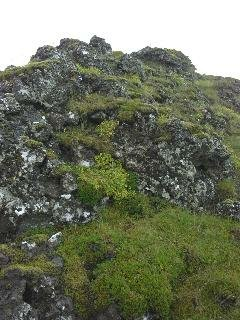
Gálgahraun (Búrfellshraun) ʻaʻā lava, Álftanes

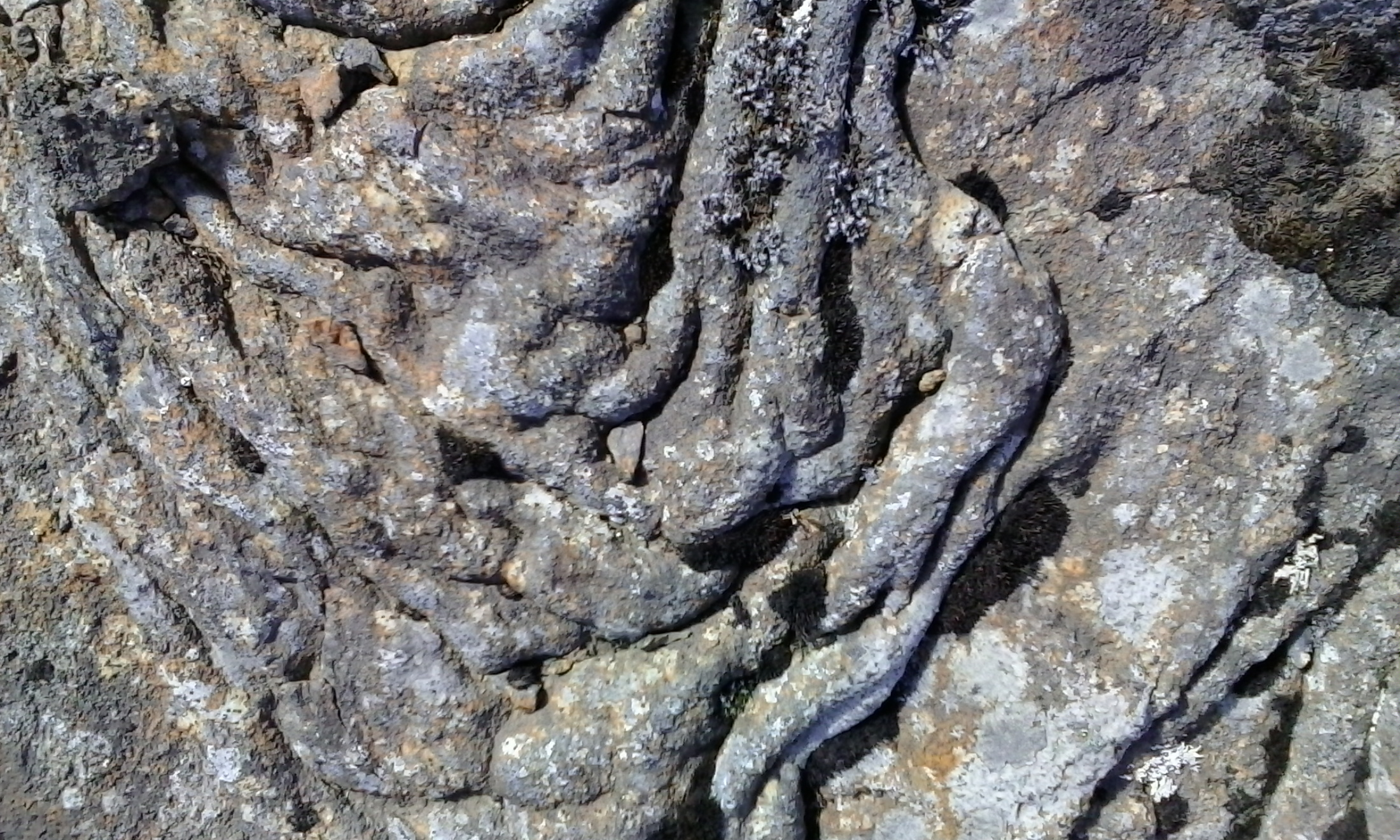
Pahoehoe lava in Kapelluhraun lava field, Hafnarfjörður

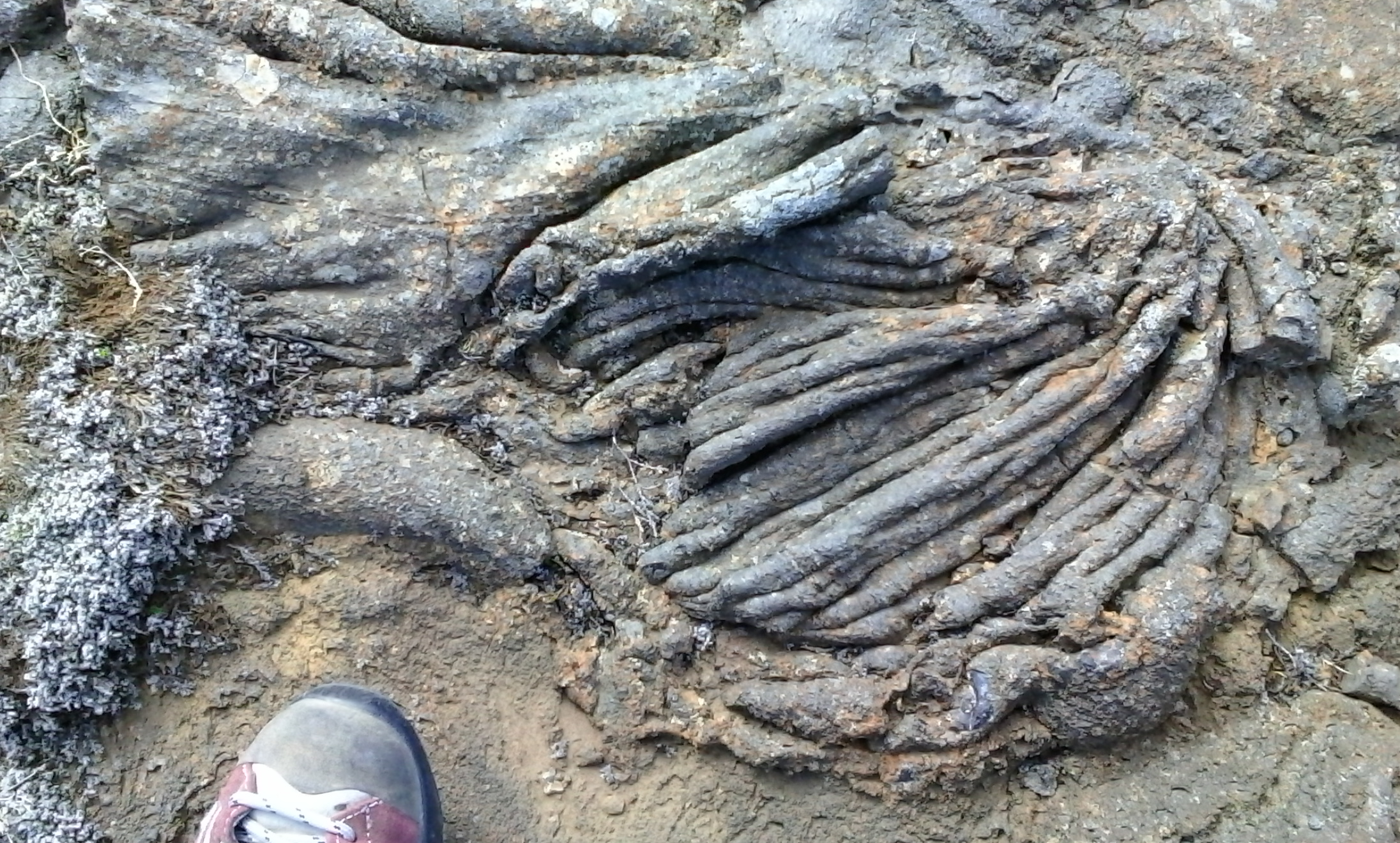
Another ropy pahoehoe formation in Kapelluhraun

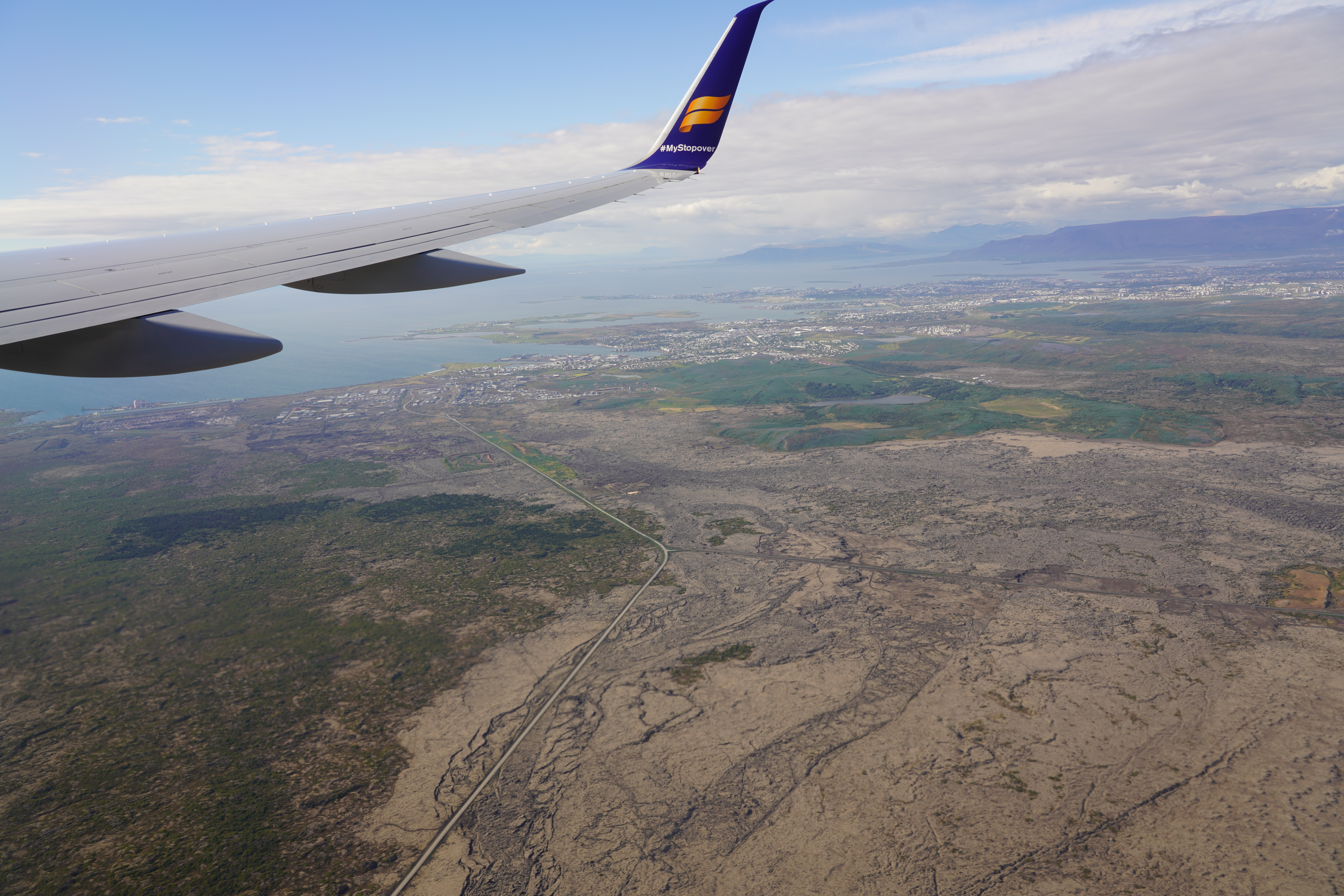
Óbrinnishólabruni lava field from air

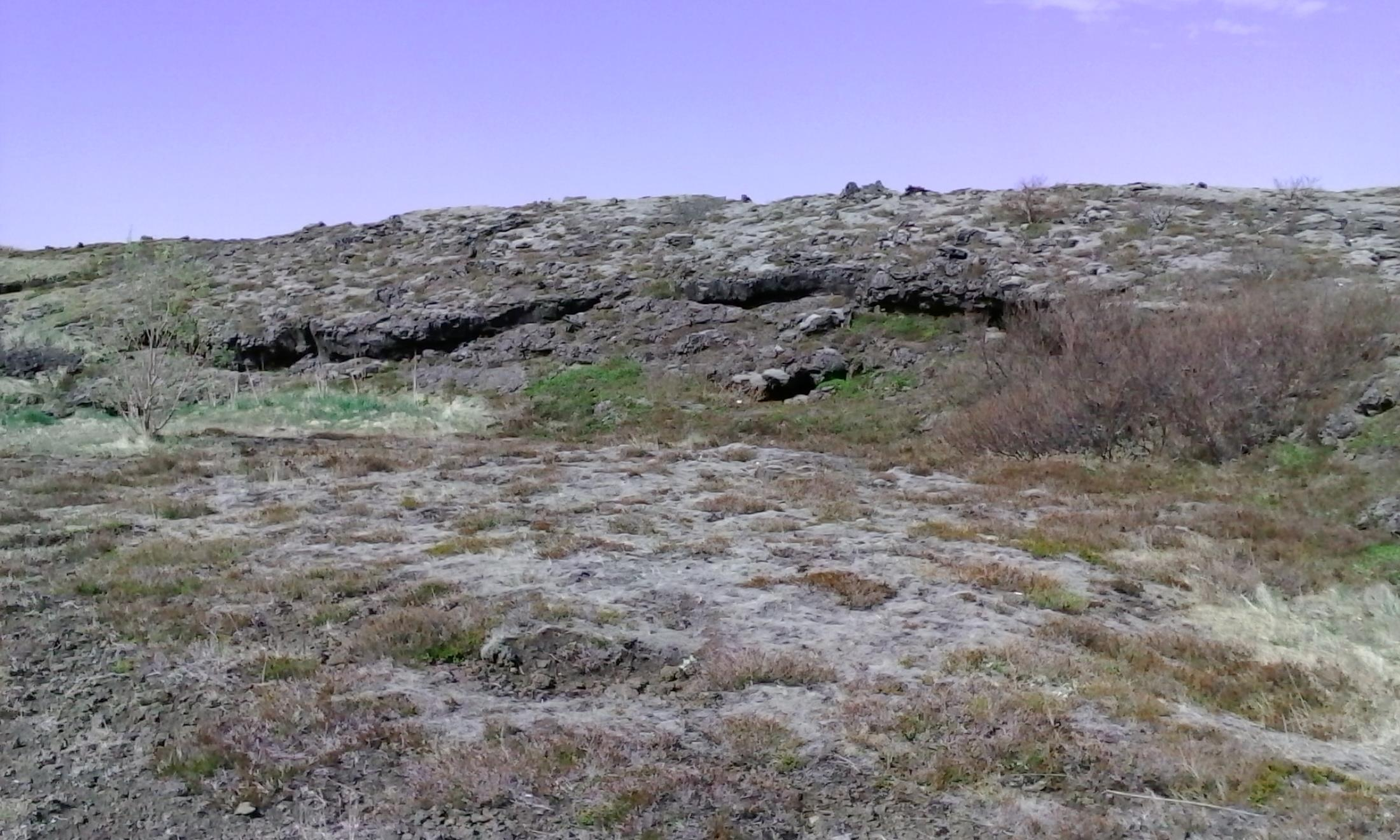
Lava tubes within Kapelluhraun lava field

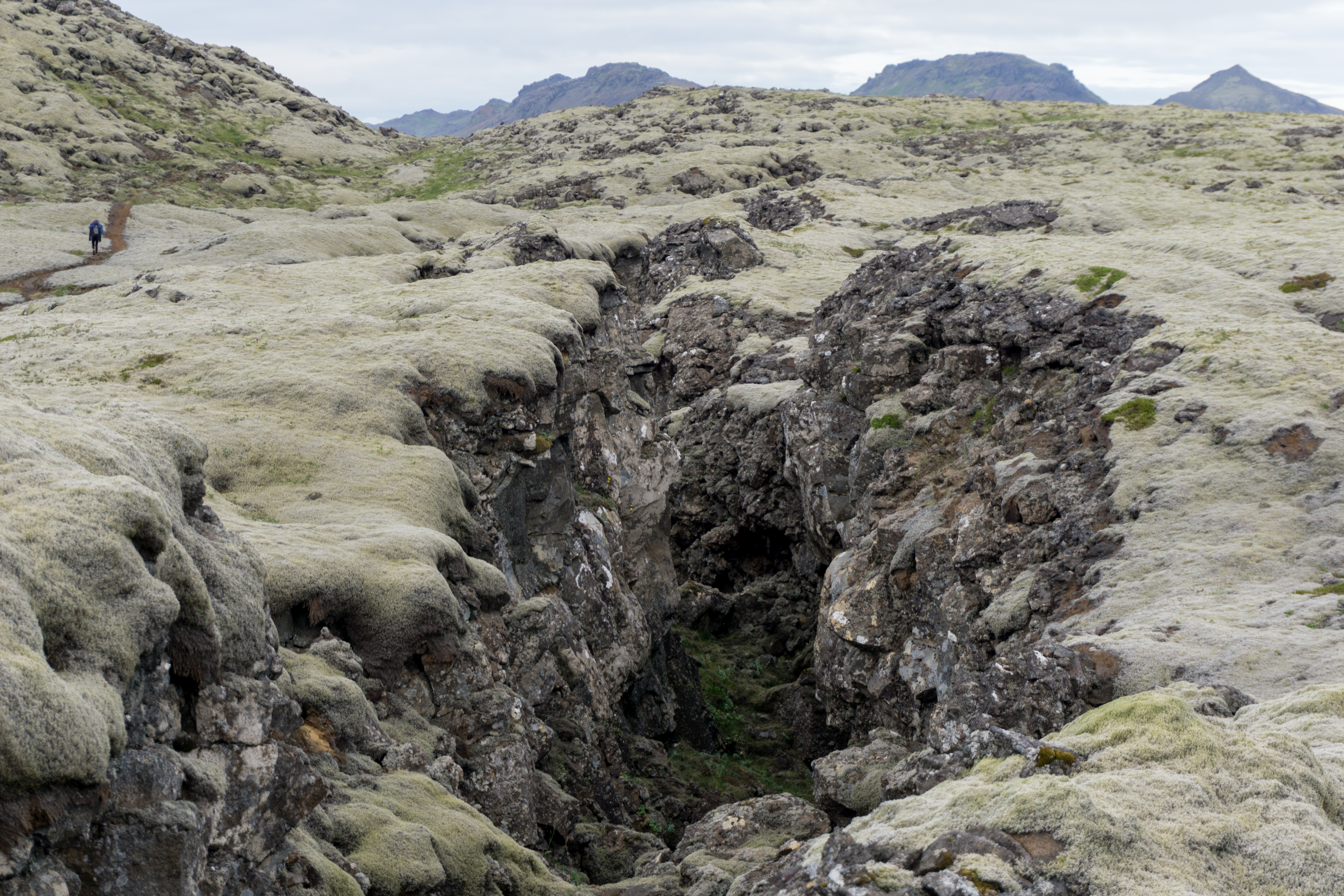
A fissure in Krýsuvík lavas, Trölladyngja (Reykjanes) behind

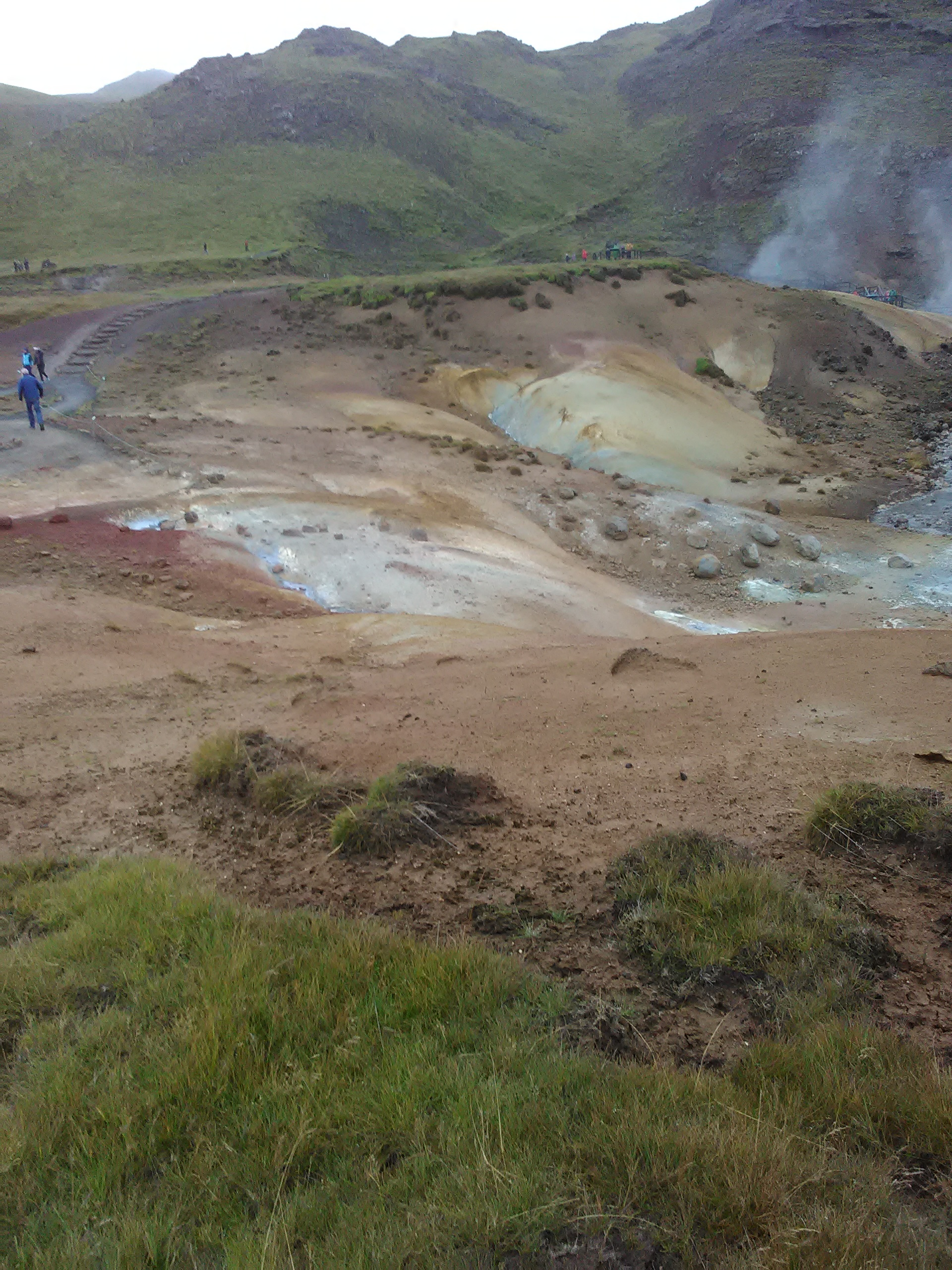
Volcanic degassing and hydrothermal alteration at Seltún in 2019

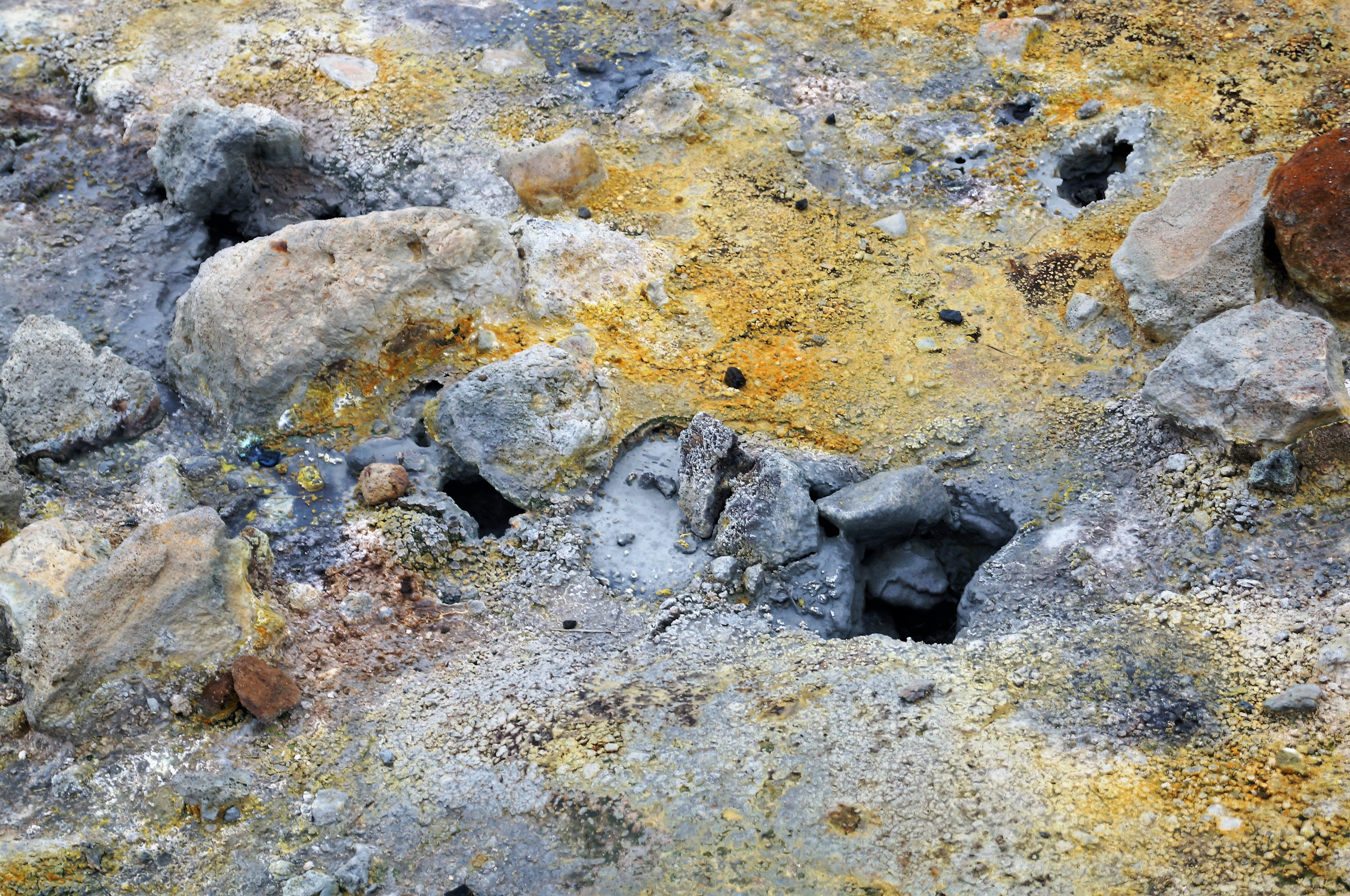
Vents and sulfur compounds at Seltún

The volcanic system of Krýsuvík (or Krísuvík, both pronounced [ˈkʰriːsʏˌviːk] in Icelandic, also Trölladyngja-Krýsuvík or Krýsuvík-Trölladyngja [ˈtʰrœtlaˌtiɲca] volcanic system), is situated in the south–west of Iceland on the Reykjanes peninsula. It is located in the middle of Reykjanes and on the divergent plate boundary of the Mid-Atlantic Ridge which traverses Iceland. It was named after the Krýsuvík area which is part of it and consists of a fissure system without a central volcano. However, there are some indications—namely, the discovery by geophysical methods of what scientists interpret as a buried caldera, combined with the well-known, vigorous hydrothermal system above it—that an embryonic central magma chamber may already exist or be actively developing.

The volcanic system has a length of 55 km (34 mi), a width of around 13 km (8.1 mi), covers an area of 350 km^{2} (140 sq mi), and its highest elevation is 393 m (1,289 ft). It is one of 4 (or up to 7, depending on the source) volcanic systems situated within the Reykjanes Volcanic Belt. The volcanic systems are arranged en echelon and at an angle that varies from 20 to 45° to the direction of the rift zone on the divergent plate boundary traversing Reykjanes.

== General characteristics ==
The volcanic system of Krýsuvík has no central volcanic edifice, but rather a fissure swarm that is 50 km (31 mi) long, is composed of a mixture of volcanic and tectonic fissures and faults, of which 30 km (19 mi) are volcanic fissures. Recent geophysical work on the system, employing magnetotelluric resistivity sampling and modeling, indicates the presence of a buried caldera with possibly an embryonic central magma chamber beneath the system. This suggests that it could eventually develop into a central volcano like the similar, but more mature Hengill volcanic system farther to the east on the peninsula. There are no known submarine fissures of the system which nevertheless reaches from the south coast in direction south–west to north–east over the Reykjanes Peninsula. The northernmost fissures are thought to reach Lake Rauðavatn [ˈrœyːðaˌvahtn̥] on the outskirts of Reykjavík. There are no ice-covered volcanoes connected to the Krýsuvík system, but Lake Kleifarvatn lies within the system and geothermal activity is found at the lake bottom.

The Krýsuvík volcanic system has a tendency to effusive basaltic fissure eruptions; the last eruption took place in the 14th century. The Fagradalsfjall fissure swarm that erupted in 2021 was initially considered potentially a branch or a secondary part of the Krýsuvík volcanic system, but it is now usually considered a separate volcanic system. The eruption products of the Krýsuvík system consist exclusively of basalt.

== Eruptions ==
The volcanic system is centered on the divergent plate boundary on Reykjanes peninsula. It is easier there for magma to reach the surface, because of the multitude of tectonic and volcanic faults and fissures in such regions. There have been at least 10 volcanic episodes within the volcanic system in the last 8,000 years. These episodes each comprised many single eruptions and were most probably connected to rifting.

Some Holocene eruptions have been dated specifically, especially the eruption that produced Búrfellshraun (ca. 5290 BP). Since the time of settlement in Iceland, which is thought to have been in the 9th century, more eruptions have taken place within the system, all of them in the Middle Ages.

The Krýsuvík fires were a period of volcanic activity which started in the middle of the 12th century, probably in 1151 and written sources indicate that they ended in 1188. The activity of Pleistocene shield volcanoes such as Þráinskjöldur [ˈθrauːɪnˌscœltʏr̥] and Hrútagjá [ˈr̥uːtaˌcauː], as well as of tuyas like Fagradalsfjall within the volcanic system, are seen as separate from the fissure system, although the bigger volcanoes control parts of the topography.

The Krýsuvík system has a tendency to phreatic explosions, often within rifting episodes or during eruption series. The underground of Reykjanes peninsula is soaked with water as it has a high groundwater level as well as saline sea water in its cave systems. There is a prehistoric maar complex around Grænavatn at Krýsuvík which has its origin in phreatic explosions connected to a period of effusive eruptions. There an explosion connected to geothermal activity of an old borehole in 1999 at Seltún.

Starting on 27 September 2021, an intense earthquake swarm began that was concentrated around the Keilir region with over 1000 earthquakes with a magnitude 4.2 event on 2 October. The earthquakes sparked concern that a second eruption could begin in the area but it was not known definitely what was causing the swarm. During the overnight hours of 10 October 2021, a strong M3.2 earthquake occurred 2 km (1.2 mi) SSW of Keilier.

From about July 2020 until autumn 2023 there was upward vertical ground motion in the Krýsuvík area and after this the ground started subsiding. This may be associated with magma movement underground.

== List of lava fields ==
These are some lava fields which originated in eruptions of the Krýsuvík volcanic system since the end of the last glacial spell 13,000 years ago.

=== Búrfellshraun ===
Around 8,000 years ago, the Búrfell crater near Hafnarfjörður produced a 18 km^{2} (6.9 sq mi) lava field called Búrfellshraun [ˈpurˌfɛlsˌr̥œyːn]. Today, a big part of midtown Hafnarfjörður is built onto and around Búrfellshraun. The crater contains a lava channel called Búrfellsgjá [ˈpurˌfɛlsˌcauː].

=== Óbrinnishólabruni ===
The Óbrinnishólabruni [ˈouːˌprɪnːɪsˌhouːlaˌprʏːnɪ] lavas came 2,000 years ago from some craters near Bláfjallavegur [ˈplauːˌfjatlaˌvɛːɣʏr̥] (Road 407) which have since been destroyed by quarrying. The name Óbrinnishólar [ˈouːˌprɪnːɪsˌhouːlar̥] means that there was no “fire” in them during further eruptions in the region in historical time. Parts of Hafnarfjörður (midtown and Vallahverfi [ˈvatlaˌkʰvɛrvɪ]) are located on top of this lava field.

=== Kapelluhraun ===
The lavas of Kapelluhraun ([ˈkʰaːpɛtlʏˌr̥œyːn], "chapel lava") from historical time (erupted around 1150) have been given this name because of a medieval chapel whose ruins are still standing on them. A small statue of Saint Barbara was found at the place. The Kapelluhraun lava field consists of pāhoehoe and ʻaʻā lava which streamed from the highland down to the bay of Straumsvík near today's aluminium smelter and there into the sea. The events were part of a ca. 30 years long unrest period in the late 12th century which is called Krýsuvík Fires. This unrest period included repeated eruption series and rifting episodes and is recorded in Flateyjarbók.

The eruption fissures had a length of 10 km (6.2 mi) and 6.5 km (4.0 mi) respectively, and the lava flows cover around 36 km^{2} (14 sq mi). Today it is a golf course is situated in the middle of these lavas, seen when looking from Route 41 between Straumsvík and Hafnarfjörður in direction of Faxaflói.

== Landforms ==
The Seltún [ˈsɛlˌtʰuːn] geothermal area is situated next to Krýsuvík in direction of lake Kleifarvatn (Route 42) and at the foot of Sveifluháls hyaloclastite ridge. It is a geothermal high temperature area, hydrothermal alteration has led to a multicolored environment. Here solfataras, fumaroles, mudpots and hot springs are formed; the soil is coloured bright yellow, red, and green caused by iron oxidation, sulfur and calcite precipitation. The sulfur deposits were mined in 1722–1728 and in the 19th century. The German scientist Robert Bunsen visited the site in 1845 and, based on research there, proposed a hypothesis on formation of sulfuric acid in nature.

Also found in the area are the Ögmundarhraun [ˈœɣˌmʏntar̥ˌr̥œyːn] lava field from the 12th century as well as some Pleistocene subglacial mounds and formations like Helgafell, Sveifluháls and Trölladyngja.

== Geothermal activity ==
Some active geothermal high temperature areas are to be found in the system, especially at Seltún. Since 2009 repeated uplift episodes with earthquake swarms occurred, probably connected to igneous intrusions and hydrothermal changes.

== See also ==
- Brennisteinsfjöll volcanic system
- Geology of Reykjanes Peninsula
- Volcanism of Iceland
  - List of volcanic eruptions in Iceland
  - List of volcanoes in Iceland
