= Krýsuvík fires =

12th century volcanic activity in Iceland

Coordinates: 63.89520°N 22.05606°W

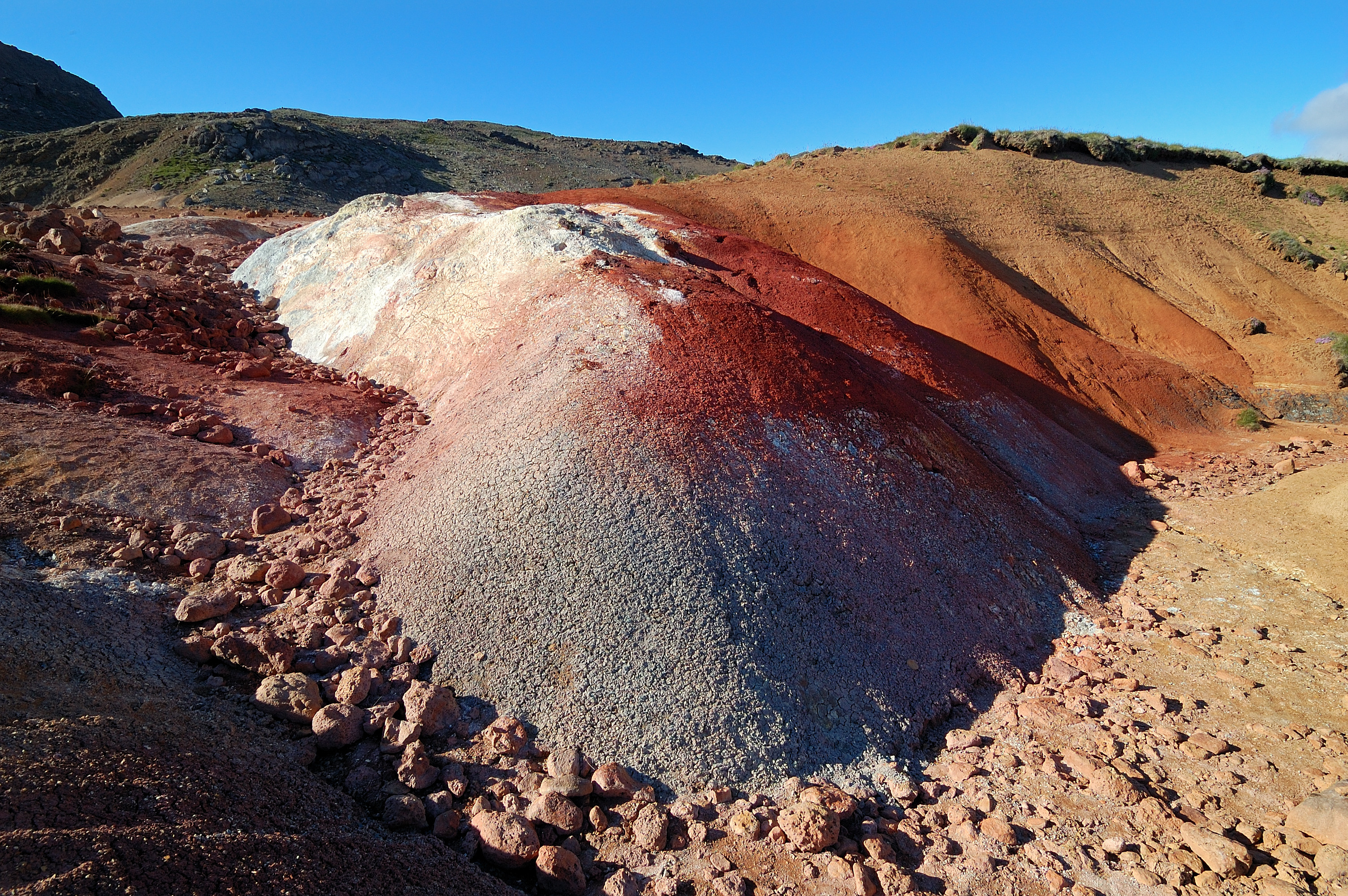
Krýsuvík

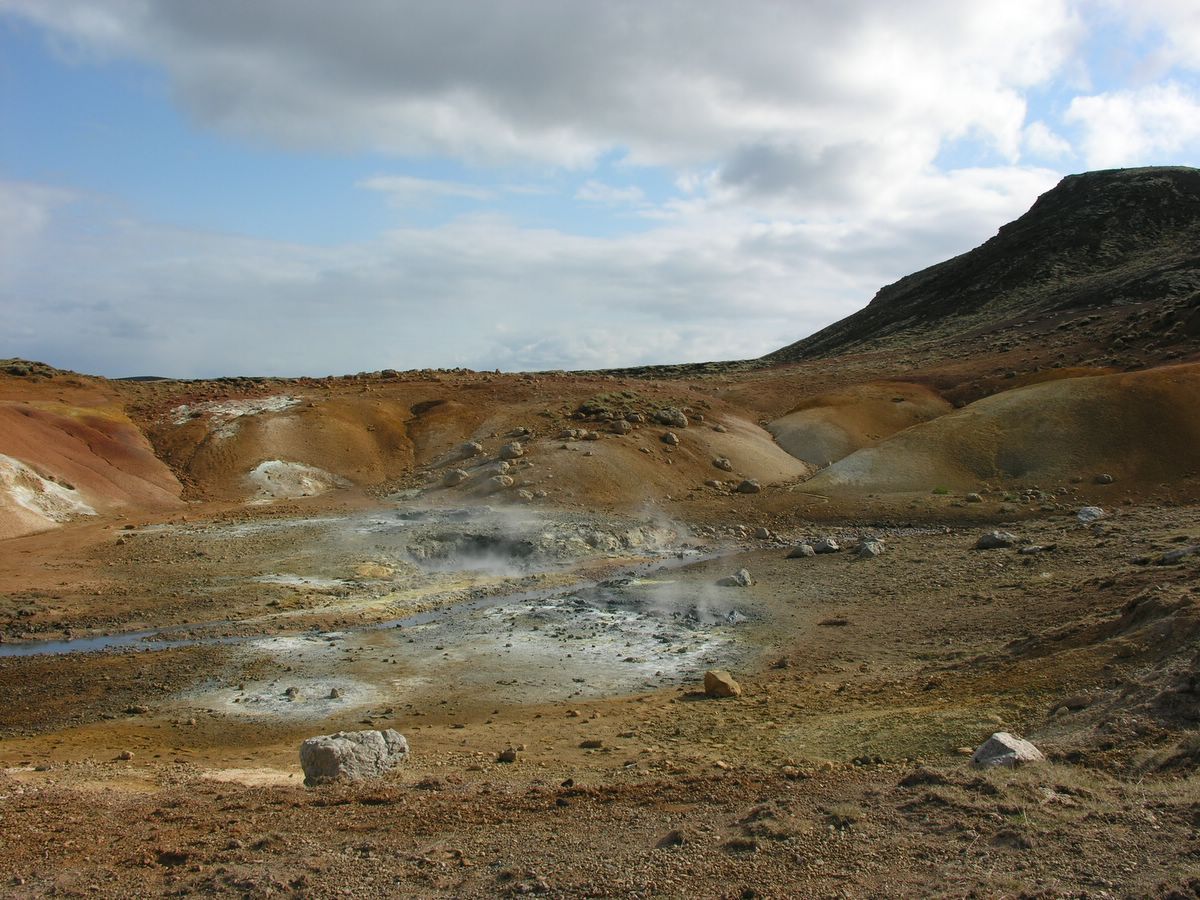
Hverasvæði í Krýsuvík

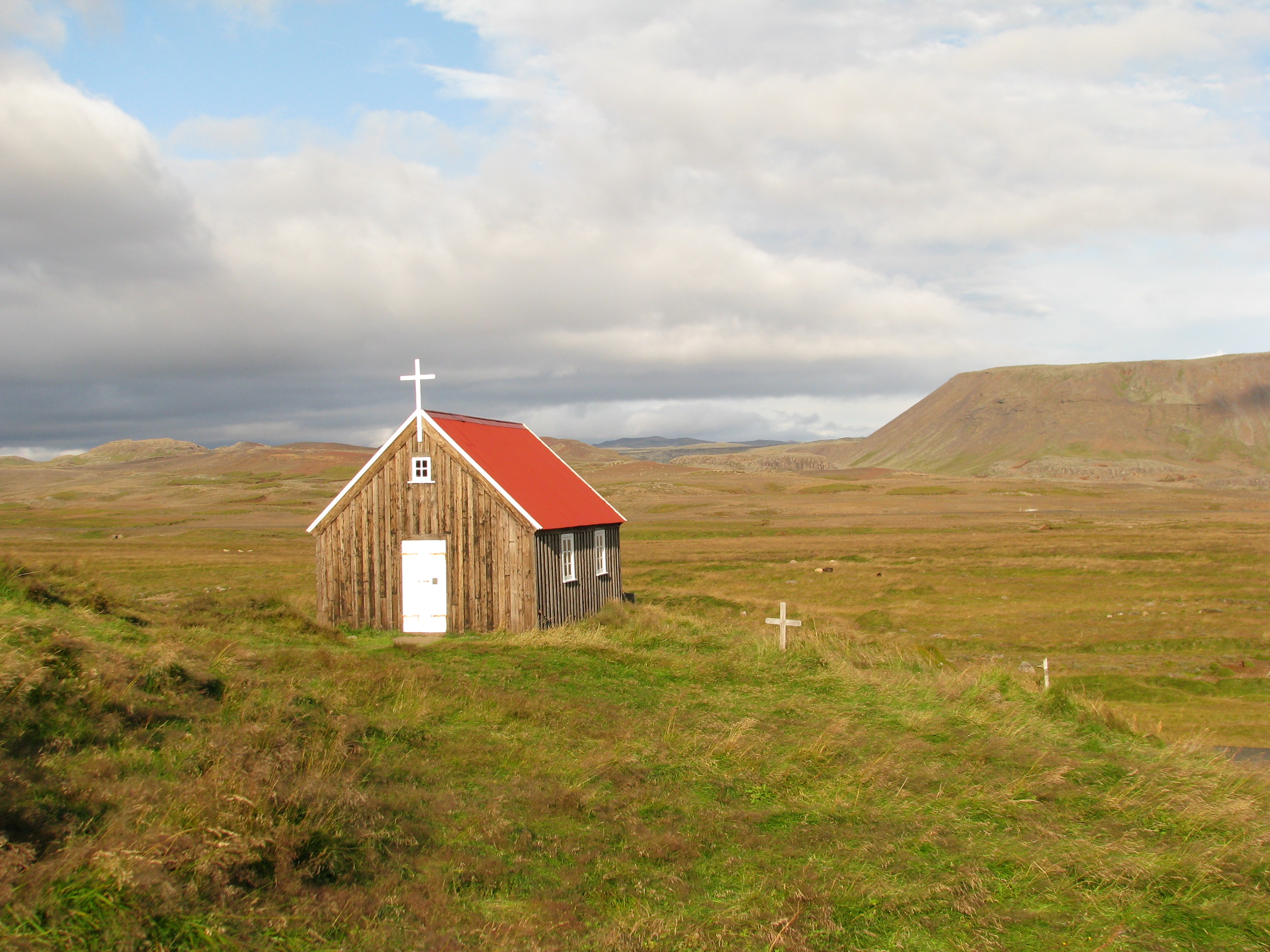
Krýsuvíkurkirkja

The Krýsuvík fires were a period of volcanic activity in a fissure swarm known as Krýsuvík (is: Krýsuvíkureldar) on the Reykjanes peninsula.

The fires started in the middle of the 12th century, probably in 1151 and written sources indicate that they ended in 1188. Lava flows associated with the Krýsuvík fires are Ögmundarhraun, Mávahlíðahraun [ˈmauː(v)aˌl̥iːðaˌr̥œyːn] and Kapelluhraun.

== See also ==
- List of volcanic eruptions on Iceland
- Krýsuvík (volcanic system)
- Volcanism of Iceland
- Geology of Iceland
- List of volcanoes in Iceland
- Geological deformation of Iceland
- Global Volcanism Program
