= Búrfell (Garðabær) =

Mountain in Iceland

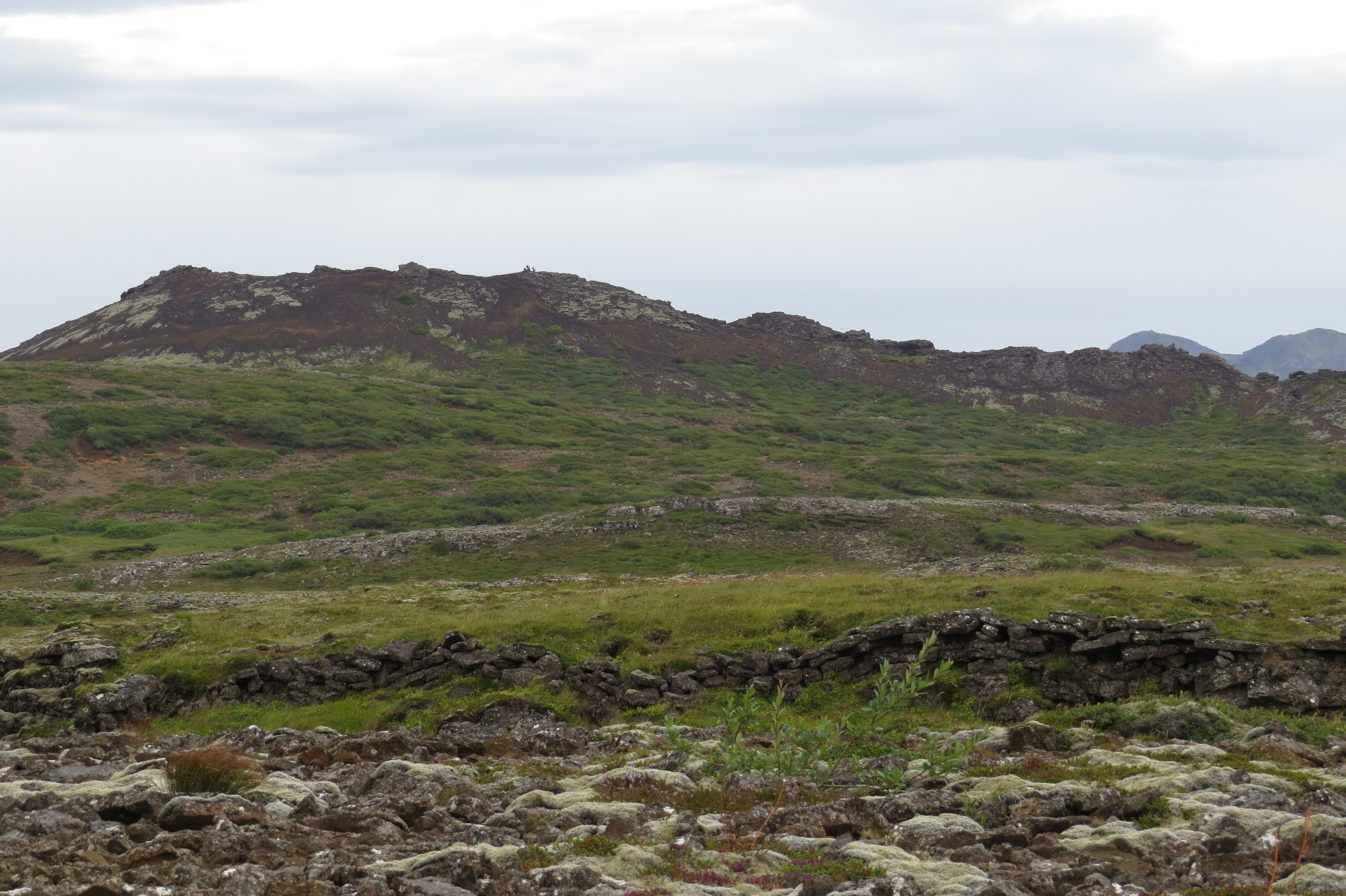

Highest point
- Elevation: 179 m (587 ft)
- Coordinates: 64°02′00″N 21°49′49″W

Naming
- English translation: pantry mountain
- Language of name: Icelandic

Geography
- Location within Iceland
- Location of Búrfell (Garðabær) and its lava flows in the Krýsuvík volcanic system. On zoom out other Icelandic geological features are shown: Legend: Other shading shows: calderas; central volcanoes; fissure swarms; subglacial terrain above 1,100 m (3,600 ft); seismically active areas; Clicking on the rectangle in the image enlarges to full window and enables mouse-over with more detail.
- Location: Iceland

Geology
- Mountain type: Basalt cone

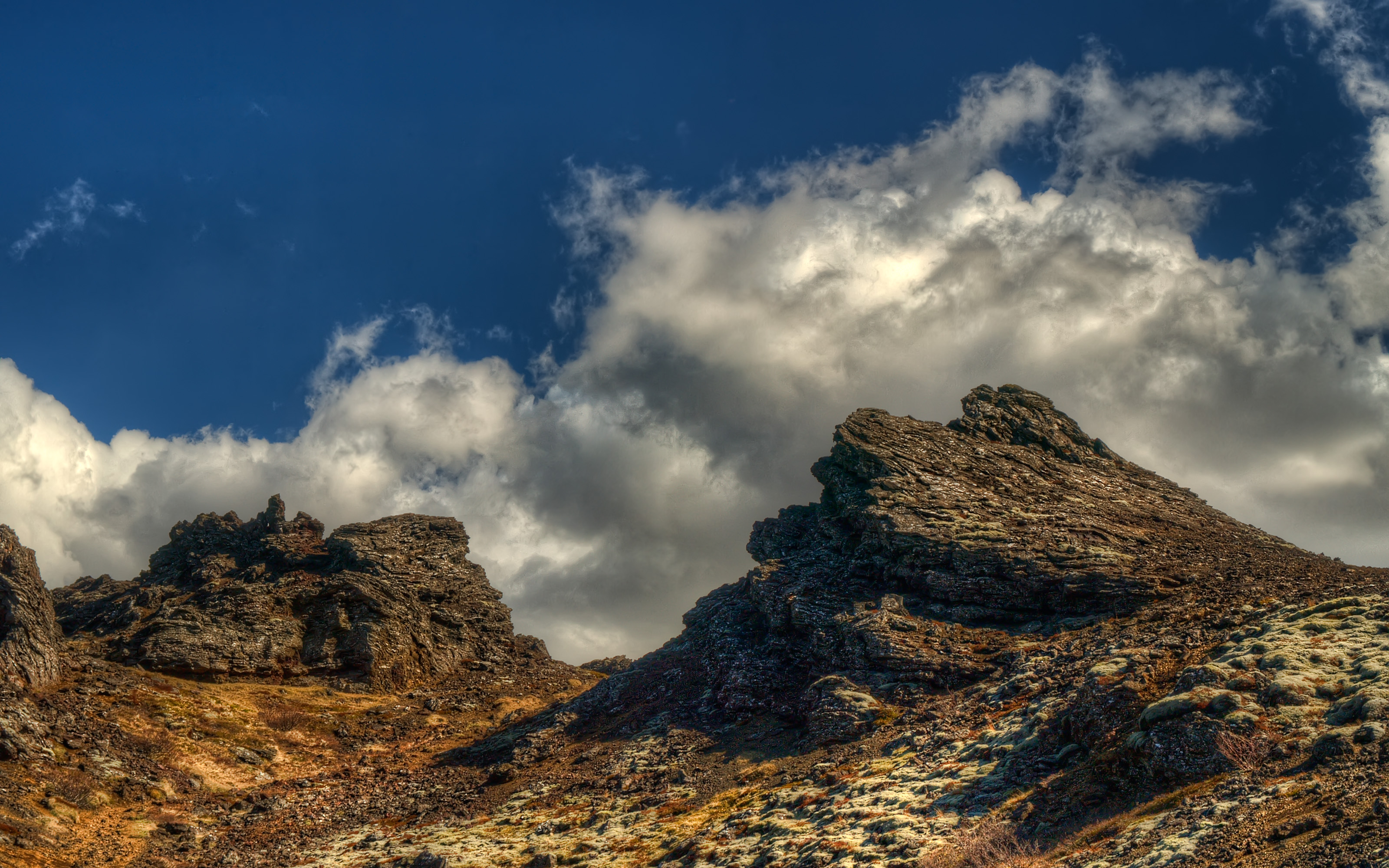
Upper part of Búrfellsgjá

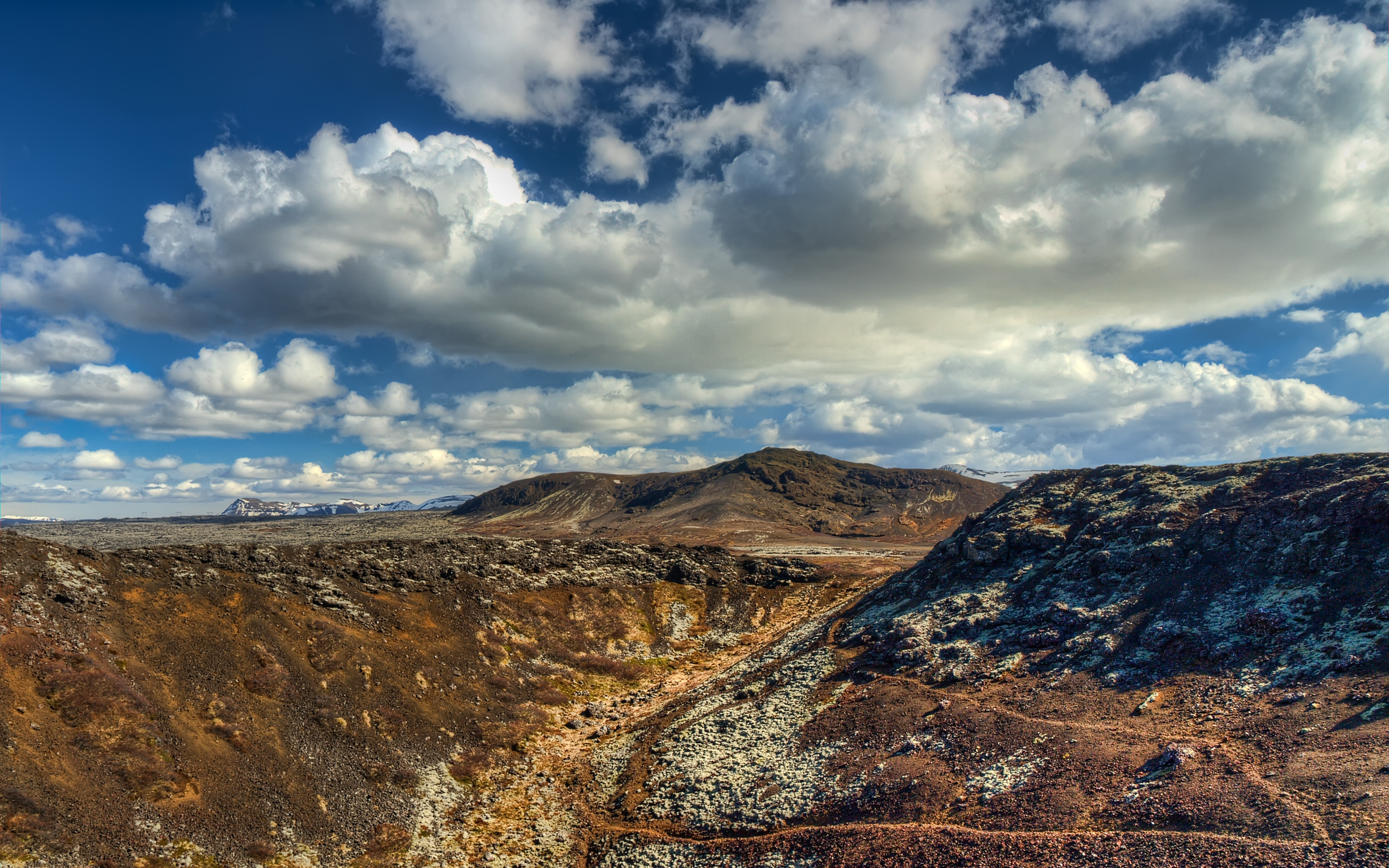
Búrfellsgjá

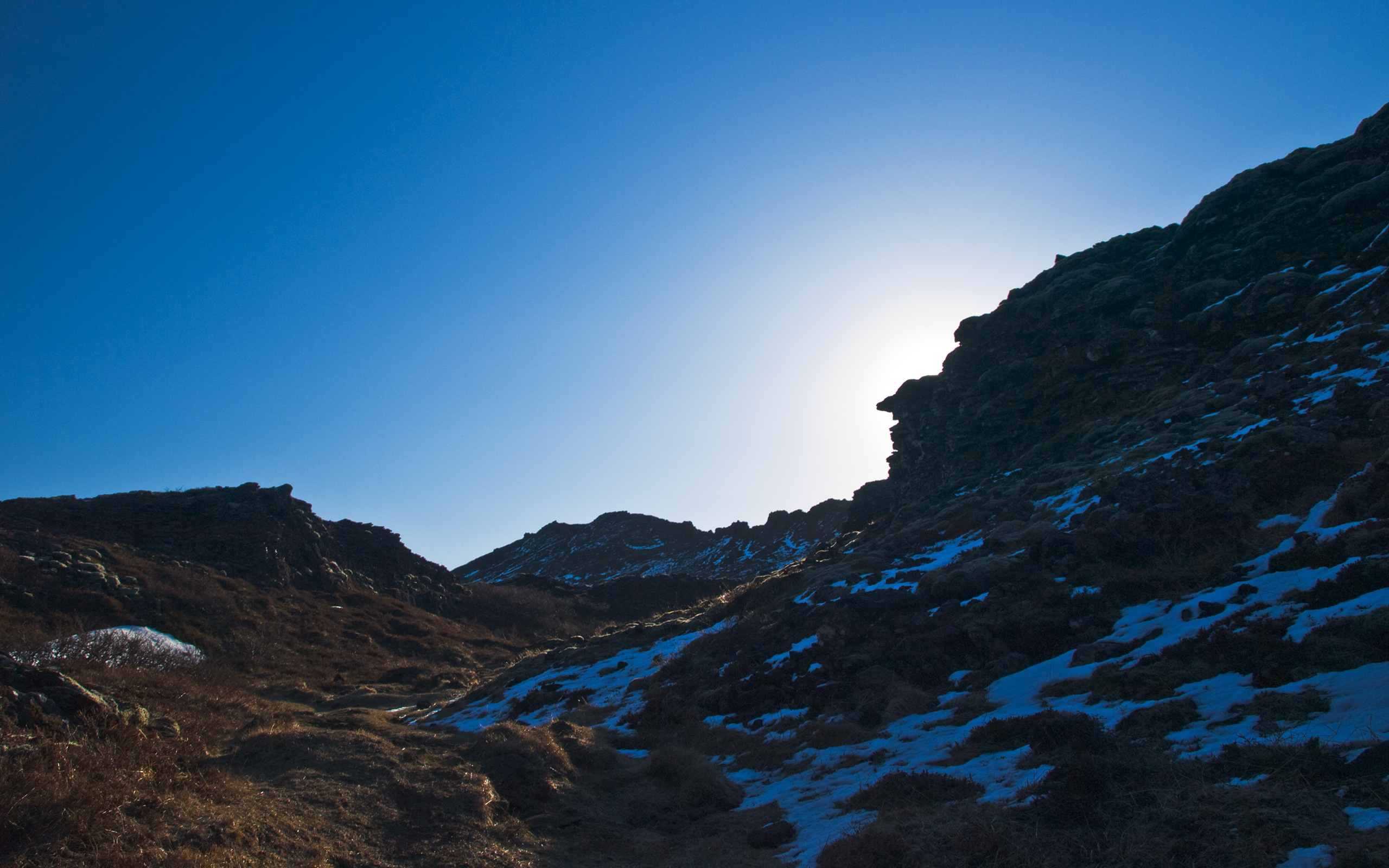
Lower part of Búrfellsgjá

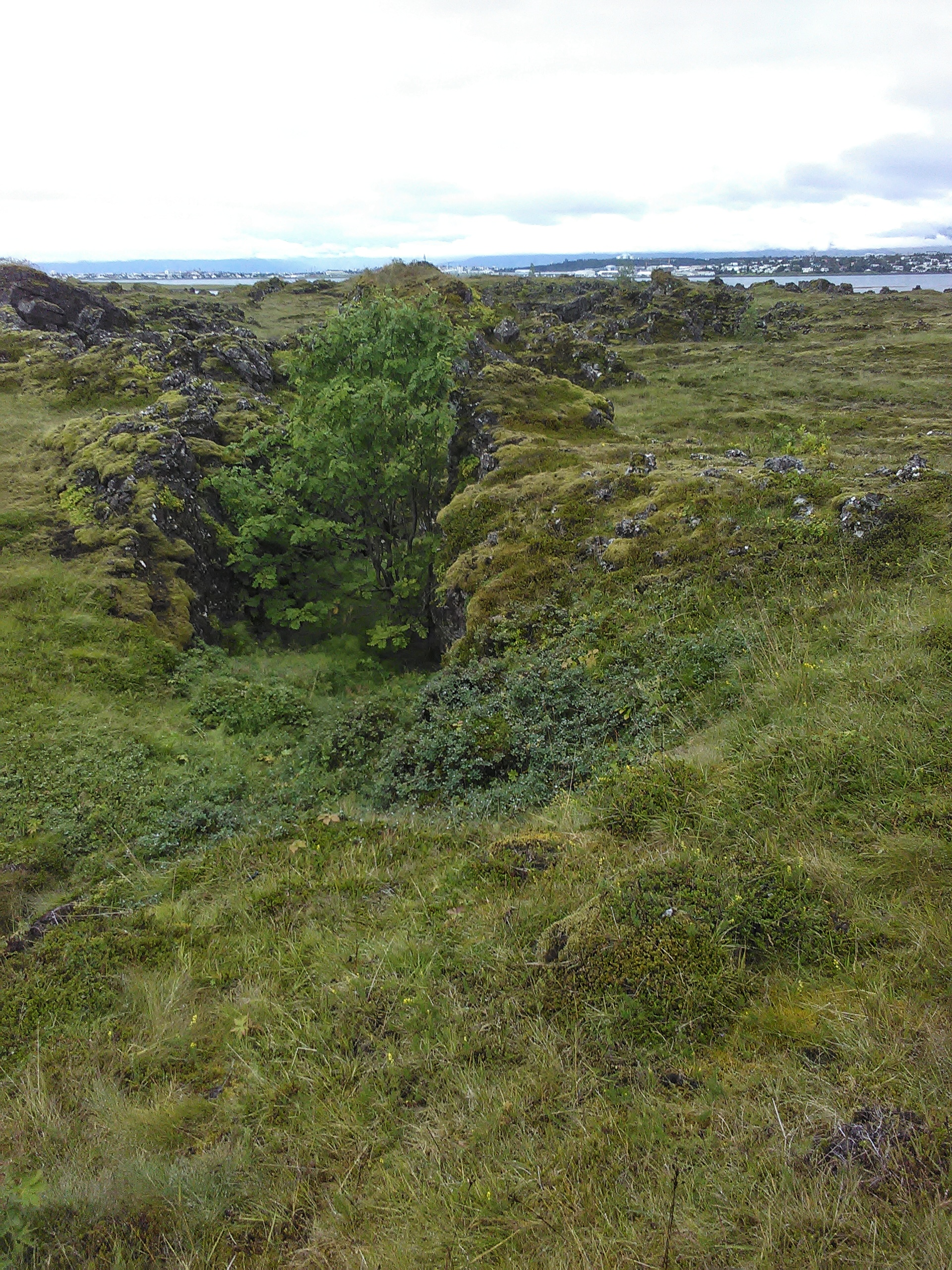
Búrfellshraun near Skerjafjörður, here called Gálgahraun

Búrfell (Icelandic pronunciation: [ˈpurˌfɛtl̥]) and the connected lava channel Búrfellsgjá [ˈpurˌfɛlsˌcauː] are famous and protected landmarks of the Reykjanes peninsula, Southwest Iceland. They are part of the Krýsuvík volcanic system.

== Name ==
The name Búrfell is widespread in Iceland. It means "pantry mountain"

== Pyroclastic cone Búrfell ==
The spatter cone Búrfell is located at about 7 km (4.3 mi) from Hafnarfjörður in Heiðmörk, part of the Krýsuvík volcanic system. and its northernmost outpost as a volcano. The volcanic cones sits on older lava layers, the Tertiary Grey Basalt lavas which are the basement rocks of the area of Heiðmörk.

It originated in an eruption series from the same source. When these eruptions took place is still discussed, M. Traustadóttir proposes a date about 7300 years ago, other scientists argue that it was over 8000 years ago

The Búrfell cone has a near-circular form "with ramparts made up almost entirely of spatter ejected by lava fountains". The 80 m high crater rims enclose a 60 m and 140 m wide crater. During the eruption, it contained a lava lake.

Búrfell is an exception in the volcanic landscape of the Reykjanes peninsula in Southwest Iceland, as it is not part of a cone row, but an isolated monogenetic cone, which nevertheless produced a long drawn-out eruption series and a rather big lava field reaching down to the sea at many places and under many names, between Hafnarfjörður and Straumsvík as well as in Álftanes into Skerjafjörður.

== Lava field Búrfellshraun ==
The lava field Búrfellshraun [ˈpurˌfɛlsˌr̥œyːn] has an area of 18 km^{2} (6.9 sq mi), an approxiamate volume of 0.36 km^{3} (0.086 cu mi) and extends about 12 km (7.5 mi), so is one of the larger lava fields on the Reykjanes peninsula. The lavas are today partially covered up by structures and another part of them lies under seawater in the fjords Skerjafjörður and Hafnarfjörður, as the sea water level at time of eruptions was lower than it is today.

Whereas the geologic denomination is Búrfellshraun for all the lava of the eruption, the locals, depending on the region, use different names. The branches in direction of Skerjafjörður e.g. are called Urriðakotshraun [ˈʏrːɪːðaˌkʰɔtsˌr̥œyːn], Vífilsstaðahraun [ˈviːvɪlsˌstaːðaˌr̥œyːn] and Gálgahraun ([ˈkaulkaˌr̥œyːn], "Gallow's lava").

== Lava channels of Búrfellshraun ==
The lava channels (and lava tubes) built up the different episodes of the eruption.

=== Progression of the eruption and formation of lava channels ===
At the eruption start, the Kaldársel branch of lava ran to the southwest, following the orientation of a fault system in the region, the Hjallar faults. At Kringlóttagjá a lava pond formed when the lava flow was stopped temporarily by topography. Until then, the lava transport had taken place in open channels. The lava flow advanced then towards Kaldársel where today there is a hut and parking area for hikers, and from there towards the north, fed by Kringlóttagjá lava pond. There lava tubes formed.

=== Búrfellsgjá ===
The lava channel Búrfellsgjá which reaches 3.5 km (2.2 mi) from the crater in northwestern direction, is said to have built up, when there was a lava lake overflow. After some time, the lava production stopped suddenly and this is the reason why the lava channel is still so well preserved.

As the Krýsuvík system had undergone a number of earthquake series in the years before 2012, levelling measurements were carried out in Búrfellsgjá in this year and compared to others from the years before. These measurements showed subsidence which could possibly be explained by extension movements of the fissure system.

=== Other lava channels ===
Another lava channel reaches west from Búrfell in direction of Kaldársel, but as it is filled up with lava, it is not easily found as a landscape feature. This is the oldest lava channel, it is named Lambagjá ([ˈlampaˌcauː], "lamb canyon"), the youngest is Kringlóttagjá ([ˈkʰriŋlˌouhtaˌcauː], "round canyon") south of Búrfellsgjá, where there was also a lava pond.

== Lava tubes of Búrfellshraun ==
Two lava tubes are described in connection with Búrfellshraun: Þorsteinshellir [ˈθɔrˌsteinsˌhɛtlɪr̥] and Selgjarhellir [ˈsɛlcarˌhɛtlɪr̥]. Both lava tubes are branches of Búrfellsgjá, in western direction, with one showing well preserved lava formations.

== Hiking ==
Partially marked hiking trails lead from Route 408 into Búrfellsgjá and up on Búrfell.

== Protected Area ==
This area of Garðabær municipality became a protected natural monument on June 25th 2020.
