= Seltún Hot Springs =

Geothermal hot spring area in Iceland

- Krýsuvík-Seltún Geothermal Hot Springs
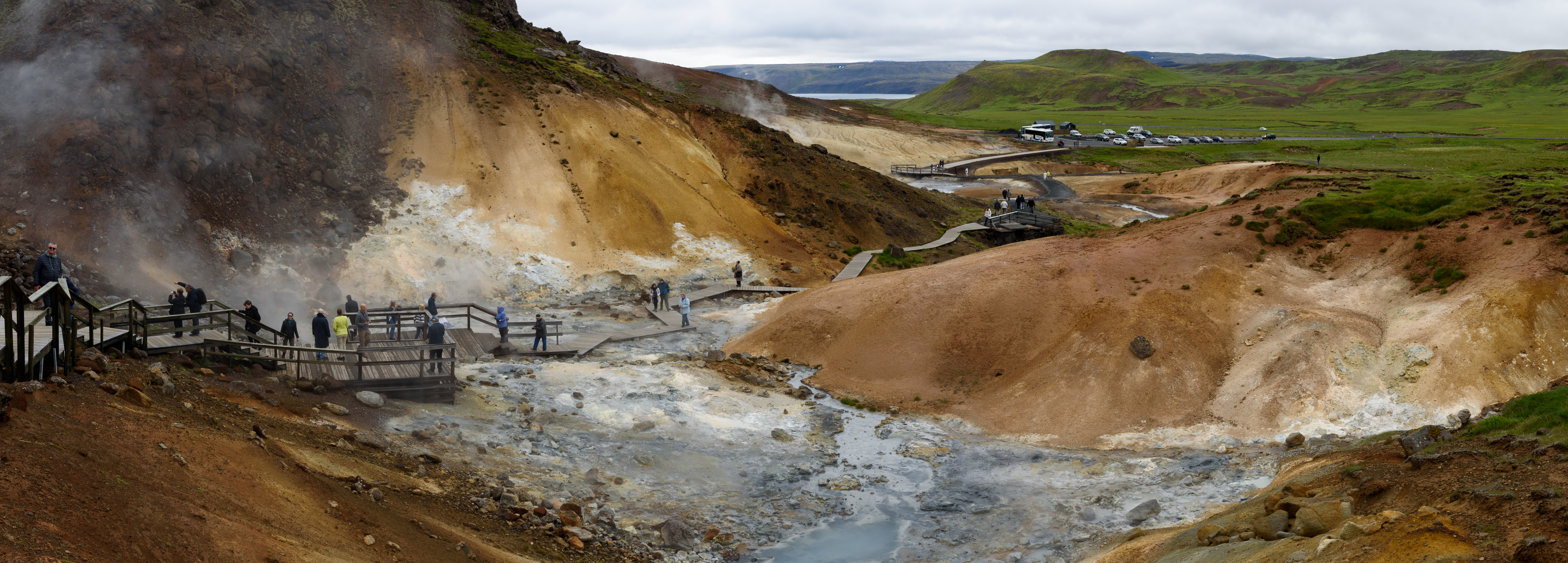
- Interactive map of Seltún Hot Springs
- Location: Reykjanes peninsula, Iceland
- Coordinates: 63°53′42″N 22°03′25″W
- Spring source: superheated groundwater
- Type: geothermal
- Temperature: range from 34°C to 50°C

Seltún Hot Springs, Icelandic pronunciation: [ˈsɛlˌtʰuːn] (also known as Krýsuvík-Seltún Geothermal Hot Springs [ˈkʰriːsʏˌviːk], Seltúnshverir [ˈsɛlˌtʰunsˌkʰvɛːrɪr̥] and Krýsuvíkurhverir [ˈkʰriːsʏˌviːkʏrˌkʰvɛːrɪr̥]), is a geothermal hot spring system in Krýsuvík volcanic area, in southwest Iceland on the Mid-Atlantic Ridge of the Reykjanes peninsula.

== Description ==
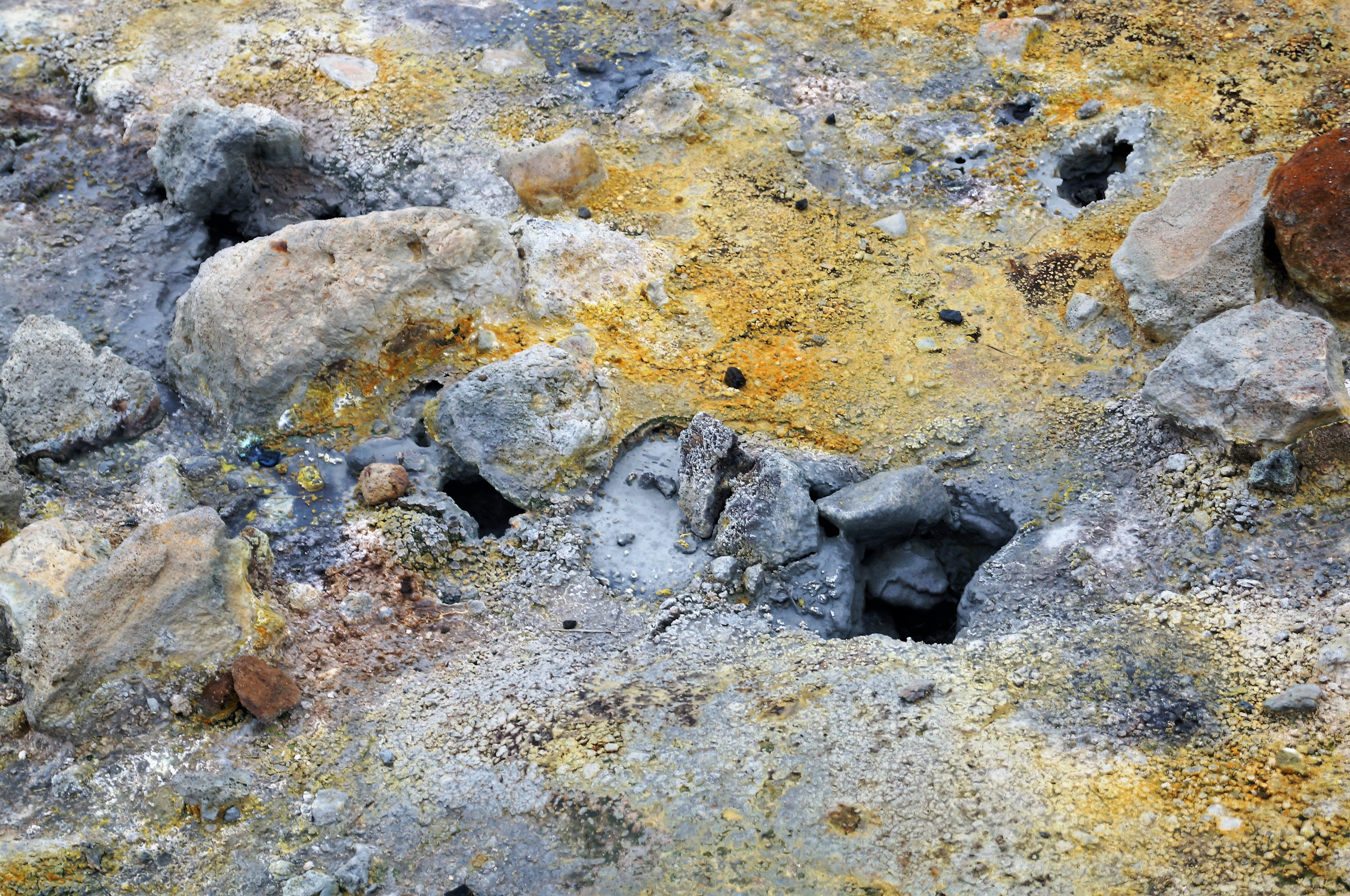
Sulfur deposits on a steam vent at Seltún Hot Springs

The hot springs area contains solfataras, bubbling mud pools, fumaroles, hot springs and warm springs. The high sulphur content of the springs give them a characteristic yellow-orange color. Sulfur was mined at this location until the 1880s. An explosion caused by nearby drilling took place in 1999 that opened up a large crater vent. In 2010 and 2019 other explosions took place, spewing hot mud, water and steam over the area.

The hot spring water is heated from underground geothermal sources and emerge through deep cracks and vents in the crustal zone. Superheated steam rises from below the surface of a boiling underground reservoir. It condenses and mixes with ground water, and eventually with surface water.

=== Accessibility ===
A boardwalk with viewing platforms has been constructed over the area.

== Geology ==
The area consists of post-glacial lava fields, hyaloclastites, pillow lava ridges and pillow breccias of upper Quaternary age. The rocks are basaltic in composition. Several volcanic eruptions have occurred in the area, the last one occurring in the 13th century. The kaolinite clay mud pits are high in silica and alumina; some are stained red from iron oxide deposits in the clay. The blue clay mud pits are saturated with pyrite.

== Water profile ==
The hot spring water emerges from the source at temperatures above 50 °C. The warm springs range in temperature from 34 °C to 50 °C. The fumaroles emit hydrogen sulphide (H2S) which oxidizes to sulphuric acid and native sulphur.

== Location ==
The hot springs area is located at 63° 53' 42" North, 22° 3' 24" West.

== Gallery ==
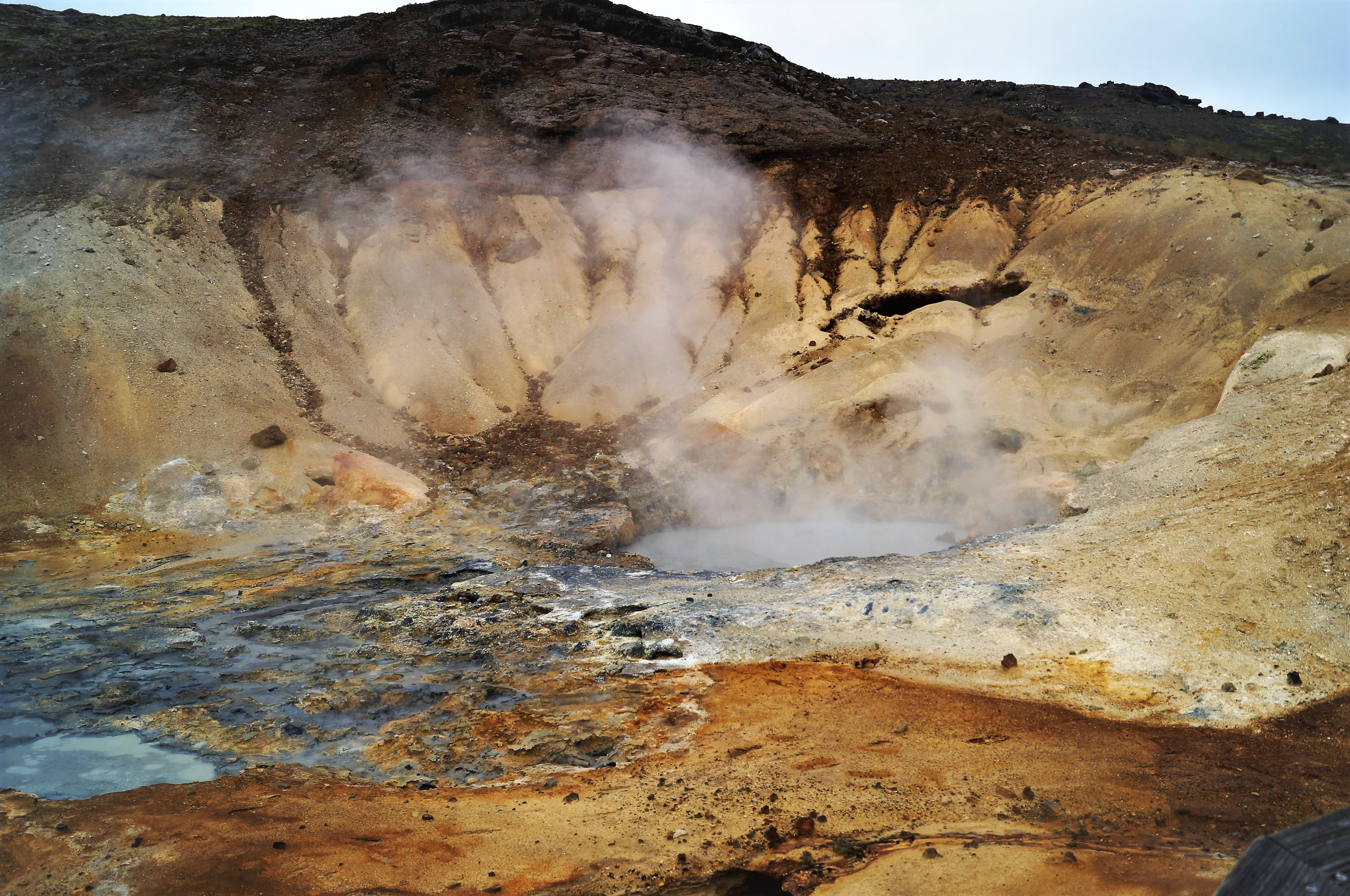

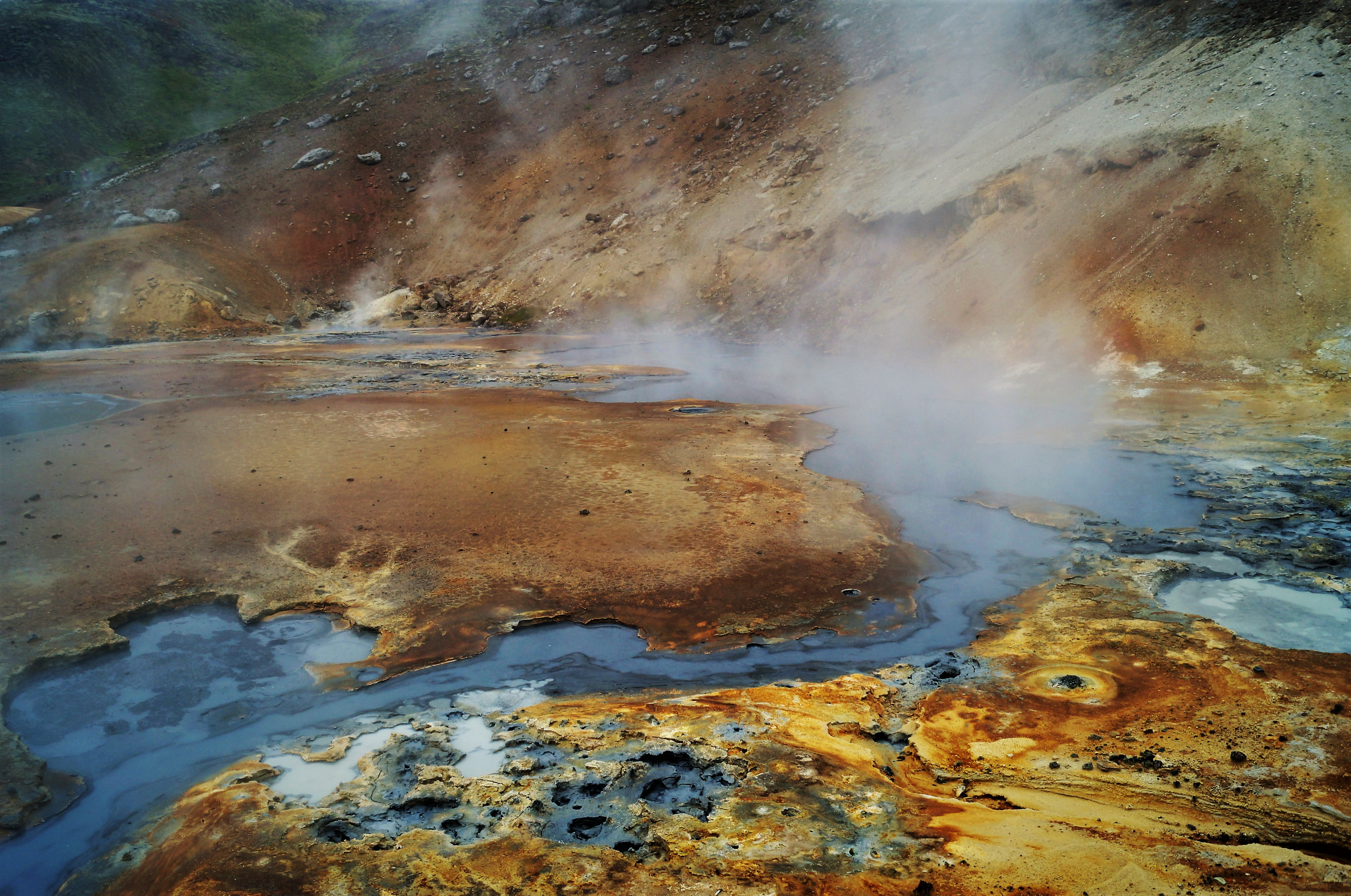

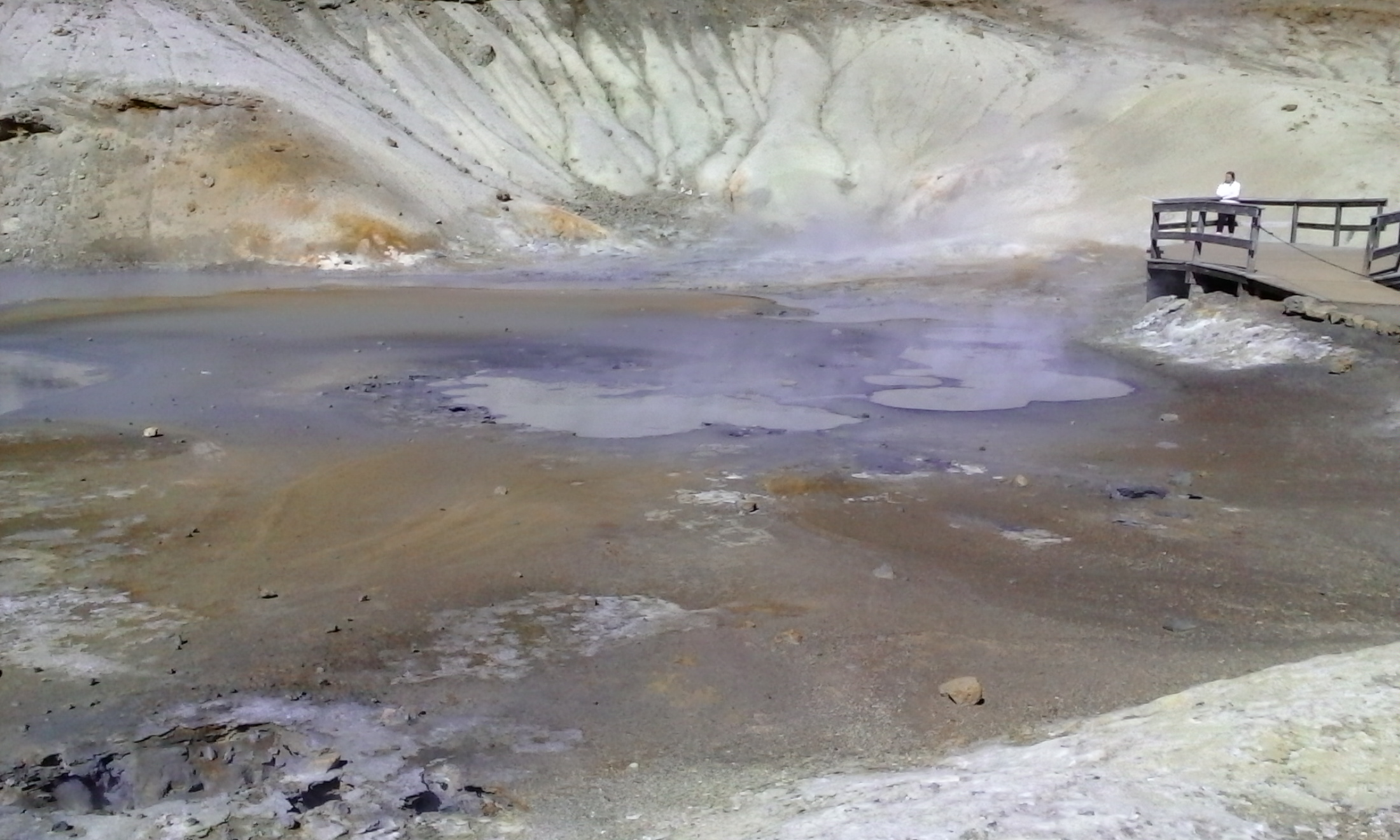
