= Eldvörp–Svartsengi =

Volcanic system in Iceland

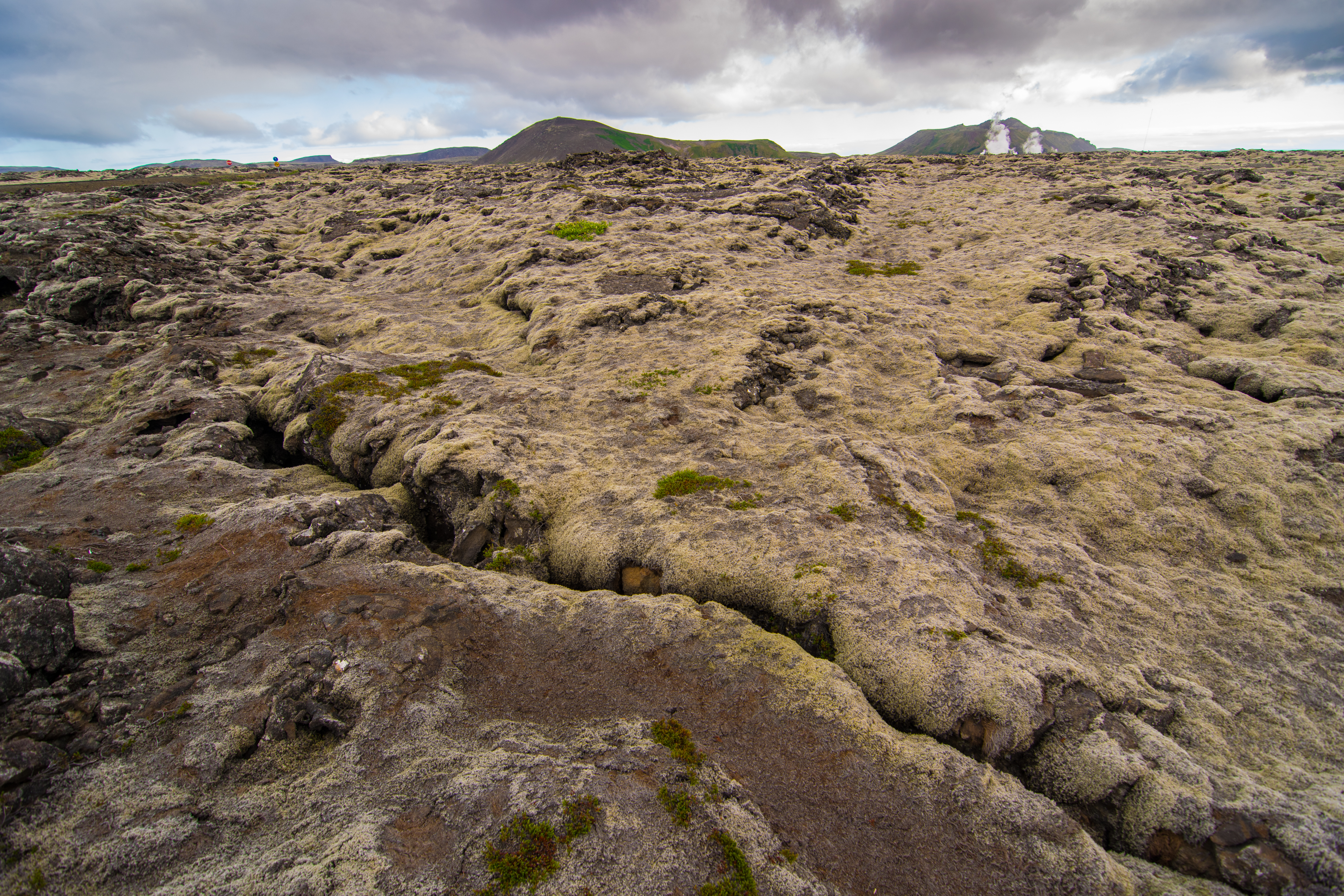
- Svartsengi in August 2004

Highest point
- Elevation: 243 m (797 ft)
- Coordinates: 63°51′50″N 22°26′20″W

Naming
- English translation: fire cones–black meadow
- Language of name: Icelandic

Geography
- Location within Iceland
- Geological features near the Eldvörp–Svartsengi volcanic system (approximate outline in red as part of system is ill defined). Legend: Eldvörp–Svartsengi; fissure swarms; central volcanoes; calderas; subglacial terrain above 1,100 m (3,600 ft); seismically active areas between 1995 to 2007; Clicking on the rectangle enlarges and enables mouse-over with more detail
- Location: Southern Peninsula, Iceland

Geology
- Mountain type: Volcanic system
- Last eruption: 1 April 2025

Eldvörp–Svartsengi (Icelandic pronunciation: [ˈɛltˌvœr̥p–ˈsvar̥(t)sˌeiɲcɪ]); "fire cones–black meadow" in Icelandic also Svartsengi volcanic system) is a volcanic system in the southwest of Iceland on the Southern Peninsula, southeast of Keflavík International Airport and north of the town of Grindavík. Made up of fissures, cones and volcanic craters, it had been relatively inactive for several centuries until 2020, when the first in a series of magmatic intrusions occurred. In December 2023 the fourth such intrusion culminated in an eruption, with further eruptions in 2024 and 2025.

== Geography ==
=== Location ===
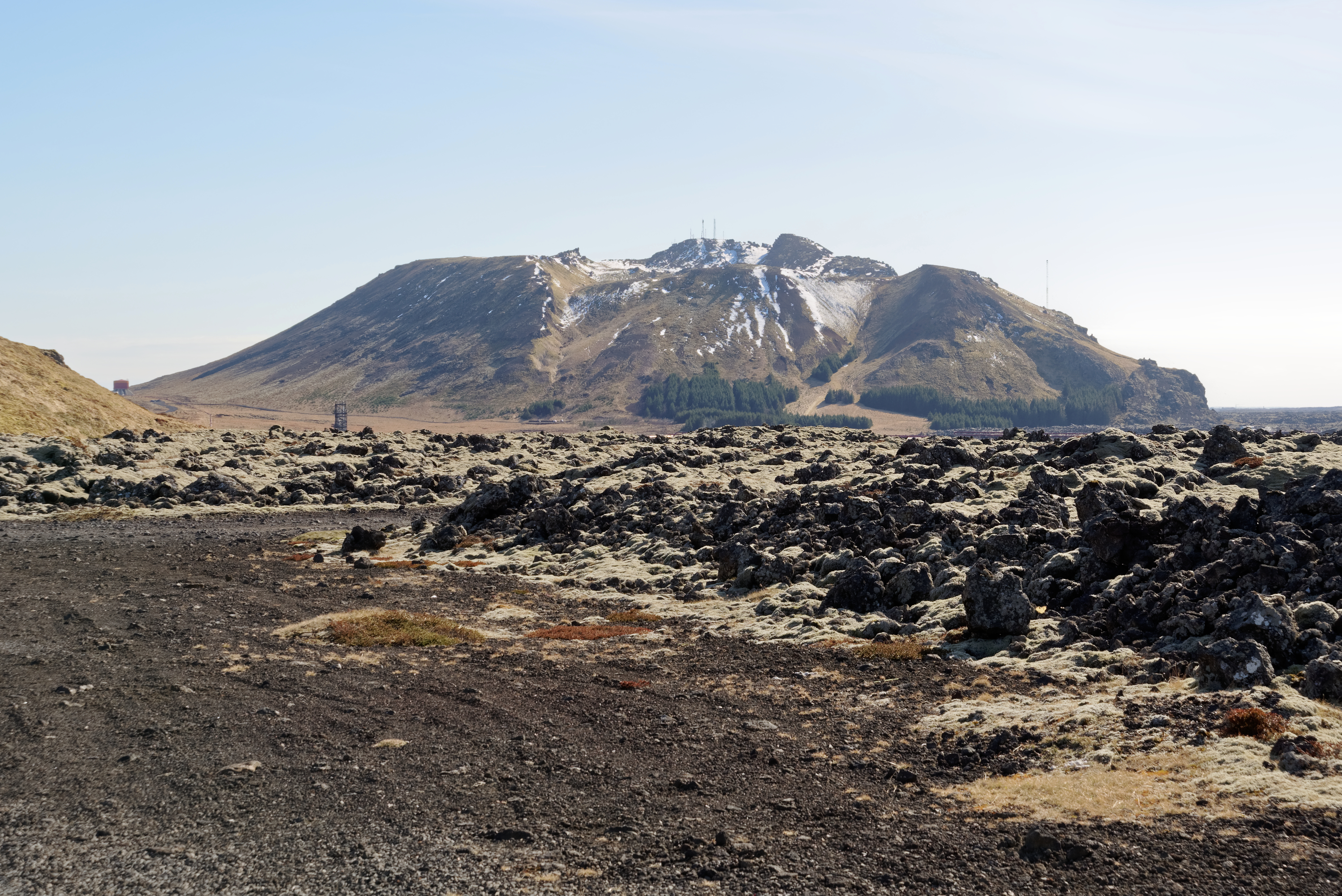
View from the north of Þorbjörn, the crater constituting the highest point of Svartsengi.

Eldvörp–Svartsengi is located in the southwest of Iceland, in the west of the Southern Peninsula, which forms the southwest tip of the country.

The Icelandic toponym Svartsengi, literally "black meadow", designates a small valley at the foot of Sýlingarfell. From here, Keflavík and its eponymous international airport are 15 km (9.3 mi) to the northwest, the port town of Vogar is 11 km (6.8 mi) to the north, the port town of Grindavík is 4 km (2.5 mi) to the south, and the cape Reykjanes 16 km (9.9 mi) to the southwest. Reykjavík, the national capital, is about 30 km (19 mi) to the northeast. The Svartsengi Power Station and the Blue Lagoon, served by routes 43 and 426, are located on the volcanic system. At the top of Þorbjörn, the highest point of the Svartsengi, there are relay antennas; and to the south, on the edge of the volcano, stand the antennas of the Naval Radio Transmitter Facility Grindavik.

The majority of Svartsengi is located in the municipality of Grindavíkurbær, with the exception of the northeastern end of the fissures which are found in that of Vogar, both in the region of Suðurnes.

=== Geology ===
Lacking a central volcanic cone, the Svartsengi volcanic system consists of a set of fissures, cones and volcanic craters aligned over 30 km (19 mi) in length and 7 km (4.3 mi) in width, oriented north-east to south-west and surrounded by fields of lava: Þorbjörn (243 m (797 ft)), Hagafell (158 m (518 ft)), Sundhnúkur 134 m (440 ft) (Sundhnúksgígar means the associated crater row), Sýlingarfell (206 m (676 ft)), Stóra-Skógfell (188 m (617 ft)), and Litla-Skógfell (85 m (279 ft)) are named volcanic hills from the southwest to the northeast. Two other volcanic systems surround Svartsengi, namely Reykjanes to the west and Fagradalsfjall to the east, both also consisting of a set of fissures, cones and craters oriented in a parallel manner. Thus, although they have similar geological and topographical characteristics, and function on the same tectonic principle in a rift context, they also possess notable differences in the geochemical composition of their lavas, and also a certain individuality in their topography and location, which has tended volcanologists to consider them with time as systems distinct from each other. Together with Reykjanes, Fagradalsfjall, Krýsuvík and Brennisteinsfjöll, Svartsengi is part of the Reykjanes volcanic belt.

The lavas emitted by the Svartsengi are exclusively basalts—notably picrite and tholeiite—and emerge through effusive eruptions with a volcanic explosivity index of 1 to 3, which produce lava flows and limited projections of tephras.

== History ==
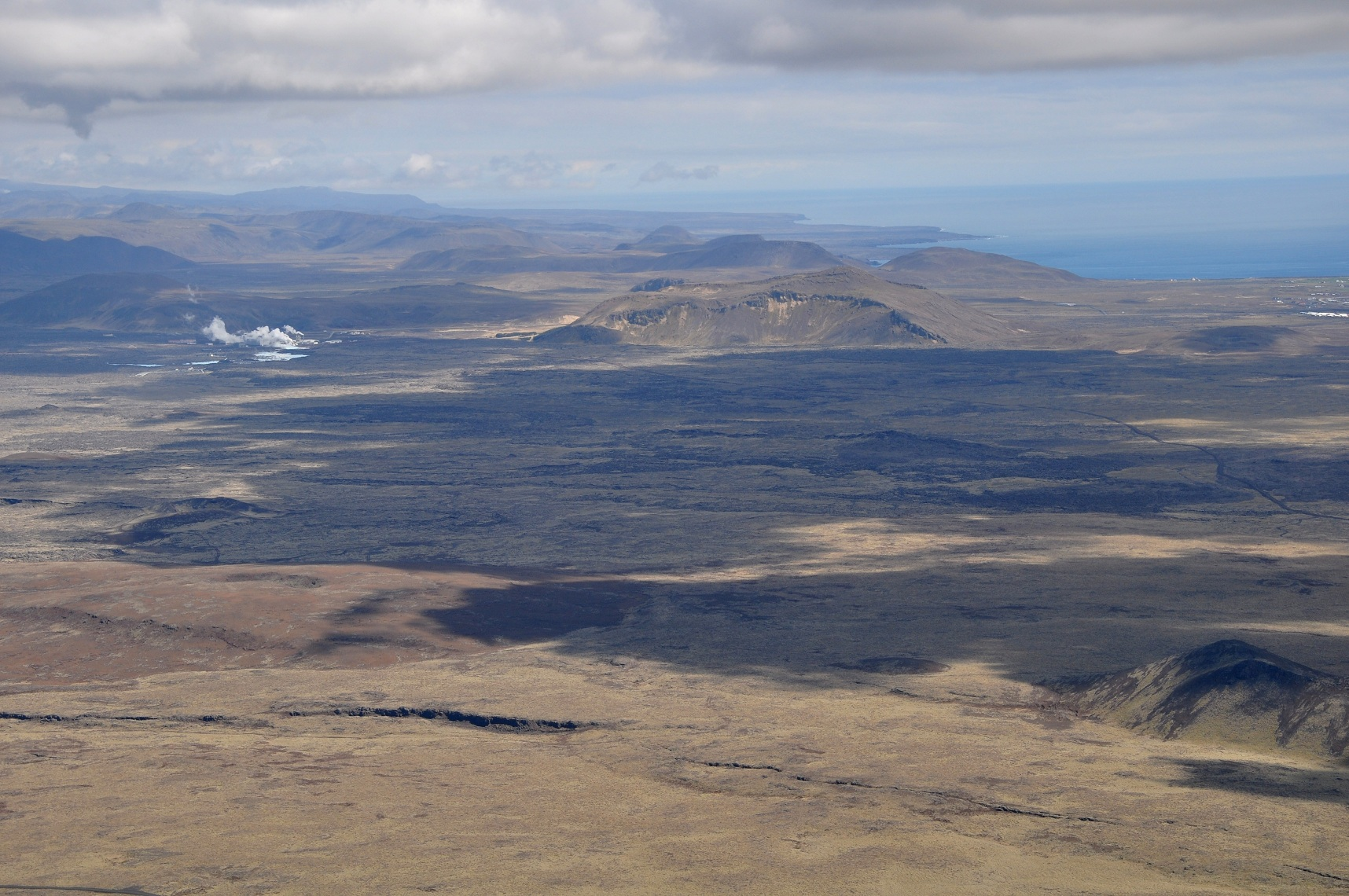
Aerial view from the west of the Svartsengi: lava fields and fissures extend from the foot of Þorbjörn. At its feet to the left, the Blue Lagoon and the Svartsengi Power Station, from which plumes of steam rise.

During the Holocene, the Svartsengi experienced between twelve and fifteen eruptive periods – a periodicity of approximately 1,000 years – as evidenced by the lava flows associated with it. These recurring activities are represented by a close succession of eruptions over a period of several decades. The last of these eruptions took place in the 13th century with the "Reykjanes fires", a series of effusive eruptions on Svartsengi and Reykjanes, which took place between 1210 and 1240 and which produced lava flows with an area of 50 km^{2} (19 sq mi) for Svartsengi alone.

=== 2023–2025 earthquakes and eruptions ===
In December 2019 volcanic activity began near the hyaloclastite mountain Þorbjörn, which indicated that the Reykjanes Peninsula was beginning a new volcanic cycle after 800 years of inactivity. In the following years, multiple magmatic intrusions have formed in the Eldvörp–Svartsengi volcanic system, the first four of which stalled before reaching the surface. During this time volcanic unrest on the peninsula was mostly associated with the neighbouring Fagradalsfjall system, where three out of four confirmed magmatic intrusions culminated in volcanic eruptions.

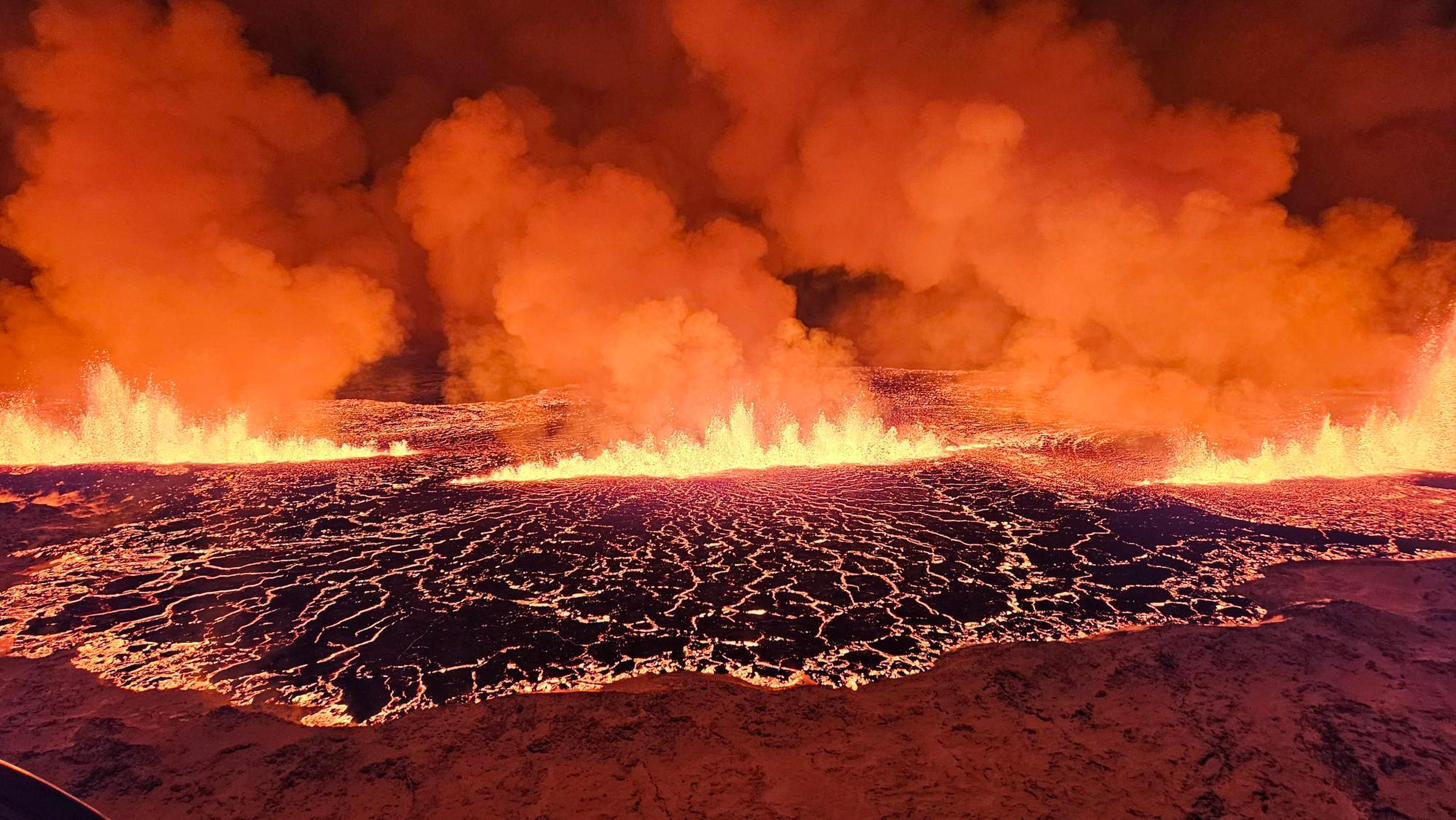
An aerial photo of the 2023 eruption taken by the IMO.

On 24 October 2023, a new magmatic intrusion underneath the area caused a swarm of intense earthquakes to begin. Several hundred tremors were detected daily with hypocenters between 6 and 1.5 kilometres (3.7 and 0.9 mi) deep, the vast majority of magnitude less than 3 but a few exceeding this value, up to 4.5 for the most powerful. On 27 October the alert level for aviation was reassessed to yellow. By 1 November, 10,000 tremors had already been recorded, including 26 exceeding a magnitude of 3. At the same time, the ground rose by more than five centimeters, mainly at around 1.5 km (0.93 mi) to the south-west of the Blue Lagoon and northwest of Þorbjörn. These phenomena were interpreted as the intrusion of magma at a depth of four to five kilometres (2.5 to 3 mi) below the sector most affected by soil uplift. Such events had already occurred in 2020 and 2022 in the same sector without this leading to an eruption. On 9 November 2023, seismicity reached levels close to 5 on the Richter scale, which led to the decision to close the Blue Lagoon as a precaution. The frequency and intensity of the earthquakes dramatically increased on 10 November, with 20,000 tremors recorded by that time, the largest of which exceeded magnitude 5.3.

An evacuation was ordered in the town of Grindavík, which is located near the area of the seismic activity. Large-scale subsidence in and around the town is reported to have caused significant damage. This was due to the movement of magma into a dike beneath the Sundhnúkur craters (Sundhnúkagígaröðin), which subsequently propagated south-west under the town. From the beginning of the earthquakes until 10 November, the land at Svartsengi rose by more than 10 cm (4 in) within a span of 16 days. Following a substantial subsidence of 35 cm (14 in) on that date, a new phase of activity led to a land rise of about 30 cm (12 in) by December 8, which surpassed the level that was previously reached before 10 November.

On the evening of 18 December 2023, a volcanic eruption began near Hagafell [ˈhaːɣaˌfɛtl̥], about 4 km (2.5 miles) north-east of Grindavík, following a series of small earthquakes that began at around 21:00 local time. The Icelandic Meteorological Office stated that the eruption stemmed from a fissure with a length of about 3.5 km (2.2 mi), with lava flowing at a rate of around 100 to 200 cubic metres per second (3,500 to 7,100 cu ft/s). An Icelandic Civil Defence official told RUV that the eruption had happened quickly and appeared to be "quite a large event". Following an earthquake swarm warning in the early hours of the 14 January 2024, those that had returned to the town of Grindavík were re-evacuated shortly before further fissure eruptions, with lava entering the town and destroying three structures. This eruption only lasted two days; however, as of 17 January 2024, there was still measurable magma influx below Sundhnúkar and Grindavík, which meant that the possibility of additional fissures opening in the coming days remained elevated. The next eruption commenced on the early morning of 8 February 2024, stopped the next day, and was followed by a diking event that did not reach the surface on 2 March 2024. On the evening of 16 March a further eruption occurred between Hagafell and Stóra-Skógfell. This eruption ceased on 9 May, having not increased in power, as some speculated might be the case given the continued evidence for magma accumulation. At 12:46 UTC on 29 May 2024, a further vigorous eruption commenced. After 24 days with a volume and area of its lava flows that were the largest of the five eruptions to date, it ceased on 22 June. The 6th eruption in the series started about 21:25 UTC 22 August 2024 and finished on 6th September 2024. The 7th eruption commenced at 23:14 20 November 2024 UTC and finished on 8 December 2024. The 8th eruption commenced just before 9:45 UTC 1 April 2025 and finished about 7 hours later. The 9th eruption commenced at 3:54 UTC 16 July 2025.

== Exploitation ==
The proximity to the most populated cities in the country, including Reykjavík, and the significant geothermal potential of the site led to the construction of the Svartsengi Power Station, commissioned in 1977. The water discharged near the power plant was heavily loaded with minerals, most notably in silica, and formed a silty body of water in the lava field, leading eventually to the construction of the Blue Lagoon in 1992. During the seismic activity of November 2023, work was begun on a diversionary berm to protect the plant in case of an eruption.

== See also ==
- Geography of Iceland
- Geology of Iceland
  - Geology of Reykjanes Peninsula
- Volcanism of Iceland
