= Þorbjörn (mountain) =

Mountain in Iceland

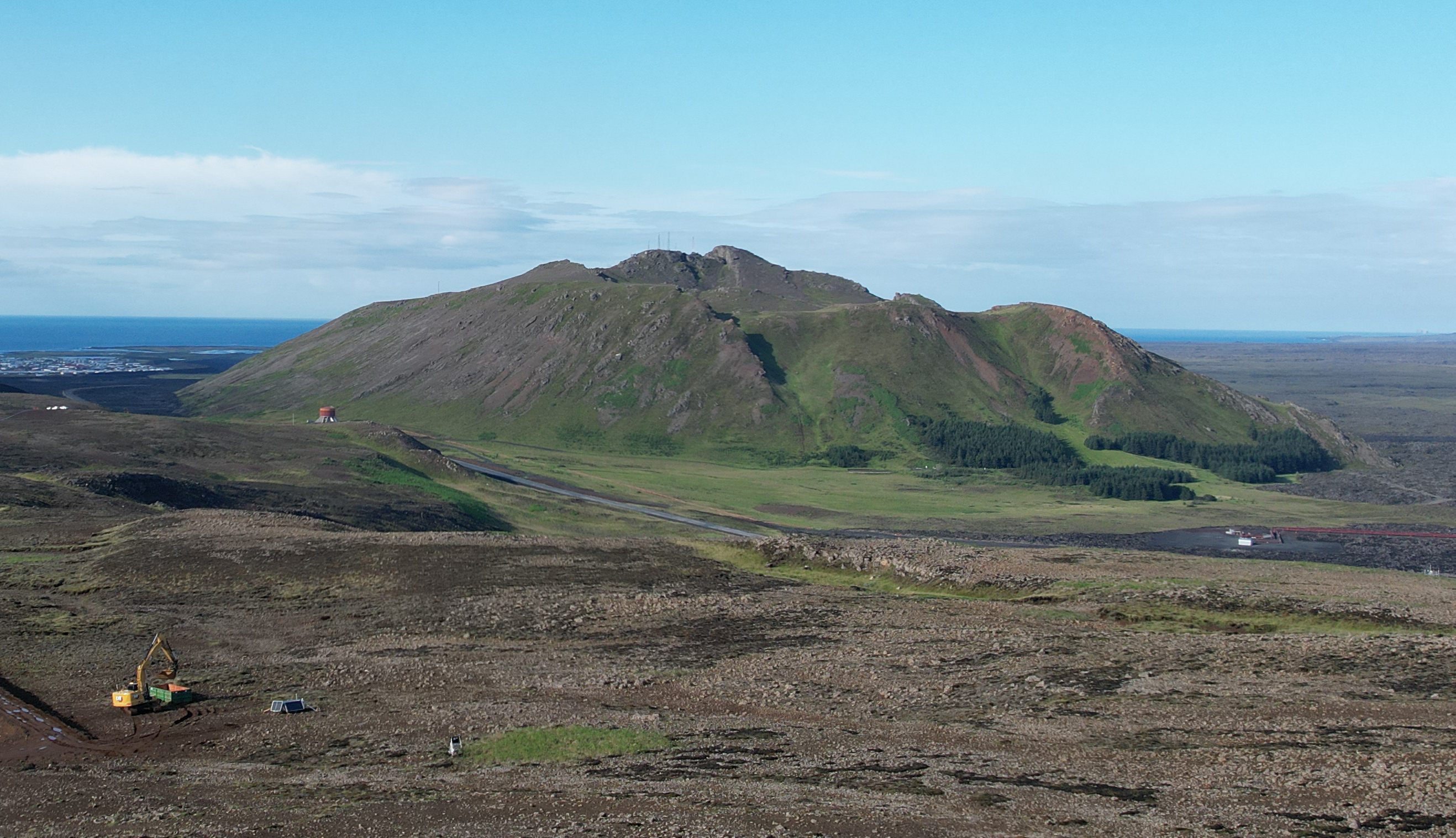
- Þorbjörn

Highest point
- Elevation: 243 m (797 ft)(Íslandshandbókin. Náttúra, saga of sérkenni. Reykjavík 1989, p. 65)
- Coordinates: 63°51′54″N 22°26′12″WVisit Reykjavík. Official Website.

Naming
- English translation: Bear of Thor
- Language of name: Icelandic

Geography
- Location within Iceland
- Location: Iceland

Geology
- Rock age: Pleistocene
- Mountain type: Tuya
- Last eruption: Pleistocene

Climbing
- Easiest route: jeep track

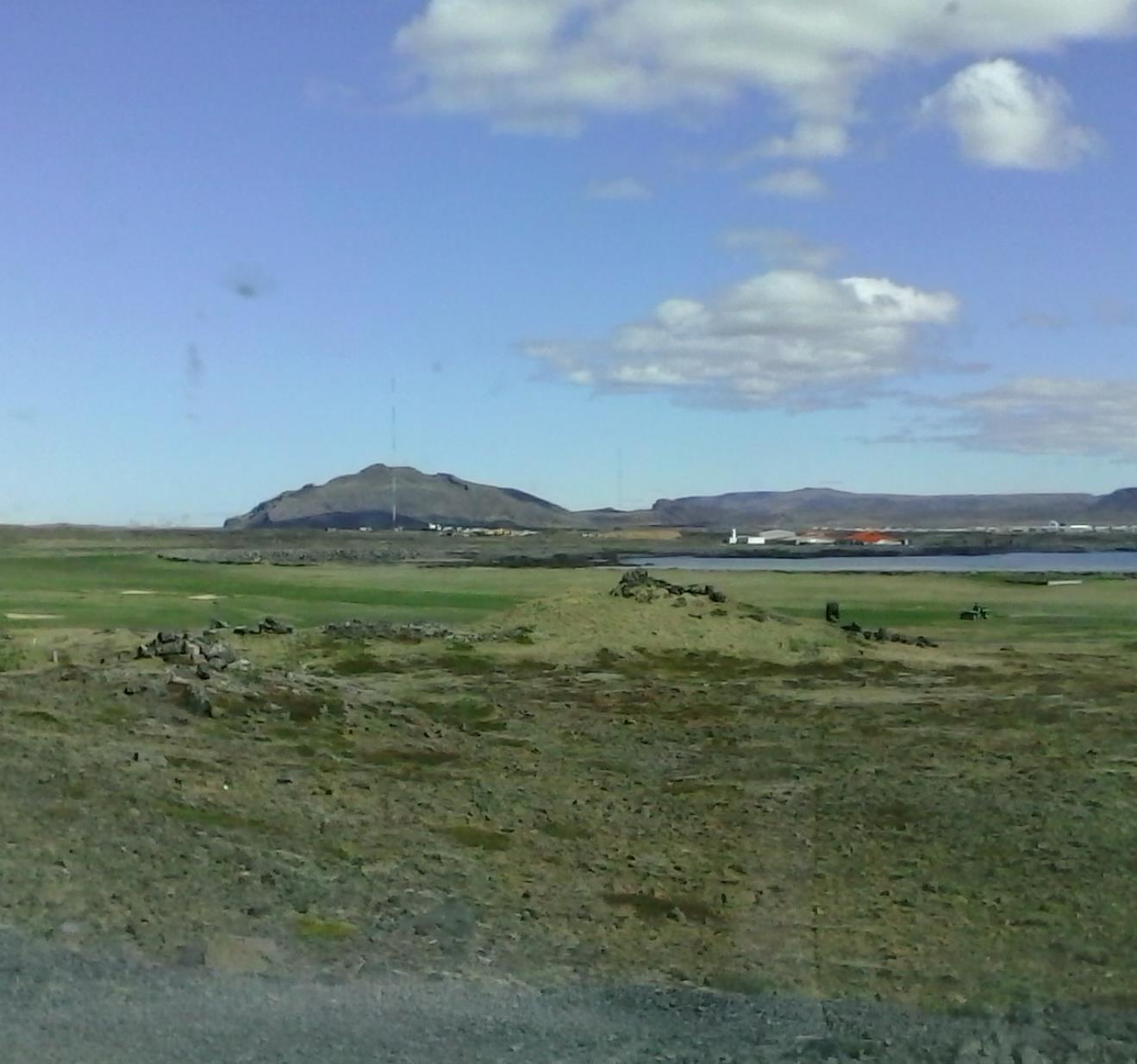
Seen from Grindavík

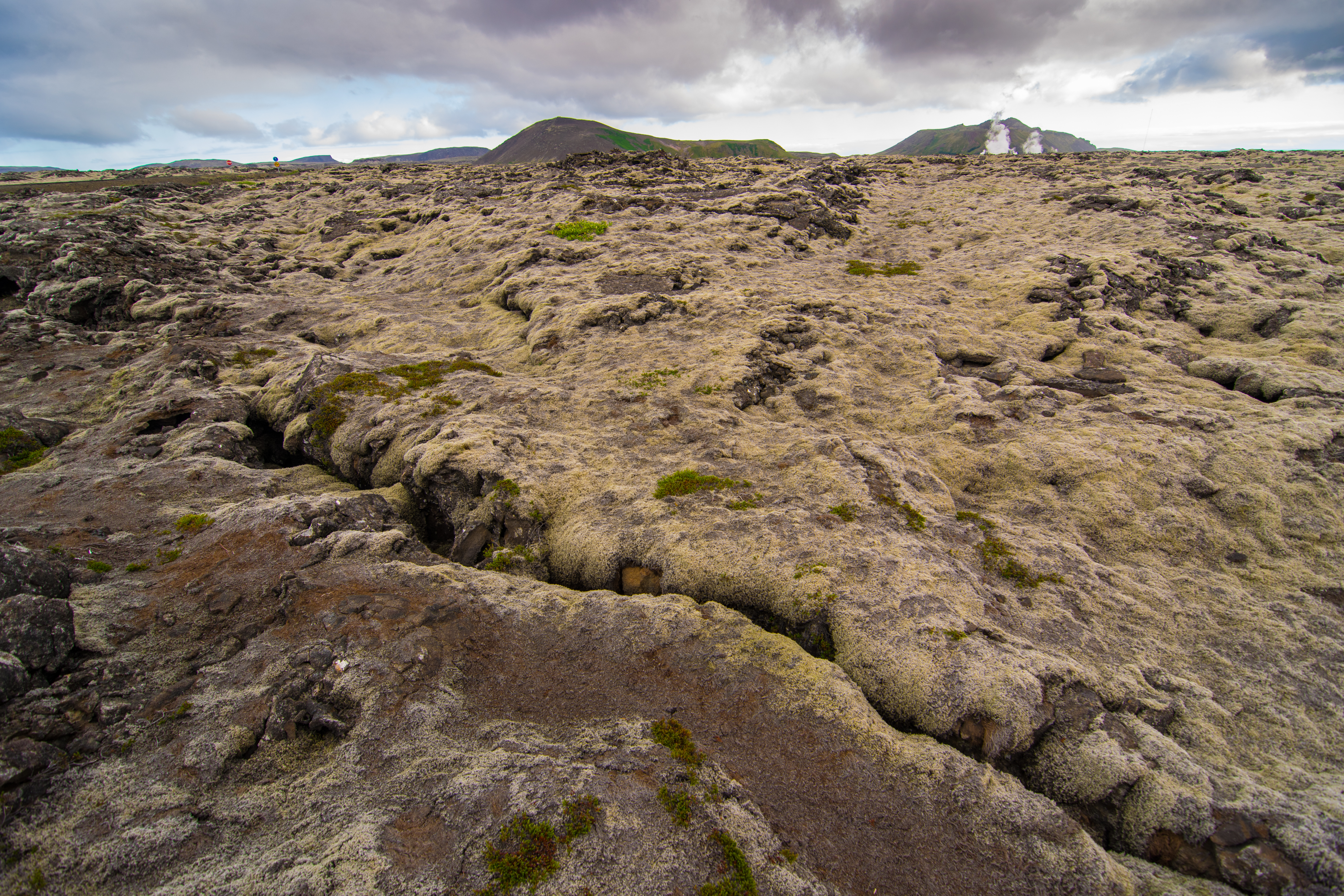
Arnarseturshraun lava field and Þorbjörn behind the steam clouds of Svartsengi Geothermal Power Plant

Þorbjörn (Icelandic pronunciation: [ˈθɔrˌpjœ(r)tn̥]) is a 243 m high volcanic mountain next to the town of Grindavík (Gullbringusýsla) on Reykjanes peninsula, Iceland. Blue Lagoon can be easily seen from the summit.

== Name ==
The name of Þorbjörn or Þorbjarnarfell [ˈθɔrˌpja(r)tnarˌfɛtl̥], the “mountain of Þorbjörn” is a popular man's name in Iceland connected with the son of a farmer in the region. When a group of bandits were tyrannizing the farmers in the area and disappeared into hiding after their raids, the young man pretended to be part of the group and discovered their hiding place in a cave within the mountain. The bandits were captured and hanged. Since then, the small canyon within the mountain is called “Thieves’ Canyon” (Þjófagjá [ˈθjouː(v)aˌcauː]).

== History ==
The U.S. Army built a jeep track up the mountain during World War II, which remains. Transmitters from the telephone company Sími and Icelandic National Television RÚV occupy the site where the U.S. Navy had installed radar stations. These were given to the Icelandic Government when the US Navy left the country in 2006.

== Geography ==
The mountain is near the tip of Reykjanes peninsula between Svartsengi Power Station with the Blue Lagoon and the town of Grindavík at road 43 to the east. Another road, route 426, runs around its western side from Grindavík to Svartsengi.

== Geology ==
Þorbjörn grew from subglacial eruptions during a cold spell in the Pleistocene.

The subglacial volcano is located within the Reykjanes volcanic system or Svartsengi volcanic system, depending on author, and enclosed by Holocene lava fields. A visible tectonic graben runs over the top of the mountain forming a small canyon, up to 80 m deep. The mountain is a symbol of Reykjanes' geology.

=== Pleistocene volcanoes on Reykjanes peninsula ===
Pleistocene volcanism on the Reykjanes peninsula is represented by the larger shield volcanoes and subglacially-formed ridge volcanoes or tuyas.

Analysis of aerial photographs of shield volcanoes and glaciovolcanic edifices makes clear that the latter have much steeper slopes.

Reykjanes has several kinds of subglacial volcanoes: tindars, also called subglacial mounds, originating in fissure eruptions under glaciers, flat-topped tuyas (Geitahlíð), complex tuyas and even conical tuyas (Keilir).

Tindars/subglacial mounds/hyaloclastic ridges originate from subglacial fissure "eruptions" which never emerged. The retreat of the Pleistocene glaciers and the drop in sea level allows these mountains to be researched.

Whereas the magma of tuyas has enough pressure, viscosity or volume to build up a subglacial lake of its own meltwater, it later pushes through the water and ice to build up tephra and/or lava layers on top as well as lava deltas at its slopes.

=== Formation of the Þorbjörn tuya ===
First stage of tuya formation

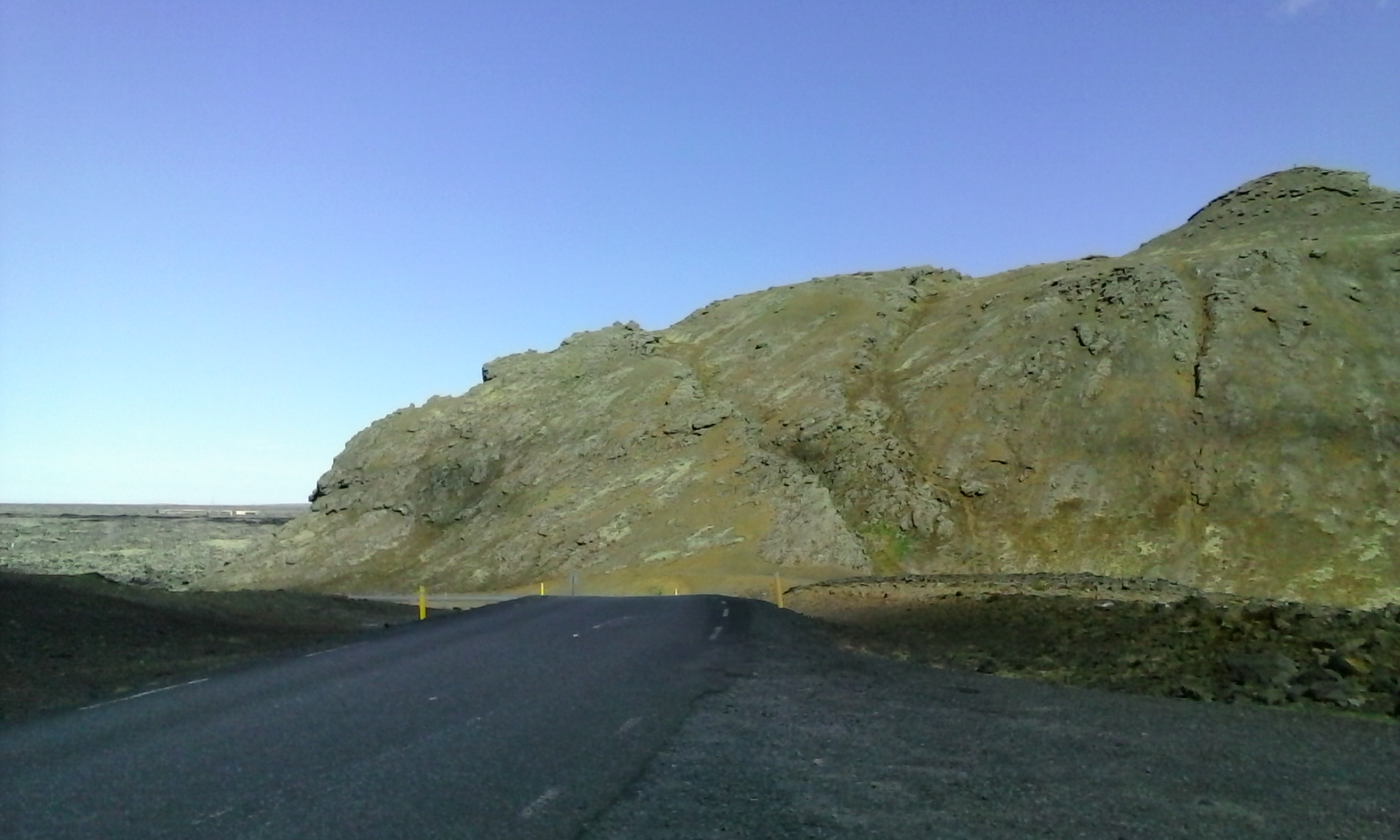
Þorbjörn from the southwest

It also built up a meltwater lake that Pedersen et al. define as “a pillow-dominated flat-topped tuya without a lava cap”. H. Björnsson explains that though the mountain is crossed by many faults and a graben, so that it looks like a complex formation, its origin is in a single eruption.

The pillows are formed and cooled in two stages: First the lava touches water and cools down rapidly. In the second step after pillow layers have formed, the meltwater lake or water (if the eruption is underwater in the sea or a lake) cools it further. On the other hand, whether the eruption turns explosive and forms hyaloclastite depends only on the magma pressure.

In the upper part of Þorbjörn, there is also a rather eroded crater but, probably because of the erosion, no trace of subaerial lavas has been found.

The tuya is slightly elongated in the direction of the volcanic fissure systems of Reykjanes, i.e. southwest to northeast.

=== Activity since 2020 ===
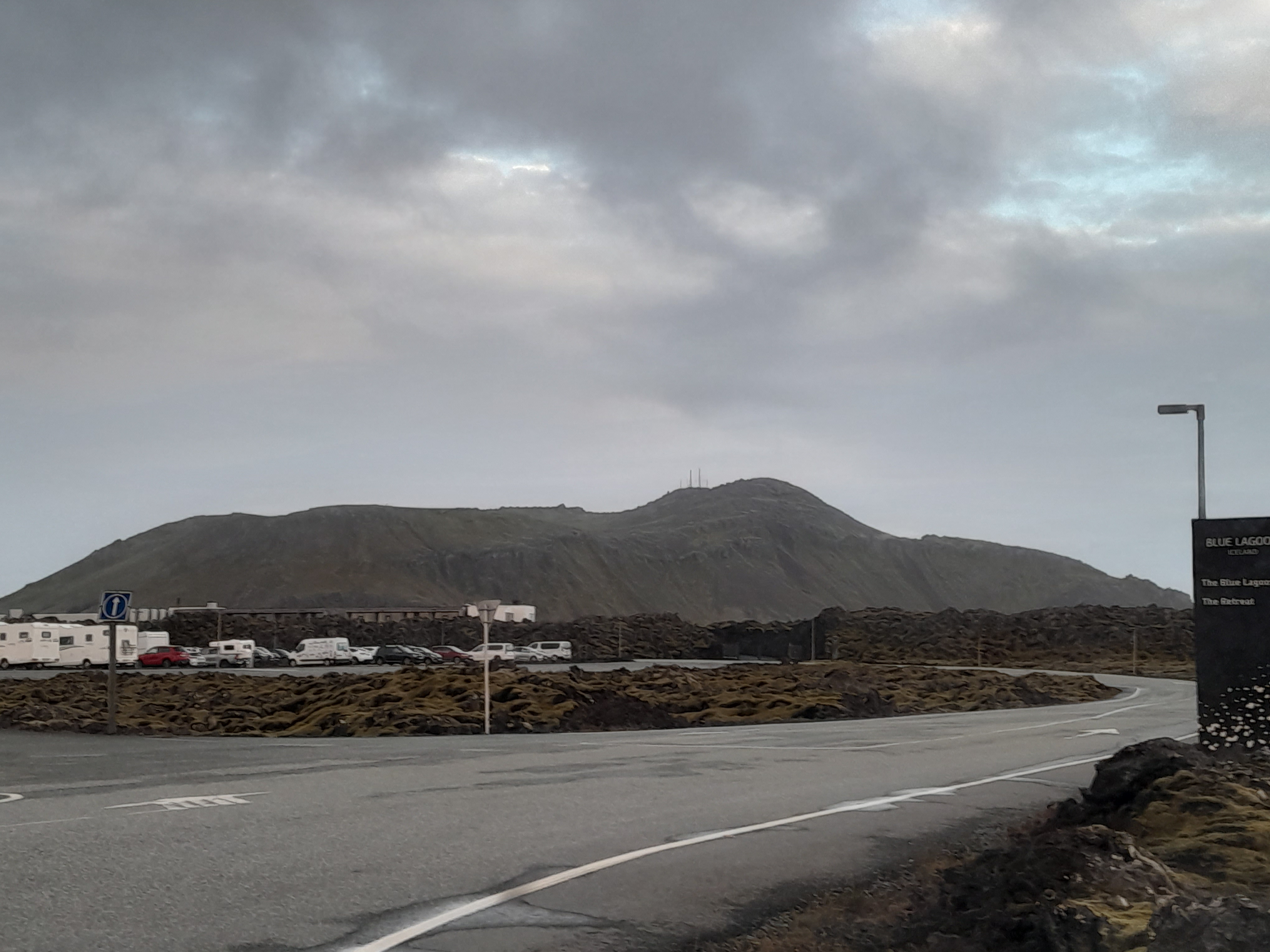
Blue Lagoon parking lot with Þorbjörn mountain (2) - Aug 2022. Landslide scars on the mountain slopes after earthquakes.

As is often the case on Reykjanes peninsula, swarms of small earthquakes and associated ground uplift, thought to be linked to magma intrusions, began in the region in 2020, and again in 2023.

In January 2020, the instruments of IMO (the Icelandic Met Office, in Icelandic: Veðurstofa Íslands) and other volcano monitoring stations showed ground uplift around and to the west of Þorbjörn. The uplift halted after some time and then restarted. Together with repeated earthquake swarms in the region, but also at the tip of Reykjanes peninsula (Gunnuhver, Sudurnes Geothermal Power Station) as well as under Fagradalsfjall which some authors classify as part of the Krýsuvík volcanic system, but others see as an independent volcanic system, more uplift and earthquakes were measured where three smaller volcanic eruptions took place in the years 2021, 2022 and 2023. The volcano-tectonic movements which seem to touch a rather large area were still ongoing in November 2023.

Observed in early 2020:

- end of January 2020: uplift and earthquakes around Þorbjörn; 3–4 mm (0.12–0.16 in) per day, but gas measurements don't indicate magmatic intrusions near the surface.
- mid February 2020: uplift at Þorbjörn stops
- 12 March 2020: A rather heavy earthquake took place not far from Grindavík, it was first measured at M 5.2, but corrected down to M 4.6 later on
- 17 March 2020: Uplift was measured again at Þorbjörn. But it was slower now. The uplift could be caused by rising magma, but such intrusive events can repeat itself for a rather long time, even years, without any eruptions.
- 2 April 2020: A new intrusion was discovered on Reykjanes, in this case at Sýrfell under the tip of the peninsula, i.e. some km to the west of Þorbjörn. It stopped in the middle of the month.
- These were the results of an interdisciplinary conference in Iceland on 8 April 2020:

From January to mid April 2020, around 8,000 earthquakes were registered at the Reykjanes peninsula. This was the most important earthquake series in this region since the first earthquakes measured there. At the same time, uplift was about 10 cm (3.9 in) around Þorbjörn caused by a magmatic intrusion, a sill, at a depth of 3–4 km (1.9–2.5 mi). Another intrusion was found around the tip of the peninsula under the mountain Sýrfell. It lies deeper at about 8–13 km (5.0–8.1 mi) which means at the border between crust and mantle in this region. The third intrusion was found near Þorbjörn and uplift had not terminated by mid-April 2020. Uplift and intrusion had started on 6 March 2020. It is thought to be another sill, this time at a depth of 3 km (1.9 mi), but uplift is much slower than with the first intrusion there. The earthquakes are thought to result from strain release. On Reykjanes peninsula, earthquake series are not rare. There was much activity, for instance from 1927 to 1955 and from 1967 to 1977, including a M 6.3 earthquake in 1929 and a 6.0 in 1968, both within the Brennisteinsfjöll.

- End of May, beginning of June 2020: Over 700 – mostly small earthquakes measured around Þorbjörn. Uplift started again around the mountain.
- End of July 2020: Another earthquake series took place in the region. This time, the hypocentre was below the mountain Fagradalsfjall. Movements were measured at a known fault. The region is well known for repeated earthquake series. A small amount of subsidence was simultaneously registered at Svartsengi.

The newest events are interpreted as part of the overall volcano-tectonic activity registered on Reykjanes since 2019. This involves four volcanic systems: Eldey (a small island on Reykjanes Ridge, most of the system is submarine), Reykjanes, Svartsengi (seen by some as part of the Reykjanes system) and Krýsuvík.

The Reykjanes peninsula is volcano-tectonically very active. It is the part of Iceland where the Mid-Atlantic Ridge effectively comes ashore. The previous large eruption series in this region took place in the 13th century (the Reykjanes Fires, 1220–1240).

== Hiking ==
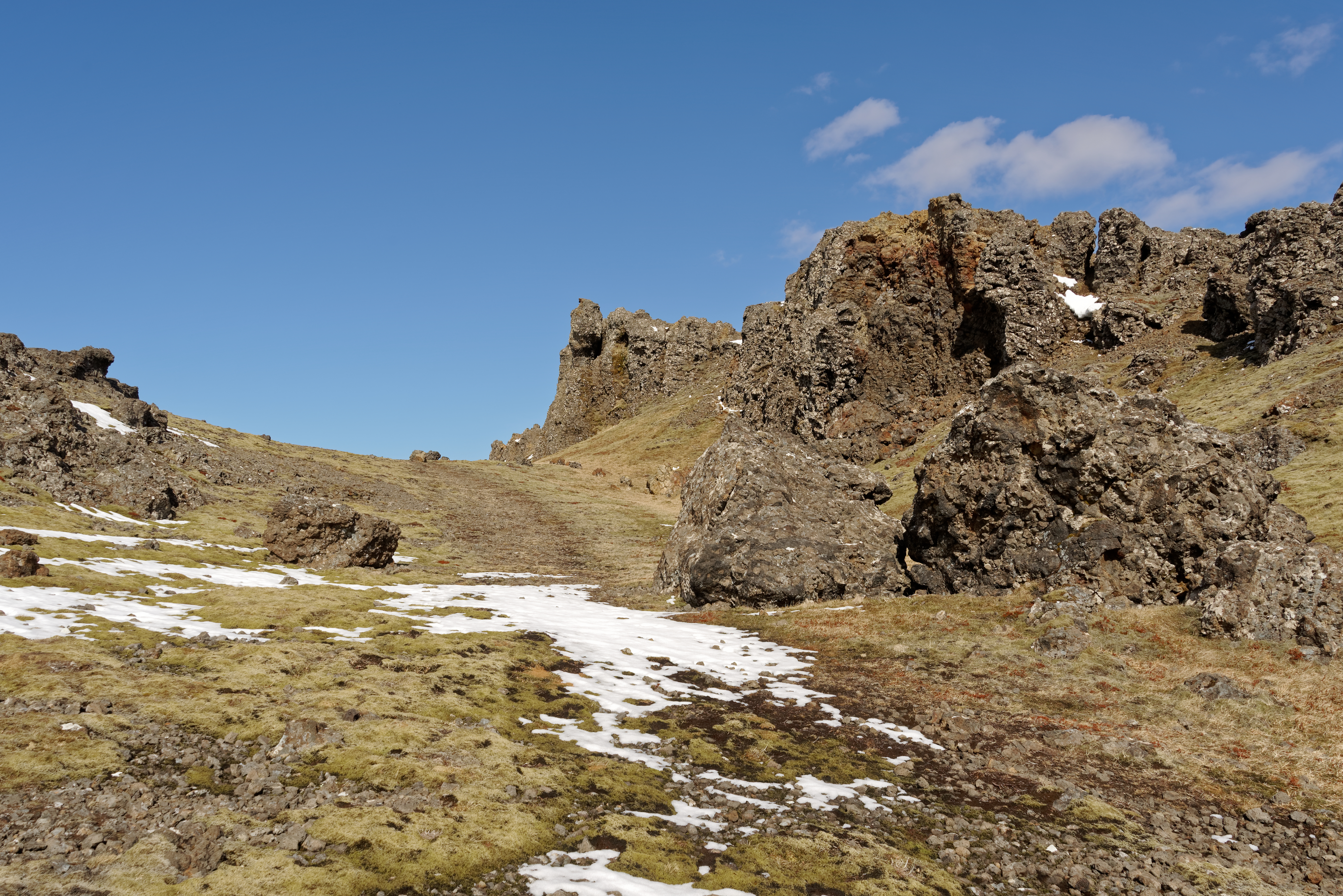
Hiking trails on Þorbjörn

Some hiking trails lead onto the mountain, e.g. from the southwest.

== See also ==
- Tuyas
- Grindavík
- Geology of Reykjanes Peninsula
- Reykjanes Volcanic Belt
