= Sundhnúksgígar =

Volcanic crater in Iceland

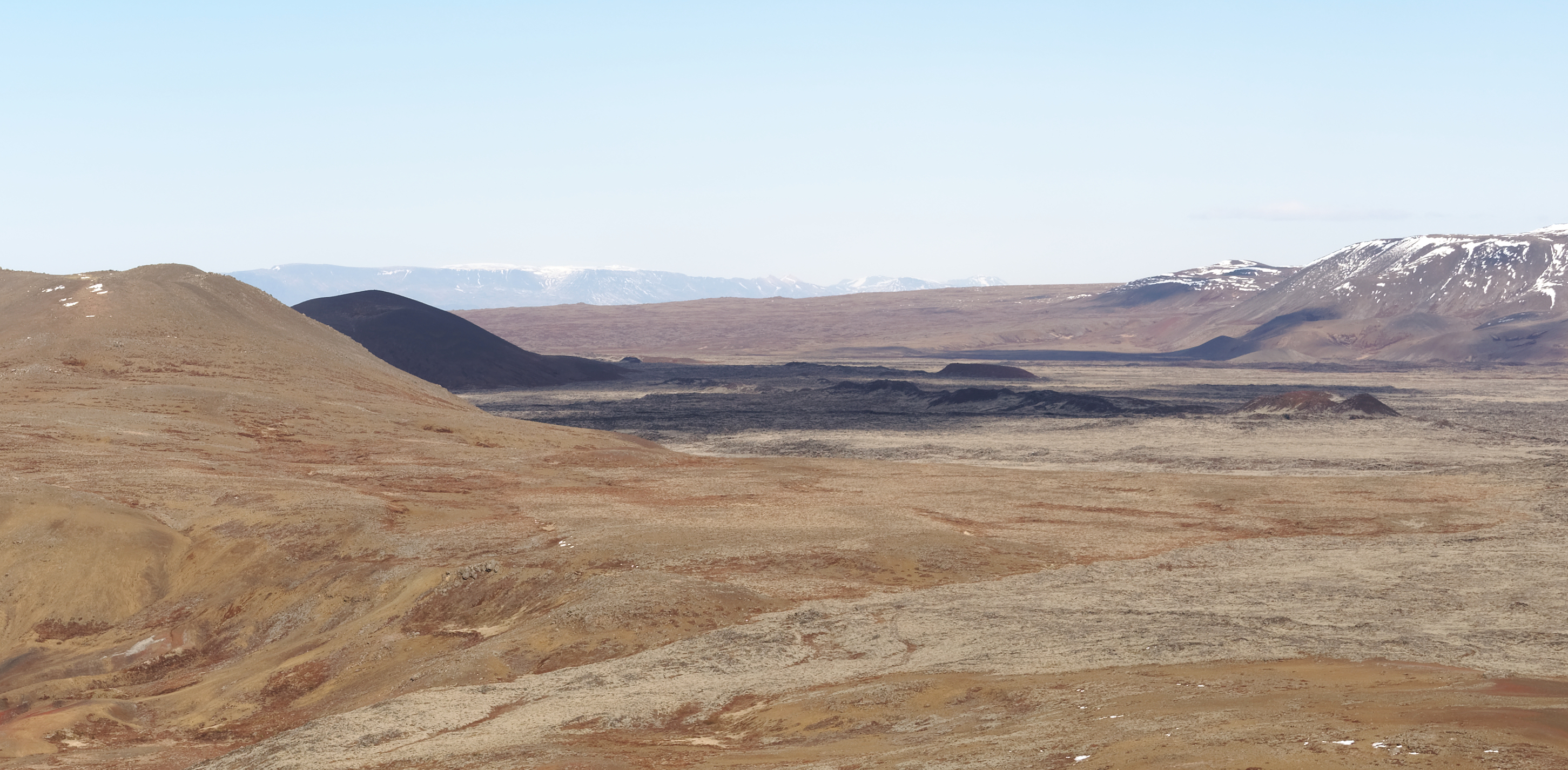

Highest point
- Coordinates: 63°53′06″N 22°22′57″W

Geography
- The approximate Sundhnúksgígaröðin alignment outlined in violet of the Sundhnúksgígar (Sundhnúkagígar) crater row as it existed before 2023. Legend: Sundhnúksgígar; fissure swarms; central volcanoes; calderas; subglacial terrain above 1,100 m (3,600 ft); seismically active areas between 1995 to 2007; Clicking on the rectangle enlarges and enables mouse-over with more detail
- Country: Iceland

Geology
- Mountain type: Volcanic

Sundhnúksgígar (Icelandic pronunciation: [ˈsʏntˌn̥uksˌciːɣar̥]) or Sundhnúkagígar is a series of volcanic craters east of Eldvörp–Svartsengi in Iceland. They are named after Sundhnúkur, which is a hill just south of Sundhnúksgígar. The craters are aligned in a row called Sundhnúksgígaröðin. The first eruption of the crater row took place about 2000 years ago. There was volcanic activity nearby during the period known as the Reykjanes fires with the last previous eruption being about 1240 CE. In December 2023, as part of the Sundhnúkur eruptions, some craters began to erupt. On 14 January 2024, a second eruption began following seismic activity associated with the area of the Sundhnúksgígar craters. As of April 2025 there had been eight eruptions.

== See also ==
- Geography of Iceland
- Geology of Iceland
  - Geology of Reykjanes Peninsula
- Volcanism of Iceland
