= Blue Lagoon (geothermal spa) =

Lake in Iceland

Blue Lagoon Hot Springs Bláa lónið
- The main visitors' building of the Blue Lagoon

- Location within Iceland
- Location: Mount Þorbjörn, Iceland
- Coordinates: 63.8799°N 22.4481°W
- Spring source: Svartsengi power station
- Type: Geothermal spa

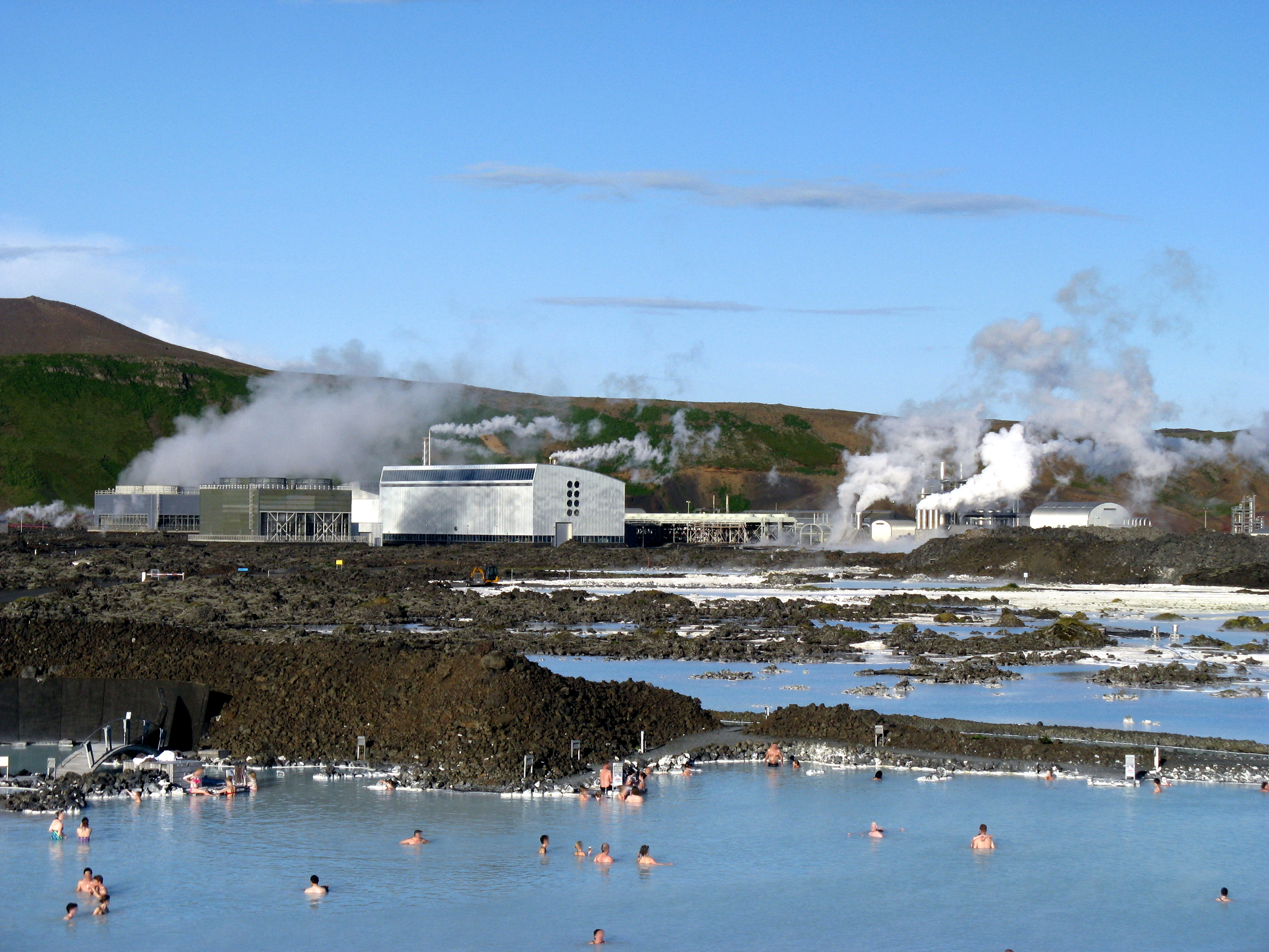
The Blue Lagoon pools in front of the Svartsengi geothermal power station

Inside The Blue Lagoon, 2018

The Blue Lagoon (Icelandic: Bláa lónið [ˈplauːa ˈlouːnɪθ]) is a geothermal spa in southwestern Iceland. The spa is located in a lava field 5 km (3.1 mi) from Grindavík and in front of Mount Þorbjörn on the Reykjanes Peninsula, in a location favourable for geothermal power, and is supplied by water used in the nearby Svartsengi geothermal power station. The Blue Lagoon is approximately 20 km (12 mi) from Keflavík International Airport, and is one of the most visited tourist attractions in Iceland.

== Description ==
The water's milky blue hue is due to its high silica content. The silica forms soft white mud on the bottom of the lake which bathers rub on themselves. The water is also rich in salts and algae.

The water temperature in the bathing and swimming area of the lagoon averages 37–39 °C (99–102 °F). Guests are required to shower prior to using the geothermal spa. The communal showers are split up by gender. Children aged eight and under are only allowed entry with the use of arm floaters, provided free of charge. The lagoon is not suitable for children under the age of two years. The lagoon is accessible for wheelchair users with a ramp that extends into the water and a shower chair. There is also a private changing room available for those with special needs.

== History ==
=== Water source ===
The lagoon is man-made. The water is a byproduct from the nearby Svartsengi geothermal power plant where superheated water is vented from the ground near a lava flow and used to run turbines that generate electricity. After going through the turbines, the steam and hot water pass through a heat exchanger to provide heat for a municipal water heating system. Then the water is fed into the lagoon.

The rich mineral content is provided by the underground geological layers and pushed up to the surface at a pressure of about 1.2 MPa (12 bar) and temperature of 240 °C (464 °F), which is used by the powerplant. Because of its high mineral concentration, the water cannot be recycled, and must be disposed of in the nearby landscape, a permeable lava field that varies in thickness from 50 to 100 cm (20 to 40 in). After the minerals have formed a deposit, the water reinfiltrates the ground, but the deposits render the ground impermeable over time, so the plant needs to continuously dig new ponds in the nearby lava field.

The water renews every two days. The average pH is 7.5 and the salt content is 2.5%. Very few organisms live in the water apart from some blue-green algae. Despite the water not being artificially disinfected, it contains no fecal bacteria, environmental bacteria, fungi, or plants.

=== Baths ===
Shortly after the opening of the Svartsengi power plant in 1976, the runoff water had made pools. In 1981, a psoriasis patient bathed in the water and noted that the water alleviated his symptoms and the lagoon subsequently became popular. Bathing facilities opened in 1987, and in 1992 the Blue Lagoon company was established.

Studies made in the 1990s confirmed that the lagoon had a beneficial effect on the skin disease psoriasis. A psoriasis clinic was opened in 1994 and in 1995, the Blue Lagoon company began marketing skin products containing silica, algae, and salt.

The lagoon recorded 1.3 million visitors in 2017, up from 919,000 visitors in 2015. The company had a revenue of €102 million and a profit of €31 million in 2017. It has over 600 employees. The entry fee is ISK 11,990 (around $95).

=== 2023–25 earthquake swarm and volcanic eruptions ===
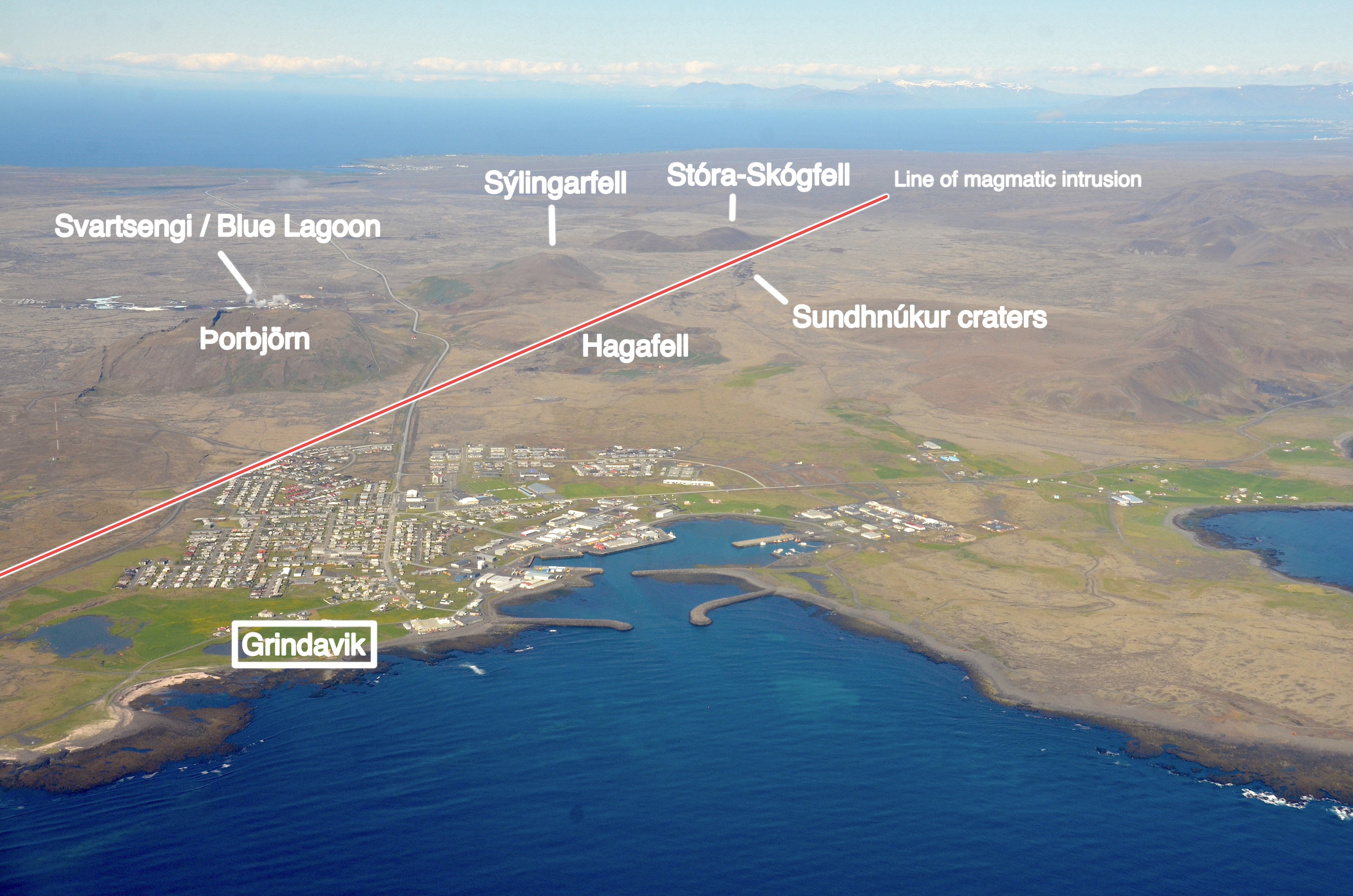
Annotated aerial view of area involved in 2023 seismic disturbances

On 23 October 2023, the Department of Civil Protection and Emergency Management announced a level of uncertainty due to a seismic swarm in the area. The resort faced some criticism for continuing to accept customers with some likening the situation to events leading up to the 2019 Whakaari/White Island eruption. Guests were reportedly not informed about the unfolding events in the area and the risk of using the lagoon. On 4 November 2023, Helga Árnadóttir, CEO of sales at the Blue Lagoon said that closing the resort was not in the picture. Árnadóttir criticized Þorvaldur Þórðarson, professor of geology at the University of Iceland, for predicting an eruption in the area, saying that there were no harmonic tremors reported. On 7 November, the tour company Reykjavik Excursions cancelled all trips to the lagoon for three days due to concern about their staff and customers' well-being. The resort remained open until 9 November 2023, when about 40 guests at the Silica hotel were reported fleeing in panic due to a seismic swarm in the area and the resort announced a temporary one week closure.

The management of the Blue Lagoon announced the site's closure to visitors from 9–16 November as a precaution following the earthquakes. The closure period was later extended to 30 November 2023, and then further to 7 December.

Though briefly reopened, the Blue Lagoon was again closed until 6 January due to a volcanic eruption at Sundhnúkur, all facilities were reopened by 10 January. Another eruption caused a further closure on 14 January, reopening again by 20 January. A third eruption on 8 February forced the resort to close again but reopened once more on 16 February. A fourth eruption on 16 March caused the lagoon to, once again, close. It reopened on 7 April 2024. After another eruption, the lava reached the Blue Lagoon on 22 November 2024, destroying the car park, but leaving the lagoon itself intact due to protective barriers built around the facilities. It was able to re-open on 9 December while a new parking lot was being constructed. The lagoon also briefly closed due to volcanic activity in April and July 2025.

== See also ==
- Balneotherapy
