= Reykjanes fires =

13th-century volcanic eruptions in Iceland

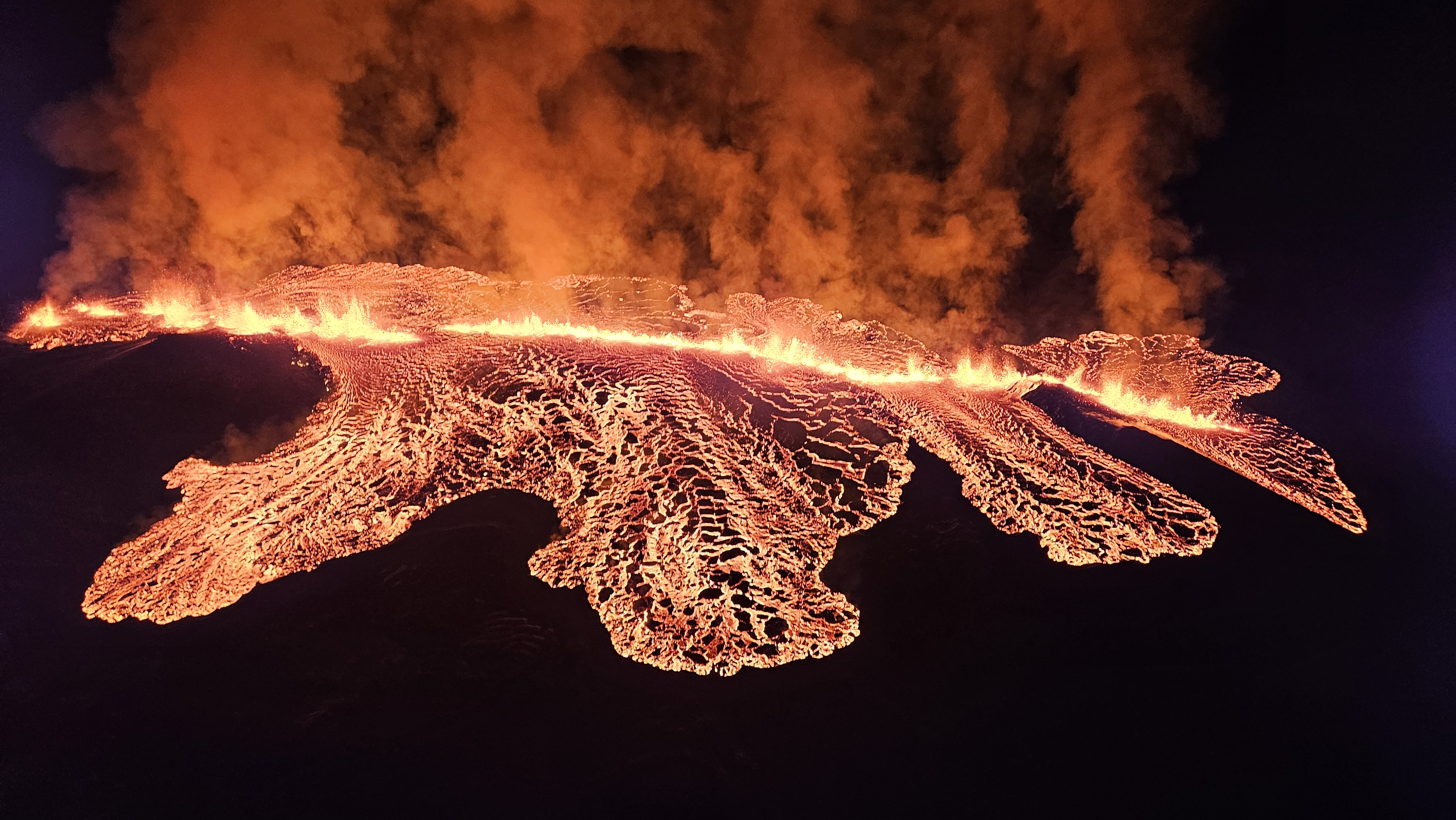
A fissure eruption of the New Reykjanes Fires on the Reykjanes Peninsula in January 2024

The Reykjanes Fires (Icelandic: Reykjaneseldar) were a series of volcanic eruptions that took place on the Reykjanes Peninsula in south-west Iceland between approximately 1210 and 1240. They caused widespread physical and economic damage, covering large areas of the peninsula in lava and tephra and causing the mass starvation of livestock, as well as a number of deaths of people due to earthquakes. The peninsula's volcanic systems were subsequently dormant for 800 years until a fresh series of eruptions began in 2021, which have been called the New Reykjanes Fires.

== Geology ==
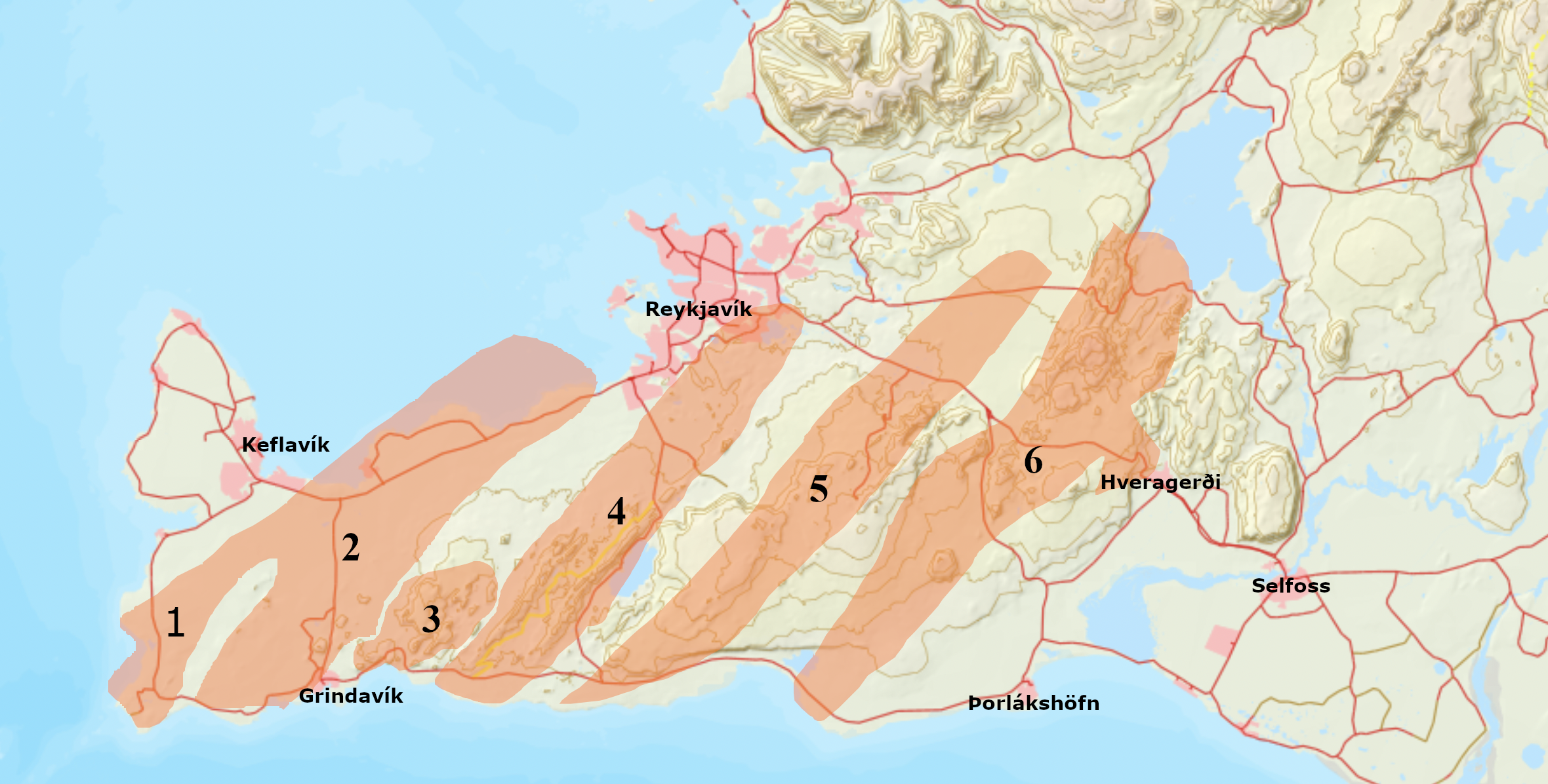
Volcanic systems of the Reykjanes Peninsula (SW-Iceland): 1=Reykjanes (volcanic system), 2=Eldvörp-Svartsengi, 3=Fagradalsfjall, 4=Krýsuvík, 5=Brennisteinsfjöll, 6=Hengill

The Reykjanes Peninsula is a continuation of the mostly submarine Reykjanes Ridge, a part of the Mid-Atlantic Ridge. Its topography was formed by glaciers and volcanism, with basaltic lava fields covering a good part of the peninsula, in between volcanoes of subglacial as well as subaerial origin, namely tuyas, hyaloclastic ridges (tindars), shield volcanoes and crater rows.

The Reykjanes volcanic belt, one of the present day volcanic zones of Iceland, consists (depending on author) of 3 to 6 or even 7 volcanic systems, arranged en echelon, i.e. more or less side by side, and in an average 40° angle to the spreading direction NE–SW over the peninsula. Most of the volcanic systems, because they are on top of a rift segment, show a tendency for basaltic fissure eruptions. There are tephra deposits from both offshore explosive Holocene eruptions, some of which were from volcanoes of the Reykjanes volcanic system, and the most recent eruption of Hengill. Only the Hengill volcanic system, the most easterly system, has an additional complex central volcano at the intersection with the West volcanic zone of Iceland and South Iceland seismic zone.

== Eruptions of 1210–1240 ==
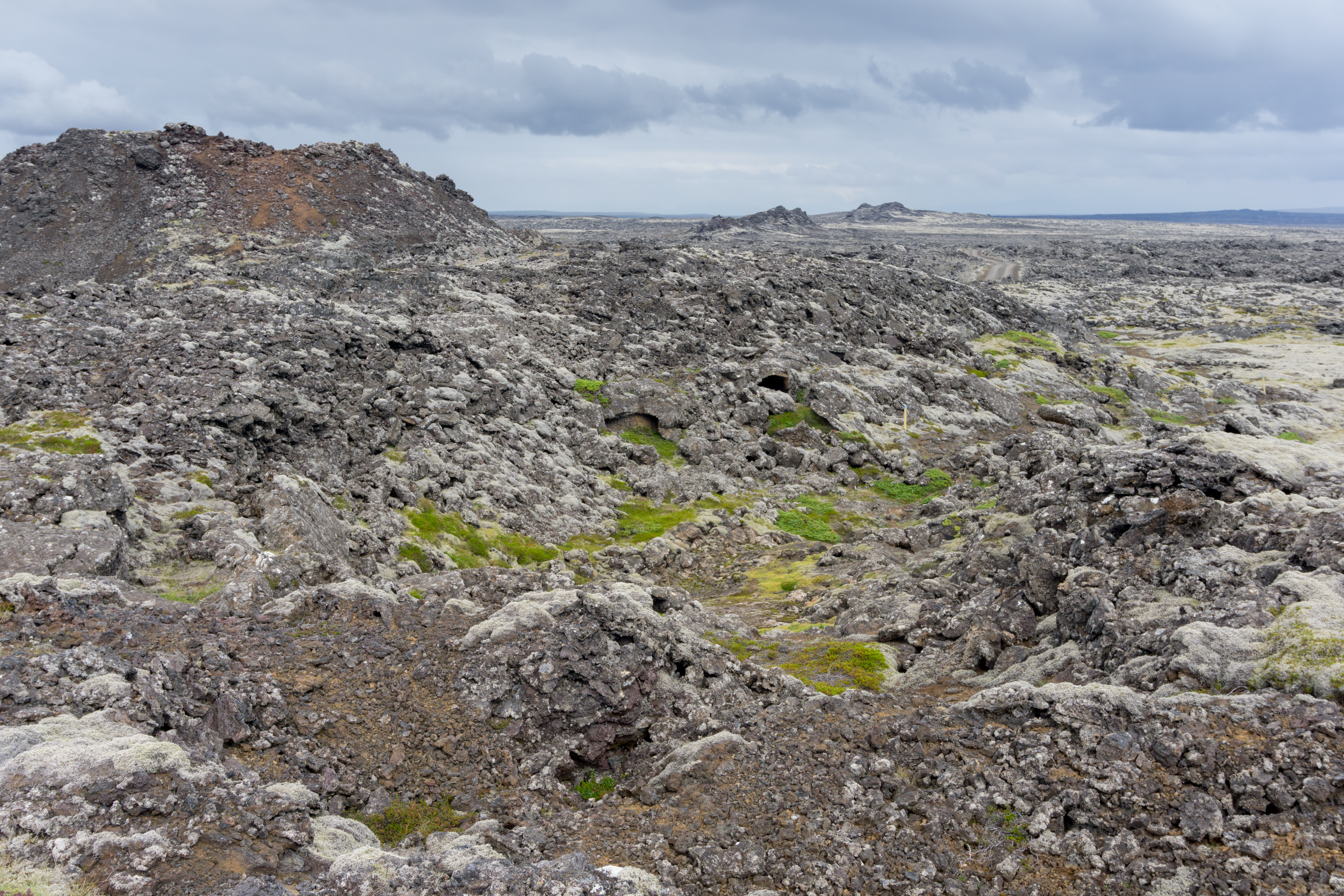
The Stampar crater row, likely formed in 1211 or 1223

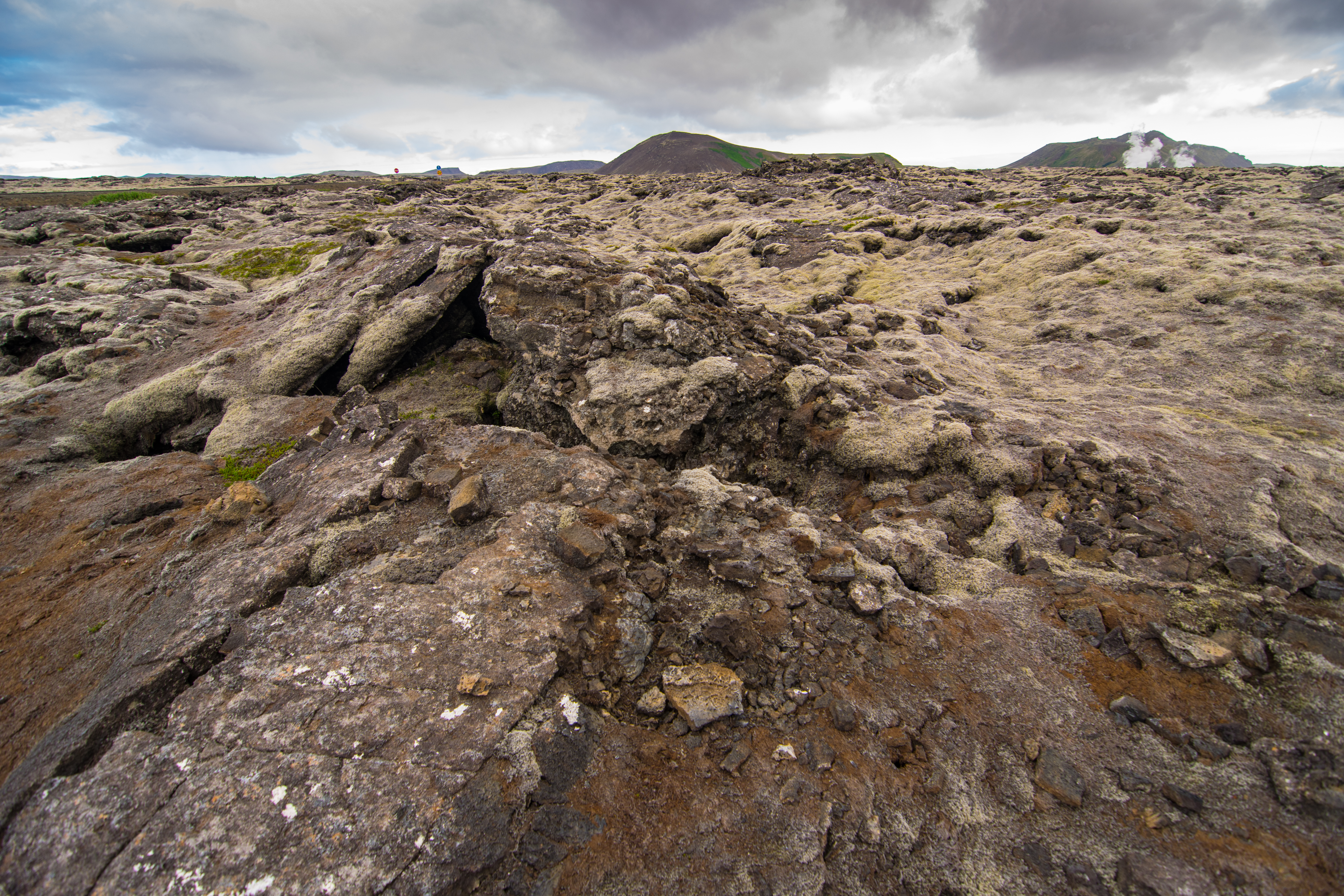
The Arnaseturshraun lava field, believed to have been erupted in 1240

A number of off- and onshore eruptions at Reykjanes are recorded by medieval Icelandic annals and sagas as having taken place between 1210 and 1240. As well as depositing tephra across the peninsula, they produced dozens of square kilometres of lava flows, now known as the Yngra Stampahraun, Eldvarpahraun, Illahraun and Arnaseturshraun. The eruptions are known as "fires" for being a series of eruptions over a specific period in the same area. The exact length of each eruption is not known. The specific events recorded were in:

- 1210
- 1211, possibly a continuation of the 1210 event and probably an offshore Surtseyan eruption that is known to have produced large quantities of pumice. According to the Konungsannáll, this was accompanied by an earthquake in which fourteen men perished and "fire came up from the sea", likely in August or September 1211. The Vatnsfell tuff cones northwest of Valahnúkamöl were likely created in this eruption, which would have taken place explosively underwater. The eruptions created new land, resulting in the craters now being a short distance inland.
- 1223, possibly associated with the Yngri-Stampar crater row and adjacent lavas north of where the Reykjanes Power Station now stands. (The craters may alternatively have formed in 1211.)
- 1226, a lengthy eruption or series of eruptions which the Íslendinga saga records as "the Sand-Summer, because fire erupted in the sea off Reykjanes and there was a great fall of ash". It caused "much grasslessness" across the peninsula which resulted in a "sand-winter [which] was a very hard winter for the livestock". This appears to record an explosive eruption which probably took place several kilometres offshore. Tephra fell over a wide area of the peninsula, as far away as Reykjavík, and is known as the Miðaldarlagið or Middle Ages Tephra. It is now an important dating marker for eruptions on the peninsula. Its source is unknown but may have been the volcanic islet of Eldey, which is believed to have erupted during the Reykjanes Fires.
- 1227, probably the same event as 1226, overlapping the years; also produced a large amount of pumice.
- 1231, another "sand-winter"; tephra has been attributed to this event.
- 1238
- 1240, an event recorded as having made the skies "red as blood". This implies a sulphur-rich volcanic plume which caused regional atmospheric perturbations, likely resulting from a large effusive basaltic eruption. The most likely candidate for this event is the 8-10 km long Eldvörp crater row north of Svartsengi where the Arnasetursrhaun and Illarhaun lava fields are situated, covering an area of as much as 50 km^{2} (19 sq mi). The fissure may have extended into the sea, as the lava flow continues as far out as 2.7 km and 90 m underwater. The lava flows have been dated to a few years after the Miðaldarlagið fell, and may represent the final event in the Reykjanes Fires.

== New Reykjanes Fires ==
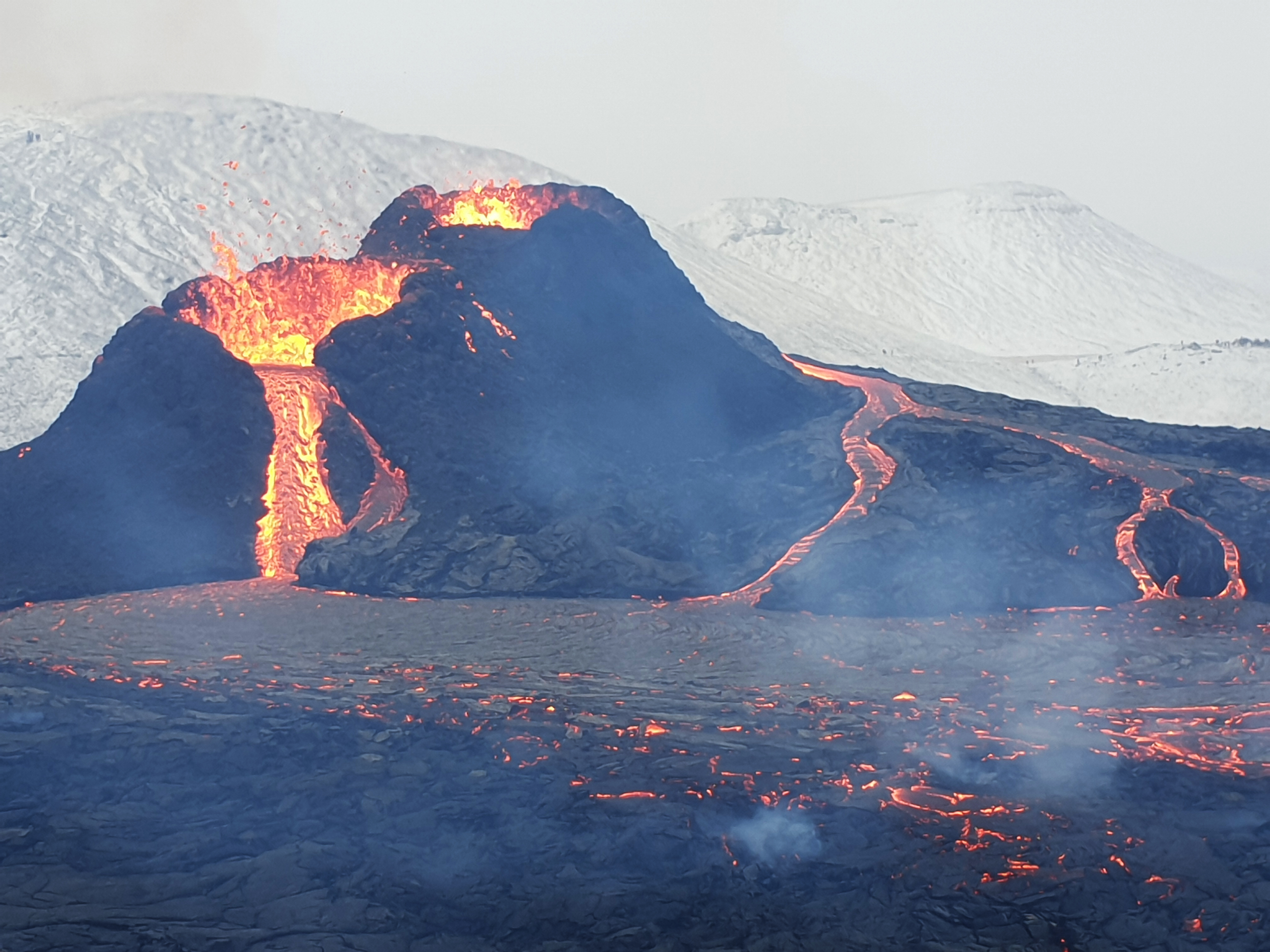
Cinder cone produced by the 2021 Fagradalsfjall eruption

After 800 years of dormancy, a fresh series of eruptions began on the peninsula in 2021. There were three eruptions at Fagradalsfjall in 2021, 2022 and 2023 and as of November 2025 there have been nine eruptions at Sundhnúkur between 2023 and 2025. These have collectively been described as the New Reykjanes Fires in the light of their similarity to the 1210-1240 events:

- Fagradalsfjall:
  - 2021 eruption
  - 2022 eruption
  - 2023 eruption
- Sundhnúkur:
  - December 2023 eruption
  - January 2024 eruption
  - February 2024 eruption
  - March–May 2024 eruption
  - May–June 2024 eruption
  - August–September 2024 eruption
  - November–December 2024 eruption
  - April 2025 eruption
  - July–August 2025 eruption

== See also ==
- Geology of Iceland
  - Geology of Reykjanes Peninsula
  - Geological deformation of Iceland
- List of volcanic eruptions in Iceland
