= Grindavík =

Town in Iceland

Grindavíkurbær
- Municipality
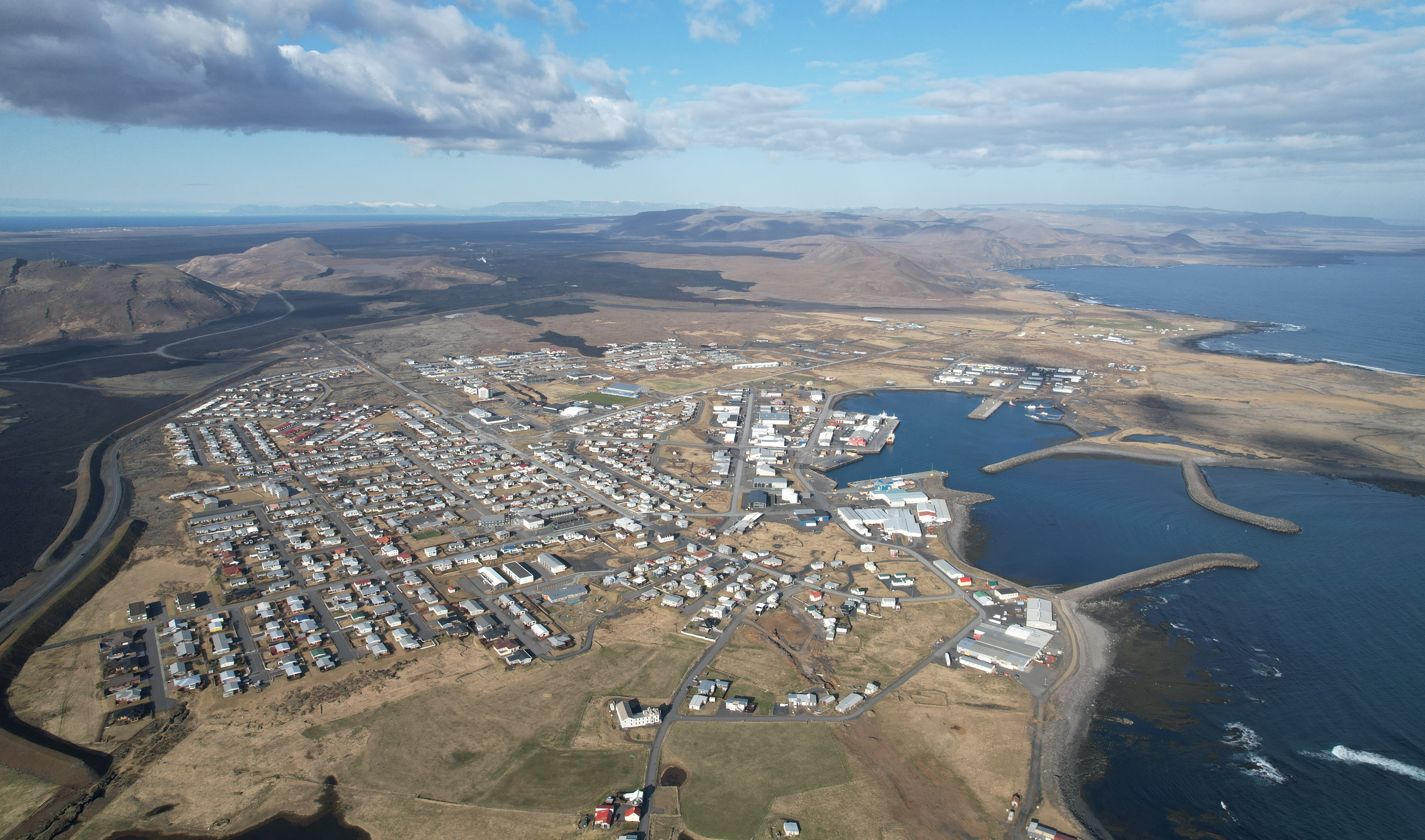
- Aerial view of Grindavík in 2025

- Location of Grindavíkurbær

- Location within Iceland
- Coordinates: 63°50′36″N 22°26′10″W
- Country: Iceland
- Region: Southern Peninsula
- Constituency: South Constituency

Government
  - Mayor: Ásrún Helga Kristinsdóttir

Area
  - Total: 425 km^{2} (164 sq mi)

Population
  - Total: ~3,000 (until 2023); ~100 (2024–present)
  - Density: 6.8/km^{2} (18/sq mi)
- Postal code(s): 240
- Municipal number: 2300
- Website: grindavik.is

Grindavík (Icelandic pronunciation: [ˈkrɪntaˌviːk]) is a fishing town in the Southern Peninsula district of Iceland, located near Þorbjörn.

It is one of the few towns with a harbour on this coast. Most of the inhabitants work in the fishing industry. The Blue Lagoon, Grindavík's première attraction, is located 5 kilometres (3 mi) from the town.

In November 2023, in the midst of escalating and severe seismic activity, a state of emergency was declared and the town evacuated. On 18 December 2023, at around 22:00 local time (GMT), the Sundhnúkur volcano erupted. The eruption was close to Hagafell, about 3 kilometres (2 mi) northeast of Grindavík. A risk was also posed to Svartsengi Power Station. Fountains of lava, up to 100 metres (330 ft) high, could be seen from Iceland's capital, Reykjavík. Authorities said they were highly prepared. The volcano erupted again on 8 February 2024, for the third time since December, this time at the edge of the town, and the lava flow destroyed a few buildings and infrastructure. The residents of Grindavík had remained evacuated. On 20 February, the residents were allowed to return to their homes, but on 2 March, Grindavík was again evacuated because of new seismic activity. On 16 March, a fourth eruption began near the site of the first eruption, which ended on 8 May. A fifth eruption began as a fissure on 29 May, but the eruptive activity quickly localized to a primary edifice in Sundhnúkur crater row, close to the northern edge of Grindavík town. This eruption ended on 22 June.

== History ==
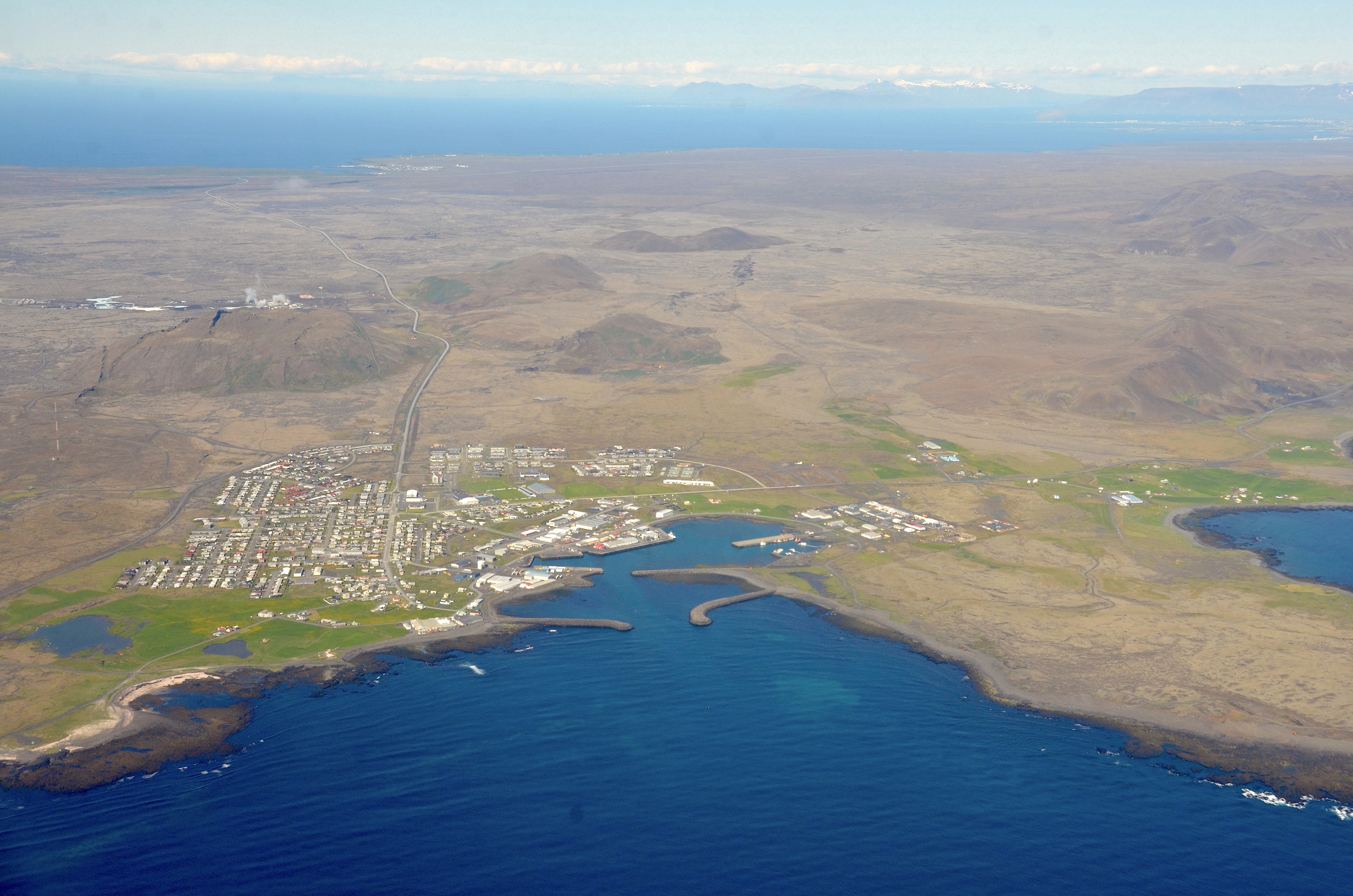
Grindavík from the air in 2022

Landnáma or The Book of Settlements mentions that around 934, two Viking settlers, Molda-Gnúpur Hrólfsson [ˈmɔltaˌknuːpʏr ˈr̥oulsˌsɔːn] and Þórir Haustmyrkur Vígbjóðsson [ˈθouːrɪr ˈhœystˌmɪr̥kʏr ˈviɣˌpjouðsˌsɔːn], arrived in the Reykjanes area. Þórir settled in Selvogur and Krísuvík and Molda-Gnúpur in Grindavík.

The sons of Moldar-Gnúpur established three settlements; Þórkötlustaðahverfi [ˈθour̥ˌkʰœhtlʏˌstaːðaˌkʰvɛrvɪ], Járngerðarstaðarhverfi [ˈjau(r)tnˌcɛrðar̥ˌstaːðar̥ˌkʰvɛrvɪ] and Staðarhverfi [ˈstaːðar̥ˌkʰvɛrvɪ]. The modern version of Grindavík is situated mainly in what was Járngerðarstaðarhverfi.

The town has been an important fishing station since medieval times. In the 13th century its fishing rights were owned by the Bishop of Skálholt, who took payment in stacks of salted cod. It was the scene of fierce disputes between English fishermen and German merchants in the 16th century, leading to 280 Germans storming the ship of John Breye (also known as John the Broad) in 1532 and killing 15 people, including John. The English were subsequently expelled from Iceland.

In June 1627, Grindavík was raided by Barbary Pirates in an event known as the Turkish Abductions. Twelve Icelanders and three Danes, along with two vessels were taken, and with captives taken from other Icelandic settlements, transported into slavery in Salé.

The origins of the municipality can be traced to Einar Einarsson's decision to move there to build and run a shop in 1897. During that time the population was only around 360. Fishing had for centuries been a crucial element in the survival of Grindavík's population, but fishing trips were often dangerous. Men were frequently lost at sea and the catch not always stable. However, when a safer access point to land was created at Hópið [ˈhouːpɪθ] in 1939, fishing conditions changed dramatically. From 1950 serious development in the fishing industry had begun to take place. Grindavík was declared a municipality in 1974.

=== Etymology ===
The name 'Grindavík' combines two Icelandic elements. Vík means a shallow inlet, while grind has the meaning of a gate or gateway – possibly referring to an opening in a fence used to control the movement of livestock. The Book of Settlements mentions Grindavík twice but gives no explanation for the name. "Grind" can furthermore signify a dock – that is, where the boats are stored (in the sea or up on the land), as well as long-finned pilot whale, and in the old language any small whale, suggesting that the settlers may have found whales in the area.

== Geography and geology ==
Grindavík is situated on the far south-western part of the Reykjanes Peninsula. The town stands on a lava field that erupted up to about 2,350 years ago from the Sundhnúkur crater chain just north of Grindavík, as well as from the Svartsengisfell volcanoes and fissures on Stora Skogsfell, both nearby. The town is one of six communities on the peninsula that is situated on or near an eruptive fissure.

Grindavík's harbour, called Hópið, was created by an eruption from Sundhnúkur approximately 2,800 years ago that created a peninsula south-east of where the town stands, 2 km (1.2 mi) long by 1 km (0.62 mi) wide, known as Hópsnes on the west side and Þórkötlustaðanes on the east side. A lighthouse, built in 1928, stands on the southern tip. The town's fishing industry originally operated from huts on Þórkötlustaðanes before moving to Grindavík harbour in 1939 after local residents dug a channel through a reef to connect Hópið to the sea.

=== 2023–25 volcanic eruptions ===
On 25 October 2023, an earthquake swarm started north of Grindavík and escalated over the next few days. A state of emergency was issued on 10 November 2023 as continued earthquakes – by then numbering over 22,000 since 25 October – signalled a potentially impending volcanic eruption. Inhabitants were ordered to evacuate on the evening of 10 November 2023, after a magmatic intrusion was suspected to have formed beneath the town. This occurred following weeks of recorded uplift and seismic unrest north of the town, near the Blue Lagoon. Between midnight and 2 p.m. on 10 November 2023, almost 800 earthquakes were recorded, with the shallowest occurring at depths ranging from 3 to 3.5 kilometres (1.9 to 2.2 mi), as reported by the Icelandic Meteorological Office.

The Icelandic Civil Protection Agency released statements expressing concerns that a magma dike under formation could extend towards Grindavík. Press photographs from Grindavík on 11 November showed the extent of damage to roads, and the golf course, due to fault movements caused by the activity. On 18 December, a volcanic eruption north of Grindavík by Hagafell prompted the evacuation of the town.

On the morning of 14 January 2024 at 8:00 local time, a volcanic fissure erupted 450 metres (0.28 mi) from the town, followed by a second fissure opening around noon. Lava from the eruptions flowed into the town, breaching defensive barriers and destroying three houses. Civilians were not endangered by the volcanic activity as they had already been evacuated overnight due to a series of earthquakes.

On 9 February 2024, the Icelandic government published a bill to offer to buy residential property owned by individuals in Grindavík, and to take over housing loans on residential property in the town.

On the morning of 1 April 2025, another volcanic eruption began which prompted another evacuation of the town. A further eruption occurred at 4am on Wednesday, 16 July 2025 after its precursor seismic activity caused what transpired to be temporary evacuations locally.

== Activities ==
Grindavík harbour

A short distance to the north, there is the Blue Lagoon (Icelandic: Bláa Lónið), a geothermal spa using hot and mineralized waters from the nearby Svartsengi power station.

Ungmennafélag Grindavíkur (Umfg) is the town's sport club, and the town contains the Grindavíkurvöllur stadium.

The Leif the Lucky Bridge spans the Álfagjá rift valley [ˈaulvaˌcauː] that marks the boundary of the Eurasian and North American continental tectonic plates. It was built in 2002 and named in honour of Icelandic explorer Leif Erikson, who travelled from Europe to explore North America 500 years before Columbus.

The Icelandic Saltfish Museum in Grindavík opened in 2002. It displays the story of salt fish production and its importance for the Icelandic economy throughout the centuries in a specially designed building of 650 square metres (7,000 sq ft).

=== Sports ===
Grindavík has a football team and a basketball team.

== Notable residents ==
The Icelandic writer Guðbergur Bergsson was born here, and Kalli Bjarni, the first winner of the Icelandic version of Pop Idol, lives in the town. The Spanish publisher and writer Jaime Salinas Bonmatí, engaged to Guðbergur Bergsson, lived, died and is buried here. Icelandic footballer Alfreð Finnbogason was also born in Grindavík.

Former Manchester United footballer, Lee Sharpe, had a spell with Grindavík football club, at the end of his career in 2003.

== United States Naval communication facility ==
Near Grindavík, the United States Navy has operated the 1049 acre Naval Radio Transmitter Facility Grindavik since the mid-1970s. It uses several antennas, including two guyed masts. The mast situated at 63°51′1″N 22°28′0″W was built in 1993 and is 304.8 metres (1,000 ft) tall. The other mast at 63°51′3″N 22°27′6″W was built in 1983 and is 182.9 metres (600 ft) tall. The taller mast replaced a 243.8 metres (800 ft) mast, and the second replaced a mast of the same height.

== Twin towns – sister cities ==
Grindavík is twinned with:

- Ílhavo, Portugal
- Jonzac, France
- Penistone, United Kingdom
- Piteå, Sweden
- Rovaniemi, Finland
- Uniejów, Poland

== See also ==
- List of cities and towns in Iceland
- Geothermal power in Iceland
- Reykjanes
