= Svartsengi power station =

Geothermal power station in Iceland

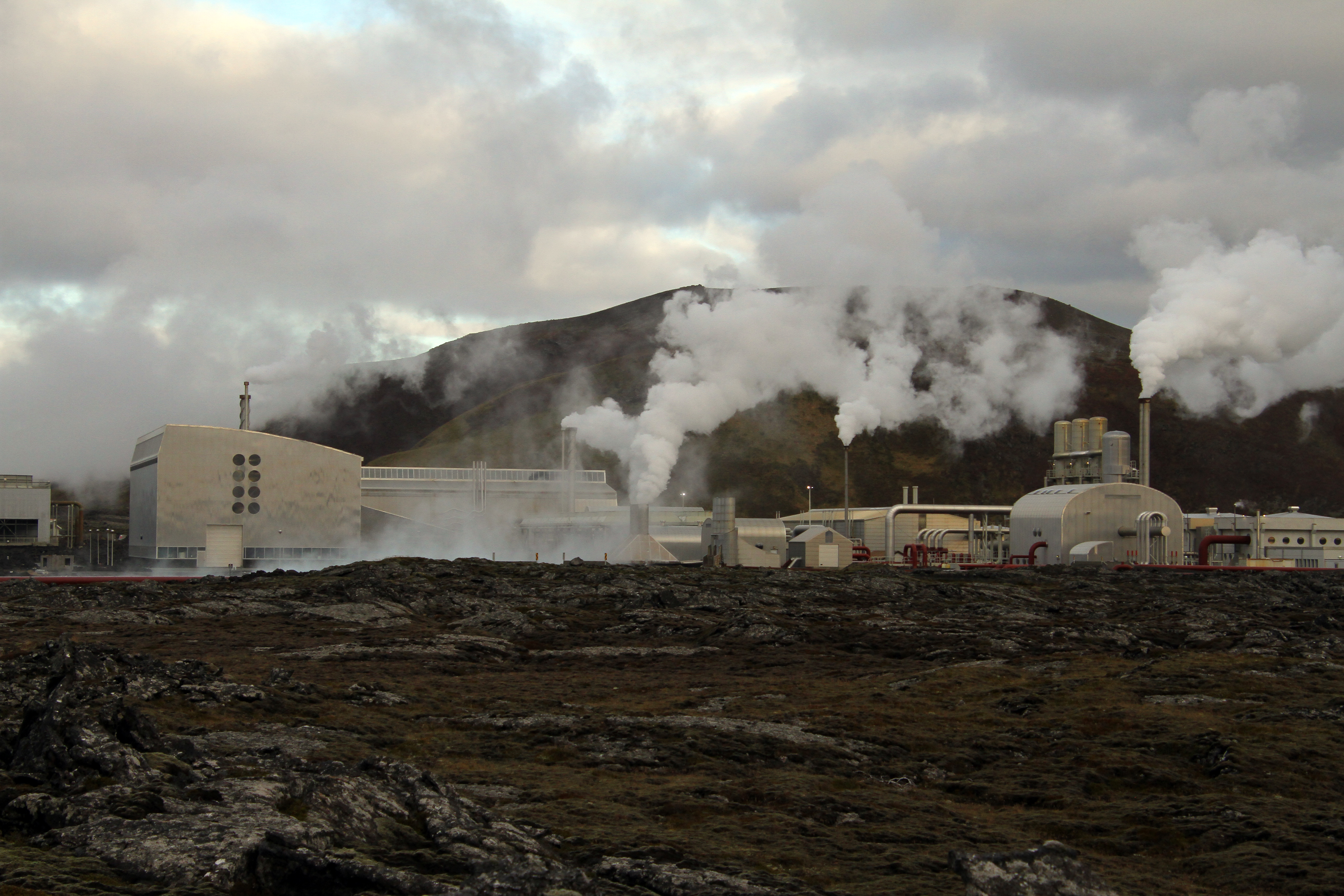
- Svartsengi power station
- Country: Iceland
- Location: Keflavík
- Coordinates: 63°52′43″N 22°25′58″W
- Status: Operational
- Commission date: 1976–2008
- Owner: HS Orka

Geothermal power station
- Type: 5 shallow steam wells 8 steam and brine wells 150 ha (370 acres)
- Min. source temp.: 101 °C (210 °F)
- Wells: 13
- Max. well depth: 1,800 m (5,900 ft)
- Cogeneration?: yes

Power generation
- Units operational: 2 × 1 MW; 1 × 6 MW; 7 × 1.2 MW; 2 × 30 MW
- Nameplate capacity: 74.4 MW

External links
- Website: https://www.hsorka.is/en/about-hs-orka/the-business/orkuver/svartsengi-power-plant/
- Commons: Related media on Commons

Svartsengi power station (Svartsengi (Icelandic pronunciation: [ˈsvar̥(t)sˌeiɲcɪ]); "black meadow" in Icelandic) is a geothermal power plant, which is located in the Svartsengi geothermal field, about 4 kilometres (2.5 mi) north of Grindavík, approximately 20 km (12 mi) SE of Keflavík International Airport and 45 km (28 mi) from Reykjavík. The electric power station was built in 1976 by HS Orka. It was the world's first combined geothermal power plant for electric power generation and hot water production for district heating.

The power station, which consists of an area of 150 ha (370 acres), was constructed in six sequent phases (completed in 2008), in each phase they built a new power plant, so the generation capacity increased to 150 MWth for the district heating and the nameplate capacity to 75 MW for electricity power.

Svartsengi power station provides hot water for the district heating system of the entire Reykjanes Peninsula, including Keflavík, Njarðvík, Vogar, Garður, Sandgerði and Grindavík – more than 21,000 households. It is therefore considered one of the most important heating plants in Iceland. It is connected to the wider Icelandic electrical grid through Reykjavík.

Svartsengi has also produced spin-offs; one of these side products is one of Iceland's most popular bathing resorts, the Blue Lagoon, and another is the first renewable methanol plant, Carbon Recycling International.

== Geothermal power station details ==
In the beginning of 1976, Svartsengi power station was completely liquid-dominated, but it changed into a liquid dominated with a steam cap geothermal system.

Today, it consists of 13 production boreholes connected to the six plants, eight of those wells are producing a mixture of steam and brine and the other five are shallow dry steam wells.

It also possesses one of the largest supervisory control and data acquisition (SCADA) systems in Iceland, with P-CIM monitors and 50 substations, which include hot water / cold water / electricity distribution systems and 11 turbines and generators.

== Power plant units ==
Nowadays, the combined capacity of Svartsengi power station is 75 MW in electrical power and 150 MW in thermal power.

Energy Plant 1, with its two back-pressure turbines of 1 MW each, was constructed in 1977–1979. It consisted of four thermal energy circuits, which produced 40 L/s of heating water and 50 MW electricity for its own power needs, but today it is mostly out of action and only two circuits are in use, so the produced capacity is 25 MW of thermal power.

Energy Plant 2 was built in 1980 and it produces, with its three thermal energy exchange systems, 225 L/s (3 × 75 L/s) of 90 °C (194 °F) hot water and 75 MW (3 × 25 MW) of thermal power.

Energy Plant 3, with its 6 MW counter-pressure steam turbines, is especially used for producing electricity. Each second 40 kg of 160 °C (320 °F) steam passes through the turbines with 5 bar pressure.

Energy Plant 4, with its seven 1.2 MW Isopentan Ormat turbines, was built in 1989–1992 to produce power with 105 °C (221 °F) hot excess steam and low pressure steam from the other power plants.

Energy Plant 5 was built in 1999 to substitute the old energy plant 1 and to increase the power and hot water, so the demand could be met. It produces with its 30 MW turbines and 75 MW thermal energy exchange system, around 225 GWh per annum.

Energy Plant 6 is a condenser plant with unique high pressure steam turbines and a total capacity of 30 MW. It produces only electricity, which is interdependent on the use of the other district heating and electrical plants as some of the intake can be from them.

== 2023–2024 earthquakes and eruptions ==
The 2023–2025 Sundhnúkur eruptions caused major disruption to the power station, which was threatened by swarms of earthquakes and repeated lava flows in its near vicinity. The power station was switched to remote operation but suffered minimal damage from the earthquakes.

Pressure readings from boreholes associated with the power station have proved to be useful in giving minutes warning at least of the eruptions.

However, the main road leading to Svartsengi was engulfed by lava on 8 February 2024 and a section of the hot water pipe leading from it was also destroyed, leading to a heating crisis in parts of the peninsula for a few days until a new pipeline was connected. In response to the threat of lava flows, the Icelandic parliament authorised the construction of protective earth barriers around the power station and the Blue Lagoon, which were largely in place by the time of the 8 February eruption. In June 2024, a small flow of a'a lava overflowed the berms, required additional berm construction and the first use of water to slow lava flows since the 1973 Eldfell eruption. The water cooling capacity was subsequently increased. Both an increase in height of the barriers and water cooling strategies had to be applied, in attempts to protect local infrastructure including the power station, in later eruptions.

As of December 2024 efforts were underway to increase the height of the barriers by a further 4 to 6 m (13 to 20 ft) at an extra cost of up to ISK 1.25 billion (US$10,900,000) on top of the ISK 10 billion (US$72,000,000) already spent on barriers during the current series of eruptions.

== Future plans ==
Construction of an extension called Svartsengi 7 (SVA7, Energy Plant 7) that will replace two older power units, renovate some of the hot water production equipment and increase power capacity by about a third commenced in 2022.

== See also ==
- Geothermal power in Iceland
- List of largest power stations in the world
- Renewable energy in Iceland
- List of power stations in Iceland
