= Sundhnúkur =

Active volcano in Iceland

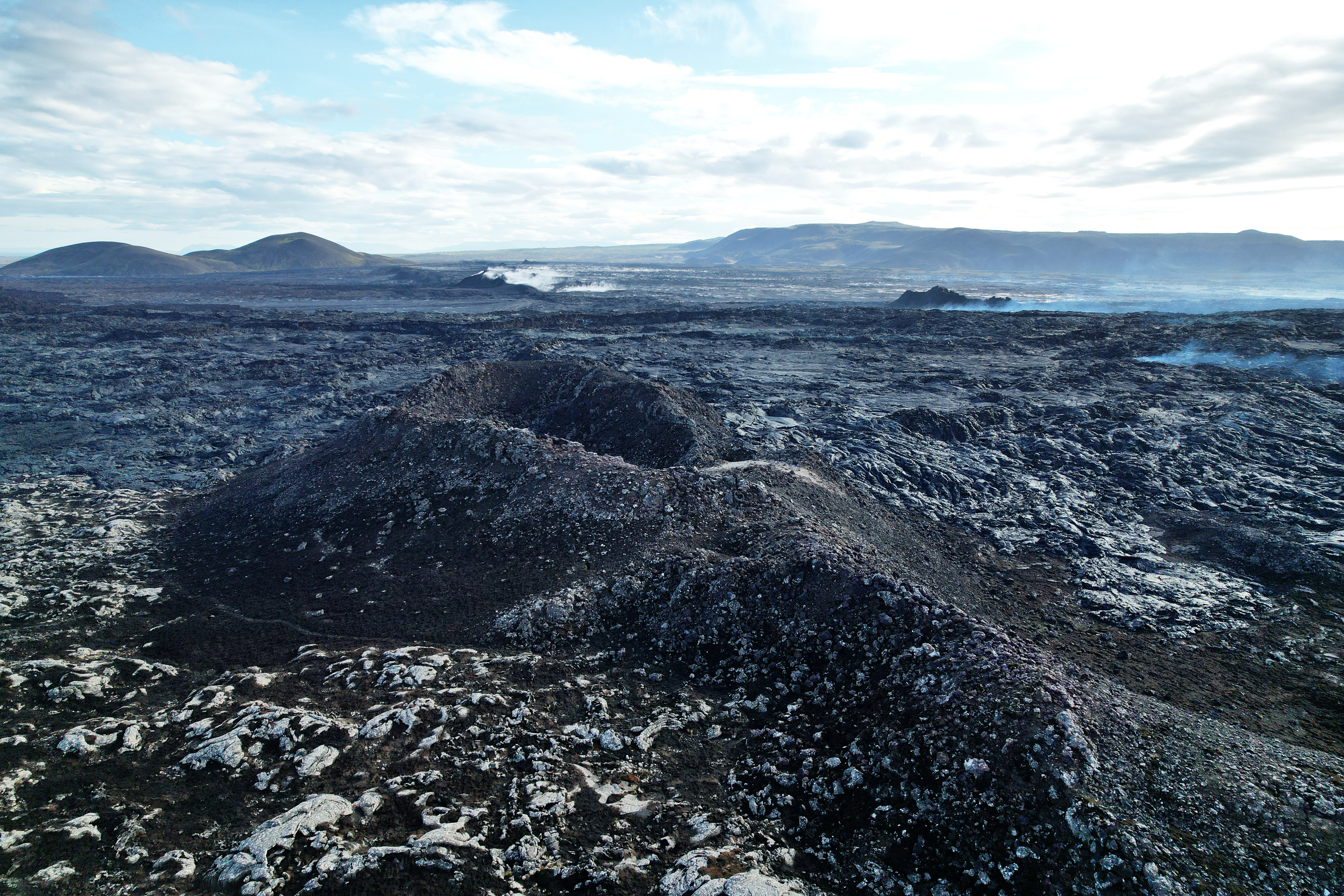
- Sundhnúkur with recent lava in the background

Highest point
- Elevation: 134 m (440 ft)
- Coordinates: 63°52′25″N 22°23′50″W

Geography
- Location within Iceland
- Location: Iceland

Geology
- Mountain type: volcanic hill
- Last eruption: 2023–2025

Sundhnúkur (Icelandic pronunciation: [ˈsʏntˌn̥uːkʏr̥]) is a volcanic hill, within its associated Sundhnúksgígar crater row and volcanic fissures (Sundhnúksgígaröðin [ˈsʏntˌn̥uksˌciːɣaˌrœːðɪn]) in the Svartsengi volcanic system, part of the Reykjanes Peninsula rift zone of Iceland. It is the location of the 2023–2025 Sundhnúkur eruptions.

== Geology ==
The region has basalt lava shields with the larger ones being tholeiitic and smaller ones being picritic or tholeiitic. The hills are hyaloclastite table mountains or ridges and pillow lava mounds. The previous lava eruption from the Sundhnúkur crater row has been dated at 2350±90 BP, and was of basaltic ʻaʻā type. The lava field that erupted prior to 2023 extends north-east from Grindavík in the south with the fissures and Sundhnúksgígar crater row extending 8.3 km (5.2 mi) at strike of 35°. This takes the fissure system past the older mountains of Hagafell to its east and Svartsengisfell to its west. The crater row is usually now classified as part of the Eldvörp–Svartsengi or Svartsengi volcanic system which is part of the Reykjanes volcanic belt. There are previous classifications that included the volcano in the Reykjanes volcanic system and what was termed the Grindavik volcanic fissure system.

== 18 December 2023 eruption ==
On the evening of 18 December 2023, a volcanic eruption occurred at Sundhnúksgígaröð north of Grindavík, with images showing lava spewing from fissures in the ground. The intensity of the eruption and accompanying seismic activity which preceded it decreased early on 19 December, with lava seen spreading laterally from both sides of the newly opened fissures.

Iceland's Meteorological Office said the eruption occurred at around 22:17 GMT following a series of small earthquakes at around 21:00. It pinpointed the origin of the eruption near Hagafell, about 4 km (2.5 mi) north-east of Grindavík, and noted that the eruption stemmed from a fissure with a length of about 3.5 km (2.2 mi), with lava flowing at a rate of around 100 to 200 cubic metres per second, adding that seismic activity appeared to be moving towards the direction of Grindavík. An Icelandic Civil Defence official told the public broadcaster RÚV that the eruption had happened quickly and appeared to be "quite a large event". The eruption was described as the largest in the area since the beginning of activity in 2021, and was visible as far away as the capital Reykjavík, 42 km (26 mi) away.

By 19 December, the scent of smoke and ash was detected as far as 30 km (19 mi) from the eruption site, raising fears that volcanic gases could reach Reykjavík by the next day.

== Further eruptions ==
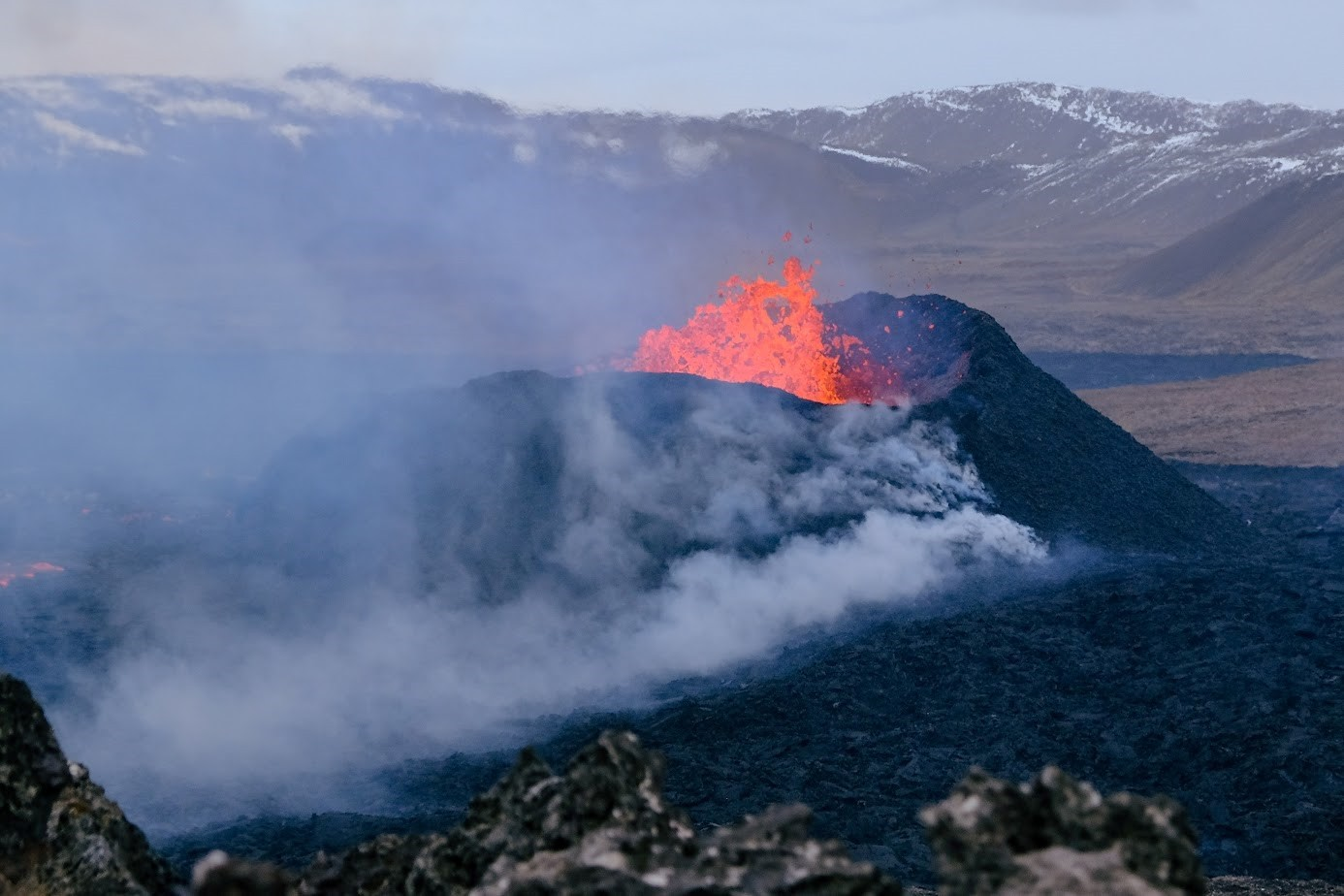
A picture from the eruption on 16 March, note the singular spatter cone/vent. Photo taken from Hagafell.

The eruptions continued into 2024. An eruption started on 14 January 2024, lasting two days, with property damage, including to the town of Grindavík. The next eruption commenced on 8 February 2024, and finished the next day with road and hot water supply infrastructure damage. Another eruption began on 16 March 2024 that lasted for an unusually long period of time. The eruption was initially a row of fissures, but has since then been confined to 1 crater.

As of 25 April 2024, land uplift resumed after almost stopping at the start on the 16 March eruption. The eruption finished on 9 May.

In the interlude between the 16 March and 29 May eruptions, land uplift occurred.

At 12:45:58 UTC on 29 May, the fissure had its fifth eruption that petered out (but did not completely stop) over the course of 24 hours. Its fifth eruption has been the one of this sequence with the most volcanic ash released as of 1 June 2024 due to contact with groundwater that has accumulated from rain. The amount of available magma was estimated to be around 20 million cubic metres. The fifth eruption ceased on 22 June and afterward inflow continued into the magma reservoir.

At 21:26 UTC on 22 August a fissure erupted to the north of the previous eruptions, in what transpired by the time it ended on 5 September, to be the largest eruption of the series, with lava subsequently spreading over an area known to have old American munitions.

The second largest eruption of the series occurred between 20 November and 9 December 2024.

The 8th brief eruption commenced just before 9:45 UTC 1 April 2025, lasted 6 hours and covered about 0.23 km^{2} (0.089 sq mi) to an average thickness of 1.7 m (5 ft 7 in) in lava.

The 9th eruption commenced on 16 July 2025 at 3:54 UTC, and finished on the 4 August 2025.

== See also ==
- Geography of Iceland
  - Southern Peninsula (Iceland)
- Geology of Iceland
  - Geology of Reykjanes Peninsula
- Volcanism of Iceland
