= Sky Lagoon =

Hot spring spa

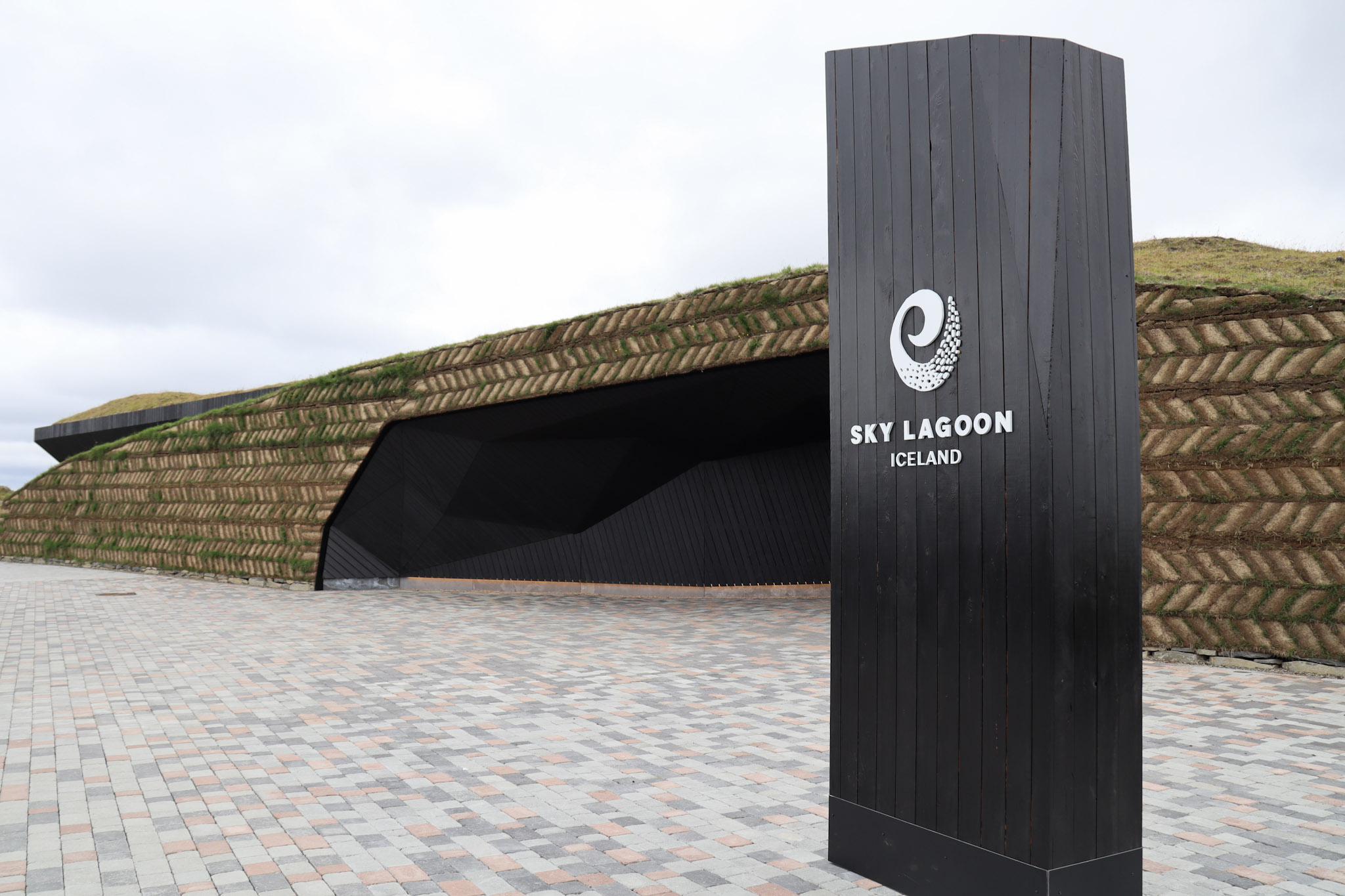
- Exterior of Sky Lagoon with sign and turf wall
- Interactive map of Sky Lagoon
- Location: Kársnes Harbour, Kópavogur, Iceland
- Coordinates: 64°06′59″N 21°56′56″W
- Spring source: superheated groundwater
- Type: geothermal
- Temperature: range from 38°C to 40°C

Sky Lagoon is a geothermal spa in southwestern Iceland. It is located at Kársnes Harbour, Kópavogur,

== Description ==
Sky Lagoon is primarily heated by geothermal energy. Natural hot water that comes from a great depth below the Earth's surface feeds the geothermal pool, which keeps the water temperature at approximately 38 to 40 °C (100 to 104 °F). Snæfellsjökull (a glacier-capped volcano) and Keilir mountain are visible from Sky Lagoon.

The spa is a competitor of the nearby Blue Lagoon.

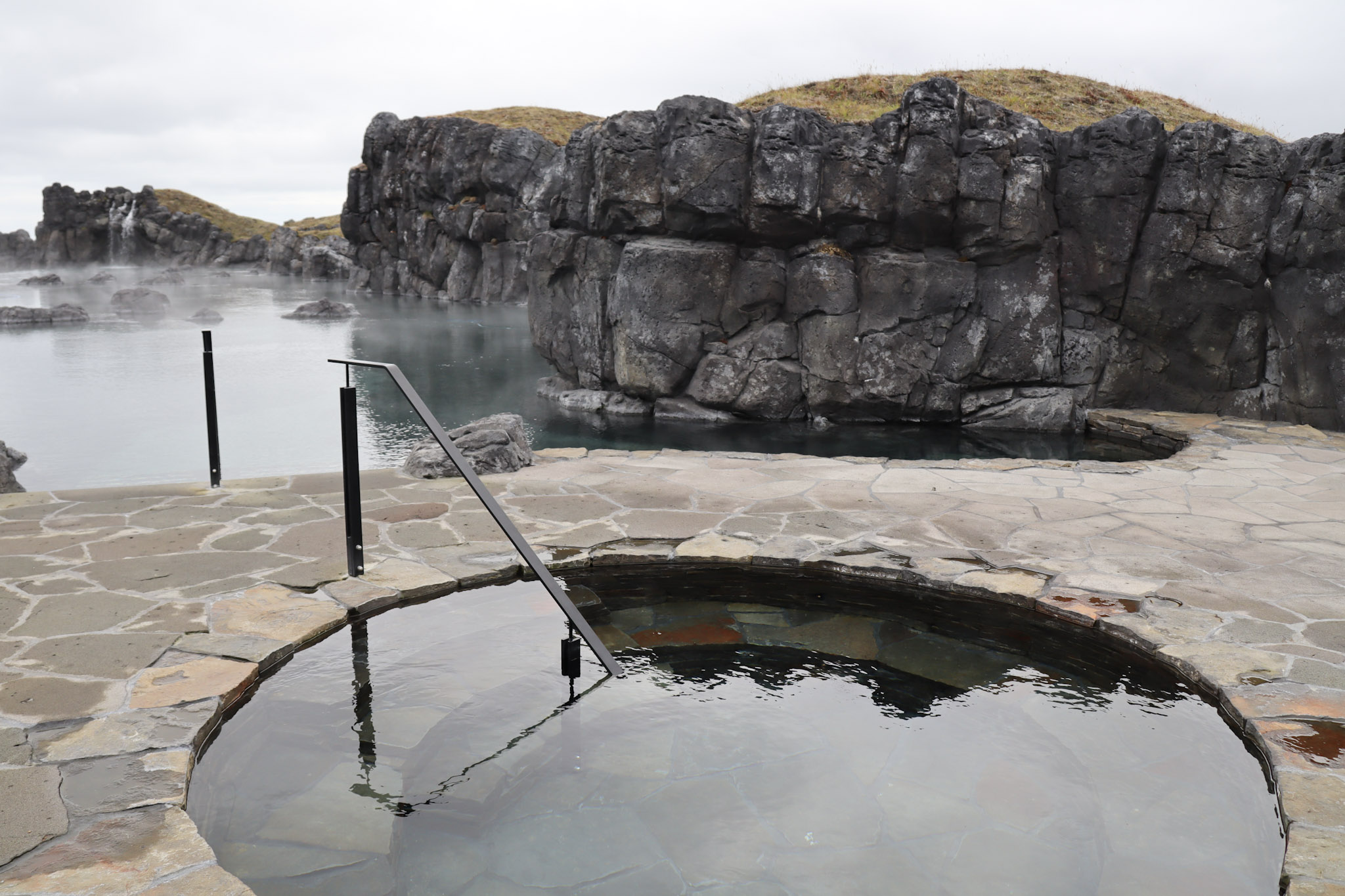
Cold plunge pool with lagoon and rocks in background

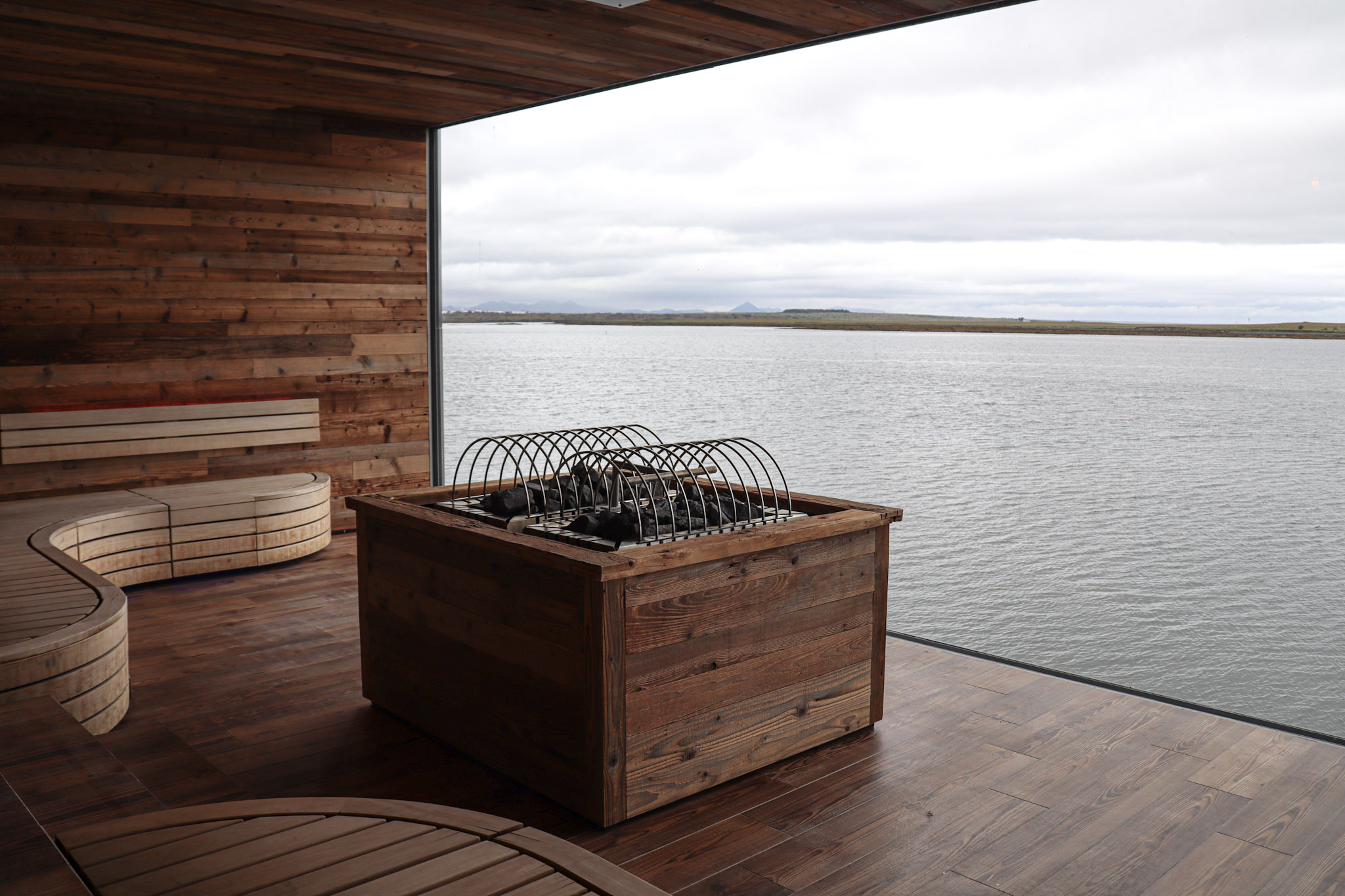
Sky Lagoon sauna with view of ocean

== History ==
Construction of Sky Lagoon began in early 2020 and was completed in 2021. The design was inspired by the Icelandic geography and uses grey-blues, deep greens, whites and creams to copy the landscape.

Some elements of Sky Lagoon were inspired by Icelandic nature and heritage, such as the turfhouse, turf walls and plunge pool. Elements of the facility include a cave tunnel entrance to a hot springs soaking pool and a cold plunge.
