= Helgafell =

Helgafell may refer to:

- Helgafell (Hafnarfjörður), a mountain 338 m (1,109 ft), on the Reykjanes peninsula, south-west Iceland
- Helgafell, a mountain 217 m (712 ft), in Mosfellsbær north-east of Reykjavík
- Helgafell, a mountain at 362 m (1,188 ft), in Rangárþing eystra, south-central Iceland
- Helgafell (Vestmannaeyjabær), a volcano 227 m (745 ft) on the island of Heimaey, south-east Iceland
- Helgafell (Sveitarfélagið Stykkishólmur), a hill 73 m (240 ft), in Snæfellsnes, western Iceland
- Helgafell, a mountain at 549 m (1,801 ft), in Ísafjarðarbær, north-west Iceland
- Helgafell, a mountain at 301 m (988 ft), in Húnaþing vestra, north-west Iceland
- Helgafell, a mountain at 460 m (1,510 ft), in Langanesbyggð, north-east Iceland
