= Geology of Reykjanes Peninsula =

Volcanic area of Iceland

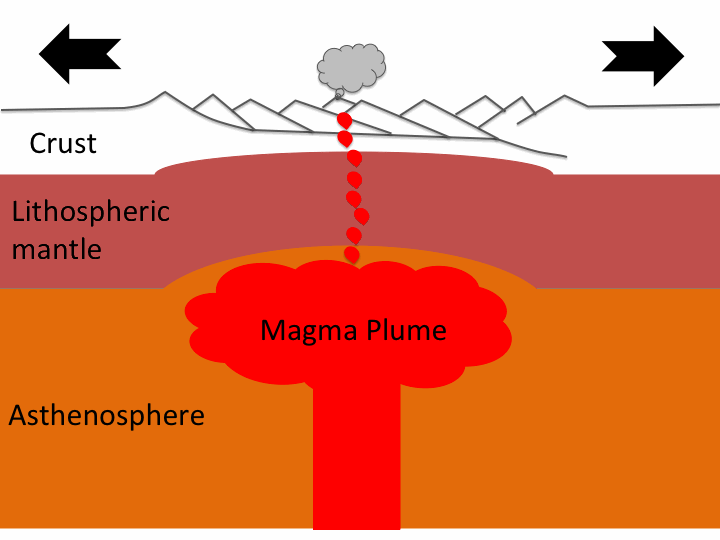
Rifting and hot spot activity in Iceland

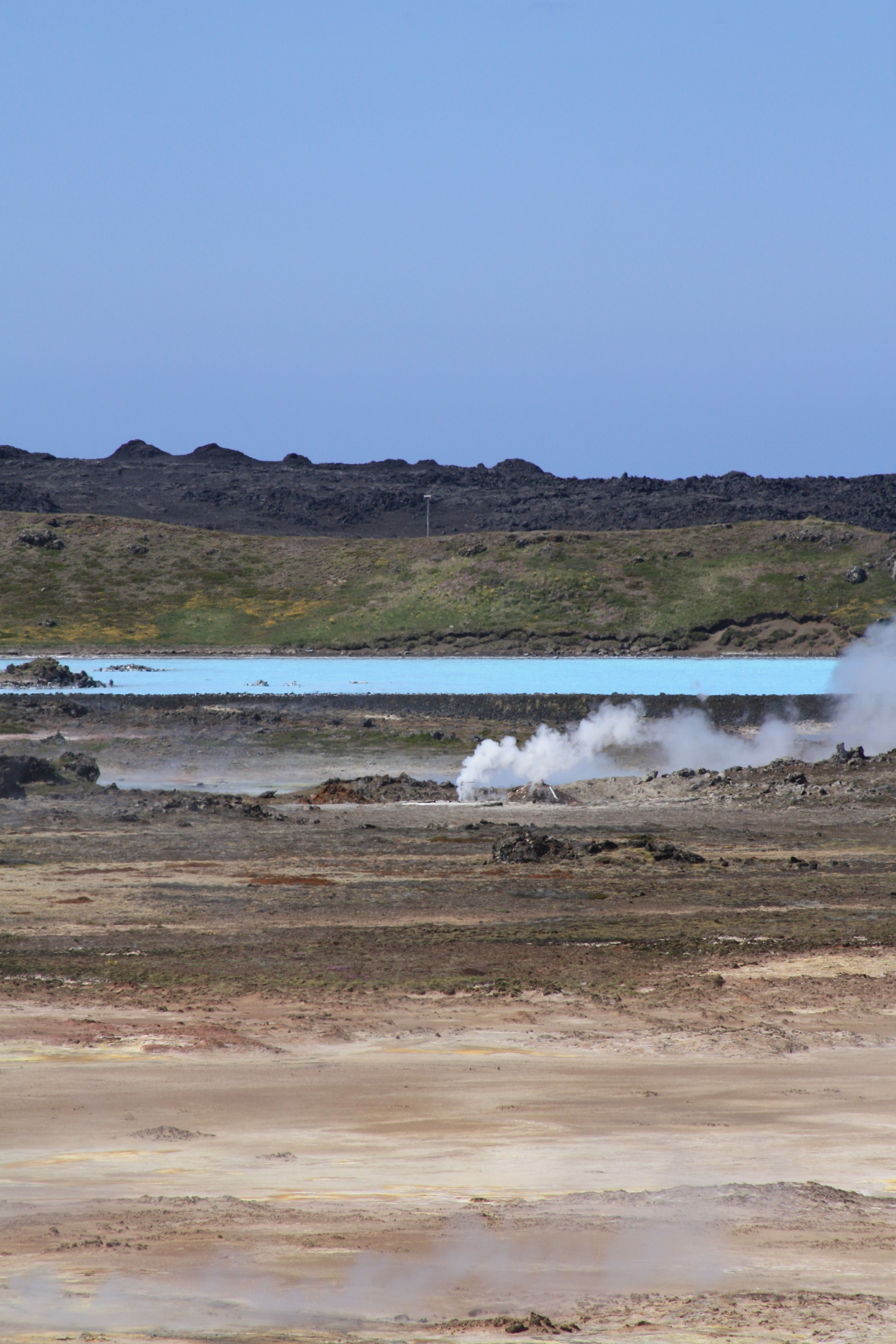
Volcanism at Reykjanes Peninsula: Craters and lavas from the 13th century, acidic lake from geothermal power station, steam vents and hydrothermal alteration (Reykjanes volcanic system)

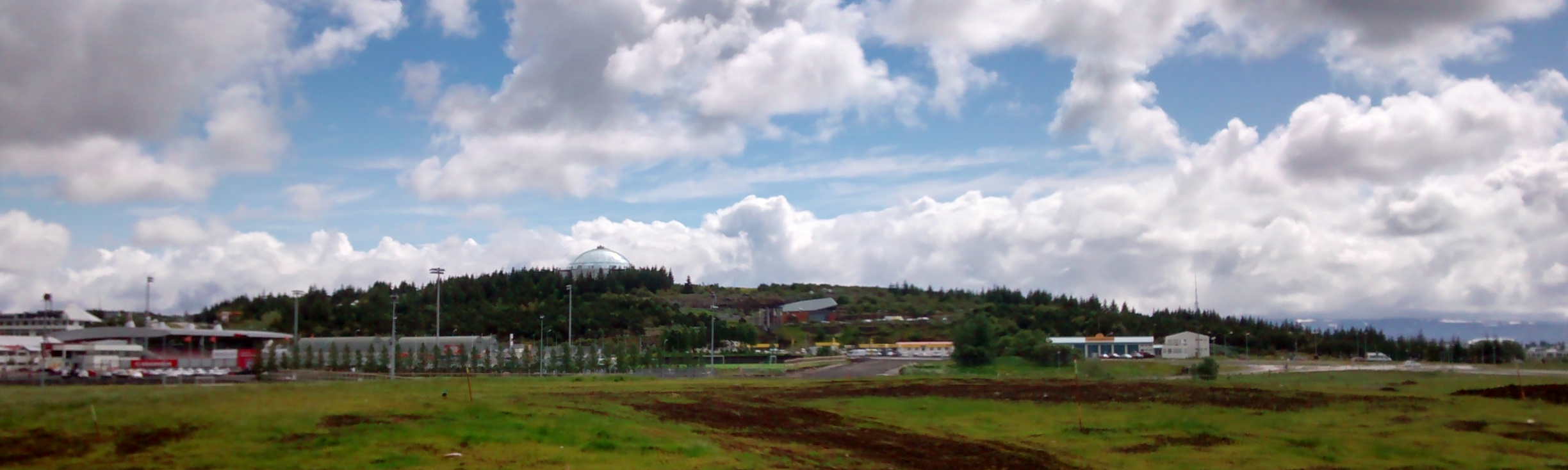
Öskjuhlíð

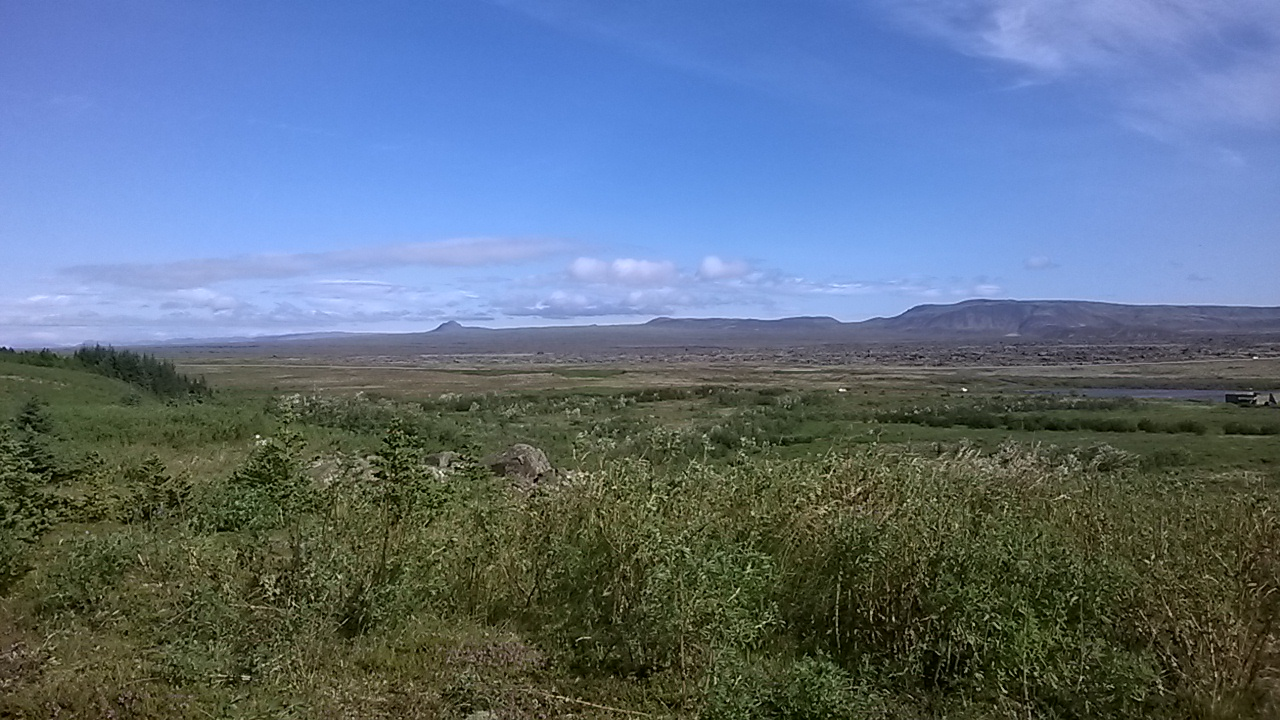
Þráinskjöldur displaying its very gentle slope with Keilir and mountains of the Krýsuvík Volcanic System

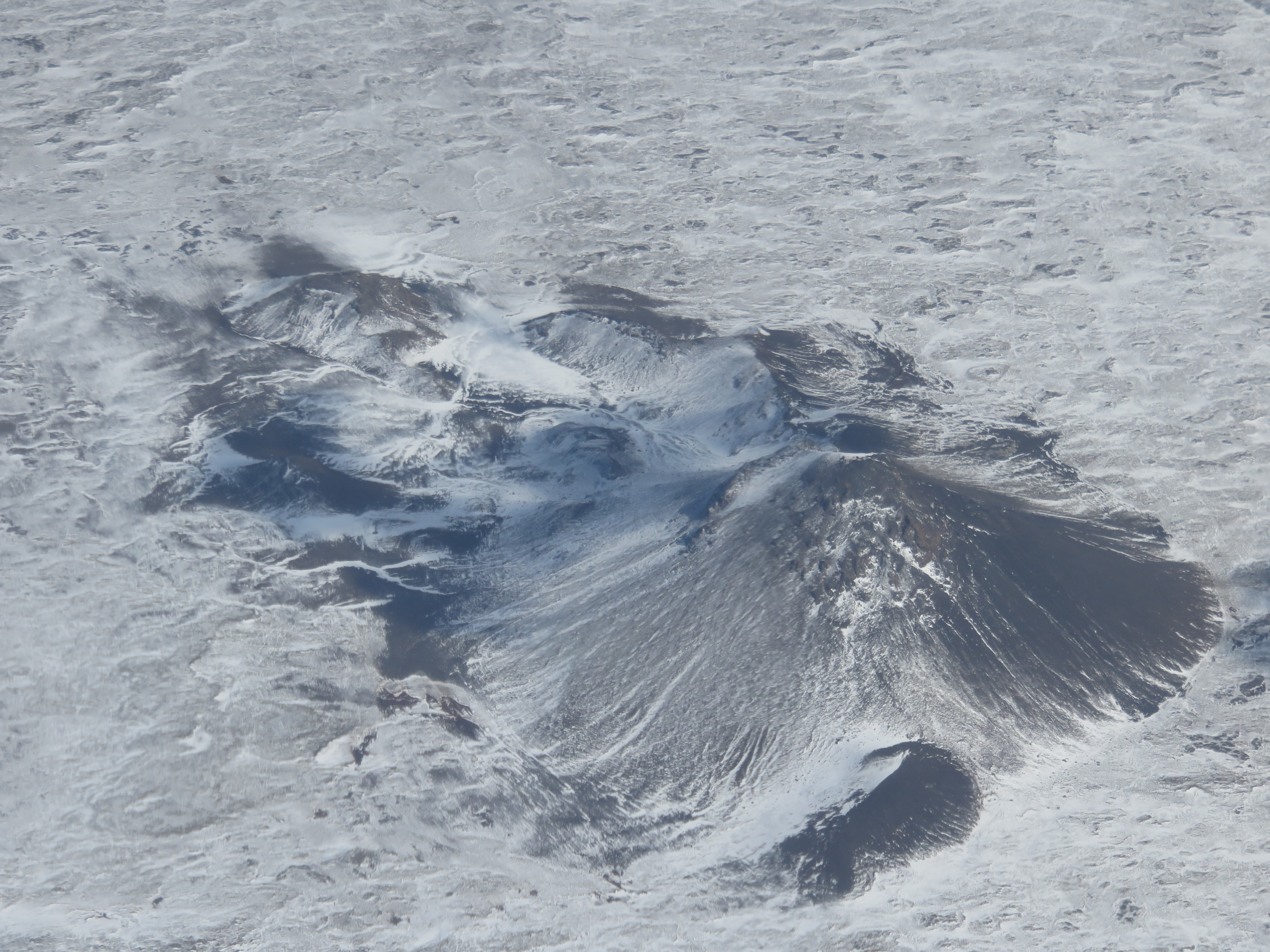
Keilir subglacial cone, surrounded by lavas and other volcanic landforms of Holocene shield volcano Þráinskjóldur as well as fissures and faults

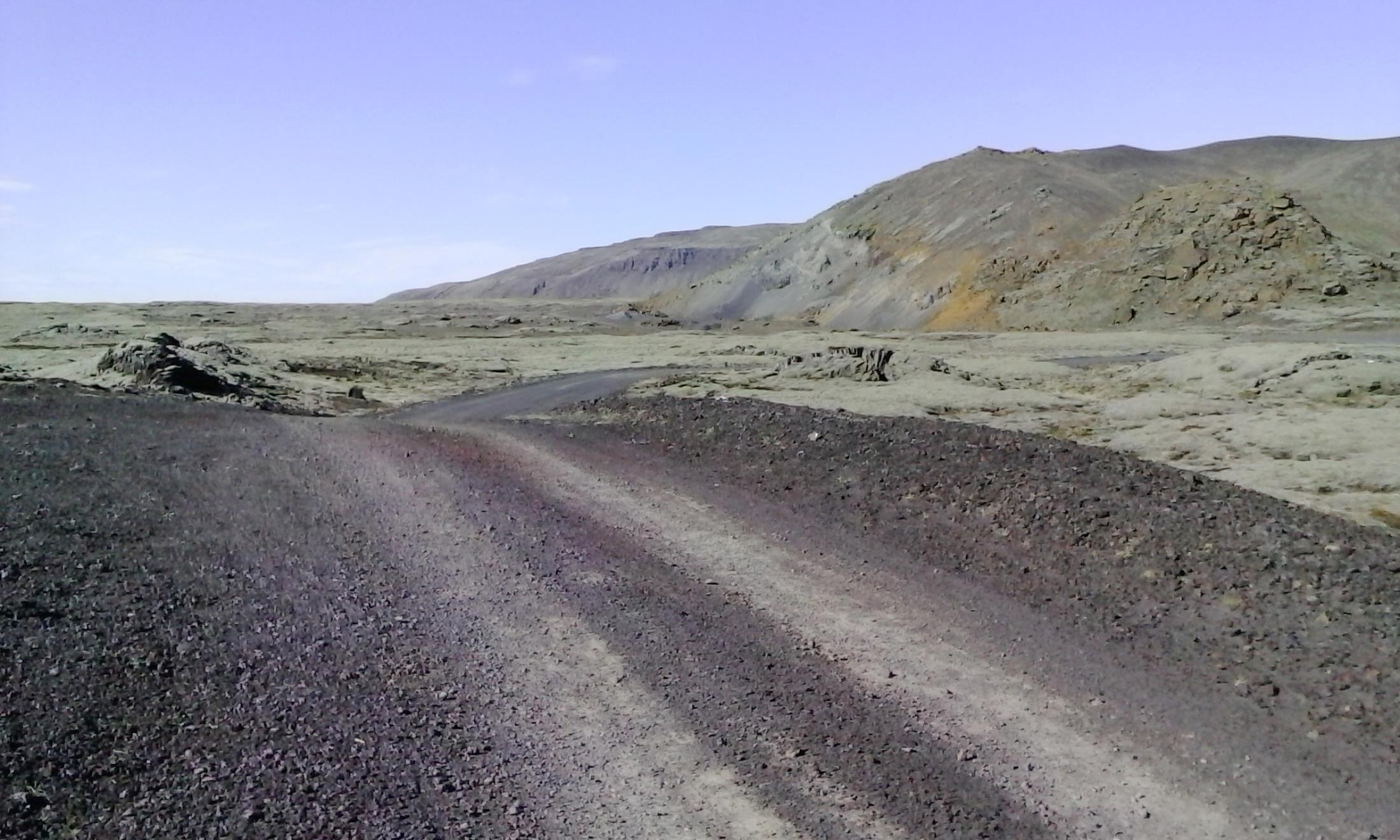
Other subglacial volcanoes on Reykjanes Peninsula: Litla Sandfell with tuya Geitafell (Brennisteinsfjöll) behind

The Reykjanes Peninsula (Icelandic: Reykjanesskagi [ˈreiːcaˌnɛːsˌskaijɪ]) in southwest Iceland is the continuation of the mostly submarine Reykjanes Ridge, a part of the Mid-Atlantic Ridge, on land and reaching from Esja in the north and Hengill in the east to Reykjanestá in the west. Suðurnes (transl. Southern Peninsula) is an administrative unit covering part of Reykjanes Peninsula.

A great deal of volcanic activity was occurring in the Reykjanes Peninsula in 2020 and into 2024, after nearly 800 years of inactivity. After the eruption of the Fagradalsfjall volcano on 19 March 2021, National Geographic's experts predicted that this "may mark the start of decades of volcanic activity". The eruption was small leading to a prediction that this volcano was unlikely to threaten "any population centers".

== Origin ==
The two most important factors for the existence of Iceland, rifting in combination with the Iceland hotspot, were responsible for the existence of Reykjanesskagi. Reykjanes Peninsula originated in a so-called rift jump 6-7 million years ago. At this time, the Snæfellsnes-Skagi rift had drifted so far to the west and away from the presumed steady place hot spot, that activity shifted eastwards in direction of this mantle plume which is now thought to be situated under the big glacier shield of Vatnajökull. Outcropping rocks have ages from 3.2 million years to the present.

== Volcanism and glaciations ==
The topography of Reykjanes Peninsula was formed by glaciers and volcanism, basaltic lava fields covering a good part of the peninsula, in between volcanoes of subglacial as well as subaerial origin, namely tuyas, hyaloclastic ridges (tindars), shield volcanoes and crater rows. Some volcanic systems are submarine, so that there is a pronounced continuation between the volcanism of Reykjanes Ridge, a part of the Mid-Atlantic Ridge, and the Reykjanes Peninsula.

=== Reykjavík region ===
Famous in the area of Reykjavík is the Grágrýti ([ˈkrauːˌkriːtɪ], Gray Lava). These tertiary basalt lava layers cover much of the ground around and under Reykjavík, but their origin is unknown. It is thought that the small hills within the city, some of which were islands during periods of glaciation, could be small shield volcanoes from warm spells of the glaciations. But it is known that during the Plio-Pleistocene (from 3.2 – 1.8 million years BP) two central volcanoes were active in the Reykjavík region, Viðey volcano and Stardals volcano. Both volcanoes partially formed Esja and the smaller mountains near Reykjavík and the hills on the islands and small peninsulas like Viðey and Kjarlarnes. Volcanic and glacial sediments outcrop at some places around Reykjavík, especially in Fossvogur.

=== Subglacial volcanoes ===
Iceland was heavily ice covered during the glaciations and even completely ice covered during parts of them. As a result, there are hundreds of subglacially formed volcanoes on Iceland. On Reykjanes Peninsula, glaciers were present until around 15,000 to 12,000 years ago. Most subglacial edifices are thought to be Weichselian, with a few being older.

The subglacial volcanoes can be identified according to type as tuyas (bigger edifices whose upper parts are covered by the products of subaerial eruptions), hyaloclastite ridges (also called tindars) which means elongated subglacially formed volcanic edifices of different sizes, and cone-like subglacial mounds (very rare). There are many hyaloclastite ridges, with most consisting of mixtures of pillow lavas, hyaloclastite and lapilli tuff. There are also elongated pillow structures, called pillow tindars. Examples on Reykjanes peninsula are Sveifluháls, Núpshlíðarháls [ˈnupsˌl̥iːðarˌhauls], Undirhlíðar [ˈʏntɪrˌl̥iːðar̥], Helgafell and Vífilsfell.

The tuyas are often sorted according to their form (morphology) into flat-topped tuyas, elongated tuyas, conical tuyas and complex tuyas. The prominent igneous rock is basalt, though there are also some basaltic andesite or andesite volcanoes on Reykjanes, like Húsmúli [ˈhuːsˌmuːlɪ] and Stapafell [ˈstaːpaˌfɛtl̥] within the Hengill volcanic system. Examples for tuyas on Reykjanes Peninsula are Keilir (conical tuya), Geitafell [ˈceiːtaˌfɛtl̥] (Brennisteinsfjöll), Geitahlíð and Þorbjörn are flat-topped tuyas whereas Þorðarfell [ˈθɔrðarˌfɛtl̥] and Syllingarfell [ˈsɪtliŋkarˌfɛtl̥] are complex tuyas.

=== Postglacial shield volcanoes ===
The Holocene shield volcanoes represent the great bulk of magma production in this part of Iceland and form the base of many other volcanic landforms. Olivine tholeiites constitute about 60% by volume of all post-glacial lava products on the Reykjanes Peninsula." The postglacial shield volcanoes are situated at the periphery of fissure systems. They erupted after the Weichselian glaciation.

These shields are mostly circular in form, built up from pāhoehoe lavas and composed of a low-sloping lava cone surrounded by a lava apron; the older shields are made from picrite, the younger, bigger ones from olivine-tholeiite. They were probably formed in long-lived eruptions (years to decades). The best known edifices are Selvogsheiði [ˈsɛlˌvɔksˌheiːðɪ] (height 176 m, basal width 4.8 km, summit width 0.7 km, volume 0.64 km^{3}), Þráinskjöldur [ˈθrauːɪnˌscœltʏr̥] (volume 5.2 km^{3}), Heiðin há (volume 6 km^{3}) and Sandfellshæð [ˈsantˌfɛlsˌhaiːθ] (4.5 km^{3}). Sandfellshæð is a very regularly constructed shield volcano and the largest in the southern part of Reykjanes Peninsula. Another important shield volcano on Reykjanes Peninsula is Leitin, formed around 5,000 years ago.

Selected post-glaciation geological features in the Reykjanes Peninsula allowing fuller context. Legend: Other shading shows: calderas; central volcanoes; fissure swarms; subglacial terrain above 1,100 m (3,600 ft); seismically active areas; Clicking on the rectangle in the image enlarges to full window and enables mouse-over with more detail.

=== Reykjanes volcanic belt ===
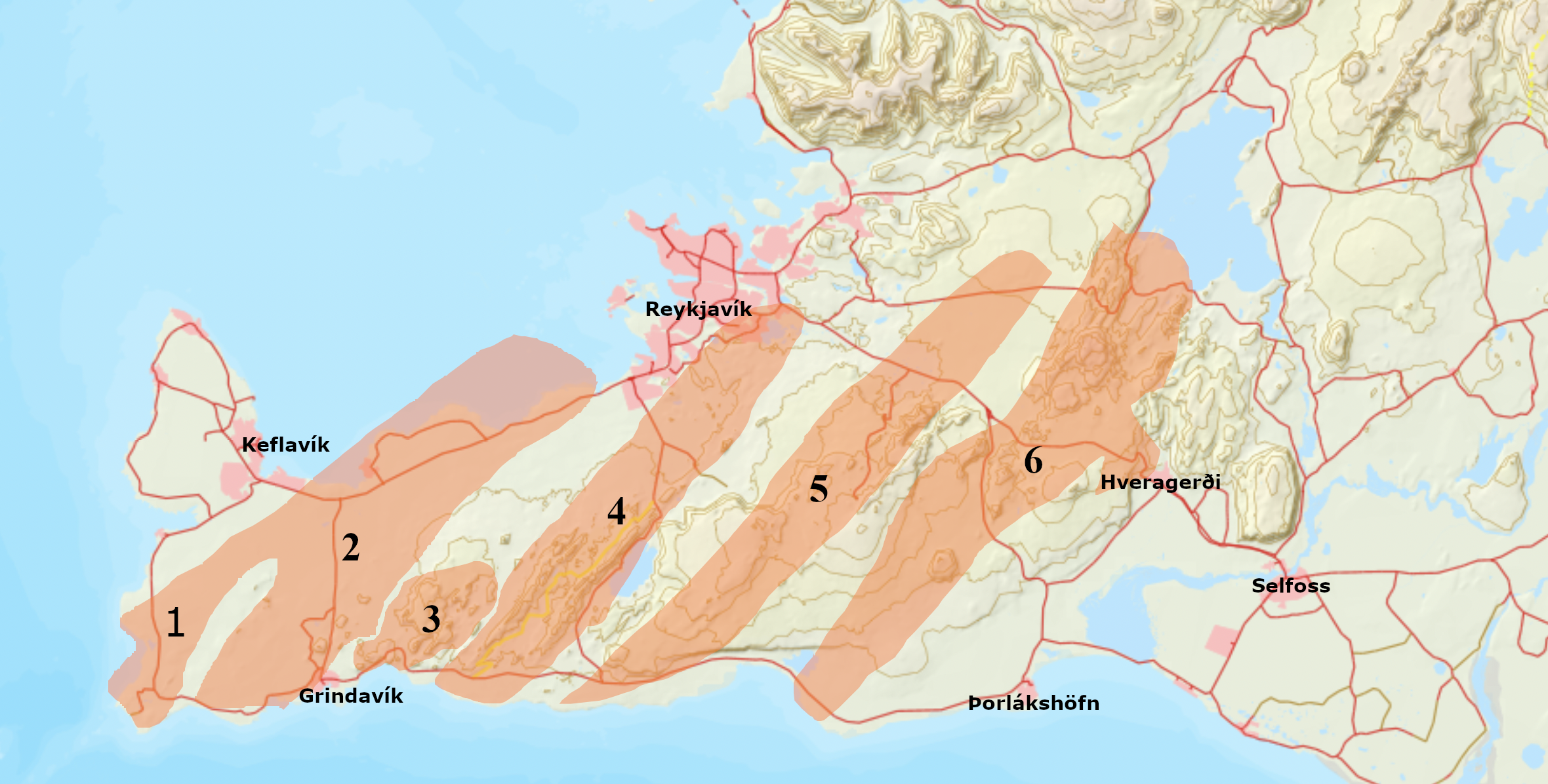
Volcanic systems of the Reykjanes Peninsula (SW-Iceland): 1→Reykjanes (volcanic system), 2→Eldvörp–Svartsengi, 3→Fagradalsfjall, 4→Krýsuvík, 5→Brennisteinsfjöll, 6→Hengill

Since the end of the Pleistocene glaciation (15,000–11,000 years ago in the region), Holocene volcanoes have contributed to the basaltic lava fields of the peninsula. The Reykjanes volcanic belt (previously also known as the Reykjanes Peninsula ridge, or Reykjanes Peninsula volcanic zone), one of the present day volcanic zones of Iceland, is connected to the submarine Reykjanes Ridge and consists (depending on author) of 3 to 6 or even 7 volcanic systems, arranged en echelon, i.e. more or less side by side, and in an average 40° angle to the spreading direction NE–SW over the peninsula. One of the reasons for the varying number of systems in the literature is that geothermal areas, magnetic anomalies, eruptive centers, and geochemistry do not all align.

Within the belt is a region of transition from the mainly extensional structure of the underwater Reykjanes Ridge of the Atlantic mid-oceanic ridge to the trans-tensional plate boundary in the Reykjanes Peninsula. These volcanic systems are: Eldey volcanic system (mostly submarine), Reykjanes volcanic system, Svartsengi volcanic system (often thought to be a part of Reykjanes volcanic system as geochemistry is similar), Fagradalsfjall volcanic system, Krýsuvík volcanic system, Brennisteinsfjöll volcanic system, and Hengill volcanic system (which stretches up to the north and into the West volcanic zone).

Only the Hengill volcanic system, the most eastern system, has an additional central volcano and this volcano is complex as it is at the intersection with the West volcanic zone of Iceland and South Iceland seismic zone, forming the Hengill triple junction. It has some rhyolite and andesite components. It is tectonically the current locus of accretion in the south of Iceland propagating southward at between 3.5–5 cm/year (1.4–2.0 in/year).

Otherwise, the volcanic systems, because they are on top of a rift segment, show a tendency for basaltic fissure eruptions. There are tephra deposits from both offshore explosive Holocene eruptions, some of whom were from volcanoes of the Reykjanes volcanic system, and the most recent Hengill eruption.

== Tectonics ==
Reykjanes Volcanic Belt (RVB) within the volcanic zones of Iceland

As is usual within rift zones, tectonics play an important role on Reykjanes Peninsula. Earthquakes are often registered. They may reach up to magnitude M6, but most of the earthquakes are small. These earthquakes often take place within the volcanic systems, but there are also many faults, fractures and fissures in the N-S direction on the peninsula. Additionally, the region is influenced by the South Iceland seismic zone. This southern transform zone of Iceland is between the West volcanic zone and the East volcanic zone. The larger earthquakes are felt and registered on Reykjanes Peninsula, and they can also trigger medium-sized quakes in this region, as last seen in 2008 and especially in 2000.

== Volcano-tectonic situation in modern times ==
The Reykjanes Peninsula lies within a transtensional rift zone. The rate of spread is about 1.8 cm/year (0.71 in/year). The spreading that occurs generates NE-SE trending fissure swarm faulting and connects the area with the other surrounding rift zones. The stress that is accumulated through the volcanism is released every 800–1000 years through the fissure eruptions. The fissure swarms are the origin of underground near vertical dykes. The Reykjanes' dykes travel near vertically through Quaternary and Tertiary sediments. These dykes generate permeability in rock that would otherwise be impermeable. This increased permeability creates the potential for geothermal extraction at an economic level. The dykes underground reach up to 300 meters to the surface. Every tens of years, microearthquakes move the strike-slip plate boundaries.

Since Iceland's settlement in the 9th century CE, the peninsula has undergone two periods of prolonged volcanism. The first, from 950 to 1240, culminated in the lengthy series of eruptions between 1210 and 1240 called the Reykjanes Fires that deposited substantial amounts of lava and tephra across the peninsula. The volcanoes in the region were subsequently dormant for nearly 800 years. The second episode began in 2020 with increased earthquake activity and has been dubbed the "New Reykjanes Fires" in recognition of the similarity with the previous episode.

=== Tectonic precursors (2020-21) ===
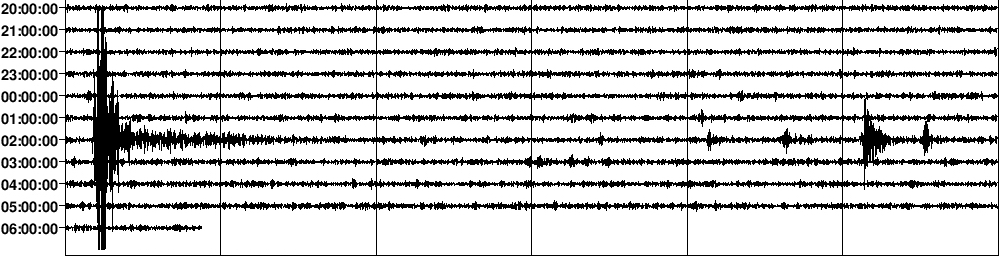
5.2 earthquake near Fagradalsfjall, 7 March 2021

On 20 October 2020, a magnitude 5.6 volcanism-related earthquake was registered at Núpshlíðarháls within the Krýsuvík system. It was followed up by over 1,000 aftershocks and is part of a series stretching over nearly one year. On 24 February 2021, a new earthquake series comprising hundreds of earthquakes and including two earthquakes over 5 were registered by the Icelandic Meteorological Office (IMO), with one registering at 5.7. The alert phase of Iceland's Civil Protection was activated, because even bigger earthquakes could not be excluded in this earthquake series. The whole region has been under close scrutiny of scientists. A magnitude 5.1 earthquake was recorded on 1 March 2021. In addition, satellite pictures showed a pronounced uplift near the mountain Keilir. The magmatic dike to the southwest Keilir has a length of about 5 km.

=== Fagradalsfjall eruptions (2021-23) ===
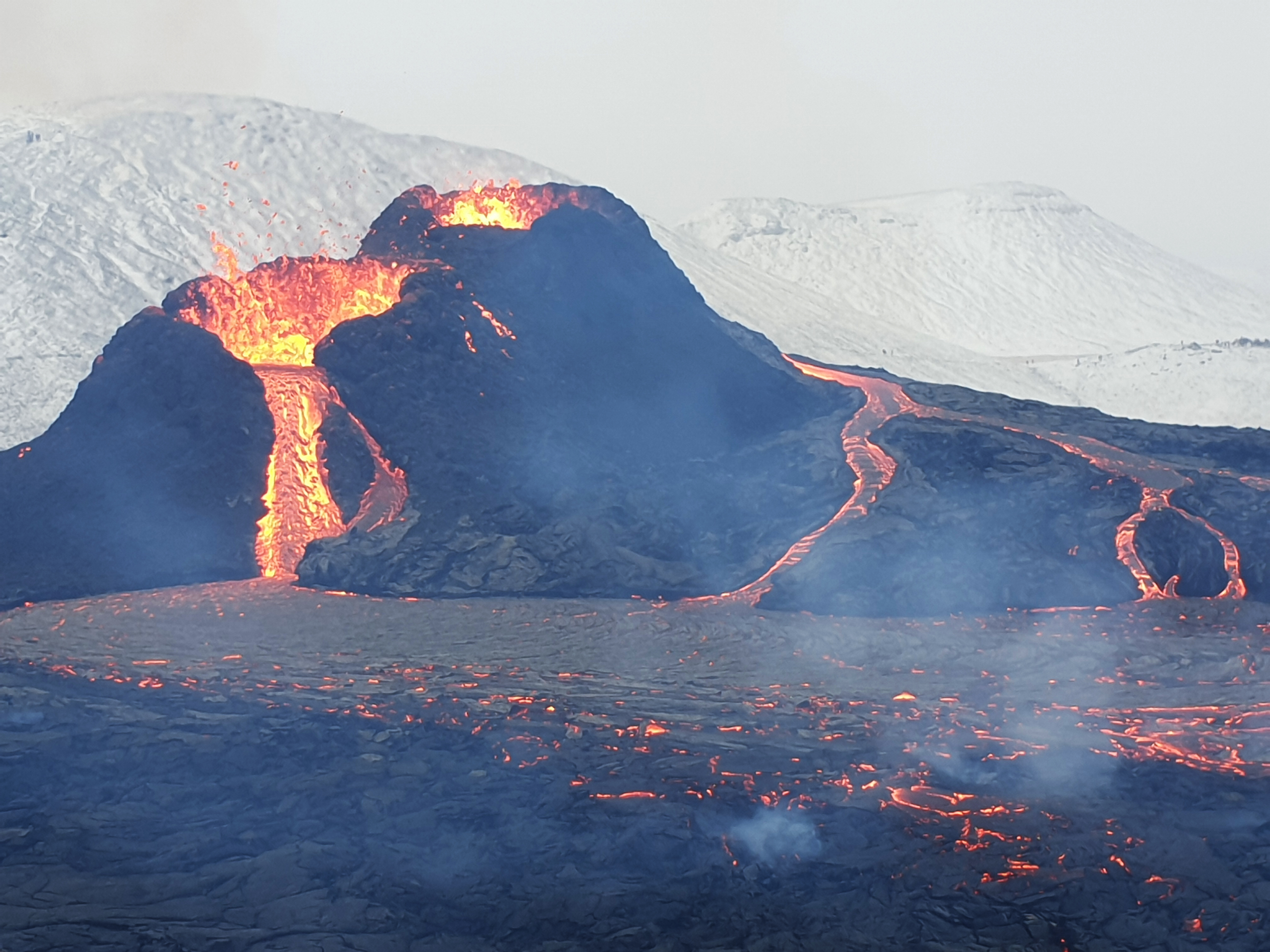
Cinder cone produced by the 2021 Fagradalsfjall eruption

As of February 2024, there have so far been three eruptions on and around the mountain of Fagradalsfjall, in an uninhabited region some 15 km northeast of Grindavík. A volcanic eruption began at Fagradalsfjall on the evening of 19 March 2021. The eruption was small and effusive, from a 500–800 m long fissure; National Geographic predicted that this volcano was unlikely to threaten "any population centers".

The next small fissure eruption in the Fagradalsfjall volcanic system started in the Meradalir valleys on 1 August 2022 and ceased on 22 August 2022.

On 10 July 2023 at 16:40 UTC, a fissure eruption began adjacent to the summit of Litli-Hrútur and ended by the beginning of August 2023.

=== Sundhnúkur eruptions (2023–25) ===
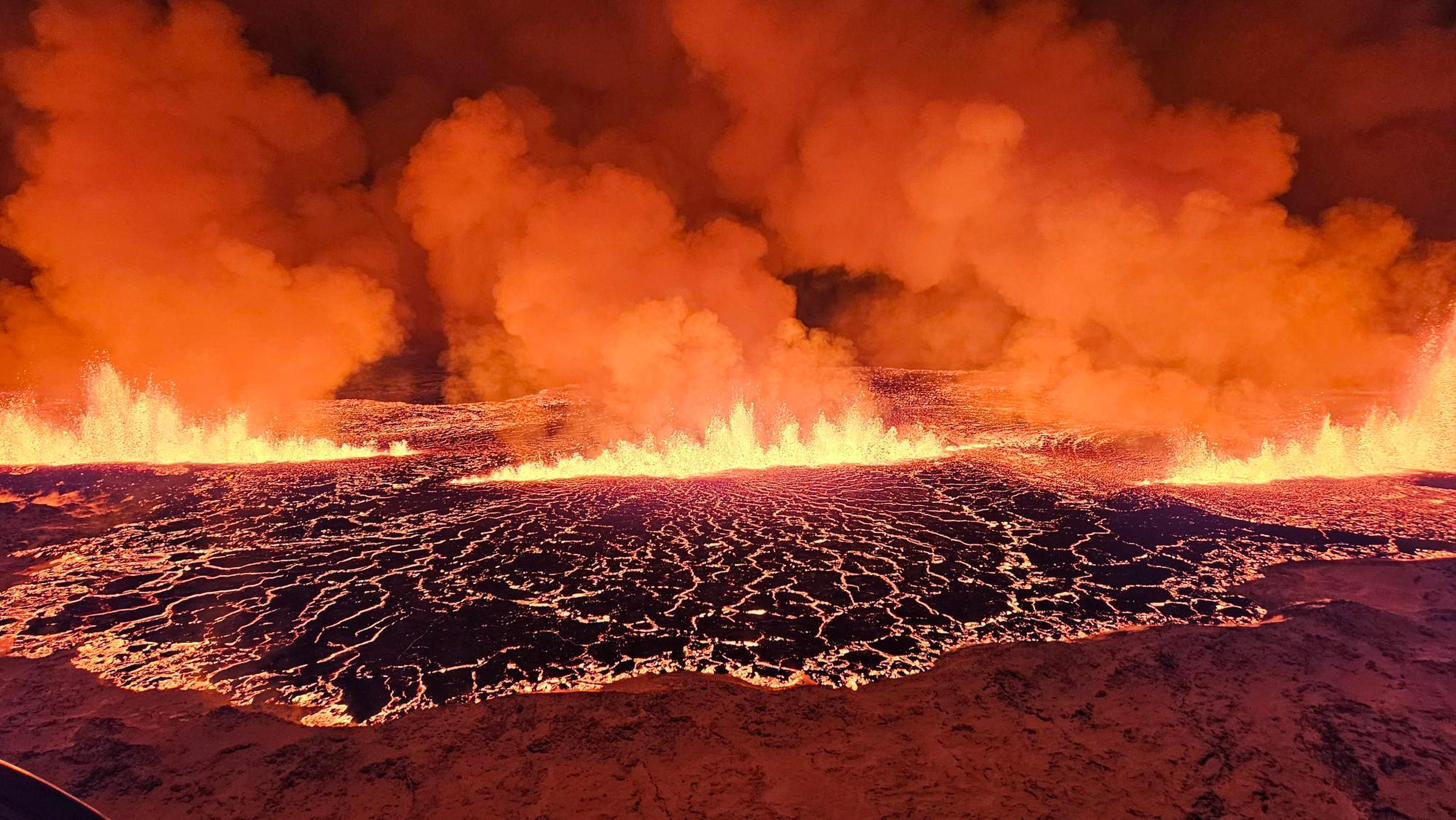
Lava flows and fire fountains at Sundhnúkur in January 2024

There were multiple eruptions immediately north of Grindavík, with one partly occurring within the town's limits.

Beginning in late October 2023, an intense series of earthquakes in and around Grindavík prompted the evacuation of the town, as a large underground magmatic intrusion indicated that an eruption in the area was imminent. The eruption began on 18 December at 10pm local time, north–east of Grindavík at the Sundhnúkur crater row.

Further brief effusive eruptions with a very rapid outflow of large quantities of lava took place on 14 January and 8 February 2024, damaging the outskirts of Grindavik and other infrastructure in the area. On 16 March 2024 a fourth eruption began north–east of Hagafell. This eruption was expected by some by analogy to be similarly short-lived, but was only declared over on the 9th May. An eruption that started on 29 May finished on 22 June 2024. The eruption that started on 22 August 2024 stopped on 5 September 2024. The seventh eruption of the series occurred between 20 November and 8 December 2024. The eighth eruption occurred on 1 April 2025 and the eruptive fissures extended beyond the protective barriers north of Grindavík The ninth eruption commenced on the 16th July 2025.

On March 17, 2026, the Icelandic Met Office stated that more than 23 million cubic meters of magma has entered the system. This marks the largest magma accumulation between eruptions since the onset of volcanic activity. The Met office further warned that the long pause between eruptions does not mean that the volcanic sequence has ended. The most likely scenario to play out is either a magma dike intrusion or another eruption.

== Gallery ==
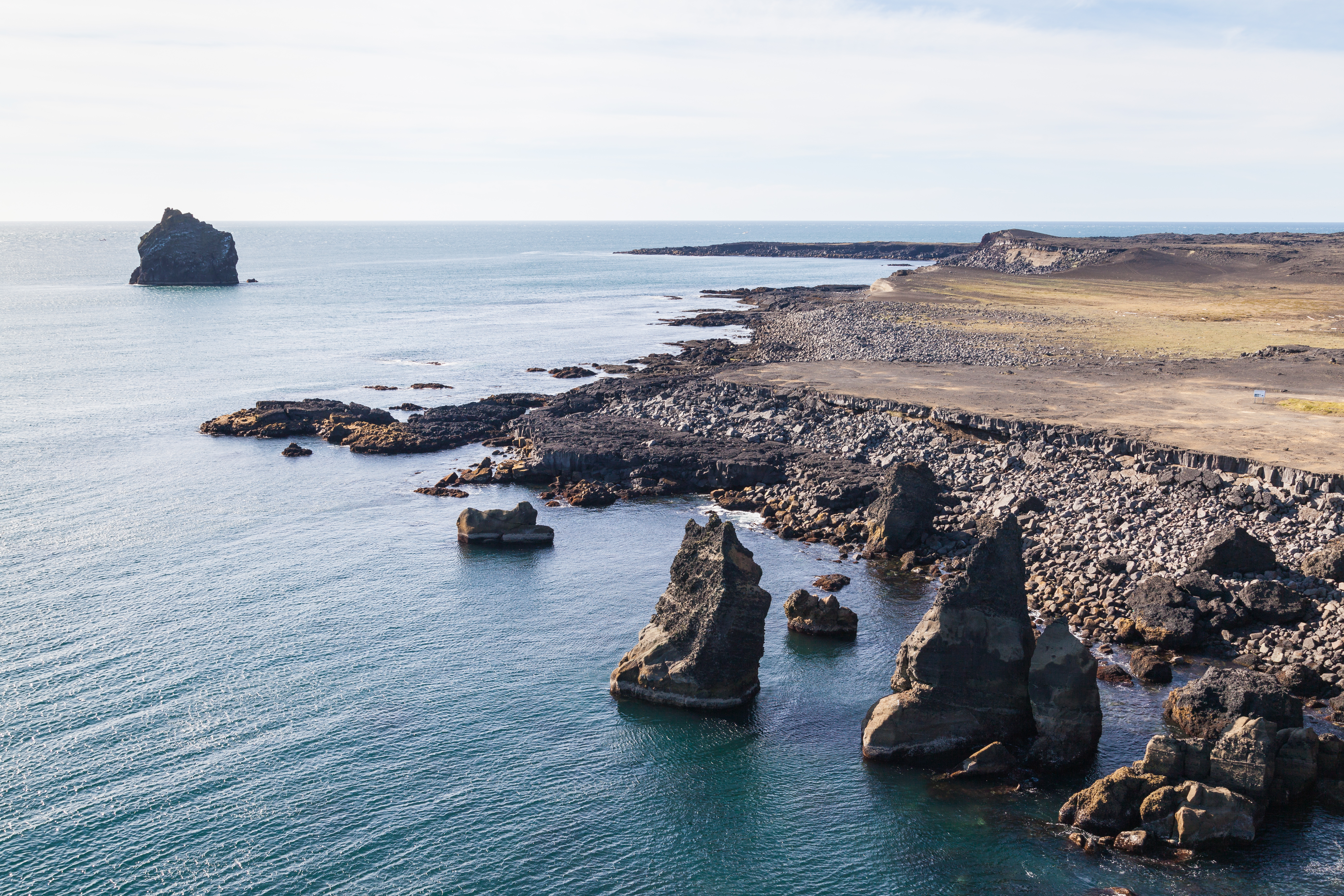
Eroded partially submarine volcano and boulder beaches at Reykjanestá

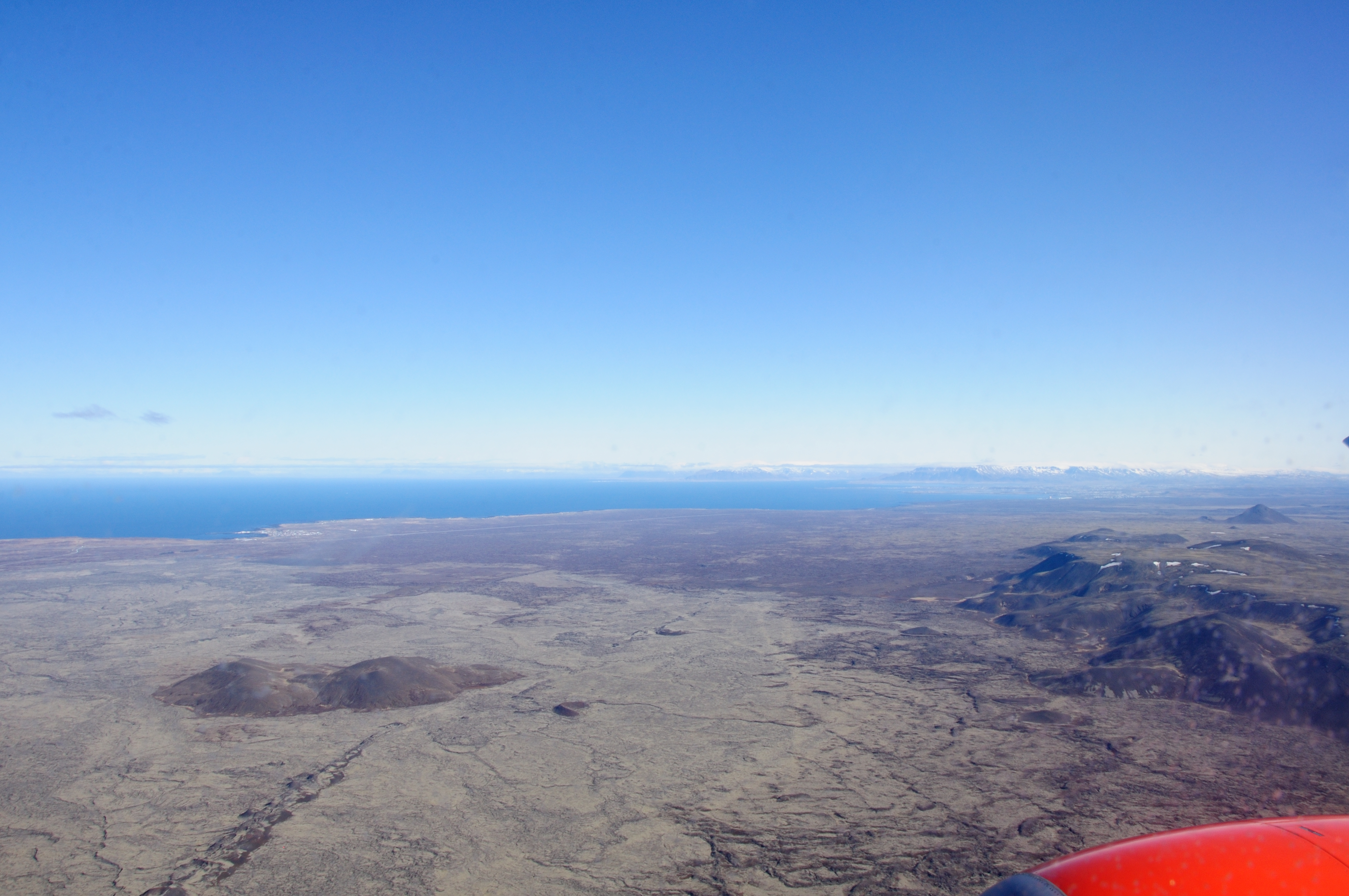
Postglacial shield volcano Þráinskjöldur

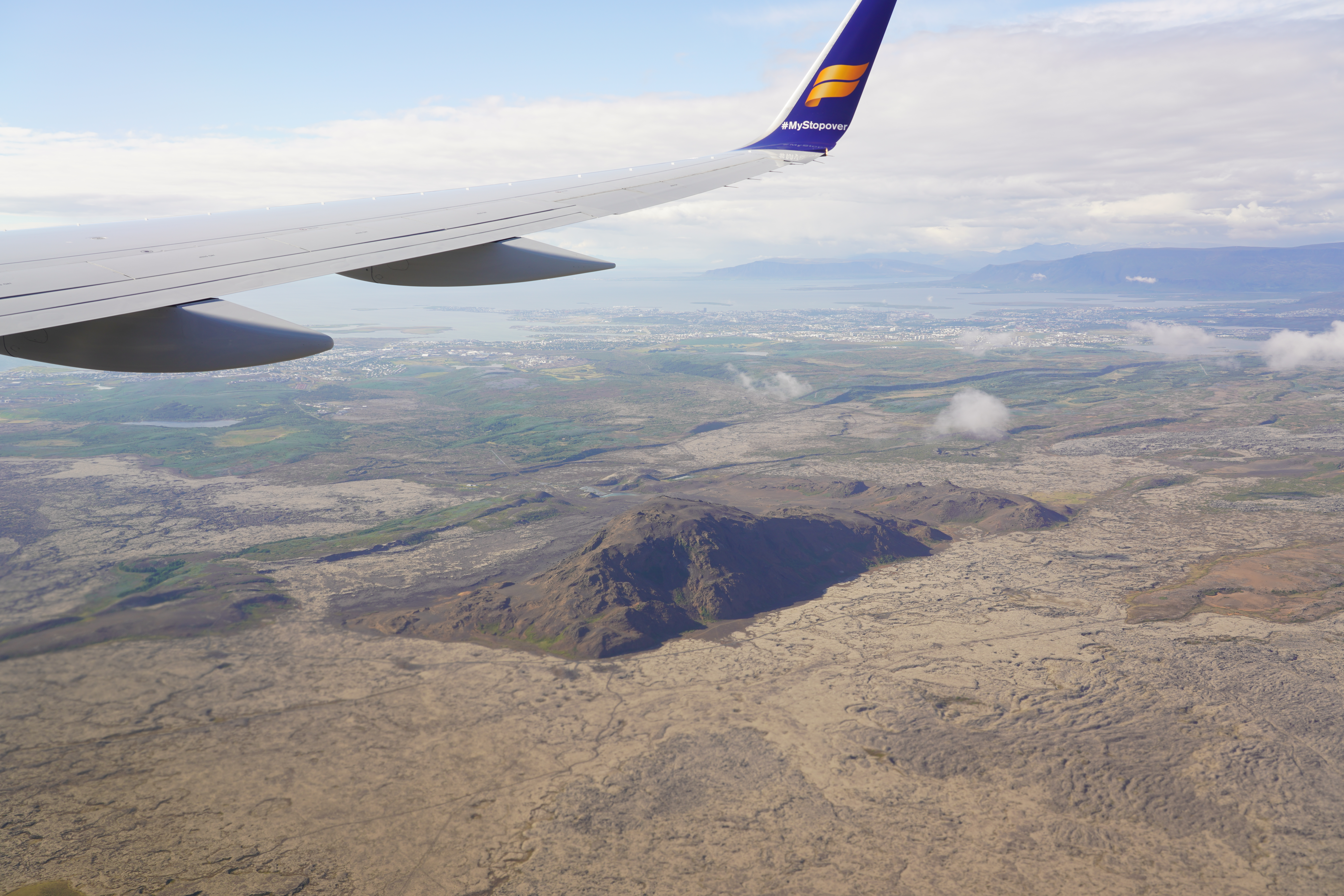
Helgafell (Hafnarfjörður), Valahnúkar, postglacial lava fields and fault systems

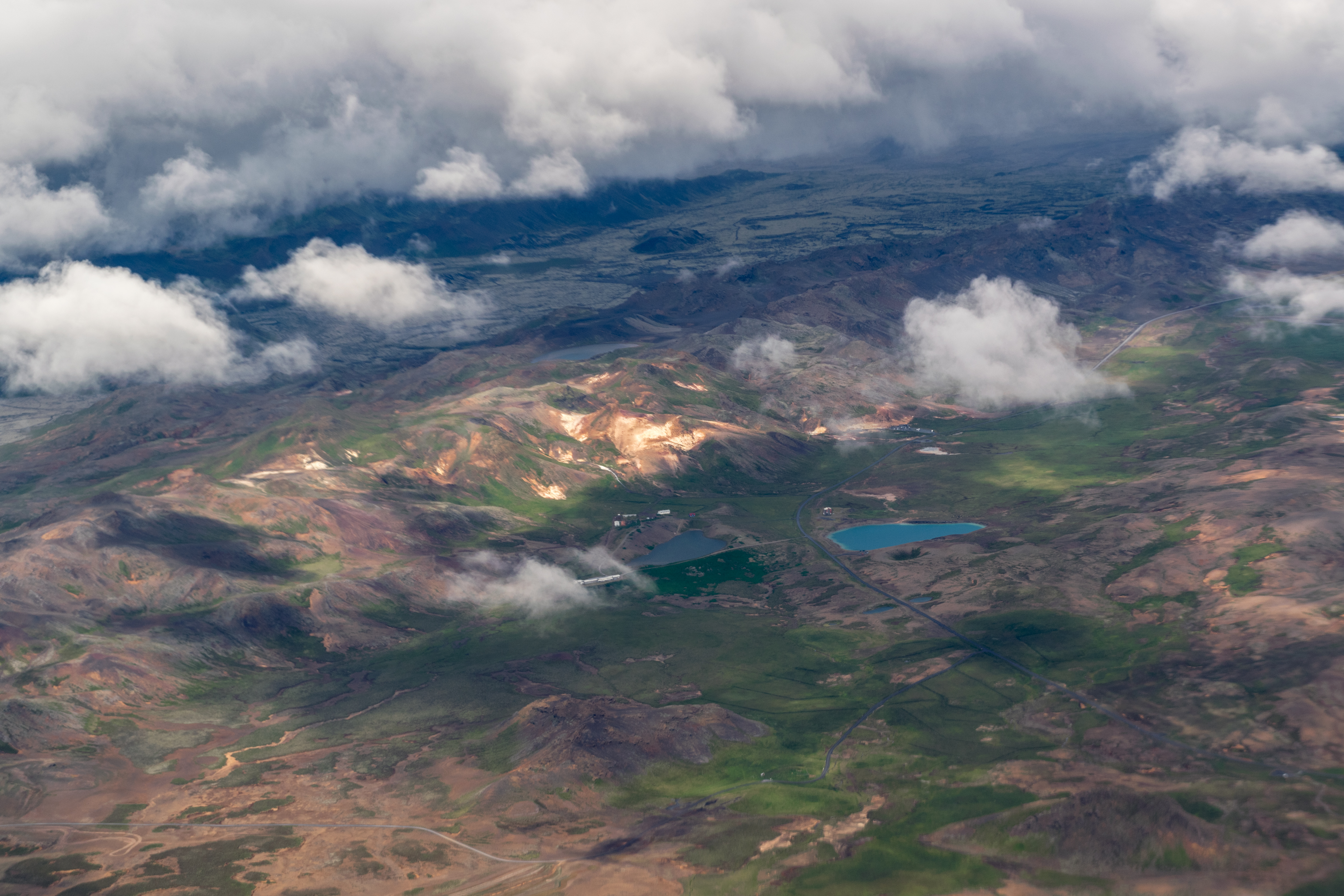
Aerial photograph of the center of Krýsuvík volcanic system with high temperature geothermal areas and maars

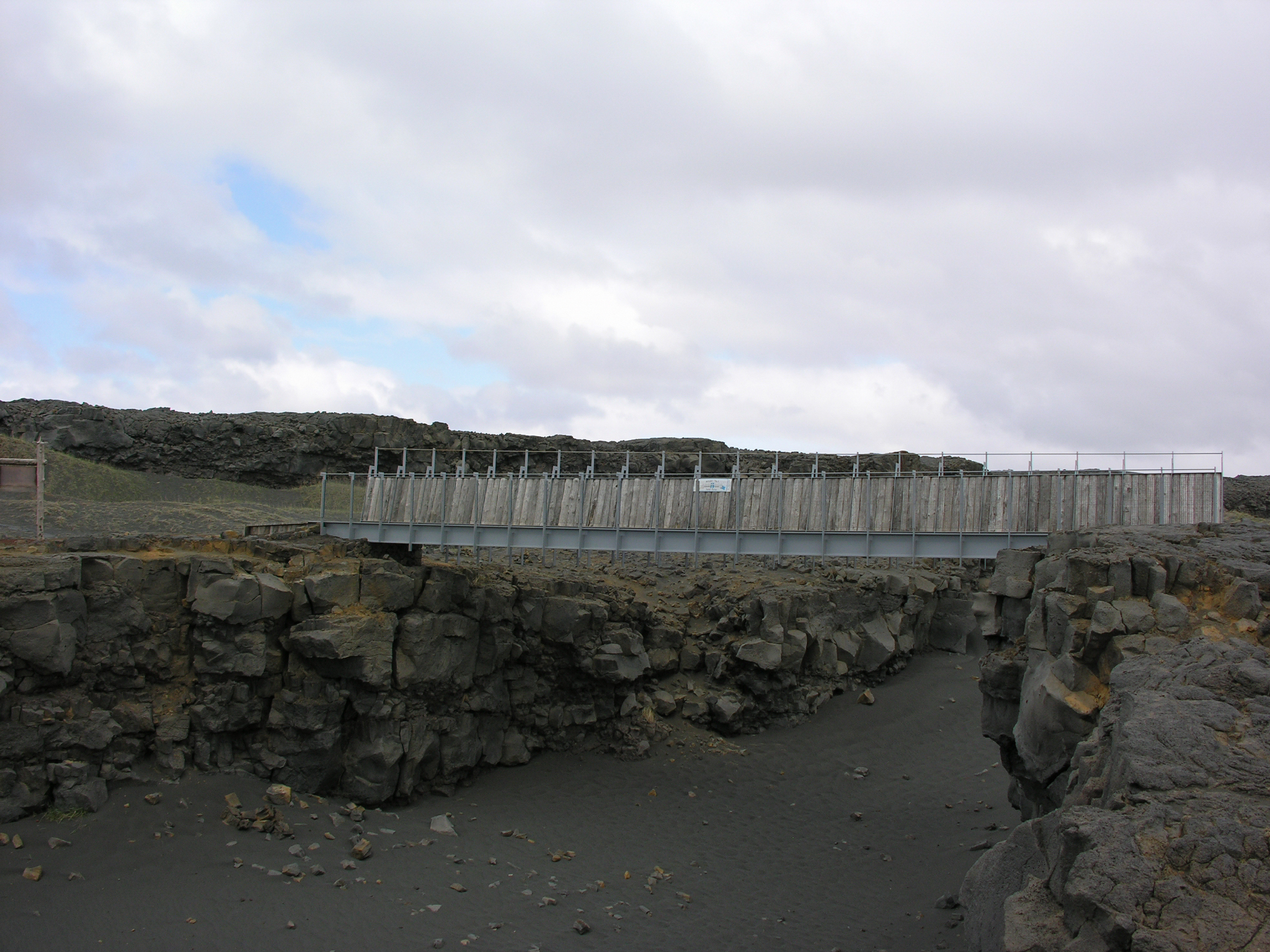
The so-called bridge between continents over a fault near the tip of Reykjanes Peninsula

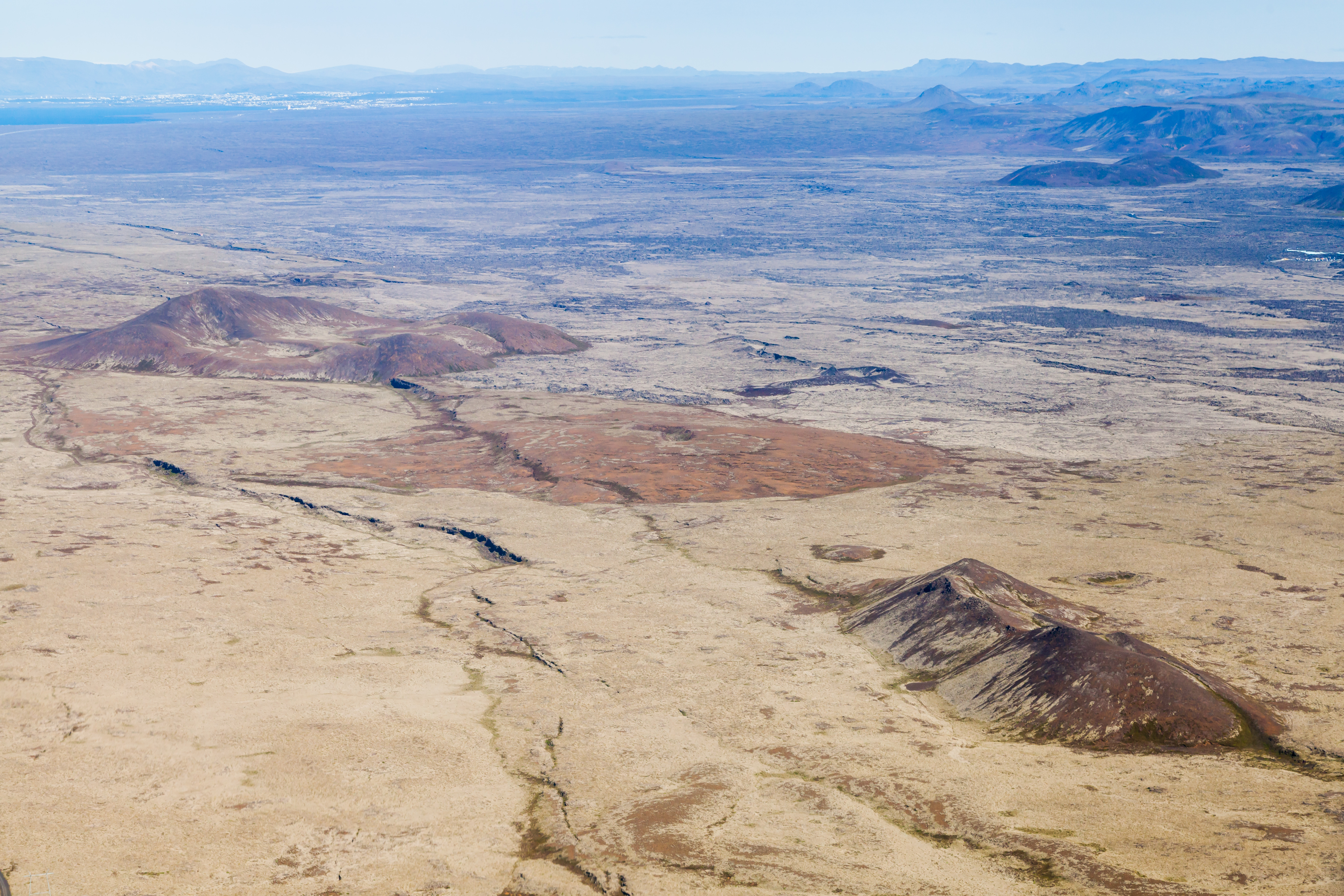
Typical volcano-tectonic environment on Reykjanes Peninsula (from air)

== See also ==
- Volcanism of Iceland
  - List of volcanoes in Iceland
  - List of volcanic eruptions in Iceland
- Geology of Iceland
  - Geological deformation of Iceland
- Global Volcanism Program
