= Helgafell (Hafnarfjörður) =

Mountain in Iceland

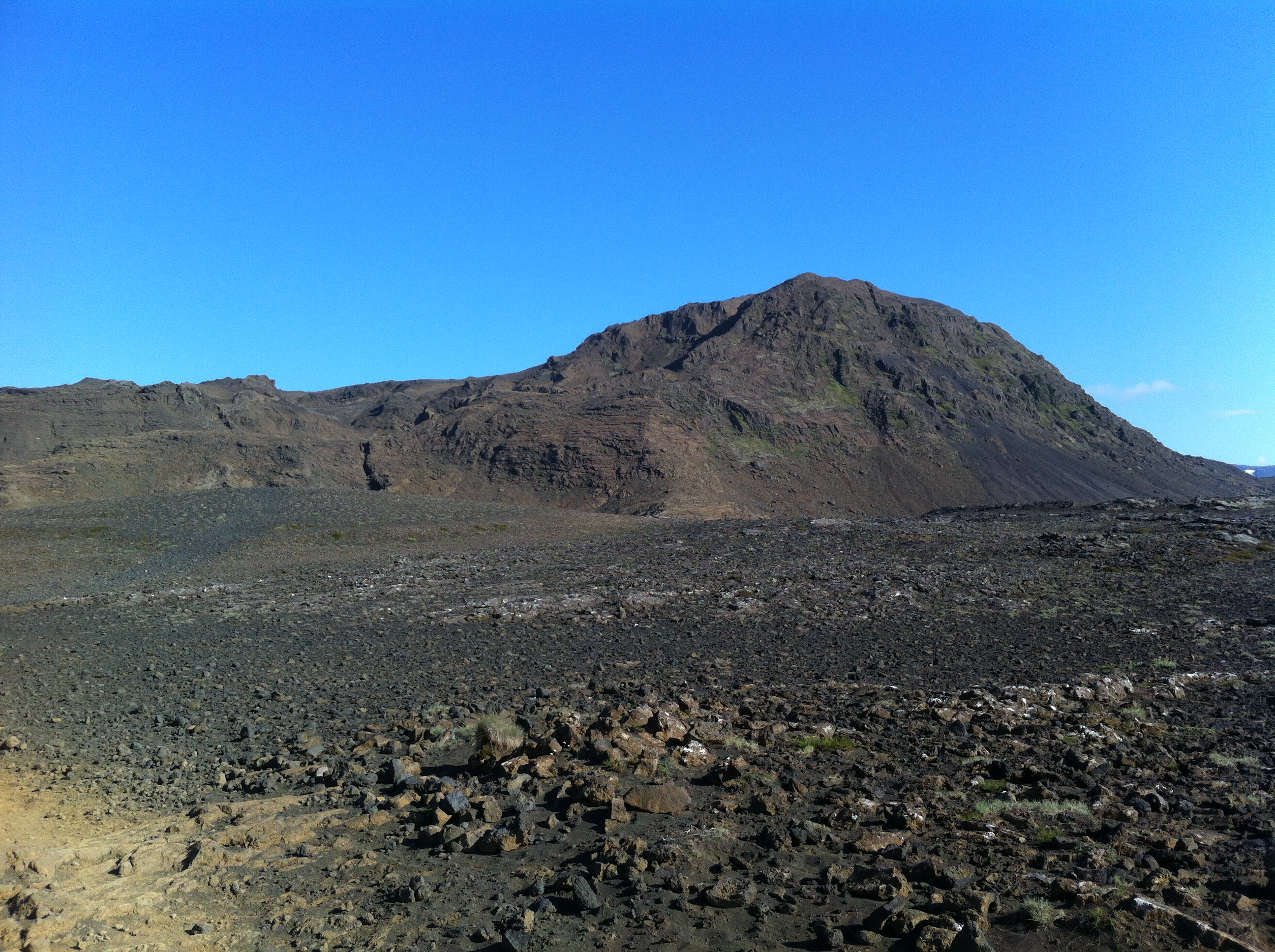
- Helgafell

Highest point
- Elevation: 338 m (1,109 ft)(Ari Trausti Guðmundsson, Pétur Þorsteinsson: Íslensk fjöll. Gönguleiðir á 152 tind. Reykjavík 2004, p. 98)
- Coordinates: 64°00′37″N 21°51′05″W

Naming
- English translation: Holy Mountain
- Language of name: Icelandic

Geography
- Location within Iceland
- Location: Iceland

Geology
- Rock age: Pleistocene (Weichselian)
- Mountain type: Subglacial mound
- Last eruption: Pleistocene

Climbing
- Easiest route: marked hiking trail

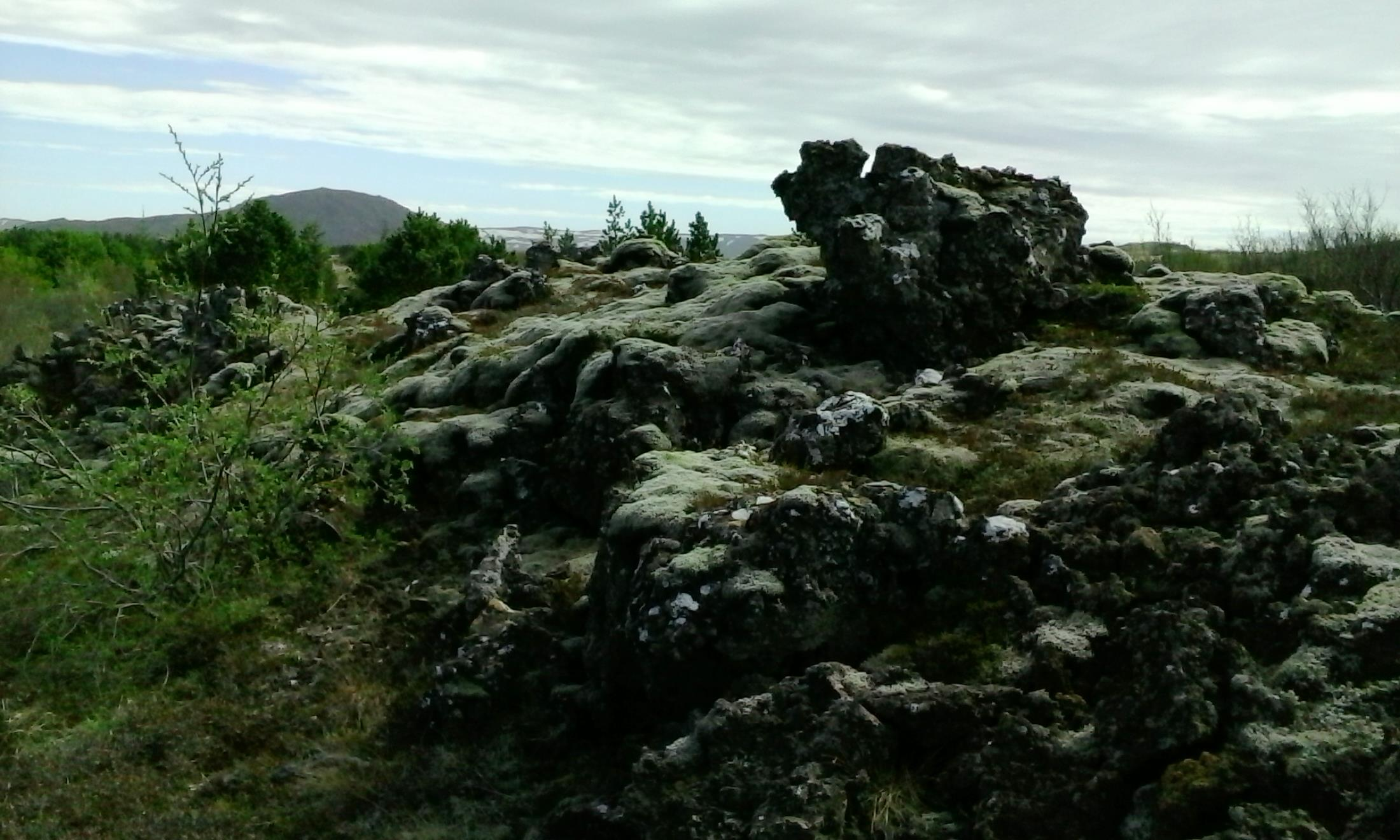
Helgafell with historical Aa lava in front

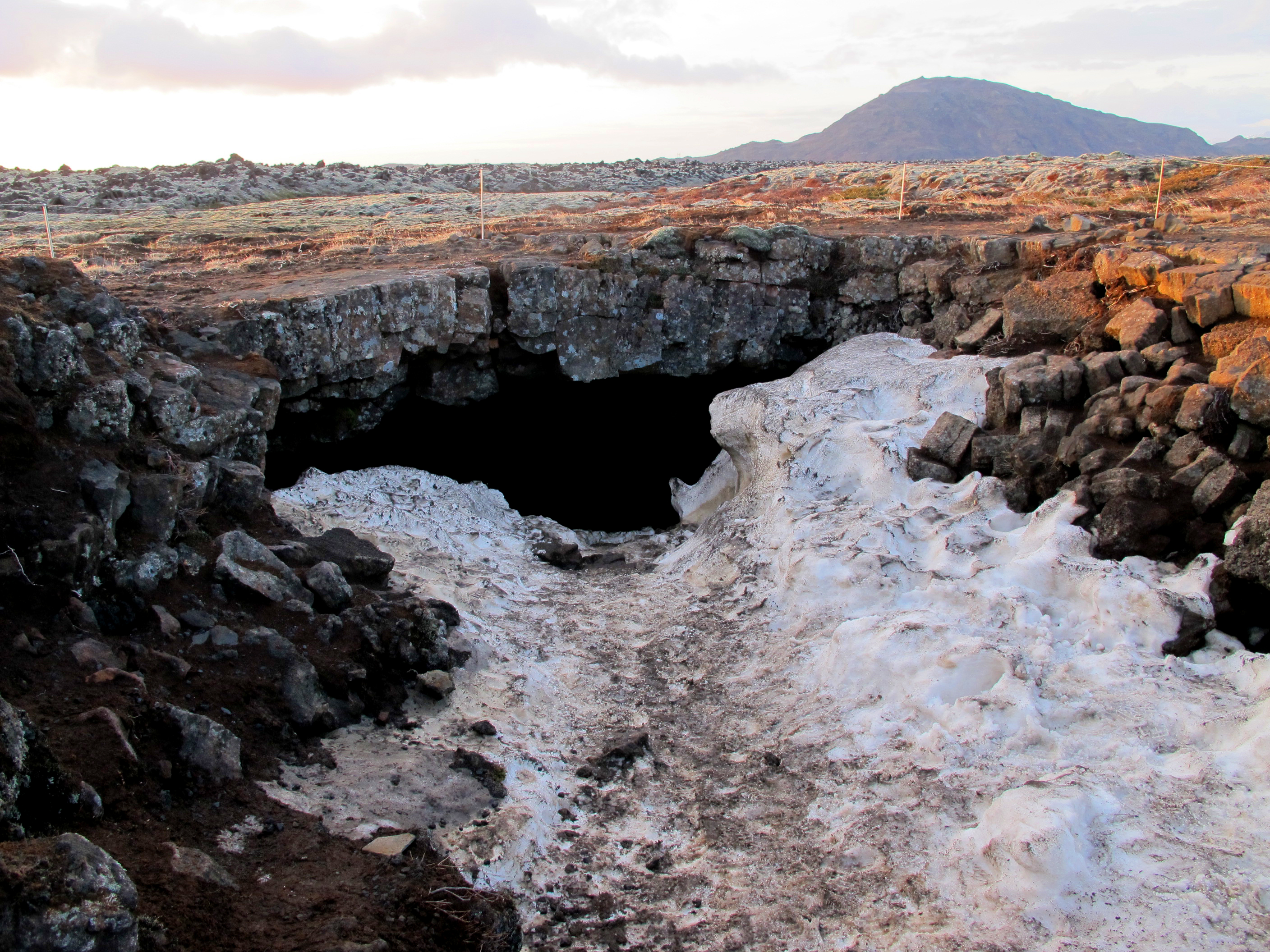
Lava tube entrance with Helgafell in the background

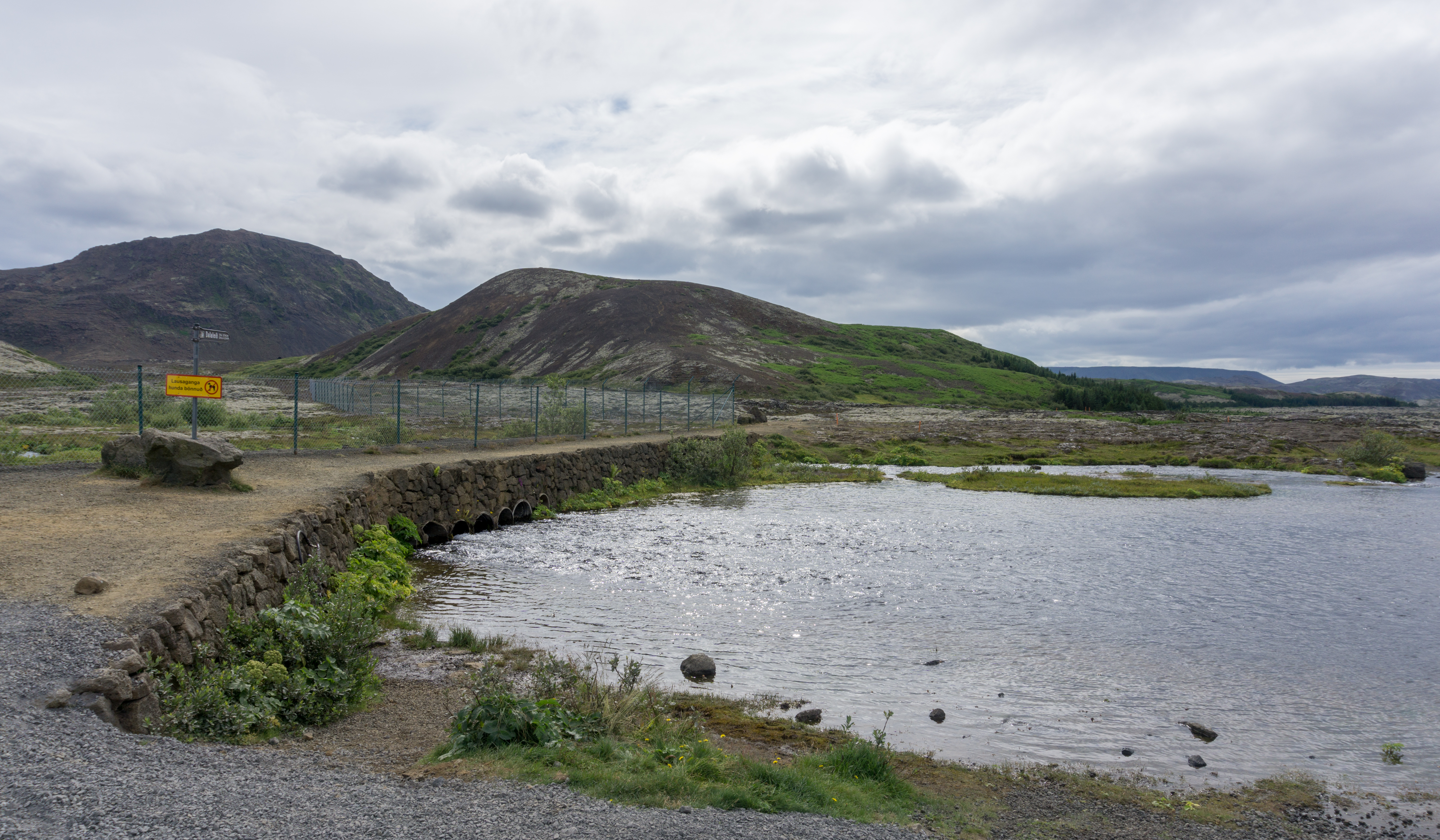
Near Kaldársel

Helgafell (Icelandic pronunciation: [ˈhɛlkaˌfɛtl̥]) is a mountain on Reykjanes peninsula, Iceland. The height of the mountain is 338 m.

== Name ==
Many mountains in Iceland bear the name of Helgafell. It means “holy mountain” and is thought that in the Viking era, these mountains played a special – if unknown – role in the worship of their gods. An architect from Reykjavík measured out the positions of the very old cairn on top of Helgafell as well as the cairns of two other mountains in the vicinity and came to the conclusion that by using the positions of the sun as well as the shades of the cairns, the Vikings had constructed a calendar.

== Subglacial volcano ==
The mountain is a hyaloclastite ridge formed during the Weichselian glaciation of the Pleistocene epoch. Its typical form shows well as there is not much vegetation on its slopes.

Helgafell is located in a tectonically and volcanically active region: the last eruption on Reykjanes peninsula in February 2024.

The mountain is situated within the area of the Krýsuvík volcanic system. It “is thought to have formed in a single subglacial fissure eruption under at least 500 m (1,600 ft) of glacial ice“. The original ridge was about 2 km (1.2 mi) long. Some Holocene lava flows, also from the neighbouring Brennisteinsfjöll volcanic system, surrounded the mountain later.

Helgafell is made mostly from palagonite, i.e. palagonitized tephra, dikes and a small amount of pillow lava.

=== Formation of Helgafell ===
Helgafell is most probably a monogenetic subglacial mound, because no traces of subaerial eruptions were found on its slopes.

The ice sheet under which the Helgafell eruptions took place, was about 500 m (1,600 ft) thick at time of eruption. In the beginning a fissure opened at right angles to the ice flow, which was from the southeast to the northwest. It was about 15 km (9.3 mi) from the glacier snout. There is a big terminal moraine at the coast at Álftanes. Rapid ice melting was the consequence of explosive eruption and therefore magma fragmentation from the start of the eruption. At Helgafell next an edifice was formed about 300 m (980 ft) high in an ice vault, melt water drained away very fast through subglacial channels so that the explosive activity continued to the end, which seems to have been after some days. This explains the fact, that Helgafell is next to overall made from mafic hyaloclastite, whereas most other researched smaller subglacial volcanoes showed a basis of pillow lavas. Of these and some small intrusions, the researchers just found minimal quantities.

Aeolian erosion removed part of the summit in the Holocene and other parts of the mountain slumped.

The lava fields surrounding Helgafell today are about 40–80 m (130–260 ft) thick by gravity survey.

== Hut Kaldársel and river Kaldá ==
Kaldársel is a hut run by an Icelandic youth organization (KFUM) where hikers can also stay. It is possible to get by car along Kaldárselsvegur from Hafnarfjörður up to a parking lot in the vicinity.

The hut has its name from Kaldá, a small intermittent river nearby. The area around it is fenced in, because it is part of the drinking water resources of the neighbouring towns.

Folk tales “explain” the disappearances of the river: Once a man could use witch craft, but lost two of his sons who drowned in the river. He shall then have used some of his tricks so that the river had to go underground.

== Hiking ==
The mountain is relatively close to Hafnarfjörður as well as to Reykjavík. Many hiking trails are in its vicinity and also up on the mountain, so that it is a very popular hiking area. There are also two long hiking trails at the base of the mountain: the Reykjavegur which makes it possible to hike all the length of Reykjanes Peninsula (about 120 km) and the old trail of Selvogsgata.

It is a rather easy hike up on the mountain and even easier to hike around it or just up on Valahnúkarskarð between Helgafell and Valahnúkar (another subglacial mound from the Pleistocene as well as the mountain Húsfell in a certain distance).

== See also ==
- Reykjanes
- Reykjanes Volcanic Belt
- Helgafell (Snæfellsnes)
- Helgafell (Vestmannaeyjar)
