= Keilir =

Mountain in Iceland

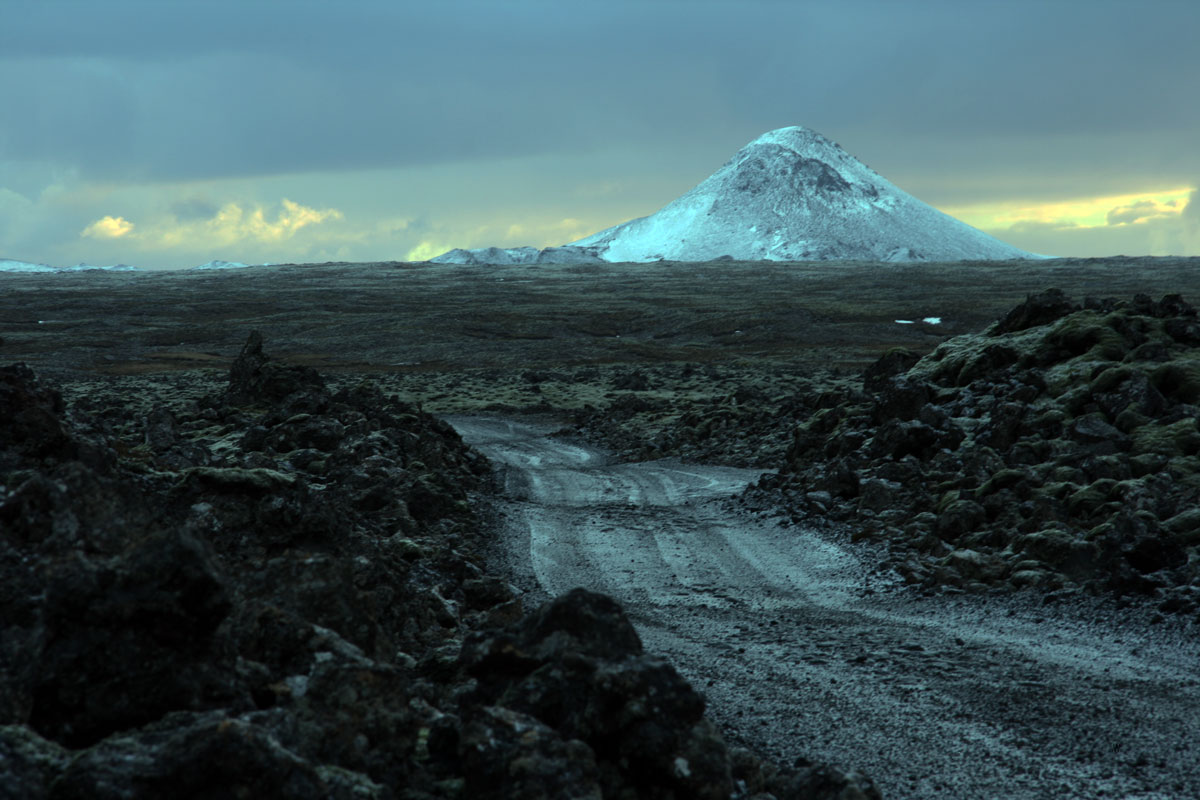
- Keilir with the smaller Keilisbörn hills in winter

Highest point
- Elevation: 397 m (1,302 ft)
- Coordinates: 63°56′33″N 22°10′15″W

Geography
- Location within Iceland
- Location: Reykjanes Peninsula, Iceland

Geology
- Mountain type: Subglacial mound or tuya
- Volcanic belt: Reykjanes Volcanic Belt
- Last eruption: Pleistocene

Climbing
- Easiest route: from ENE

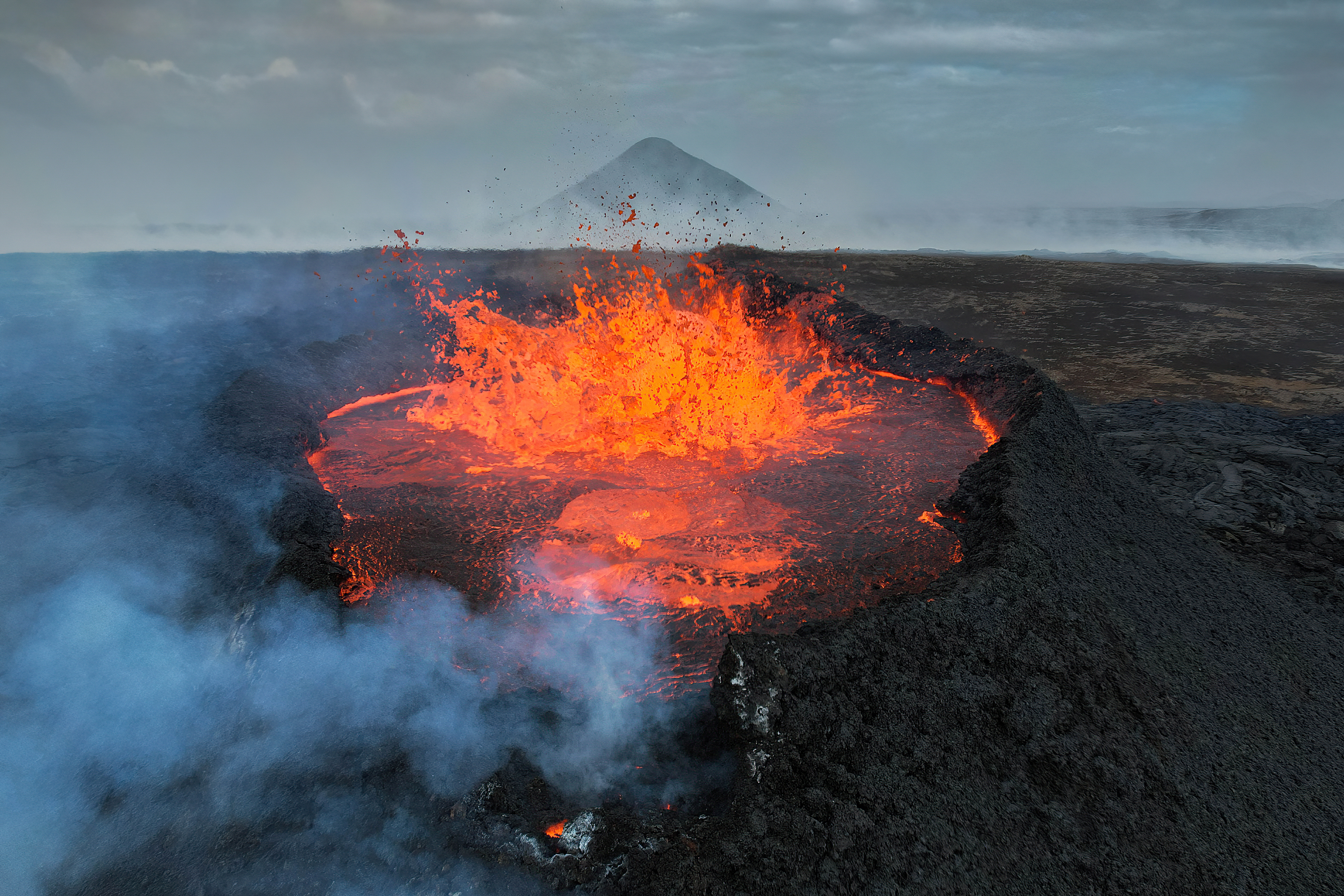
Volcano eruption at Fagradalsfjall next to Litli-Hrútur, with Keilir in the background

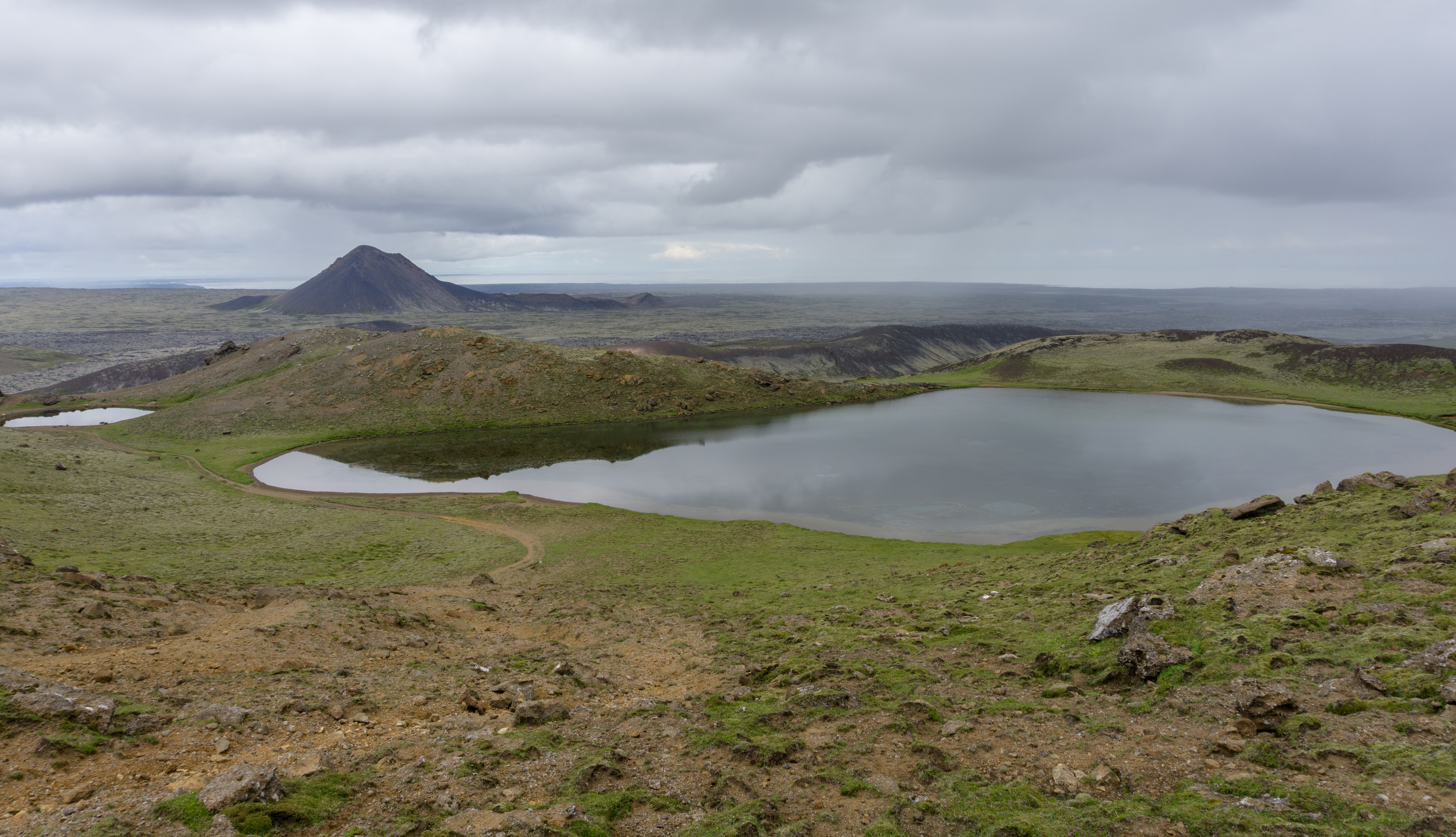
Keilir from Spákonuvatn lake, Reykjavegur hiking trail

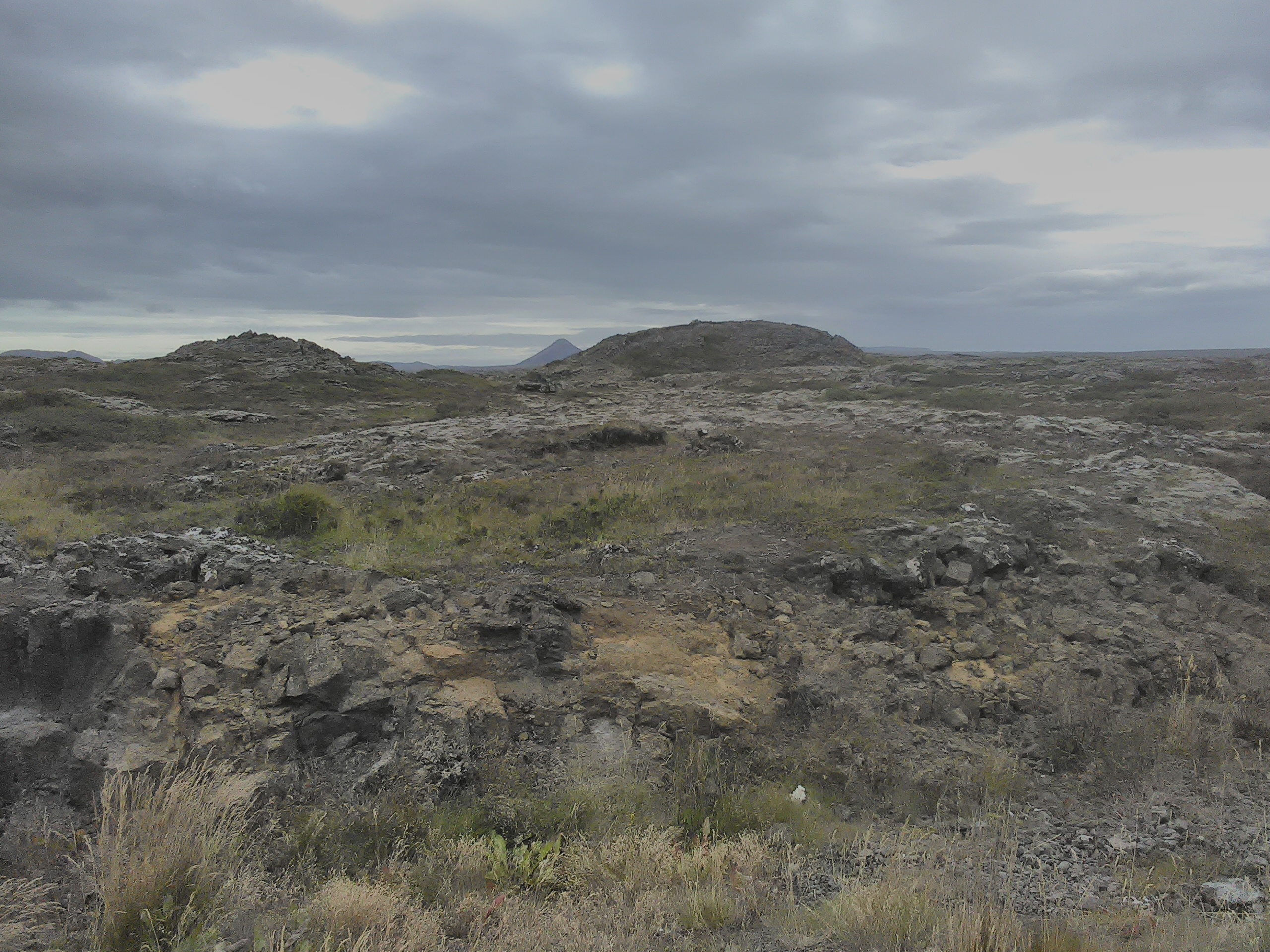
Remote view of Keilir among tumuli within Hvassahraun lava field (Krýsuvík volcanic system)

Keilir (Icelandic pronunciation: [ˈcʰeiːlɪr̥]; 378 m asl) is a Pleistocene subglacial mound or conical tuya on Reykjanes Peninsula in Iceland. Its basal area is 0.773 km^{2}, summit area 0.004 km^{2}, basal width 0.99 km, summit width 0.07 km, and volume 0.0362 km^{3}.

It is located within the Krýsuvík volcanic system and Reykjanesfólkvangur. It is about 17 miles southwest of Iceland's capital, Reykjavík.

In March 2021, there were earthquakes reported near the mountain, followed by a fissure lava eruption further southwest at Fagradalsfjall.

== Formation ==
Keilir was formed during a subglacial fissure eruption, which concentrated in the end at one vent. Additionally, some small, sub-glacially formed hills to the north are results of this eruption.

=== Eruptions under the Weichselian glaciers on Reykjanes Peninsula ===
Detailed stratigraphy addresses the different parts of the eruption. The eruption thawed the glacier's ice, forming a subglacial lake within which the volcano continued to develop. The lake's water made contact with the magma within the vent, causing explosive activity. Tephra then settled down into the subglacial lake in layers, building up into a hill and small, elongated mountain covering the vent(s). Like other eruptions of this kind, when continued over a longer period of time, the water eventually does not reach the vent(s) any more, at which point lava begins to flow.

In Keilir's top region, a small cap of lava (0.020 km^{2}) could mean that the volcanic mountain is a tuya, if the lava is from subaerial eruptions that occurred at the end of the eruption series. Alternatively, it could be a volcanic plug if the lava cooled and plugged up the vent.

Ice thickness and a more exact time of eruption are not known other than that it place during the Pleistocene (Weichselian).

=== Comparisons to an Antarctic subglacial tuff cone ===
Scientists discovered a similar monogenetic subglacial tuff cone within Antarctica's ice in Victoria Land and were able to determine the thickness of ice that had covered the vent during that eruption. However, the Antarctic cone lay under a polar ice sheet, and not a temperate glacier as was the case with Keilir, and is much older—around 640,000 years old—whereas Keilir is up to 100,000 years old. There are other key differences: the tuff cone from Antarctica is positioned next to known granitic plutonic complexes and seems to be a parasitic cone of a stratovolcano, whereas Keilir is located next to presently active volcanic systems and looks like it is on top of the shield volcano Þráinskjöldur, which is younger than the sub-glacial formation. Both are located on rift zones, with Keilir on the Reykjanes Rift. They are composed of similar rocks, mafic lapilli tuff (called "móberg" in Icelandic).

== Use as landmark ==
The mountain is identifiable from afar, including from Reykjavík and the sea, so it was used as a landmark by fishermen and seamen for many centuries.

== Hiking ==
There is a hiking trail leading up on the mountain from ENE. At the top, a guestbook can be found within a box.

In clear weather, much of the of Reykjanes Peninsula and Faxaflói can be seen from the top.

== See also ==
- Geology of Reykjanes Peninsula
- Krýsuvík (volcanic system)
