= Vatnajökulsvegur =

Trail in Iceland

Vatnajökulsvegur (Icelandic pronunciation: [ˈvahtnaˌjœːkʏlsˌvɛːɣʏr̥]) is an ancient highland trail linking southern to eastern Iceland across the highlands. The exact route is not known* today but is believed to have been either through Vonarskarð pass, or by going to the north of Tungnafellsjökull and then by the western edge of Dyngjujökull across the Gæsavötn area. The lawyer Árni Oddsson (d. 1665) is said to have travelled with his documents this route on horseback in the summer of 1618 because it was the shortest way between Vopnafjörður and Alþingi at Þingvellir where he needed to defend his father bishop Oddur Einarsson. In the summer 1839 Björn Gunnlaugsson and pastor Siguður Gunnarsson travelled along Vatnajökulsvegur.

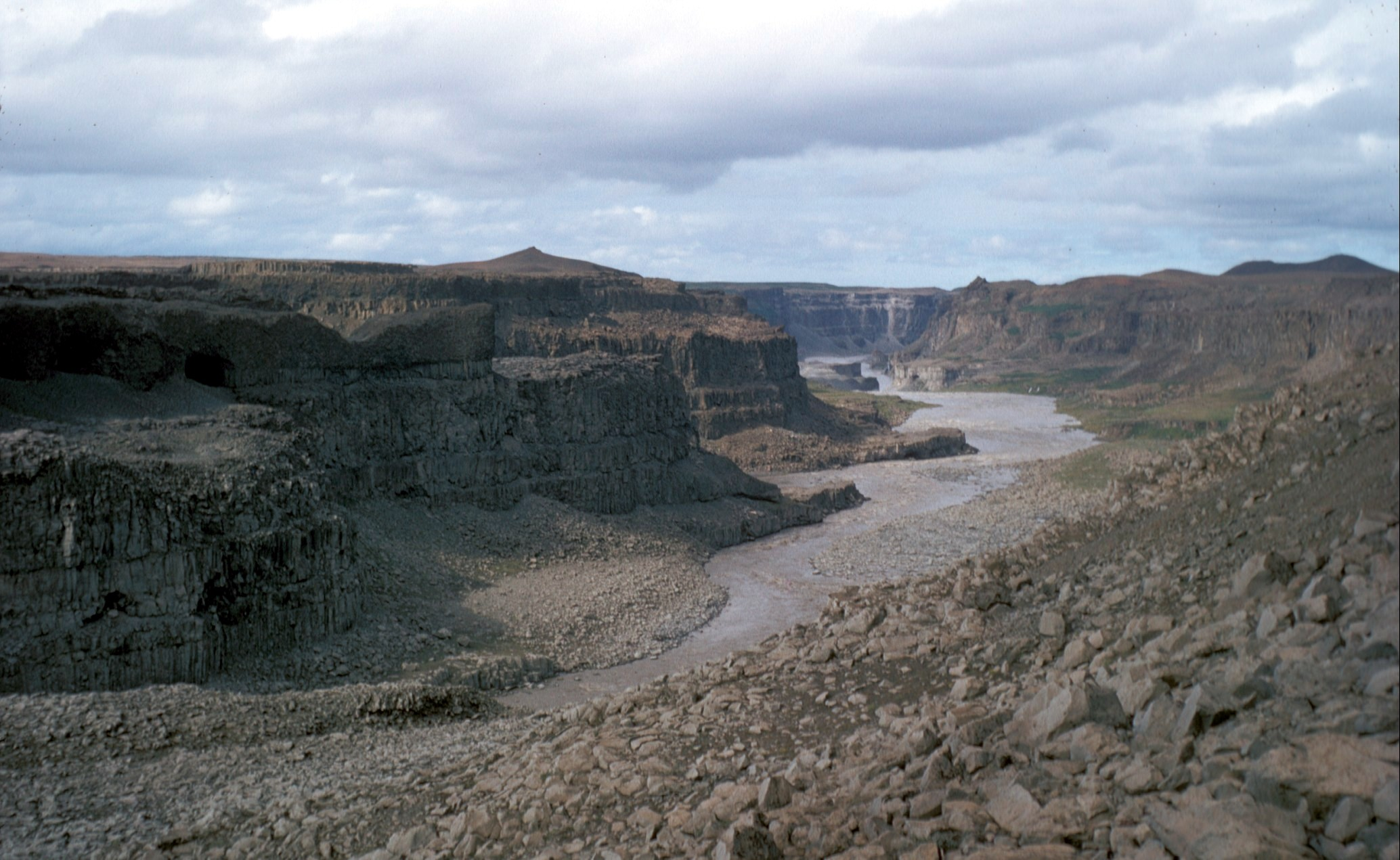
the ancient highland trail was believed to cross the glacier river Jökulsá á Fjöllum

Vatnajökulsvegur would start on the farm Brú in Jökuldalur and go southwest through Laugarvalladalur and Vestridalur to Fagridalur and that would take 7–8 hours. Then it would cross the glacier river Jökulsá á Fjöllum, or go to Hvannalindir. Pétur Brynjólfsson (born 1794) rode on horseback from Brú over Kverká and Kreppa, south of Hvannalindir and further along Vatnajökull over Skjálfandafljót to Kiðagil. He did not go through Vonarskarð pass. Björn Gunnlaugsson went this route in both 1838 and 1839 in order to find a new main route between the east and the south of Iceland; The first year he went north of Tungnafellsjökull but the second year through the Vonarskarð pass. In 1839 he went from the most northern part of Rangárvallasýslu, Landsveit over Tungnaá and Kaldakvísl to Illugaver by Sauðafell and then over the lava fields to Vonarskarð and further east along the glacier to Hvannalindir and then to Brú. The stories about Vatnajökulsvegur interested the nature researcher I. C. Schythe who travelled the route on horseback in 1840 over Sprengisandur north Tungnafellsjökull to Hvannalindir. It took 34 hours from Sprengisandur.

- On a map of Iceland from 1844, Vatnajokulsvegur is shown going through Vonarskard pass.
