= Baugur =

Baugur may refer to:

- Baugur (crater), a volcanic crater in Iceland
- Baugur Group, a former Icelandic investment company
