= Holuhraun =

Lava field in Iceland

- Lava field
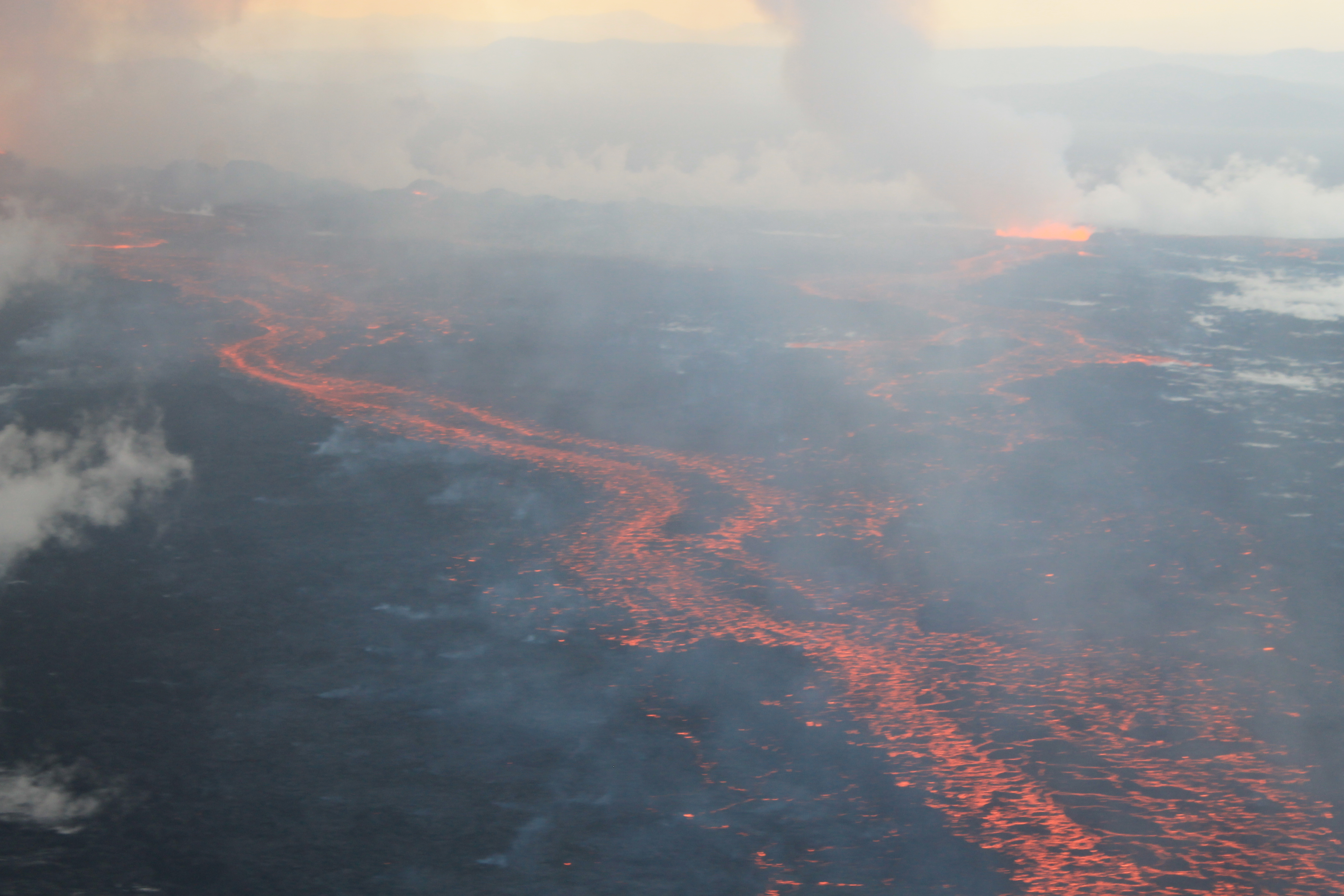
- The Holuhraun lava field, on 4 September 2014, during the 2014 eruption
- Geological features near Holuhraun with the source of the lava being the Bárðarbunga central volcano outlined in red. The 2014 Holuhraun lava flow is a deep shade of purple, the 1797 Holuhraun lava flow is shaded slightly lighter, while other older Bárðarbunga associated lava flows are light purple. Shading also shows: calderas, other central volcanoes, fissure swarms, subglacial terrain above 1,100 m (3,600 ft) and seismically active areas between 1995 to 2007. Clicking on the image enables full window and mouse-over with more detail. Map of Iceland showing the location of Holuhraun.
- Location within Iceland
- Coordinates: 64.85°N 16.83°W
- Location: Suður-Þingeyjarsýsla, Northeastern Region, Iceland

Holuhraun ([ˈhɔːlʏˌr̥œyːn]) is a lava field just north of the Vatnajökull ice cap, in the Icelandic Highlands, in Suður-Þingeyjarsýsla, Northeastern Region, Iceland. The lava field was created by fissure eruptions. After a research expedition in 1880, the lava field was initially called Kvislarhraun [ˈkʰvɪstlar̥ˌr̥œyːn]. Four years later, it received its current name from geologist and geographer Þorvaldur Thoroddsen.

Holuhraun was the site of a volcanic eruption which began on 29 August 2014 and produced a lava field of more than 85 km^{2} (33 mi^{2}) and 1.4 km^{3} (0.34 mi^{3}) – the largest in Iceland since 1783.

== Geography ==
Holuhraun is situated at the southern end of Ódáðahraun [ˈouːˌtauːðaˌr̥œyːn], which is one of the largest lava fields in the country. The main volume of the Jökulsá á Fjöllum river flows from the eastern side of Holuhraun, in the Kverkfjöll area. Hrímalda [ˈr̥iːmˌalta], Urðarháls [ˈʏrðarˌhauls] and Kistufell [ˈcʰɪstʏˌfɛtl̥] are to the west of Holuhraun, with Dyngjuháls [ˈtiɲcʏˌhauls] and Trölladyngja beyond. The Dyngjujökull glacier, which is part of Vatnajökull, is to the immediate south. Holuhraun is about 15 km (9.3 mi) south of the Askja caldera, and the Bárðarbunga volcano is 41.39 km (25.7 mi) to the south-west of Holuhraun. Holuhraun is traversed by an unnumbered road, which connects to the Route F910 gravel road at both the east and the west ends.

== Volcanism ==
Located at the northern and southern extensions of the Bárðarbunga and Askja fissure systems respectively, the soil is mainly composed of lavas derived from these volcanoes, either in the form of flows or alluvial deposits of volcanic origin. The geological configuration, along with the presence of nearby subglacial volcanoes such as Bárðarbunga and Grímsvötn, is responsible for the risk of jökulhlaups, which have affected Holuhraun repeatedly.

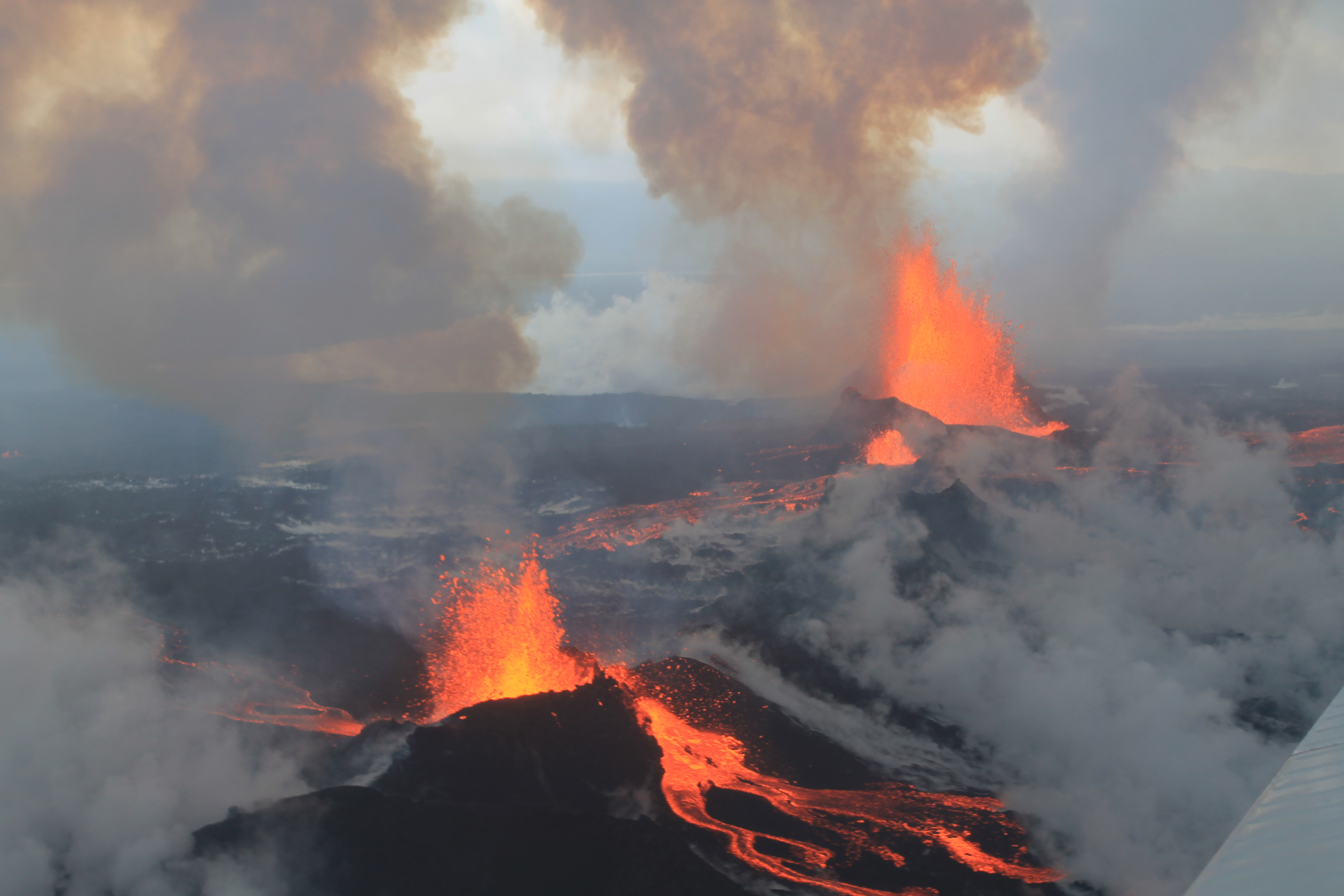
The eruption in Holuhraun on 4 September 2014

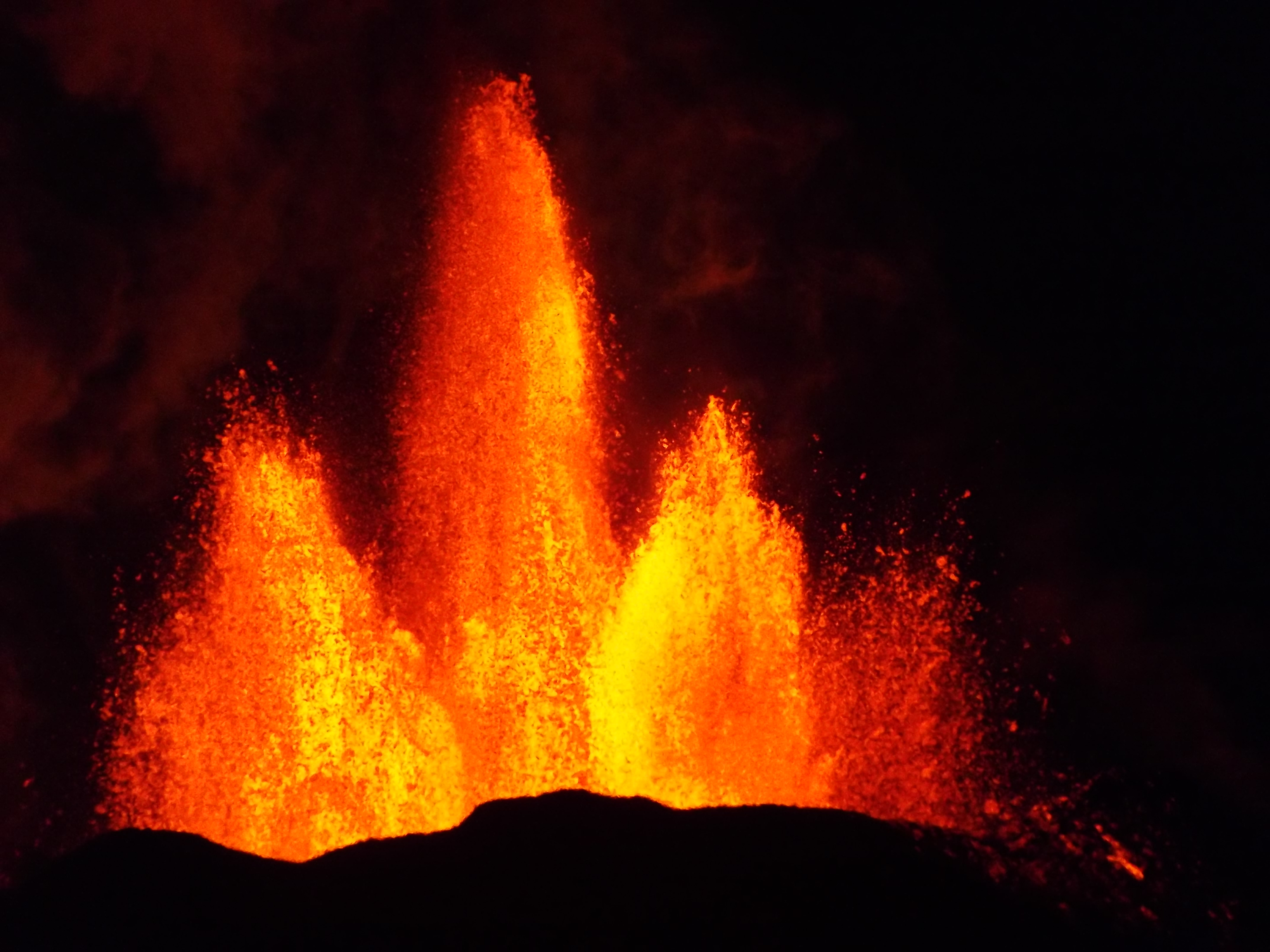
Lava fountains of the fissure eruption in Holuhraun on 13 September 2014 around 21:20.

Until 2014, the surface of the lava field was of an older lava flow, which was assumed to have erupted from a vent associated with Askja in 1797, but this is no longer accepted. (Note: There is now known to be overlap in compositional studies, and work is ongoing to understand this overlap region where vents may be some distance from the magma reservoir, fissure swarms may overlap and the Bárðarbunga volcanic system appears to have been much more productive than once assumed. The 1797 composition is very similar to that of 2014, and the 1797 flow was reassigned to the Bárðarbunga system on this basis. All sources on this issue prior to 2015 assigning the 1797 flow to Askja on the assumption of geographical proximity appear to be inconsistent with the compositional analysis data in the peer reviewed literature available to date, and the distance of lateral dyke intrusions possible from Bárðarbunga.) In the early hours of 29 August 2014, a small fissure eruption occurred in Holuhraun at the northern end of a magma intrusion which had moved progressively north, since 16 August, from the Bárðarbunga volcano. The progression of the magma intrusion was accompanied by an earthquake swarm. The eruption began just after midnight and stopped at 04:00 GMT. The active fissure was about 600 m (660 yd) in length.

Another fissure eruption started in Holuhraun at around 05:05 GMT on the morning of 31 August 2014, in the same rift as the eruption which had occurred two days earlier. The eruptive fissure was estimated to be 1.5 km (0.93 mi) long. By 4 September, the total area of the lava flow was estimated at 10.8 km^{2} (4.2 mi^{2}). Two new eruptive fissures formed south of the main eruption site, on 5 September. The new fissures were substantially smaller than the older fissure. By 7 September, the lava flow had extended 11 km (6.8 mi) to the north, and had reached the main western branch of the Jökulsá á Fjöllum river. The eruption showed no visible activity in the southern fissure, on the evening of 7 September. The lava flow is considered to be the largest in recent decades in Iceland and covered 44 km^{2} (17 mi^{2}) on 29 September. The volcanic eruption in Holuhraun continued with similar intensity as the previous few weeks. The lava field covered 63 km^{2} (24 mi^{2}) in late October. On 11 November, it was reported that the lava field extended to 70 km^{2} (27 mi^{2}) and more than 1 km^{3} (0.24 mi^{3}) in volume - the largest in Iceland since the Laki eruption of 1783.

The eruption ended on 27 February 2015. The Holuhraun lava field measures more than 85 km^{2} (33 mi^{2}) and the volume is around 1.6 km^{3} (0.38 mi^{3}).

Several names were proposed for the new lava field in the Holuhraun area, among them Flæðahraun, Nornahraun, and Urðarbruni. Finally, the decision was to keep the existing name Holuhraun, which is also consistent with current geological thought.

== See also ==
- Volcanism of Iceland
  - List of volcanic eruptions in Iceland
  - List of volcanoes in Iceland
