= 2014–2015 eruption of Bárðarbunga =

Icelandic volcano eruption

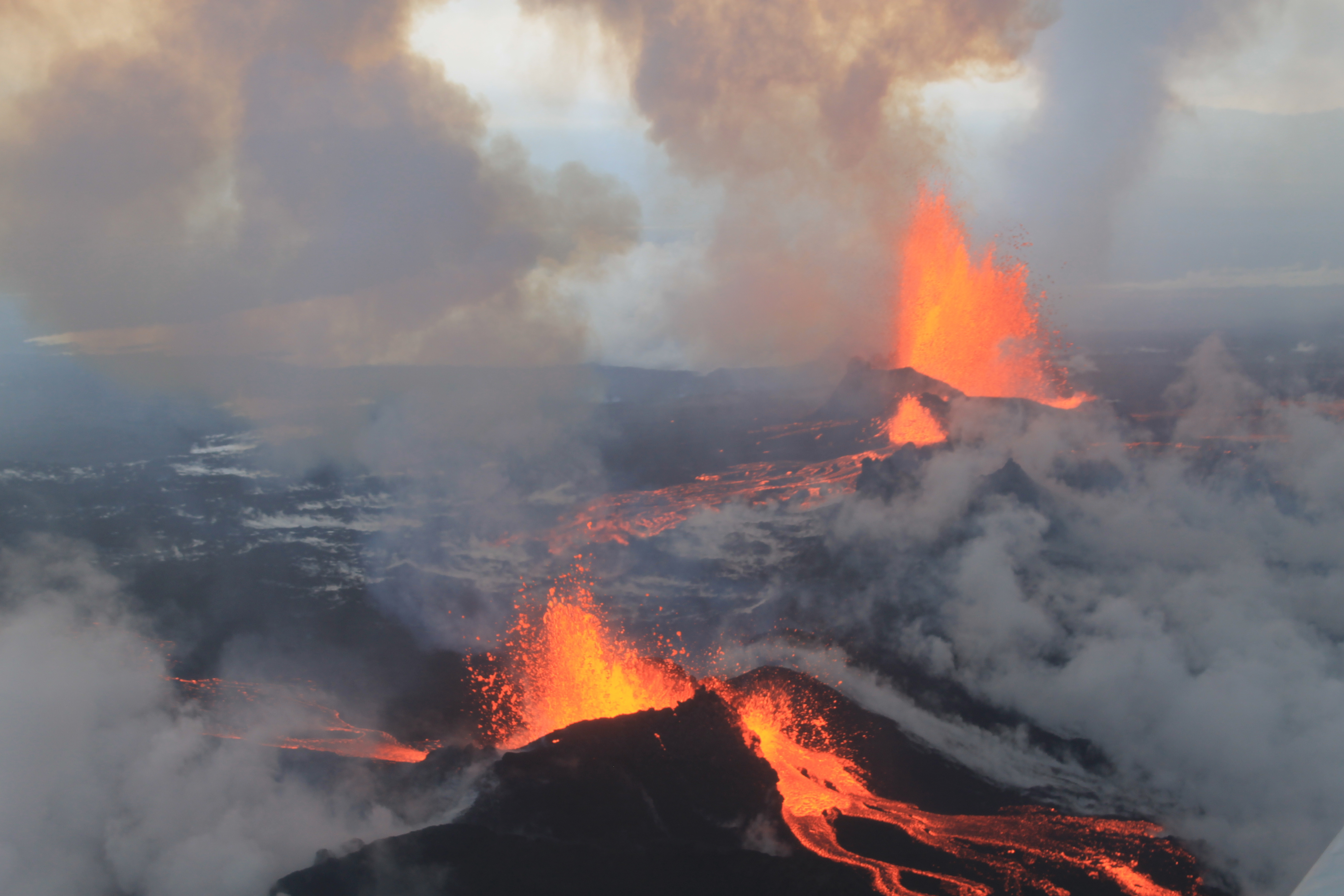
- Eruption at Holuhraun, 4 September 2014
- Volcano: Bárðarbunga
- Start date: 29 August 2014
- End date: 27 February 2015
- Type: Hawaiian
- Location: East Volcanic Zone, Iceland; 64.85°N 16.83°W
- Area: 54.1 square kilometres (20.9 mi^{2})
- VEI: 0
- Impact: Air pollution

Maps
- Geological features near the Bárðarbunga volcanic system with its relevant central volcano outlined in red. The Holuhraun lava flow extent from the 2014–15 eruption is a deep shade of purple, while other older Bárðarbunga associated lava flows are pale violet. Shading also shows: calderas, other central volcanoes, fissure swarms, subglacial terrain above 1,100 m (3,600 ft) and seismically active areas between 1995 and 2007. Clicking on the image enables full window and mouse-over with more detail.

The 2014–2015 eruption of Bárðarbunga was a Hawaiian eruption in the Bárðarbunga volcanic system in Iceland, that began on 29 August 2014, and ended on 27 February 2015. The eruption emitted large volumes of sulphur dioxide and impacted air quality in Iceland. There was no effect on flights outside of the immediate vicinity due to a lack of a significant emission of volcanic ash. The eruption took place in the lava field of Holuhraun northeast of the Bárðarbunga caldera proper.

== Overview ==
Seismic activity surrounding the Bárðarbunga volcano gradually increased from 2007 to 2014, with a brief pause during the nearby eruption at Grímsvötn in 2011. By the summer of 2014 activity reached a level similar to that just before the Grímsvötn eruption. In May 2014 there was a small earthquake sequence of about 200 events. GPS data recorded a displacement of 14 cm in the region since the beginning of the phase of unrest, compared to a figure of 2 cm over the rest of Iceland. This displacement is attributed to the separation of two continental plates: the Eurasian Plate in the east and the North American Plate in the west. Further earthquake swarms were detected: one at Bárðarbunga caldera, attributed to subsidence due to the magma chamber emptying; and another at the head of a dyke which extends approximately 40 km outwards from the vent, at a depth of 5–8 km below the surface. Evidence of minor sub-glacial eruptions occurred as early as 23 August when tremors were detected, but it was not until 29 August when lava erupted onto the surface at the fissure, forming a crater and substantial lava field to the north of the glacier in Holuhraun.

== Possible scenarios ==
Scientists at the Icelandic Met Office and the University of Iceland outlined three possible scenarios:

- The eruption in Holuhraun lasts until the subsidence of the Bárðarbunga caldera stops. It can go on for many months.
- A sub-glacial eruption somewhere along the dyke, which could produce an explosion, eject ash, and create a glacial outburst flood.
- An eruption within the caldera itself with similar consequences to that of the above sub-glacial eruption.

== Activity in 2014 ==
=== August ===
==== Seismic activity prior to eruption ====
A swarm of 1600 earthquakes with an average magnitude of 1.5 up to 3 began at 03:00 on 16 August 2014. There were "very strong indications of ongoing magma movement, in connection with dyke intrusion" according to the Icelandic Meteorological Office. The activity was in fact two swarms; one located east of Bárðarbunga caldera; and one at the edge of Dyngjujökull glacier just east of Kistufell. The Aviation Color Code was raised to Yellow. By 18 August about 2600 earthquakes were detected, with some larger than magnitude 3, the largest of which being of magnitude 4.5. The Aviation Color Code was raised to Orange. The majority of events were recorded at a depth of 5–10 km.

On 23 August an intense low-frequency signal was detected which led scientists to believe that a small eruption was in progress under the Dyngjujökull glacier. As a result of this the Aviation Color Code was elevated to a maximum Red, signifying that an eruption was either imminent or in progress and that a no-fly zone was in effect for planes to the south-east of Iceland.

Three magnitude 5 earthquakes, the strongest in Iceland since 1996, were recorded on 24 August, with the first at 00:09, but there were no visible signs of activity. "Probably, earthquakes near the Bárðarbunga caldera are a consequence of adjustment to changes in pressure, because of the flow of magma from under the caldera into the dyke which stretches to Dyngjujökull, more than 25 km away." Following a scientists' meeting at 11:50, the Aviation Color Code was reduced to Orange. It was stated that 700 earthquakes of larger magnitudes than previously recorded had been observed since midnight; the dyke stretching to the north was estimated at 30 km in length; activity showed no signs of abating and an imminent eruption was considered possible; the intense low frequency signal detected on 23 August was not caused by a sub-glacial eruption.

By 19:00 on 25 August there had been about 1200 earthquakes at depths of 5–12 km, mostly around the northern tip of the intrusion northeast of Bárðarbunga which had migrated further to 6–7 km north of Dyngjujökull. More than twenty tremors were of intensity M3–M4, and one was a M5.1 which occurred within the caldera at 16:19. There was no sign of volcanic harmonic tremor.

On 26 August, intense seismic activity continued, with no signs of reduction and approximately 900 events recorded by 18:00. The largest earthquake since the 2014 activity began occurred at 01:26, a M5.7 on the north-west rim of the caldera at a depth of 6 km. The dyke continued to extend to the north, reaching 40 km from the caldera and 5 km past the edge of the glacier. Activity was concentrated at the tip, which now extended across an area of 10 km. GPS modelling showed that fifty million cubic metres of magma had been injected into the dyke in the previous 24 hours, reaching a total volume of 350 million cubic metres.

By 18:42 on 27 August there had been two earthquakes in the caldera above M5 and about 1300 events in the range of M2-3 around the tip of the dyke which had propagated a further 1 km to the north and now extended some 13 km past the edge of the glacier. Approximately another 20 million cubic metres of magma had entered the dyke over the previous 24 hours. The intrusion of the dyke was now causing stress changes over a large area to the north of the dyke's extent. A M4.5 event was recorded just east of the Askja caldera, which had been showing signs of increased geothermal activity since April 2012. At 20:50, scientists on a surveillance flight reported a 4–6 km line of 10–15 m deep cauldrons to the south of the Bárðarbunga caldera, which were possibly a result of melting or a sub glacial eruption, although they didn't know when they had formed. No heightened tremor level was observed.

==== Eruption ====
On 29 August at 00:02, seismic tremor observations indicated lava had erupted approximately 5 km north of the margin of the Dyngjujökull glacier and confirmed by visual observations. The fissure eruption breached the surface between Bárðarbunga and Askja, close to the northernmost point of the earthquake swarm, in the Holuhraun lava field 42 km to the northeast of the caldera.

The active fissure was about 600 metres long and produced a lava flow which peaked between 00:40 and 01:00 and is thought to have ceased by 04:00. Seismicity decreased during the eruption but then returned to previous levels. At 10:00 the Aviation Color Code was downgraded to Orange, signifying no hazard from an ash cloud.

At 04:00 on 31 August another fissure eruption began along the same fissure previously, estimated to be about 1.5 km long. By 07:00 the lava flow was 1 km wide and 3 km long, extending to the north-east and several metres thick; the lava output was approximately 1000 cubic metres per second. Gas emissions had increased but no ash cloud was detected. At about 13:00 a M5.1 earthquake occurred in the caldera. GPS measurements showed continuing changes to the north of the eruption, seismic activity had decreased but was otherwise similar to previous days.

=== September ===
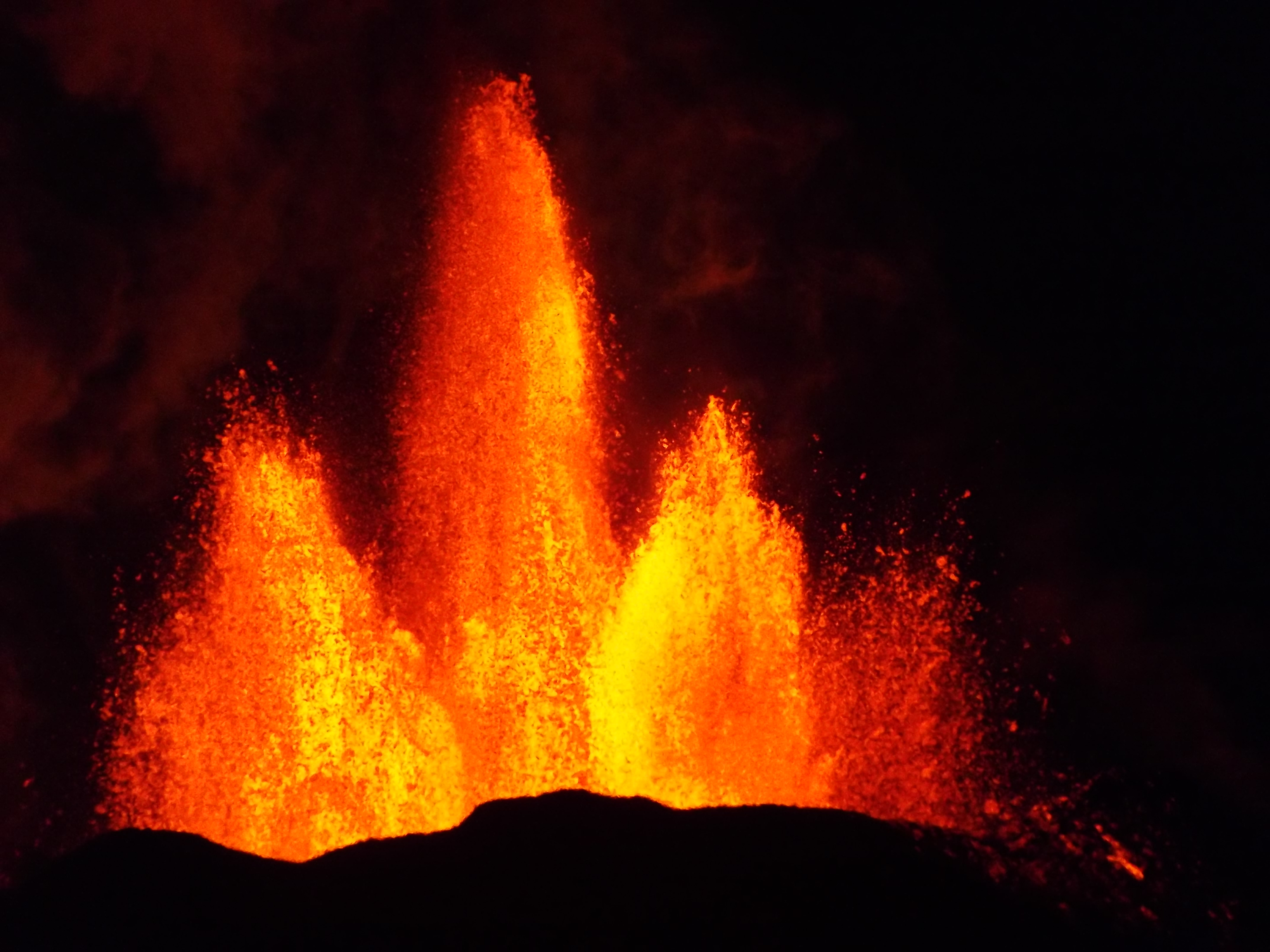
Lava fountains on September 13th 2014.

On 1 September, the fissure in Holuhraun erupted continuously along its 600–800 m central section. The lava stretched over 4 square kilometres with an estimated volume of 20-30 million cubic metres, with a 5-10 million cubic metres increase over the previous 19 hours, the average output was about 100 cubic metres per second. A white plume rose from the eruption reaching 15,000 feet and extending 60 km NNE; no ash but high levels of sulphur dioxide were recorded. In the next days, eruptions continued with the lava covering 12 square kilometres on 5 September. Reduced seismic activity continued along similar lines with activity near the tip of the dyke and larger earthquakes in the caldera.

At 07:00 on 5 September two new smaller eruptions appeared in a graben to the south of the ongoing eruption about 2 km from Dyngjujökull glacier. The cauldron at Dyngjujökull appeared to have grown. Low frequency tremors continued to be detected and substantial emission of sulphur dioxide from the eruptions continued.

On 6 September, radar measurements of the glacier surface within the caldera showed 15 metres of subsidence, a volume change of 0.25 square kilometres. This was the largest observed subsidence in Iceland since records began in the middle of the last century. A wide shallow depression was also observed at the Dyngjujökull glacier 10 km from the ice margin, another depression 6 km from the margin deepened to 35 metres. These were likely caused by small and short sub-glacial eruptions.

The fissure eruptions continued, producing 100–200 m^{3}/s of lava which covered about 16 km^{2} by 7 September. Lava had now reached the western part of the Jökulsá á Fjöllum river.

Follow-up measurements on 8 September indicated that since 6 September the glacier had subsided another 2.5 to 3 metres. The University of Iceland said that "The events in Bárðarbunga can only be described as a slow caldera collapse".

On 9 and 10 September, earthquakes continued to be recorded at Bárðarbunga caldera with a M5.5 at 05:28 on the 10th in the northern part of the dyke intrusion, and also at Herðubreiðatögl [ˈhɛrðʏˌpreiːðaˌtʰœkl̥]. Lava was flowing into the Jökulsá á Fjöllum river, but there was no explosive reaction, only steaming. Continued sulphur dioxide emissions at the eruption sites prompted concerns about air quality in urban areas in eastern Iceland. According to GPS measurements, most of the magma flowing into the dyke was being erupted without further crustal deformation. Forecast scenarios now included references to possible further subsidence in the caldera prompting eruptions beneath the Dyngjujökull glacier.

In the following days, the eruption in Holuhraun continued at a similar rate, accompanied by ongoing earthquakes. The caldera continued to subside with regular M5 earthquakes each day. Regions experiencing reduced air quality changed depending on wind direction. In the previous two days GPS monitoring had detected unusual crustal movements which may have been indicative of a change in the movement of magma under the volcano. In the month since earthquakes began at Bárðarbunga, 25,000 earthquakes had been recorded, compared to 10,000-15,000 earthquakes recorded throughout Iceland in an average year.

By 21 September, subsidence in the caldera, as measured at the newly mounted GPS station, was approximately 40 cm per day and appeared to coincide with earthquake activity. Lava flow and gas emissions at the eruption site in Holuhraun continued at the same strength. The lava field now extended to 37 square kilometres, with an estimated 0.4-0.5 cubic km of erupted lava.

=== October ===
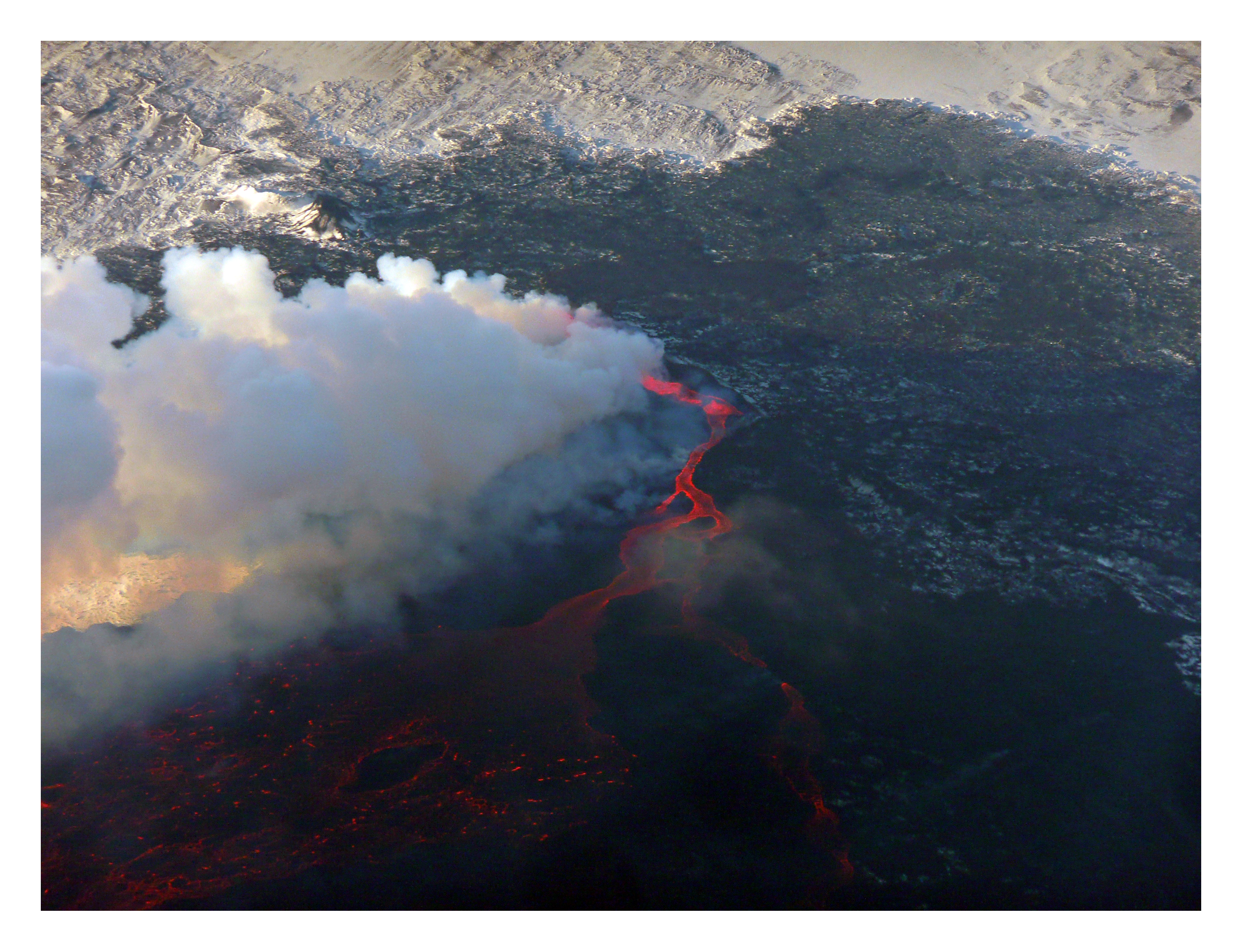
Activity on 21 October 2014

Seismic activity continued to be strong in October. The eruption continued apace, subsidence of the caldera continued at about 40 cm per day and the earthquakes continued with regular M5 tremors around the caldera rim and smaller tremors at the eruption site. Larger volumes of sulphur dioxide were emitted. A crater named Baugur and a new lava flow to the east formed at the eruption site in Holuhraun. Geothermal heat was on the increase and the depression in the caldera was 40 metres, subsidence continued at a similar rate to previous weeks. A cauldron in the south-east corner of Bárðarbunga deepened 25 metres in one month and was considered by scientists at the site to be linked to the depression in the caldera. Seismic activity continued in the dyke although at a reduced rate. GPS measurements around the area of activity showed minor changes. Air quality continued to be affected by the eruption.

=== November ===
Volcanic activity remained intense although there were some signs of decrease. Earthquakes continued at the dyke although at a declining frequency, while earthquakes of magnitude 5 and greater continued at the caldera. The rate of subsidence of the caldera had declined from 80 cm a day at the start of the unrest to 25 cm per day, reaching 50 metres in total. The lava field covered 76 km and had an estimated volume of 1 cubic kilometre volume, making it the largest eruption in Iceland since Laki in 1783 and the third largest lava field on Earth over this period. The lava output reduced from 200 cubic metres per second in September to 100 m³/s in November. Significant sulphur dioxide gas pollution continued to occur. The forecast was for significant activity to continue over the next few months.

=== December ===
An overview of the eruption and seismic activity so far was published on IMO's website on 3 December. Insubstantial changes in the eruption occurred in December 2014. The lava field had increased to 82.8 km^{2}. The lava ran in a closed channel to the east 15 km from the Baugur crater. M5+ quakes continued in the caldera; on 19 December, vertical displacement at the caldera was measured at 56 metres. The eruption continued to emit intense sulphurous gasses which affected air quality throughout Iceland, depending on the weather conditions. On 25 December, a new earthquake sequence was recorded at the Geysir geothermal field 140 kilometres west of Bárðarbunga; the activity lasted for two days before fading out.

== Activity in 2015 ==
=== January ===
During January 2015 the eruption continued to decline slowly although it still remained active with significant seismic activity. At the caldera there were still significant regular quakes of M4.5+ and subsidence continued. Sulphuric gases originating from the eruption continued to create a health hazard throughout Iceland. A scientific report published on 30 January featuring graphs and diagrams showing detailed information about the caldera seismicity and eruption can be found on the IMO website. Extrapolations from the data predict the eruption may continue into the Summer.

=== February ===
In February the eruption continued to decline but seismic activity was still significant, with earthquakes no greater than magnitude M3, some earthquakes were recorded at Tungnafellsjökul glacier, Askja and Herðubreið. The rate of subsidence of the caldera was slower at about 5 cm per day and levels of toxic gasses in inhabited areas stayed within safety limits for consistent periods. On 27 February the eruption ended after 6 months of continuous activity. Nevertheless, air pollution continued, and the area north of Bárðarbunga, including volcanoes Askja and Herðubreið, still remained closed to visitors.

=== March ===
On 16 March 2015, the area north of Bárðarbunga was opened to visitors, excluding the lava field and the area within 20 metres around it.

== See also ==
- 2010 eruptions of Eyjafjallajökull
- List of volcanoes in Iceland
- List of volcanic eruptions in Iceland
- Timeline of volcanism on Earth
- Volcanology of Iceland
