= Tungnafellsjökull =

Glacier and volcano in Iceland

- Vonarskarð
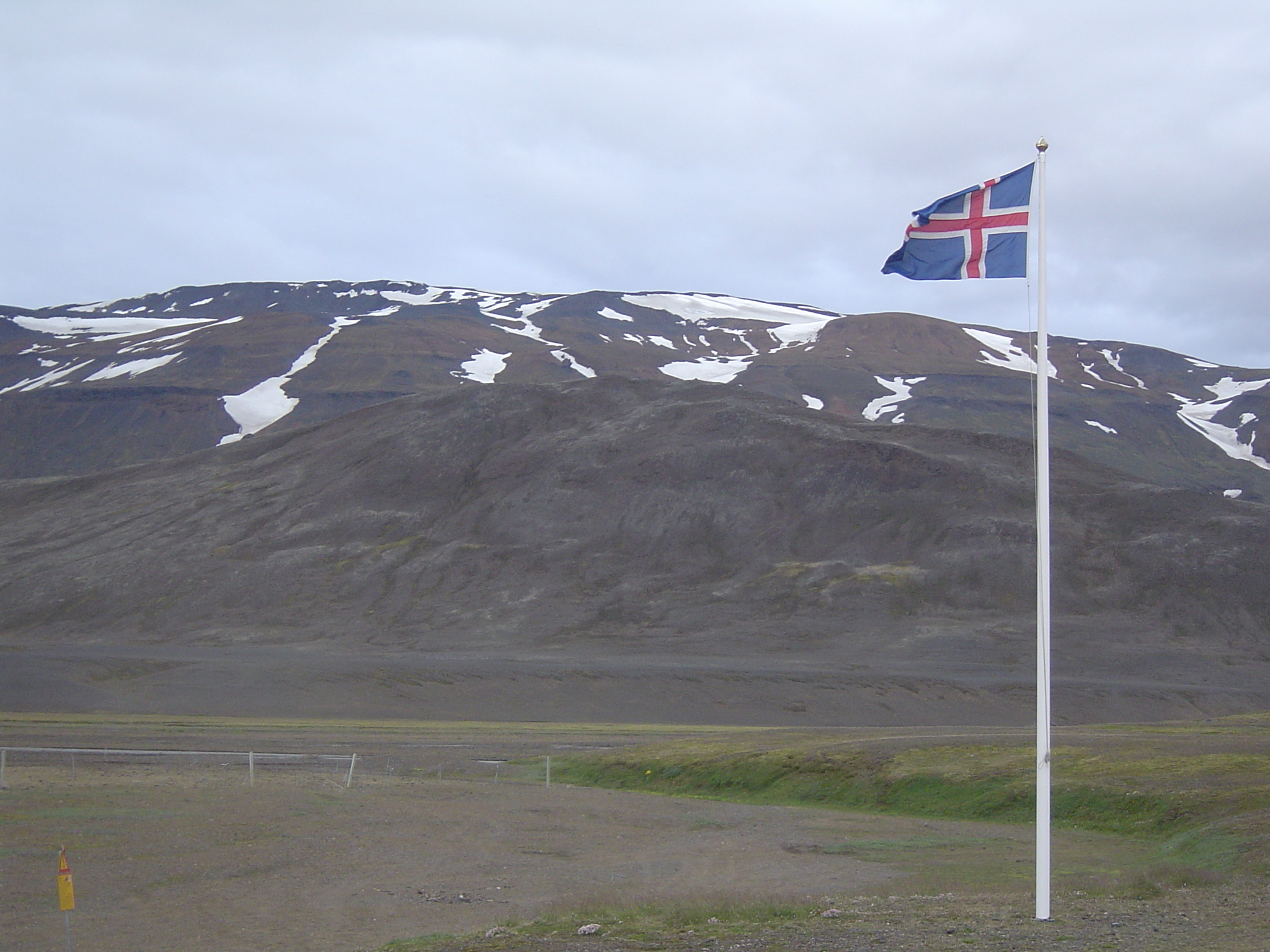
- Tungnafellsjökull and the Icelandic flags

Highest point
- Elevation: 1,523 m (4,997 ft)
- Prominence: 700 m (2,300 ft)
- Coordinates: 64°45′00″N 17°54′58″W

Geography
- Location within Iceland
- Geological features near the Tungnafellsjökull and Hágöngur central volcanoes and Tungnafellsjökull volcanic system (red outlines). Legend: Other shading shows: calderas; central volcanoes; fissure swarms; subglacial terrain above 1,100 m (3,600 ft); seismically active areas; Clicking on the rectangle in the image enlarges to full window and enables mouse-over with more detail.
- Location: Iceland

Geology
- Rock age: Pleistocene
- Mountain type: Icelandic stratovolcano
- Last eruption: Holocene, within last 4500 years.

Tungnafellsjökull (Icelandic pronunciation: [ˈtʰuŋnaˌfɛlsˌjœːkʏtl̥, ˈtʰunːa-], "Tungna-fells glacier" or "tongue-fells glacier") is a icecap glacier upon a volcano of the same name in Iceland. The volcano is also known as Vonarskarð.

== Geography ==
It has an elevation of 1,523 metres (4,997 ft) and is located north–west of the area of the Vatnajökull glacier under the Bárðarbunga central volcano. To its west is the volcano of Hofsjökull.

The Tungnafellsjökull volcanic system is located in a desert area that is fairly inaccessible, with little vegetation, and large areas of sand and sandy ridges.

Three glacial rivers drain the Tungnafellsjökull glacier.

== Geology ==
It is the eastern most part of the Mid-Iceland belt and thus at the north–eastern corner of the Hreppar microplate. There are two central volcanoes, with the most southern being called Hágöngur and the most northern called here Tungnafellsjökull. (Note: Some authors have separated the Tungnafellsjökull and Vonarskarð volcanoes, although this is not normal practice, and appears inconsistent with the compositional analysis figures available since the split was postulated.) Tungnafellsjökull has two calderas, with the western most 4 km × 9 km (2.5 mi × 5.6 mi) Tungnafellsjökull caldera being topped by a glacier and the eastern most Vonarskarð caldera facing towards Bárðarbunga having a geothermal field, and being the younger caldera. The system formed in the Pleistocene and deposits from this time extend from the present edge of the Vatnajökull glacier.

The fissure swarms of the Tungnafellsjökull–Vonarskarð volcanic system extend 15 km (9.3 mi) to the north and 25 km (16 mi) to the west–south–west. This later fissure swarm is associated with hyaloclastite ridges (tindars). The fissure swarms have erupted olivine tholeiite basalt which while dominant, rhyolite is also found on the south-west margin of the Vonarskarð caldera and to the north–east of the Hágöngur central volcano.

=== Activity ===
The most recent eruptions of the central volcano have been at its north–east flank where young basaltic lava flows occur, that are no more than 4500 years old. These were from the Dvergar fissure row to the north–west of the Tungnafellsjökull central volcano, being 1.18 km^{2} (0.46 sq mi) in area and 0.0036 km^{3} (0.00086 cu mi) in volume and are partly separated lava patches. A larger Holocene eruption was from the northern fissure swarm due north of the Tungnafellsjökull central volcano, that created the 12 km (7.5 mi) long Tunguhraun lava flow and the Bokki lava shield, with its area of about 210.95 km^{2} (81.45 sq mi) and volume of about 0.15 km^{3} (0.036 cu mi). (Note: This is a marked increase in area compared to the previous area assigned to the Tunguhraun (Bokki) eruption, but the thickness of the lava is thinner than previous estimates. Sources older than 2021 are outdated.)

Previously before the Holocene, while the area was under ice, lava fields erupted within the southern Vonarskarð caldera and north–west of the Hágöngur central volcano.

After the 1996 eruption of Gjálp well to the west, it was discovered that fault movements had taken place in the Tungnafellsjökull fissure swarm. Seismic swarms in 2008 and 2009 also caused faulting. Almost all recent seismic activity has been in the area adjacent to the Tungnafellsjökull central volcano, and is most consistent with magma movements at depth.

The 2014–2015 eruption of Bárðarbunga was associated with an earthquake swarm at the north–east edge of the Tungnafellsjökull central volcano, which was best modelled by stress changes due to the Bárðarbunga caldera subsidence.

== See also ==
- Volcanism of Iceland
  - List of volcanic eruptions in Iceland
  - List of volcanoes in Iceland
