= Baugur (crater) =

Coordinates: 64.85°N 16.83°W

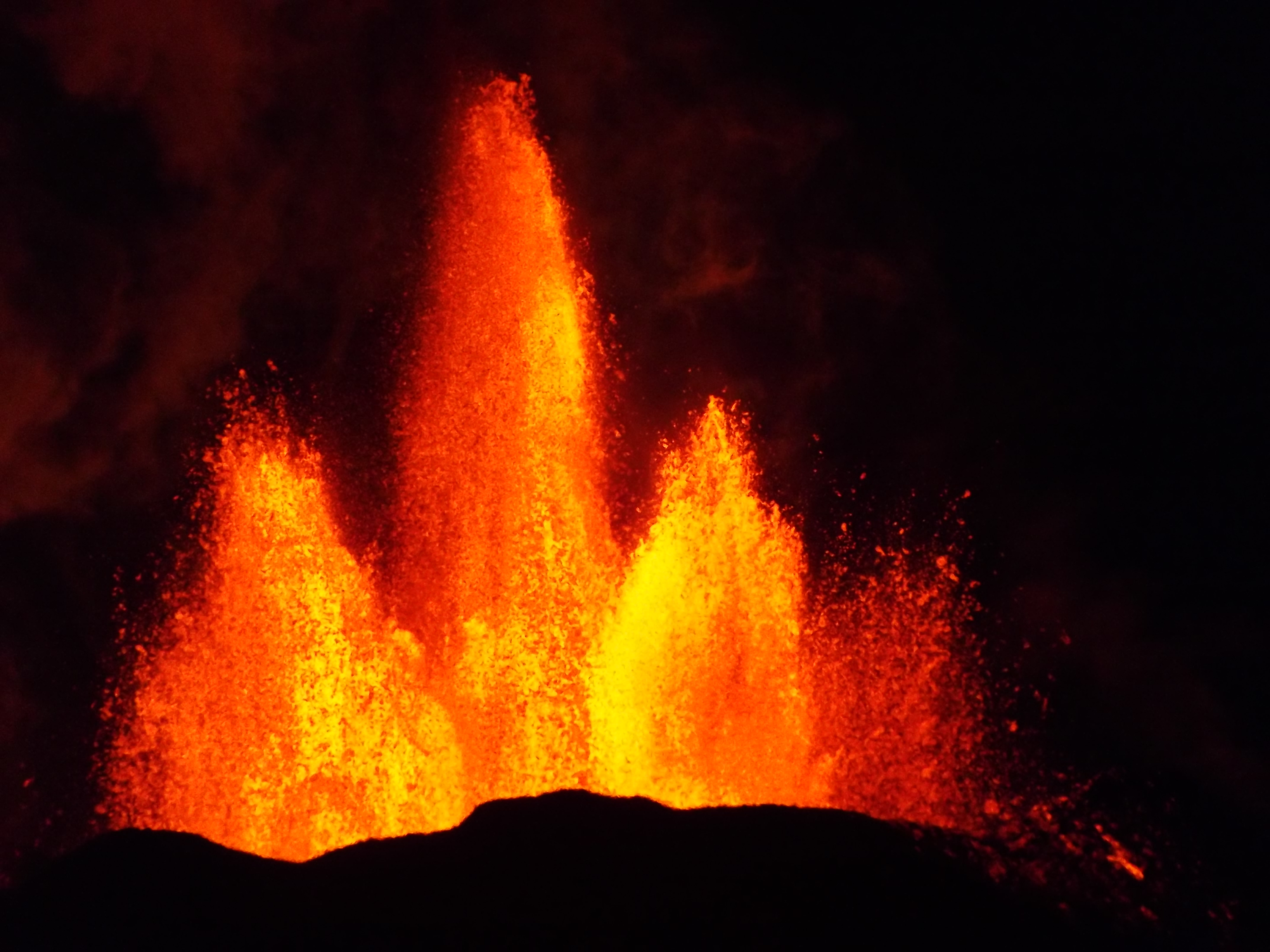
Lava fountains on 13 September 2014 at the fissure's main crater named Baugur.

Baugur [ˈpœyːɣʏr̥] is the informal name of one of three volcanic craters which have appeared as of 7 September 2014 - according to the Icelandic Meteorological Office website - in the Holuhraun lava field in Iceland as a result of an eruption in August 2014.
