= Kverkfjöll =

Volcano in Iceland

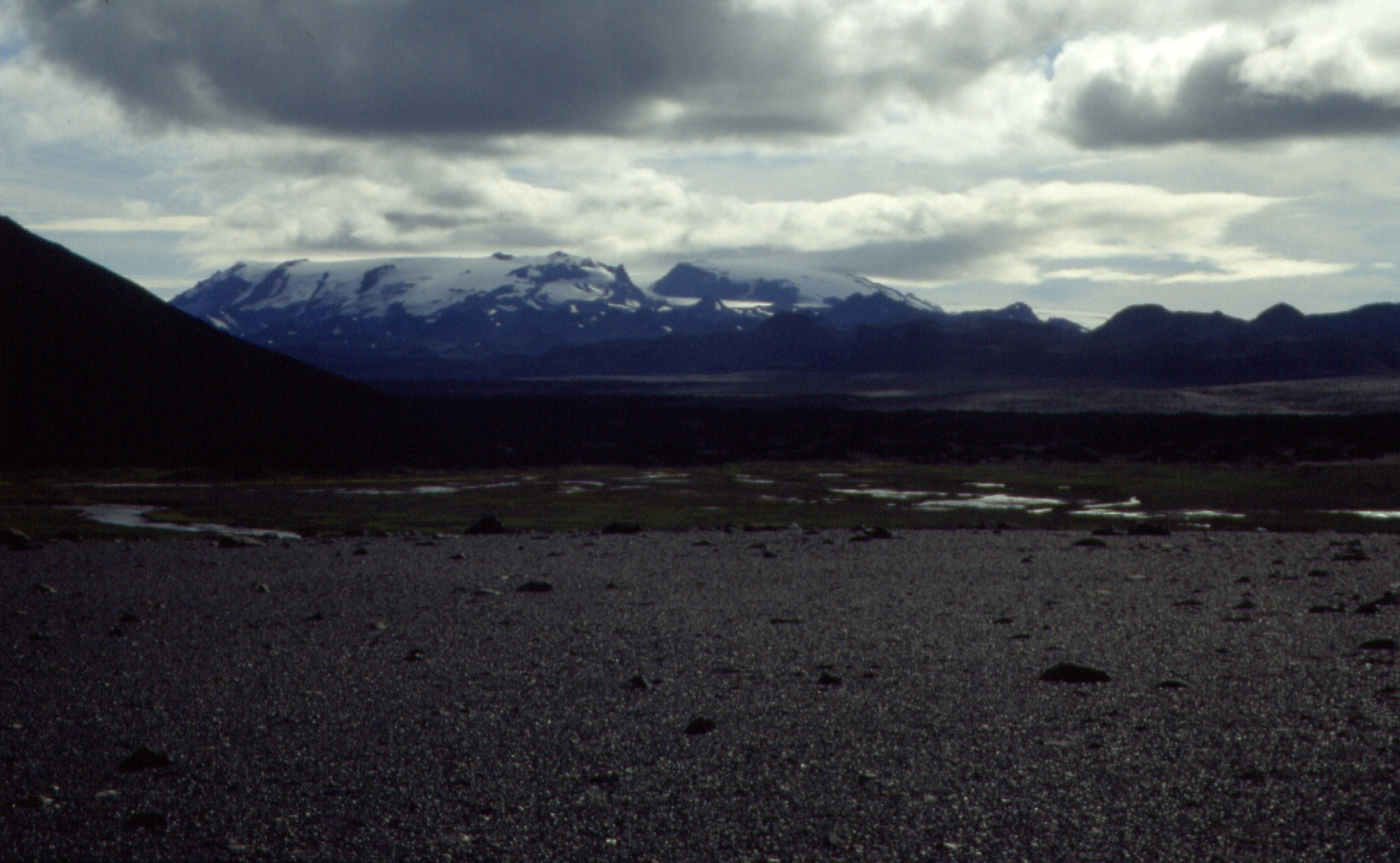

Highest point
- Elevation: 1,933 m (6,342 ft) (Note: Multiple heights exist, some possibly reflecting earlier survey inaccuracy. This region of Iceland was only mapped accurately using LiDAR, mainly between 2007 and 2013. An unreferenced height of 1764 m was given originally in this article, and there is a height of 1936 m, that is given unreferenced to an official source, in many Icelandic sources. A historic official source for Iceland gives 1920 m for Skarphéðinstindur (Skarphedinstindur, Jörfi), the height of 1930 m from the Global Volcanism Program is noted in the context that parts of this source have not been updated since 2013, so leaving the height of 1,933 m (6,342 ft), as the latest (2019) official source. Other contemporary sources use this height.)
- Prominence: 289 m (948 ft)
- Isolation: 39.62 km (24.62 mi)
- Coordinates: 64°39′00″N 16°43′00″W

Geography
- Location within Iceland
- Geological features near the Kverkfjöll volcanic system (red outlines). Legend: Other shading shows: calderas; central volcanoes; fissure swarms; subglacial terrain above 1,100 m (3,600 ft); seismically active areas; Clicking on the rectangle in the image enlarges to full window and enables mouse-over with more detail. Location in Iceland
- Location: Iceland

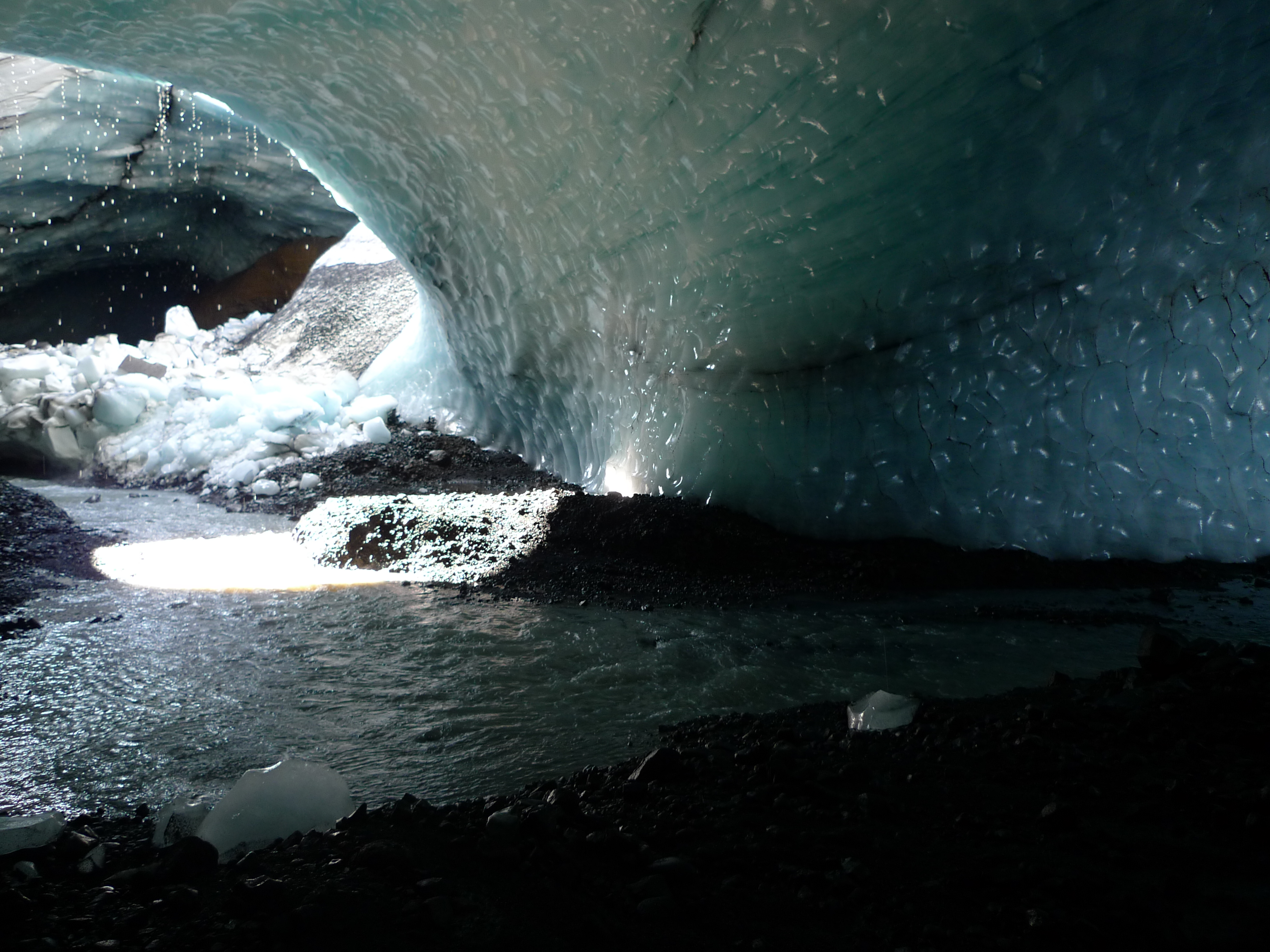
Glacier cave near Kverkfjöll.

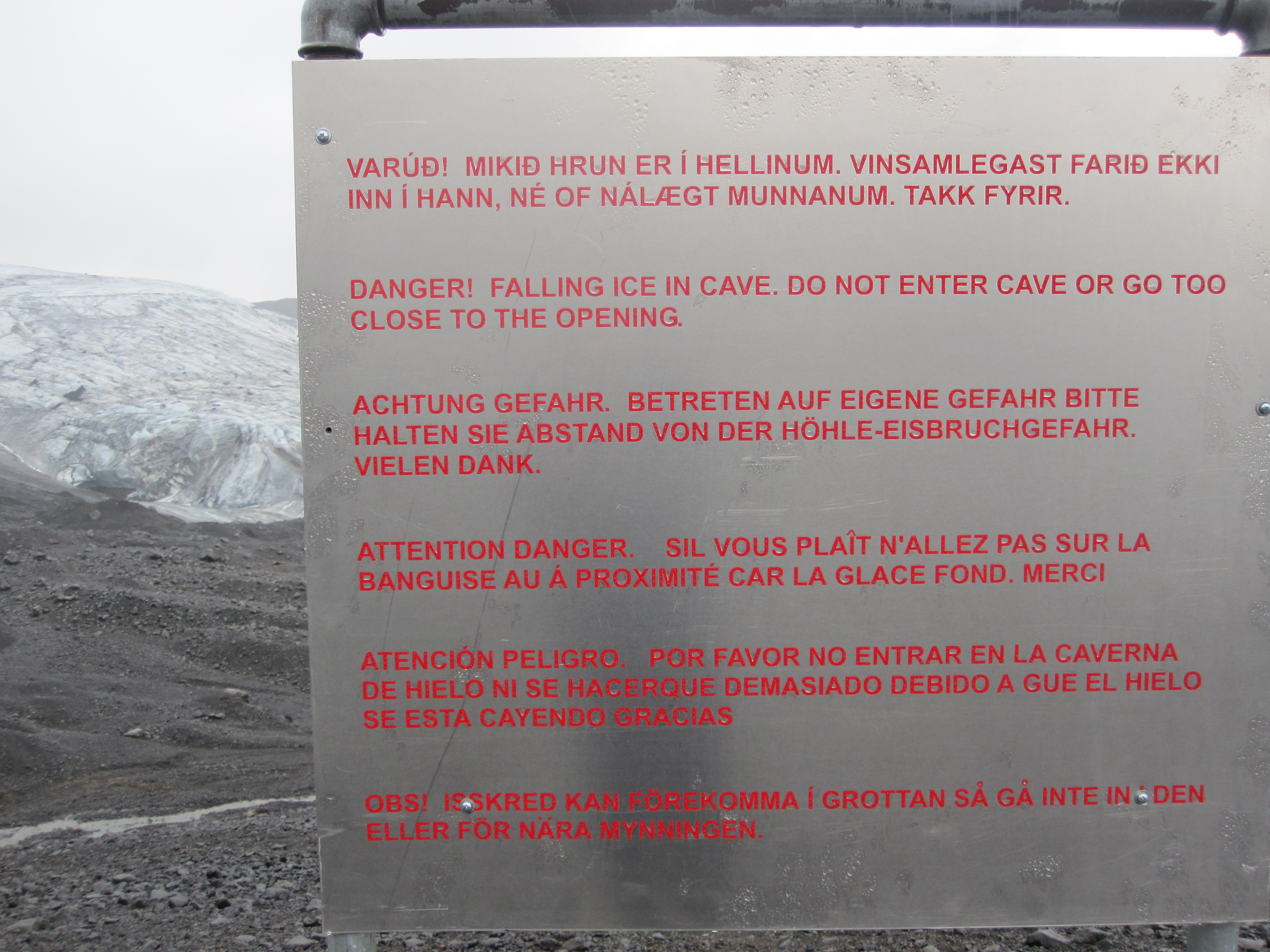
Warning text about the caves.

Kverkfjöll (Icelandic pronunciation: [ˈkʰvɛr̥kˌfjœtl̥]) is a potentially active central volcano, fissure swarm, and associated mountain range situated on the northern border of the glacier Vatnajökull in Iceland.

It is located in Vatnajökull National Park and at the glacier edge are ice caves and some geothermal features.

The main volume of the Jökulsá á Fjöllum river flows from the Kverkfjöll area. The Volga River directly drains the Kverkjökull glacier into the Jökulsá á Fjöllum. These river systems have had significant jökulhlaups during the Holocene that are related to the three active volcanic systems of Bárðarbunga, Grímsvötn and Kverkfjöll but assignment has been difficult to individual volcanic systems.

== Geography ==
The maximum elevation of the central volcano at the peak of Skarphéðinstindur is 1,933 m (6,342 ft). The central volcano is mainly situated under Kverkjökull, an outlet glacier of Vatnajökull. The Kverkjökull icecap to the north-west of Skarphéðinstindur, has a maximum elevation of 1,860 m (6,100 ft). To the west of Kverkjökull is the Dyngjujökull outlet glacier and to its east is the Skarphéðinsjökull adjacent to the Brúarjökull outlet glaciers of Vatnajökull. To the north of the central volcano there is a fissure swarm striking N20-30°E for 130 km (81 mi) and to the south of the central volcano it is possible that a subglacial fissure swarm extends for 10–25 km (6.2–15.5 mi). (Note: It is unclear if there is any relevant southern fissure swarm as this area is not seismically active. One indirect source reports the southern fissure swarm extends 10km to the south of the Kverkfjöll central volcano and another 25km.)

The area north of Kverkfjöll has been altered by large floods originating from the northern part of Vatnajökull with the heights being tindars and hyaloclastite ridges orientated towards the nor-north-east. The Holocene active volcanic fissures are mostly confined to the nor-north-east orientated Kverkfjöll fissure swarm (Kverkfjallarani western ridge), rather than the north-east orientated Kverkárnes fissure swarm (Kverkhnjúkar eastern ridge). The 2014 to 2015 erupted Holuhraun lava field is approximately 10 km (6.2 mi) to the north-west of Kverkfjöll but is related to the adjacent Bárðarbunga volcanic system.

== Geology ==
While the dominant magma is tholeiite basalt, samples of some rocks carried in the Kverkjökull glacier have been silicic and presumably originate from the central volcano, which is a stratovolcano. There is a geothermal field just beyond the western rim of the northernmost caldera. This has created ice–dammed lakes called Gengissig and Galtarlón. They are drained by the thermal Volga river. Beyond the eastern rim of the northern caldera is another thermal river, the Hveragil that drains geothermal areas along the eastern northern caldera margin. The oldest identified rocks are 780,000 years old.

The tectonic context is that the Kverkfjöll volcanic system is part of the divergent plate boundary northern volcanic zone of Iceland slightly to the north-east of the central volcanoes of the Grímsvötn and Bárdarbunga that are inferred to be closer to the Iceland mantle plume. The mantle is at about 40 km (25 mi) depth under Kverkfjöll, with lower crustal magma intrusion to pockets that are about 10 km (6.2 mi) deep, and its hydrothermal system being driven by a magma intrusion pocket about 3 km (1.9 mi) deep with the hydrothermal water reservoir being at about 2 km (1.2 mi) deep.

=== Activity ===
Tephra studies have identified up to seventy eruptions in the last 6500 years, but the volcano has been in relative repose in the last thousand years and had also been inactive for a period between 3000 and 4000 years ago. Tholeiite basalt tephra from the volcano has been found to the west from eruptions dated 5850 ± 200 and 10630 ± 150 BP. An earthquake swarm in 2007 to 2008 near Mount Upptyppingar, which is 40–50 km (25–31 mi) north-east of the Kverkfjöll central volcano was interpreted as a 0.04–0.05 km^{3} (0.0096–0.0120 cu mi) dyke intrusion. The most recent volcanic subaerial eruption occurred about 1300 years ago from the northern fissure swarm and produced a lava flow covering about 20 km^{2} (7.7 sq mi). In 2013 a jökulhlaup occurred that emptied the water-filled Gengissig depression hydrothermal area, that is located just north-west to the northern caldera. Further than the flood, due to the release of water pressure, there were subsequent significant hydrothermal explosions in the lake bed. Similar water floods or eruptions may have occurred since the mid-17th century. A hydrothermal eruption occurred in 1968, 500 m (1,600 ft) to the west of the Gengissig depression, and jökulhlaups from the Gengissig depression occurred in 2002, 1997, 1993, 1987 and 1985. Other low grade, possibly hydrothermal, eruptions assigned to the system, have occurred in 1968, 1959, 1929, 1729 (two), and 1655. At least two very large pre-history Holocene jökulhlaups that have had subsequent lava flows over them could have been generated by Kverkfjöll. Before this a tephra layer called the Fugloyarbanki tephra from 27,000 years ago came from Kverkfjöll.

Kverkfjöll and Kverkjökull
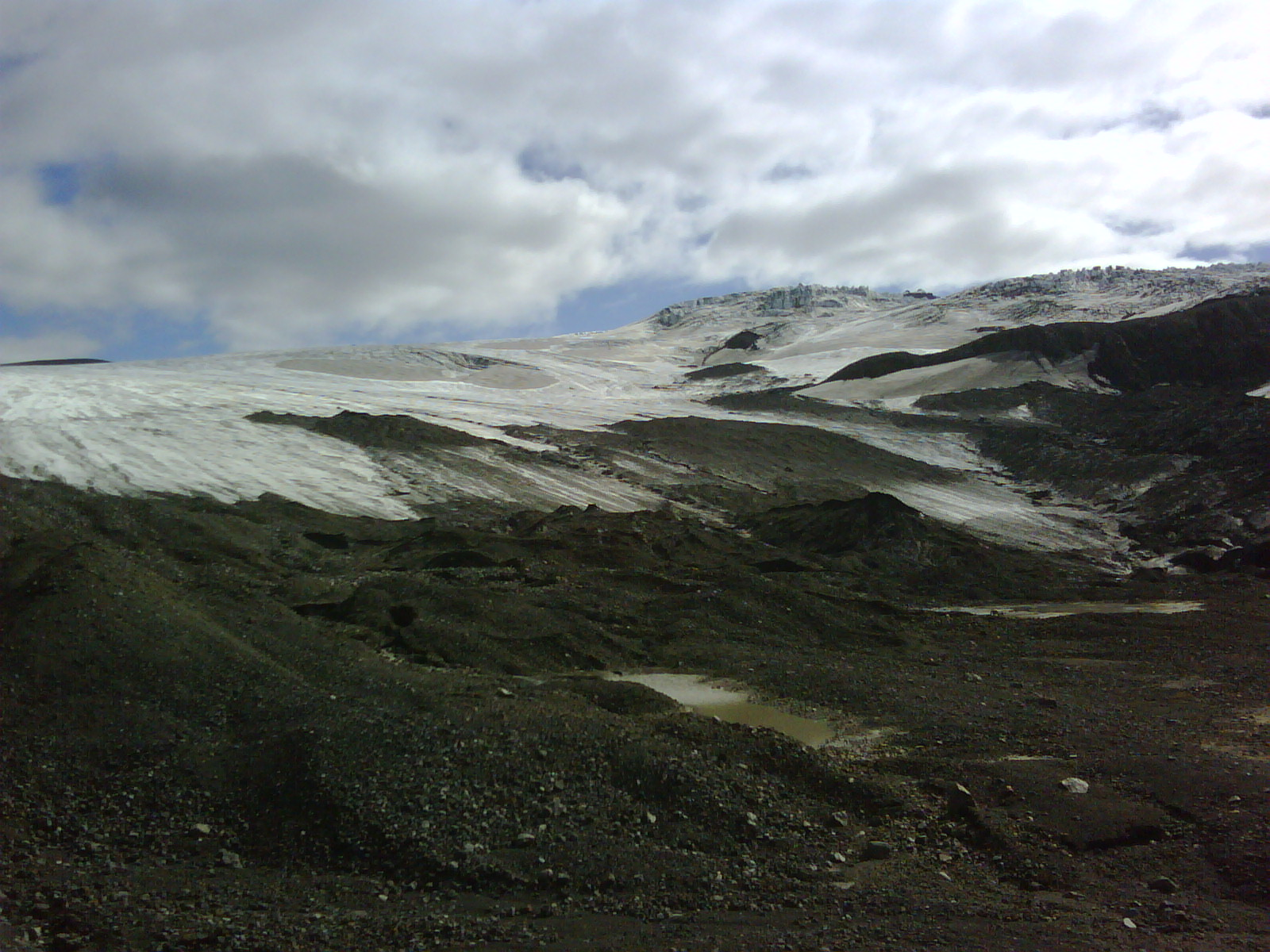
Panorama of Kverkfjöll.

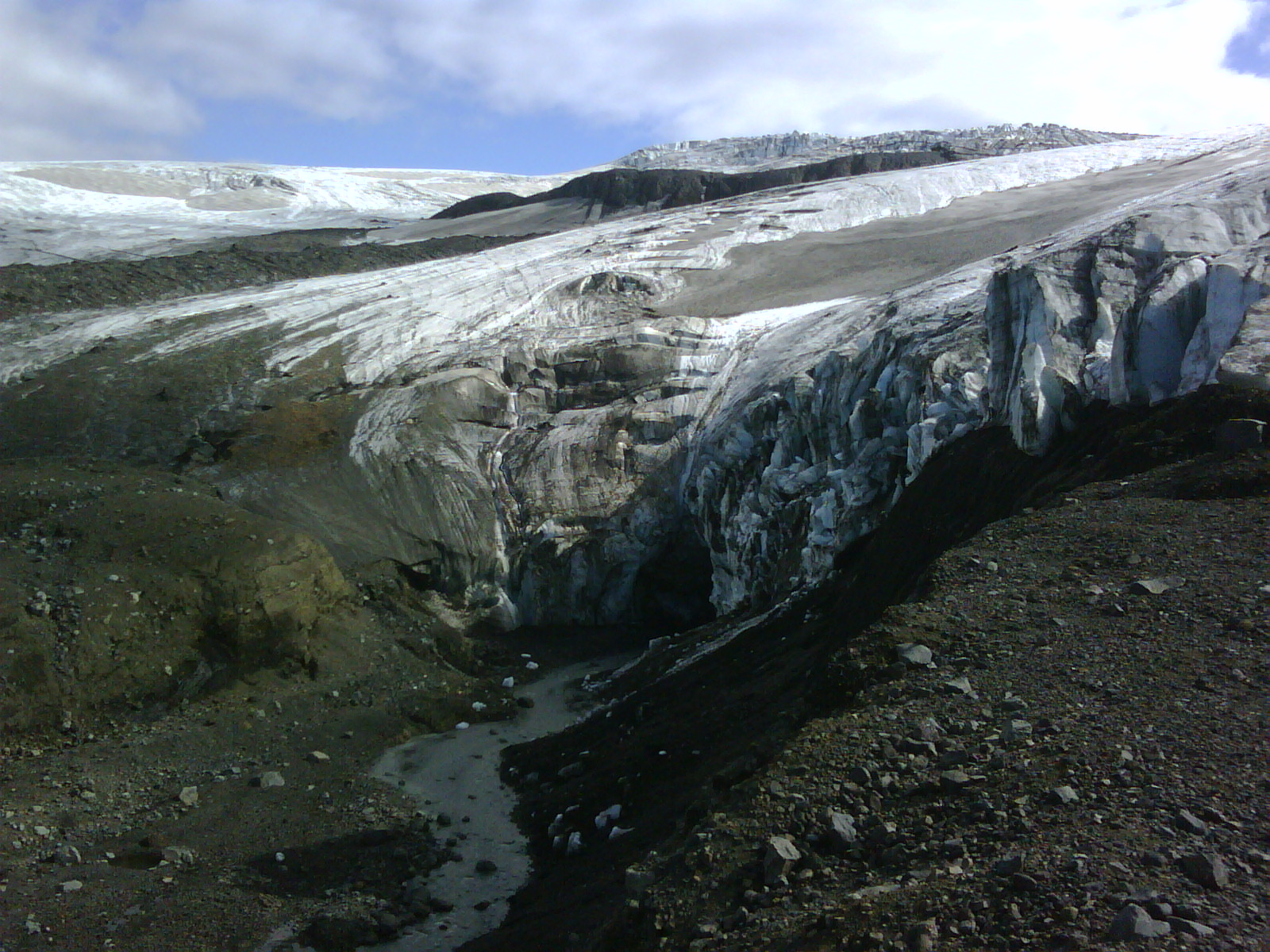
Kverkjökull.

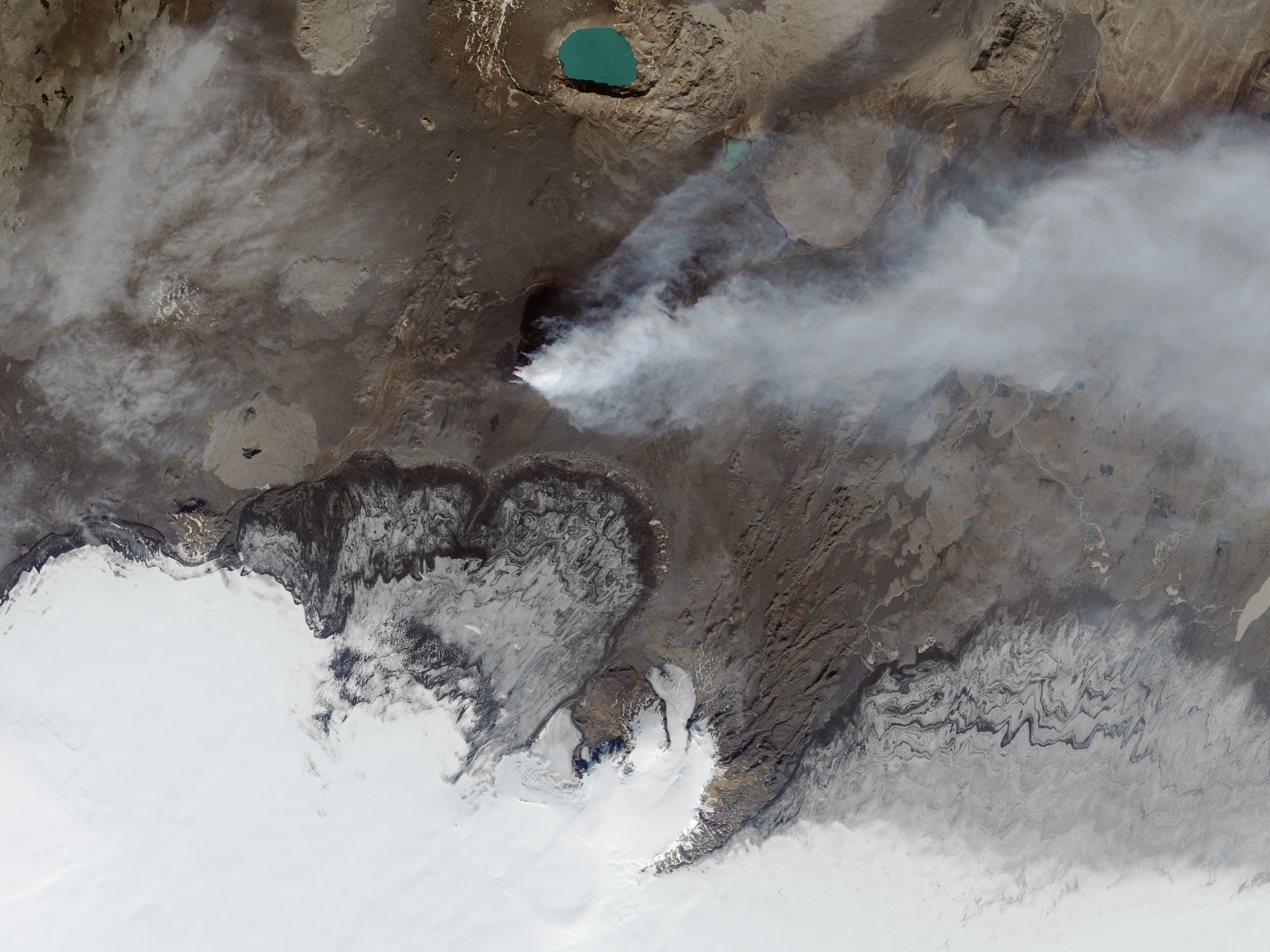
Landsat view taken at the time of the Holuhraun eruption with Kverkfjöll at centre bottom of the picture.

== See also ==
- Glaciers of Iceland
- Iceland plume
- List of lakes of Iceland
- Volcanism of Iceland
  - List of volcanic eruptions in Iceland
  - List of volcanoes in Iceland
