= Bárðarbunga =

Stratovolcano in Iceland

- Veiðivötn
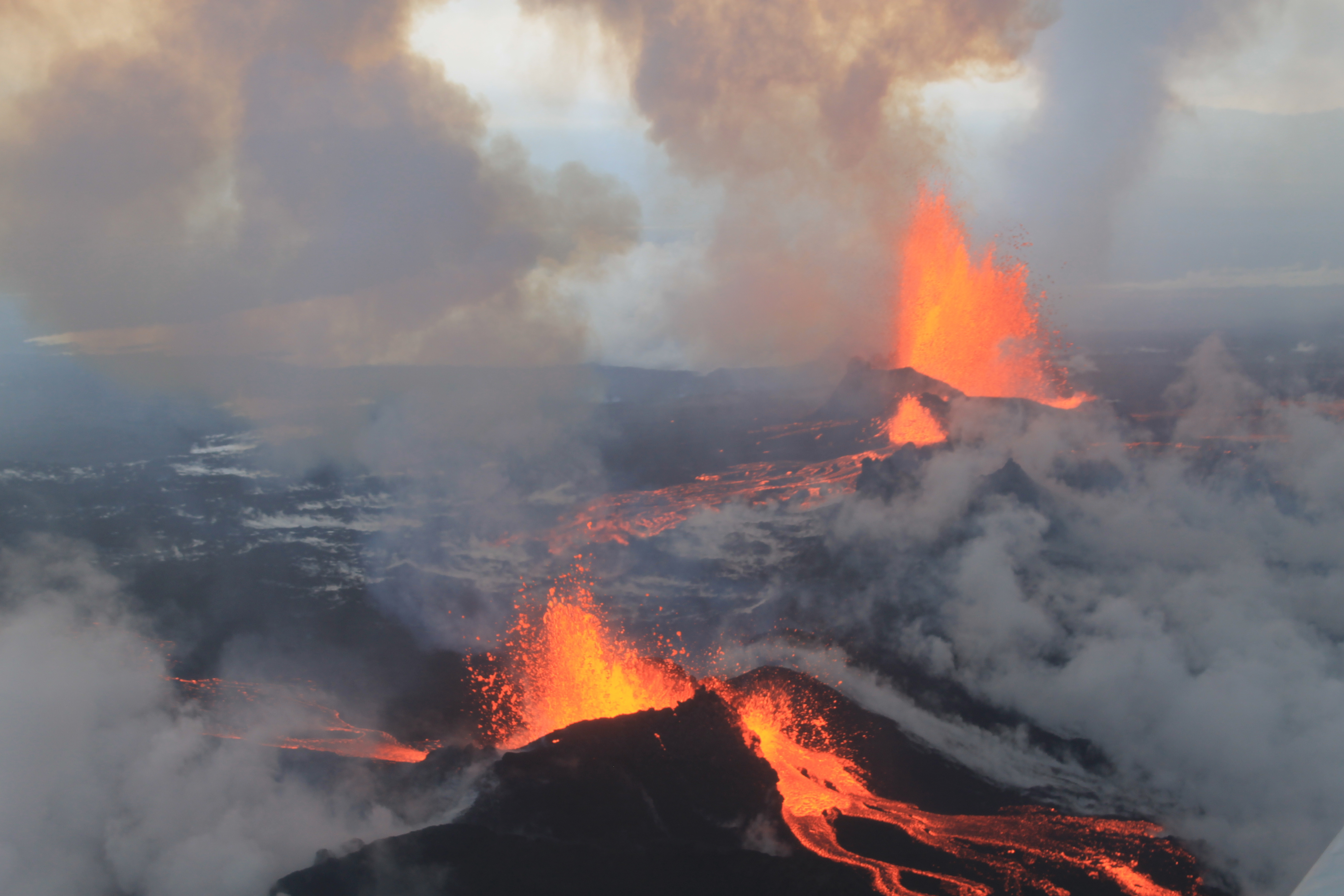
- Eruption at Holuhraun, 4 September 2014

Highest point
- Elevation: 2,000 m (6,600 ft) (Note: This article previously had a height of 2009 m which was a historical figure prior to the 2014 events. As of March 2024 this source and others have been corrected to about 2000 m.)
- Prominence: 550 m (1,800 ft)
- Coordinates: 64°38′28″N 17°31′41″W

Geography
- Location within Iceland
- Geological features near the Bárðarbunga volcanic system (red outlines -note potential overlap with other volcanic systems is only shown in south (Note: The overlap with other volcanic systems, recognised to south and to north after 2015 is not shown to north as good maps illustrating the area of overlap to north were not identified.)). Light violet shows Bárðarbunga associated recent lava fields. Legend: Other shading shows: calderas; central volcanoes; fissure swarms; subglacial terrain above 1,100 m (3,600 ft); seismically active areas; Clicking on the rectangle in the image enlarges to full window and enables mouse-over with more detail. Map of Iceland showing the location of Bárðarbunga.
- Location: Vatnajökull, Iceland

Geology
- Rock age: over 10,000 years
- Mountain type: Subglacial volcano/Icelandic stratovolcano
- Last eruption: 29 August 2014 to 27 February 2015

Bárðarbunga (Icelandic pronunciation: [ˈpaurðarˌpuŋka], alternative name Veiðivötn), is an active and productive stratovolcano located under Vatnajökull, which is Iceland's most extensive glacier, in Vatnajökull National Park. The second highest mountain in Iceland, 2,000 metres (6,600 ft) above sea level, Bárðarbunga is also part of the Bárðarbunga-Veiðivötn volcanic system that is approximately 190 kilometres (120 mi) long and 25 kilometres (16 mi) wide.

Bárðarbunga erupted in late August 2014. The eruption style was effusive, which is common in Iceland, but had not been seen for a few years. Lava covered the surrounding landscape northwest of the Vatnajökull glacier.

== Description ==
Bárðarbunga is a subglacial stratovolcano and central volcano under the ice cap of Vatnajökull glacier in the Vatnajökull National Park in Iceland. It is one of the six volcanic systems under Vatnajökull. The central volcano has a rim that rises to about 2,000 m (6,600 ft) above sea level, making it the second highest mountain in Iceland, being lower than Hvannadalshnjúkur. The caldera is about 65 km^{2} (25 sq mi), up to 10 km (6.2 mi) wide and about 700 m (2,300 ft) deep. The surrounding edges rise to 1,850 m (6,070 ft), but the base is on average close to 1,100 m (3,600 ft). The volcano is covered in ice to a depth of 850 m (2,790 ft), hiding the glacier-filled crater. The associated volcanic system and fissure swarm is about 190 km (120 mi) long and 25 km (16 mi) wide.

Bárðarbunga was a little-known volcano in Iceland due to its remote location and infrequent eruptions approximately once every 50 years, but recent studies have shown that many tephra layers originally thought to be from other volcanoes were ejected from Bárðarbunga, and that lateral dyke intrusions may trigger eruptions in adjacent volcanoes. (Note: Lateral dyke propagation from a magma reservoir, resulting in eruptions more than 40 km (25 mi) away from the reservoir or sometimes triggering the magma chamber associated with another volcano to erupt, while being increasingly described or postulated to have happened in geological circles, are not well described in the historic volcanology literature. This is as the technology to convincingly detect them (e.g. real-time area height mapping, local real-time seismology arrays, and micro–compositional analysis) did not exist until recently. Historic eruptions possibly involving such lateral dyke propagation can be suspected on retrospective compositional analysis, say of tephra layers from one eruption sequence.)

Sustained seismic activity had been gradually increasing in Bárðarbunga and its associated northern fissure system for seven years starting in 2007 and leading to an eruption towards the end of 2014. This activity had decreased after the Grímsvötn eruption in 2011, but later returned to a similar level as before the eruption. The previous Bárðarbunga eruption was in 1910. There has been frequent volcanic activity outside the glacier to the south-west in the highlands between Vatnajökull and Mýrdalsjökull, and also to the north-east toward Dyngjufjöll [ˈtɪɲcʏˌfjœtl̥].

The Bárðarbunga volcanic system is associated with a second central volcano Hamarinn which has been classified historically as part of a separate Loki-Fögrufjöll volcanic system. Hamarinn is 20 km (12 mi) to the south-west of the Bárðarbunga central volcano.

=== Context ===
While the central volcanoes of the Bárðarbunga volcanic system are under the western edge of the Vatnajökull ice cap, the system's northern fissure swarm and lava flows extend around the southern flanks of the Askja volcano and the southern fissure swarm extends past the north-west of Torfajökull and almost reaches Tindfjallajökull. The southern lava flows have reached the sea near Selfoss. It is now known that within the area of the rhyolitic caldera of Torfajökull there are younger extrusives that involve basaltic magma mixing events by lateral propagation, from the fissure swarm of Bárðarbunga's volcanic system. To the west of the central volcanoes is the less active volcanic system of Tungnafellsjökull and to the central volcanoes south west, also under Vatnajökull is the very active Grímsvötn volcanic system. In the 1996 eruption of Gjálp which is usually assigned to the Grímsvötn volcanic system, studies are consistent with the eruption being triggered by a 10 km (6.2 mi) lateral dyke intrusion at about 5 km (3.1 mi) depth from Bárðarbunga, although this is not proven.

== Etymology ==
Bárðarbunga is named after an early Icelandic settler named Gnúpa-Bárður [ˈknuːpa-ˌpaurðʏr̥], and literally translates as "Bárður's bulge" or "Bárður's bump" since "Bárðar" is the genitive case of "Bárður".

== Eruptions and notable activity ==
Throughout history, there have been large eruptions every 250–600 years. In 1477, the largest known eruption from Bárðarbunga had a volcanic explosivity index (VEI) of 6; there is evidence of many smaller eruptions during the past 10,000 years.

=== 6600 BC ===
Þjórsá Lava, the largest Holocene lava flow on earth, originated from Bárðarbunga about 8,600 years ago, with a total volume of 21 to 30 cubic kilometres and covering approximately 950 square kilometres.

=== 877 ===
Many large eruptions have occurred south-west of the glacier; the first occurring since human settlement of Iceland was the Vatnaöldur eruption, about 877 ± 2 CE, which had a volcanic explosivity index (VEI) of 4. It is associated with apparently simultaneous eruptions at Hrafntinnuhraun and Skyggnishlíðarvötn in the neighbouring Torfajökull volcanic complex to the SW.

=== 1477 ===
The Veiðivötn eruption in 1477 is the largest known Icelandic eruption, with a VEI of 6.

=== 1701–1864 ===
Studies of tephra layers have shown that a number of eruptions have occurred beneath the glacier, probably in the northeast of the crater or in Bárðarbunga. There have also been smaller eruptions in an ice-free area of Dyngjuháls [ˈtiɲcʏˌhauls] to the north-east. Eruptions appear to follow a cycle: there were several eruptions in the glacier between 1701 and 1740 and since 1780.

=== 1910 eruption ===
1910 was the last known significant eruption of the Bárðarbunga volcanic system before the 2014 eruptions. It occurred in the Loki-Fögrufjöll volcano.

=== 1996 ===
The Gjálp fissure vent eruption in 1996 revealed that an interaction may exist between Bárðarbunga and Grímsvötn. A strong earthquake in Bárðarbunga, about 5 on the Richter scale, is believed to have started the eruption in Gjálp. On the other hand, because the magma erupted showed strong connections to the Grímsvötn Volcanic System as petrology studies showed, the 1996, as well as a former eruption in the 1930s, are thought to have taken place within Grímsvötn Volcanic system.

=== 2010 ===
On 26 September 2010, an earthquake swarm was recorded with over 30 earthquakes measuring up to 3.7M_{W} on the moment magnitude scale.

=== 2014–2015 ===
In August 2014, a swarm of around 1,600 earthquakes in 48-hours, with magnitudes up to 4.5M_{W}, was followed on 23 August by the USGS Aviation Color Codes being raised from orange to red, indicating an eruption in progress. The following day, the aviation risk was lowered from red to orange and the statement that there was an eruption in progress was retracted. However, later aerial observations of glacial depressions southeast of the volcano suggested that the now-retracted report of an eruption had been correct and that a short eruption did occur under the ice, but the lack of further melting indicated that this eruption had now ceased. Then, a new fissure eruption breached the surface between Bárðarbunga and Askja, in the Holuhraun lava field, in the early hours of 29 August. This was followed by a second fissure eruption in the Holuhraun area, along the same volcanic fissure, which started shortly after 4 am on 31 August.

The eruption emitted large volumes of sulphur dioxide and impacted air quality in Iceland. There was no effect on flights outside of the immediate vicinity as the eruption hadn't produced a significant amount of volcanic ash.

On 28 February 2015, it was officially reported that the eruption was over. Nevertheless, the gas pollution still existed, and the area north of Bárðarbunga, including volcanoes Askja and Herðubreið, still remained closed for visitors.

On 16 March 2015, the area north of Bárðarbunga was opened for visitors, excluding the new lava field and the area within 20 metres around it.

=== 2024 ===
On 21 April 2024 a M_{w} 5.3 earthquake occurred in the Bárðarbunga volcanic system. This was the largest earthquake under this region of the Vatnajökull icecap since the 2015 eruption and was associated with isolated smaller fore- and aftershocks but no other markers of potential volcanic activity.

Eruptions Bárðarbunga volcanic system last 10,000 years (unconfirmed eruptions not shown) (Note: Timings published before 2017 for eruptions between around 700 to 900 are likely inaccurate, and sources for all corrected timings in Gudmundsdóttir et al 2016 in this period have not been identified in public domain. Literature timings were adjusted after the Icelandic tree ring series was extended to 822. Also the potential for dating errors increase with time. Where uncertainty in separate tephra studies might exist that an assigned dates are not a separate eruption, this is noted in table comments. Towards the end of the 10,000 year time series some analysis have errors of order of a 1000 years. As a result there might be more assignable definite eruptions than implied. The last eruption shown may or may not be within 10,000 years of current present given these inaccuracies.)
Standard Date	Date Cal BP	Lava volume	VEI	Comment
2015	-	>1.2 km^{3} (0.29 cu mi)	0	Central Volcano
1910	40	-	2	Central Volcano
1902	48	-	2	Central Volcano
1872	78	-	-	
1862	88	>0.3 km^{3} (0.072 cu mi)	2	Fissure swarm
1797	153	-	-	Fissure swarm
1794	156	-	-	
1769	181	-	2	
1766	184	-	2	
1750	200	-	-	
1739	211	-	2	
1729	221	-	1	
1726	224	-	1	
1720	230	-	2	
1717	233	-	3	
1716	234	-	2	
1712	238	-	2	
1707	243	-	2	
1706	244	-	2	
1702	248	-	2	
1697	253	-	2	
1477	473	>0.35 km^{3} (0.084 cu mi)	6	Fissure swarm Previous dating was 470 BP
1410	540	-	-	
1350±10	600±10	-	-	
1290±10	660±10	-	-	
1270±10	680±10	-	-	
1250±50	700±50	-	1	
1159	791	-	-	Also dated to 1072 CE.
1080	870	-	-	
940	1010	-	-	Also dated to 928 CE.
877	1073	0.17 km^{3} (0.041 cu mi)	4	Re-calibrated BP ice core gives 877 ± 2. The uncalibrated BP age was 871 and the ice core dating of the settlement layer was previously 1079 ± 2 BP
808	1142	-	-	
753	1197	-	-	
654	1296	-	-	
473	1477	-	-	
451	1499	-	-	
445	1505	-	-	
150	1800	-	2	Possibly dated to one of the tephra eruptions dated to 180 and 128 CE
1 BCE	1951	-	-	
18 BCE	1968	-	-	This was a combined tephra eruption with Grímsvötn
178 BCE	2128	-	-	This was a combined tephra eruption with Kverkfjöll
278 BCE	2228	-	-	
288 BCE	2238	-	-	
583 BCE	2533	-	-	
661 BCE	2611	-	-	
860 BCE	2810	-	-	
991 BCE	2941	-	-	
1200 BCE	3150	-	-	There are assigned tephra tayers dated to 3056 and 3361 BP which may not be both separate eruptions
1981 BCE	3931	-	-	
2424 BCE	4374	-	-	
3559 BCE	5509	-	-	Fissure swarm
3738 BCE	5688	-	-	Fissure swarm
3745 BCE	5695	-	-	This was a combined tephra eruption with Grímsvötn
3858 BCE	5808	-	-	Fissure swarm
3907 BCE	5857	-	-	Fissure swarm
3981 BCE	5931	-	-	Fissure swarm
4062 BCE	6012	-	-	Fissure swarm
4087 BCE	6037	-	-	Fissure swarm
4200 BCE	6150	-	-	A tephra layer dated to 6102 BP exists which may not be a separate eruption
4400 BCE	6350	-	-	
4550 BCE	6500	-	-	A tephra layer dated to 6508 BP exists which may not be a separate eruption
4600 BCE	6550	-	-	
4800 BCE	6750	-	-	A tephra layer dated to 6799 BP also exists mixed with tephra with Grímsvötn characteristics which may not be a separate eruption
5000 BCE	6950	-	-	A tephra layer dated to 7108 BP exists which may not be a separate eruption
5788 BCE	7738	-	-	This was a combined tephra eruption with an unknown volcano
5893 BCE	7843	-	-	Fissure swarm
6120 BCE	8070	-	-	Fissure swarm
6650±50 BCE	8600±50	-	-	A tephra layer dated to 8367 BP exists which may not be a separate eruption
7050±1000 BCE	9000±1000	-	-	A tephra layer dated to 9267 BP exists which may not be a separate eruption
7100±1000 BCE	9050±1000	-	-	Tephra layers dated to 9344 BP in a combined eruption with Grímsvötn and 9376 BP in a fissure swarm eruption exist one of which may not be a separate eruption
7662 BCE	9612	-	-	
7867 BCE	9817	-	-	
8040 BCE	9990	-	-	Fissure swarm

== 1950 Geysir air crash ==
On 14 September 1950 a Douglas C-54 Skymaster aircraft belonging to the Icelandic airline Loftleiðir crash landed on the Vatnajökull glacier at Bárðarbunga during a cargo flight from Luxembourg to Reykjavík. There were no fatalities, but damaged radio equipment left them unable to communicate their location. After two days the crew managed to reach the emergency transmitter in the plane's rubber liferaft and send out a distress call which was picked up by the Icelandic Coast Guard vessel Ægir. The same day a search and rescue Catalina aircraft, named Vestfirðingur, spotted them. The C-54's cargo included the body of a deceased United States Air Force (USAF) colonel, prompting American assistance. A USAF C-47 equipped with skis landed on the glacier but was unable to take off again, so it had to be abandoned. After six days both crews were rescued by a ski-patrol from Akureyri. Later Loftleiðir bought the stranded C-47 from the USAF for $700. In April 1951 it was dug out of the snow and towed down the mountain by two bulldozers, where it was started and flown to Reykjavík.

== See also ==
- Timeline of volcanism on Earth
- Volcanism of Iceland
  - List of volcanic eruptions in Iceland
  - List of volcanoes in Iceland
