= Dyngjujökull =

Glacier in Iceland

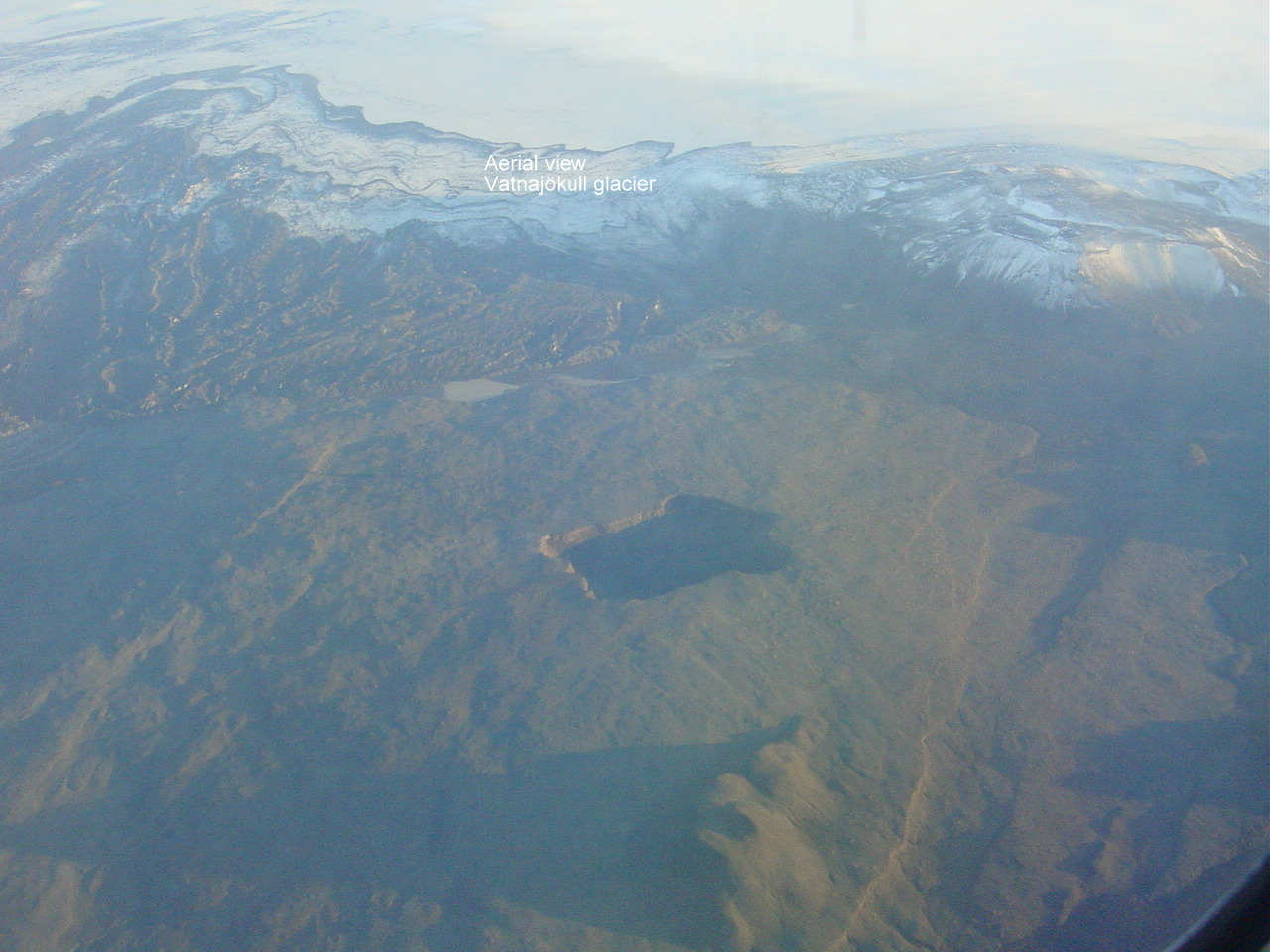
- Kárahnjúkar Hydroelectric Project. Installed capacity 690 MW

- Location within Iceland
- Type: Outlet glacier
- Location: Suður-Þingeyjarsýsla, Northeastern Region, Iceland
- Coordinates: 64.72°N 17.01°W
- Terminus: Jökulsá á Fjöllum

Dyngjujökull (Icelandic pronunciation: [ˈtiɲcʏˌjœːkʏtl̥], shield volcano glacier) is an outlet glacier of the Vatnajökull glacier in Vatnajökull National Park, Iceland. The glacier is in the Icelandic Highlands and is situated between Bárðarbunga, Holuhraun and Kverkfjöll. Meltwater from the glacier flows into Jökulsá á Fjöllum, the second longest river in Iceland.

Depressions discovered by scientists, on 6 September 2014, have prompted speculation that eruptions may be occurring below the surface of the glacier. This is associated with seismic activity at the Bárðarbunga caldera, a large volcanic structure located beneath the glacier.
