= Grímsvötn =

Volcano in Iceland

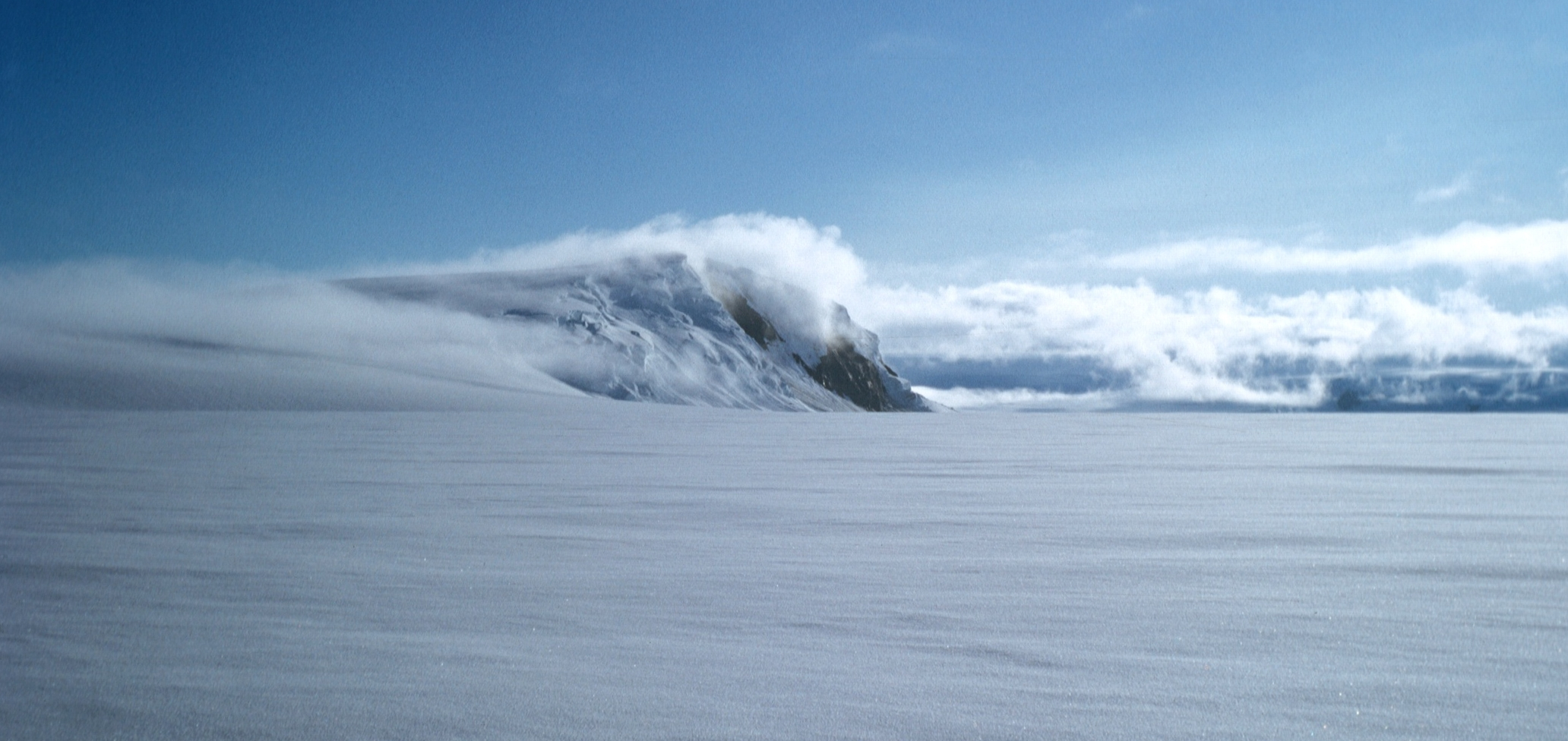
- Grímsvötn and the Vatnajökull glacier, Iceland, July 1972

Highest point
- Elevation: 1,725 m (5,659 ft)
- Listing: List of volcanoes in Iceland
- Coordinates: 64°25′12″N 17°19′48″W

Geography
- Location within Iceland
- Geological features near the Grímsvötn central volcano and its fissure swarm (red outlines). The fissure swarm's recent surface lava flows are shaded violet (darker if more recent, vents violet outline). Legend: Other shading shows: calderas; central volcanoes; fissure swarms; subglacial terrain above 1,100 m (3,600 ft); seismically active areas; Clicking on the rectangle in the image enlarges to full window and enables mouse-over with more detail.
- Location: Austur-Skaftafellssýsla / Vestur-Skaftafellssýsla, Iceland

Geology
- Mountain type: Volcanic caldera
- Last eruption: May 2011

Grímsvötn (Icelandic pronunciation: [ˈkrimsˌvœhtn̥]; vötn = "waters", singular: vatn) is an active volcano with a (partially subglacial) fissure system located in Vatnajökull National Park, Iceland. The central volcano is completely subglacial and located under the northwestern side of the Vatnajökull ice cap. The subglacial caldera is at 64°25′N 17°20′W, at an elevation of 1,725 m (5,659 ft). Beneath the caldera is the magma chamber of the Grímsvötn volcano.

Grímsvötn is a basaltic volcano which has the highest eruption frequency of all the volcanoes in Iceland. It has a southwest-northeast-trending fissure system. The massive climate-impacting Laki fissure eruption of 1783–1784 took place in a part of the same Grímsvötn-Laki volcanic system. Grímsvötn was erupting at the same time as Laki during 1783, but continued to erupt until 1785. Because most of the volcanic system lies underneath Vatnajökull, most of its eruptions have been subglacial and the interaction of magma and meltwater from the ice causes phreatomagmatic explosive activity. Within the Grímsvötn-Laki volcanic system is a second central volcano called Thordarhyrna (Þórðarhyrna).

== Jökulhlaup ==
Eruptions in the caldera regularly cause glacial outbursts known as jökulhlaup. Eruptions or geothermal activity, melt enough ice to fill the Grímsvötn caldera with water, and the pressure may be enough to suddenly lift the ice cap, allowing huge quantities of water to escape rapidly. Earthquakes and seismic tremor may occur. Jökulhlaup can occur independent of eruptions or be followed by eruptions. Jökulhlaup independent of eruptions occurred in November, December 2021 and October 2022. Jökulhlaup which were followed by eruptions occurred in 1922, 1934 and 2004. Consequently, the Grímsvötn caldera is monitored very carefully.

When a large eruption occurred in 1996, geologists knew well in advance that a glacial burst was imminent. It did not occur until several weeks after the eruption finished, but monitoring ensured that the Icelandic ring road (Hringvegur) was closed when the burst occurred. A section of road across the Skeiðará sandur was washed away in the ensuing flood, but no one was hurt.

== Eruption history between 1990 and today ==
=== Gjálp 1996 ===
The Gjálp fissure vent eruption in 1996 revealed that an interaction may exist between Bárðarbunga and Grímsvötn. A strong earthquake at Bárðarbunga, about magnitude 5, is believed to have been related to the triggering of the eruption in Gjálp. On the other hand, because the magma erupted showed strong connections to the Grímsvötn Volcanic System according to petrology studies, the 1996 as well as a former eruption at Gjálp in the 1930s are thought to have taken place within Grímsvötn Volcanic system.

=== 1998 and 2004 eruptions ===
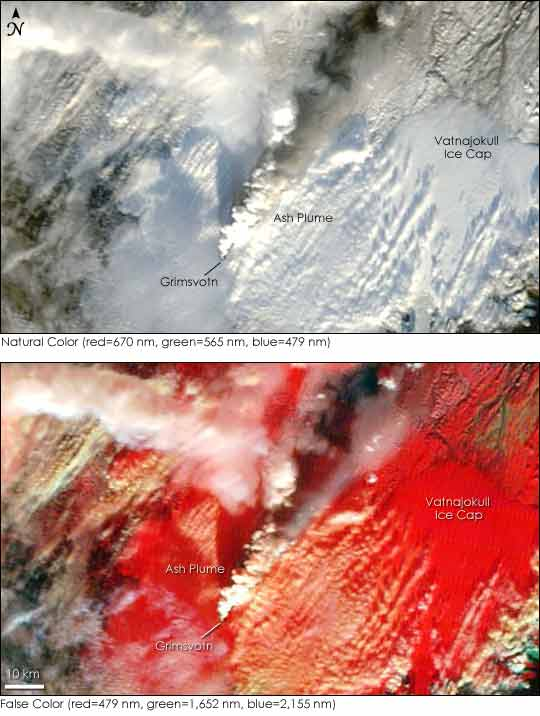
Satellite images of the November 2004 Grímsvötn Eruption. The lower image assigns a false color (red) to the surface ice.

A week-long eruption occurred at Grímsvötn starting on 28 December 1998, but no glacial burst occurred. In November 2004, a week-long eruption occurred. Volcanic ash from the eruption fell as far away as mainland Europe and caused short-term disruption of airline traffic into Iceland, but again no glacial burst followed the eruption.

=== 2011 eruption ===
Harmonic tremors were recorded twice around Grímsvötn on 2 and 3 October 2010, possibly indicating an impending eruption. At the same time, sudden inflation was measured by GPS in the volcano, indicating magma movement under the caldera. On 1 November 2010 meltwater from the Vatnajökull glacier was flowing into a lake, suggesting that an eruption of the underlying volcano could be imminent.

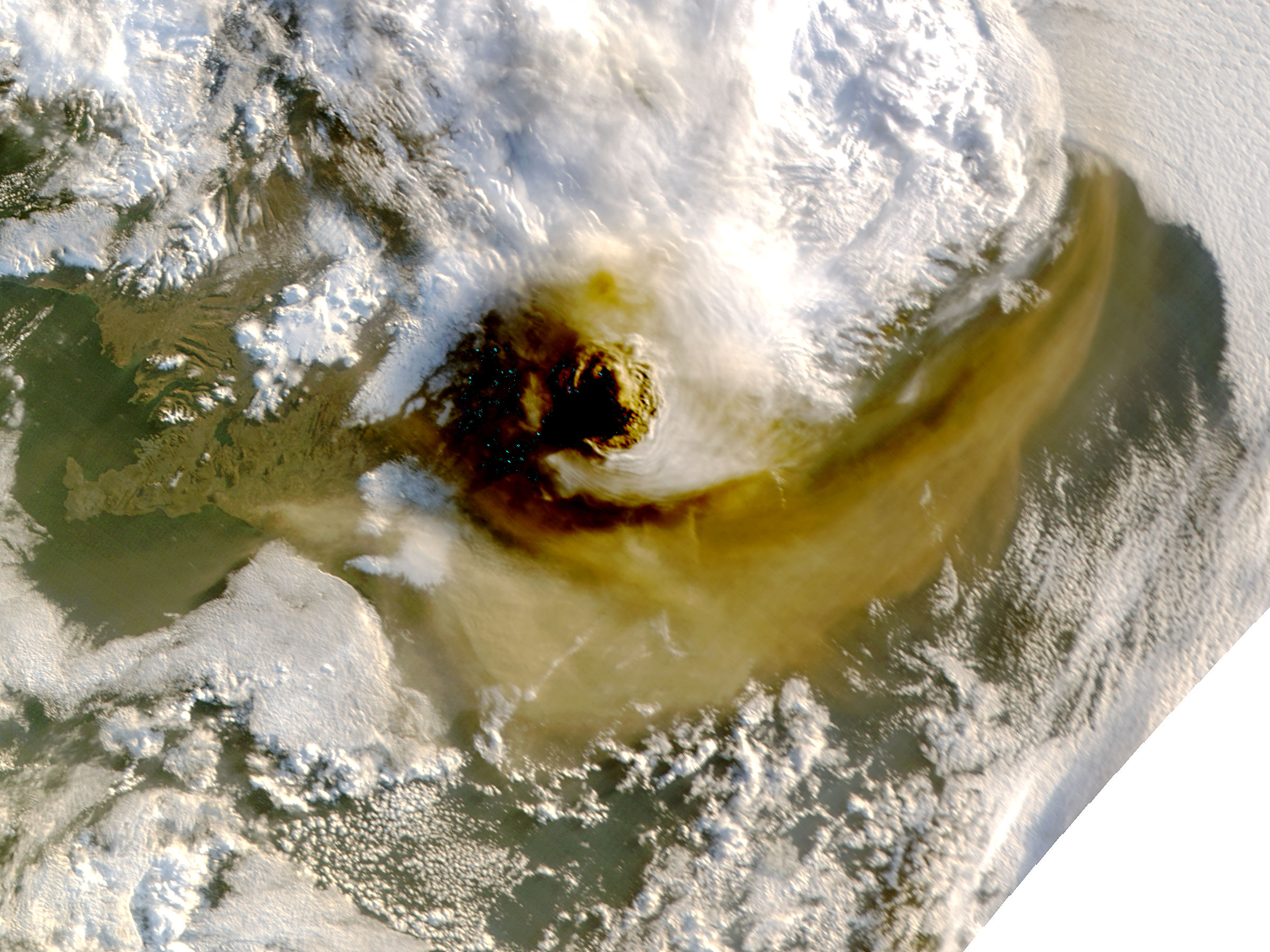
Satellite image from 22 May 2011 of the volcanic plume above Iceland

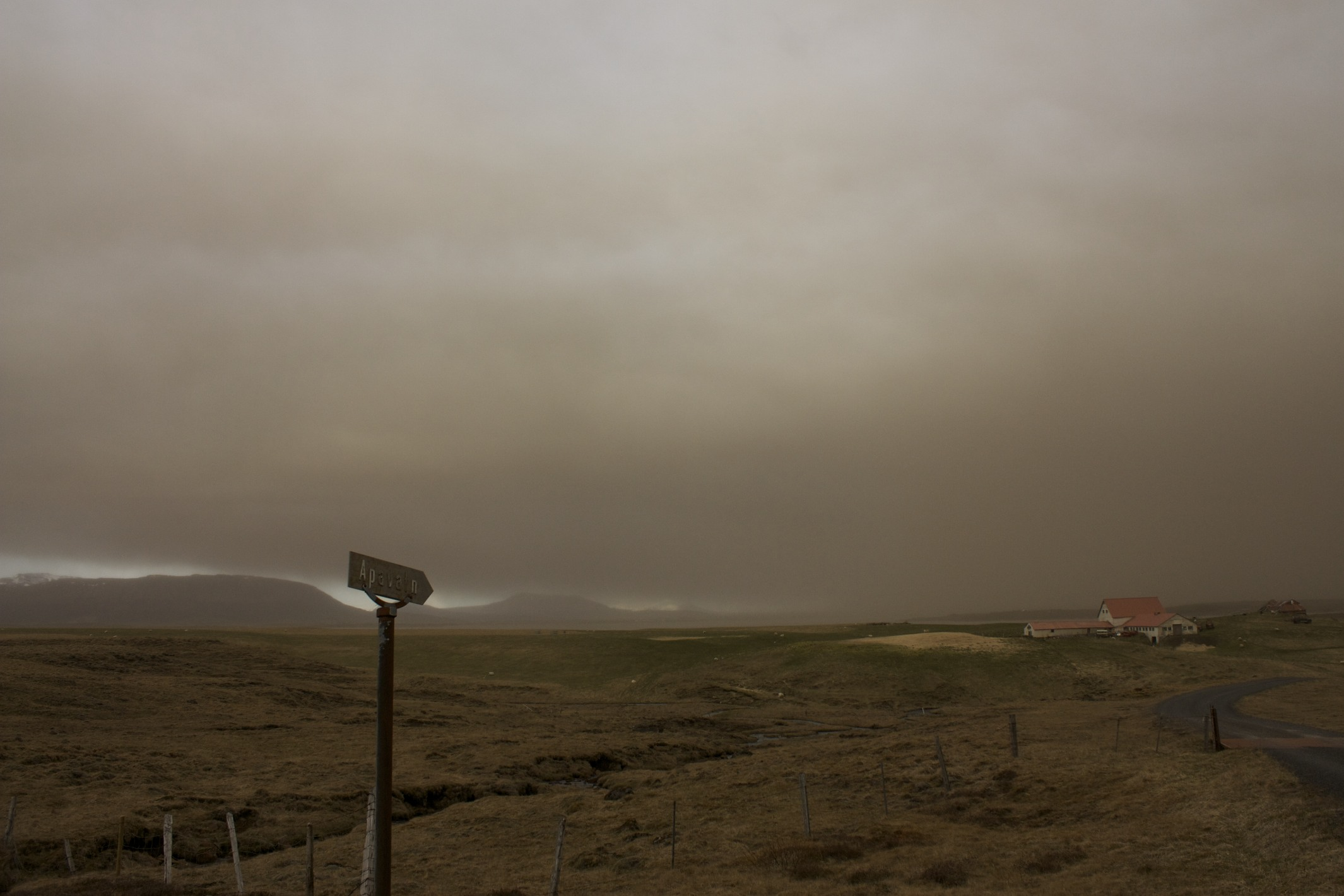
View of Icelandic landscape beneath the ash-cloud during the 2011 eruption

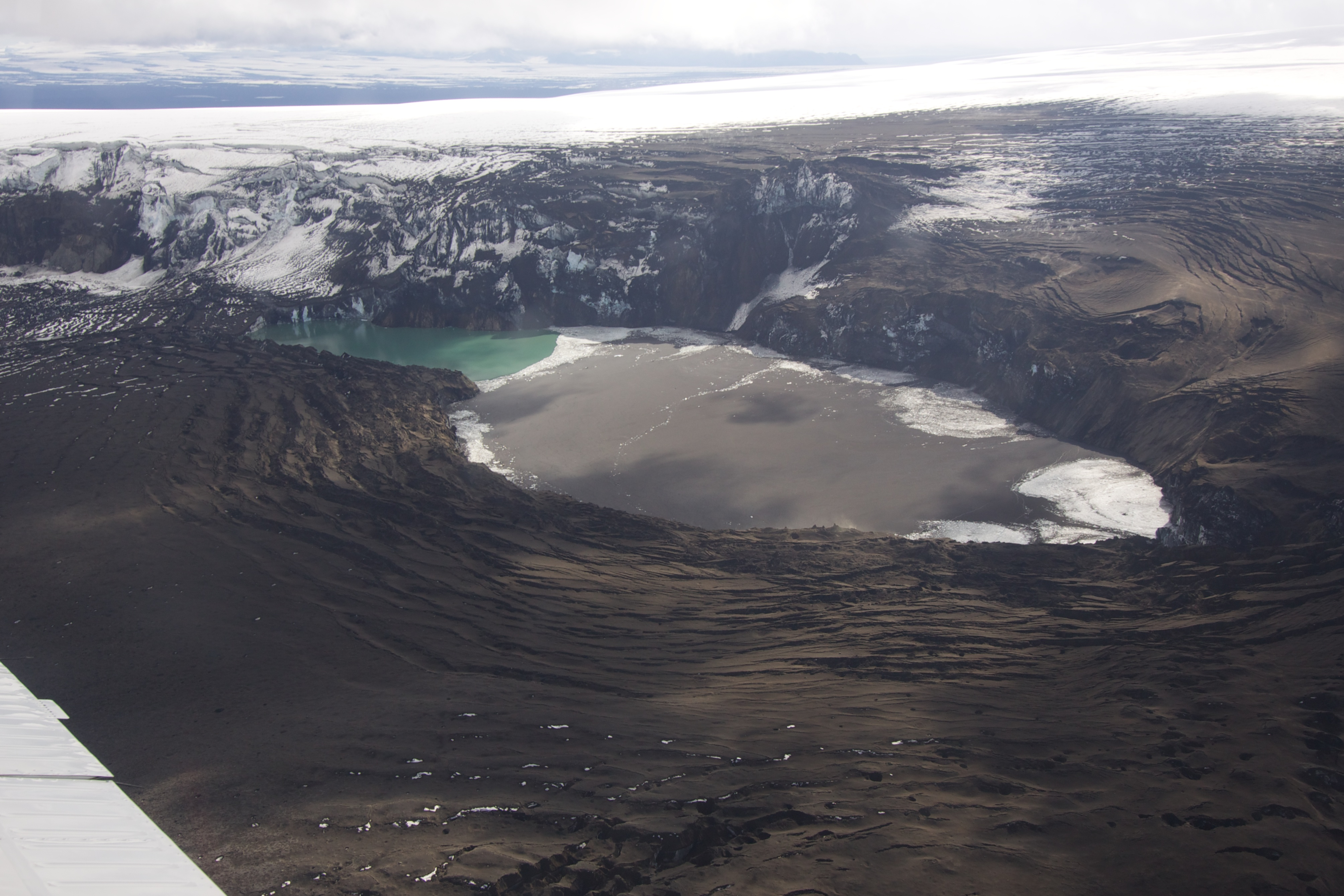
Grímsvötn in August 2011. Ash covering the surrounding snow and ice

On 21 May 2011 at 19:25 UTC, an eruption began, with 12 km (7 mi) high plumes accompanied by multiple earthquakes, Until 25 May, the eruption scale had been larger than that of the 2010 eruption of Eyjafjallajökull.

The ash cloud from the eruption rose to 20 km (12 mi), and was so far 10 times larger than the 2004 eruption, and the strongest in Grímsvötn in the last 100 years.

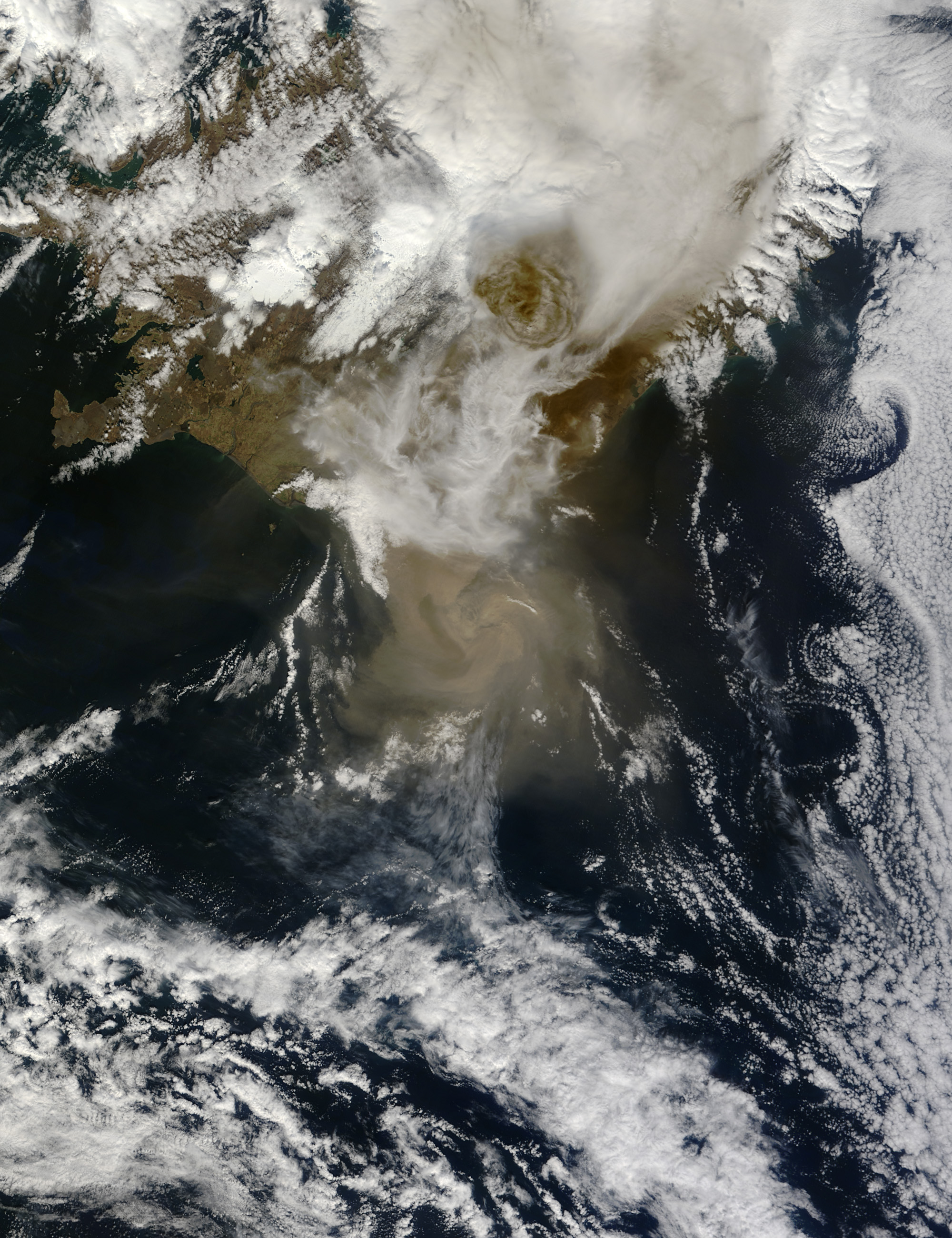
Satellite image from 23 May 2011 of the ash-cloud to the south of Iceland

Disruption to air travel in Iceland commenced on 22 May, followed by Greenland, Scotland, Norway, Svalbard and a small part of Denmark on subsequent days. On 24 May the disruption spread to Northern Ireland and to airports in northern England. The cancellation of 900 out of 90,000 European flights in the period 23–25 May was much less widespread than the 2010 disruption after the Eyjafjallajökull eruption.

The eruption stopped at 02:40 UTC on 25 May 2011, although there was some explosive activity from the eruptive vents affecting only the area around the crater.

=== 2020 onward threats of eruption ===
In June 2020, the Icelandic Meteorological Office (IMO) issued a warning that an eruption might take place in the coming weeks or months, following scientists reporting high levels of sulfur dioxide, which is indicative of the presence of shallow magma. IMO warned that a glacial flood as a result of melting ice could trigger an eruption. No eruption occurred.

In September 2021, an increase in water outflow from under the Vatnajökull ice cap was reported. The water contains elevated levels of dissolved hydrogen sulfide, suggesting increased volcanic activity under the ice. Jökulhlaup (glacial lake flooding) can occur before or after an eruption.

On 4 December 2021, a jökulhlaup occurred from Grímsvötn into the Gígjukvísl river, with an average flow of 2,600 m^{3}/s (92,000 cu ft/s). Two days later, the Icelandic Meteorological Office increased the alert level for Grímsvötn from yellow to orange, after a series of earthquakes was detected. On 7 December, the alert level was lowered back to yellow, after seismic activity decreased and no signs of eruptive activity were detected.

On 11 December 2023, a jökulhlaup followed in time, a M_{w} 4.5 earthquake.

== Eruption history before 1990 ==
Tephra studies on soil samples from around the Vatnajökull ice-cap, show that the Grímsvötn volcanic system has high activity for Iceland, and had between 4 to 14 explosive eruptions every 100 years (mean about 7 eruptions every 100 years) between 7600 years ago and 870 AD. For technical reasons only the last 10,200 years of explosive eruptions have been characterised locally, and the record gets more inaccurate with time especially prior to 1598, which is first eruption timed to the day. The Laki eruptions which were both effusive and explosive between June 1783 and February 1784, produced the Skaftáreldahraun lava flows, which cover a large part of south-east Iceland. Before this the tip of the Rauðhólar-Eldgígur fissure system was active with the production of the 4550 BCE Botnahraun lava flow which extends beyond the furtherest extent to the south of the Laki lava field. The Rauðhólar-Eldgígur fissure system also formed the Núpahraun lava flows around 4000 BP that extend from the Vatnajökull glacier towards the south east coast and are covered in part by the northern Laki Skaftáreldahraun lava flow. There are two recent pre-historic but undated Bergvatnsárhraun lava flows just on the south-eastern edge of the Vatnajökull glacier, related to the line of the Rauðhólar-Eldgígur fissures.

Eruptions Grímsvötn volcanic system last 10,000 years (unconfirmed eruptions not shown)
Standard Date	Date Cal BP	Lake Lögurinn tephra thickness	VEI	Comment
2011	-	-	4	
2004	-	-	3	
1998	-	-	3	
1996	-	-	3	
1983	-	-	2	
1954	-	-	1	
1938	12	-	4	
1934	16	-	2	
1933	17	-	1	
1922	28	9 cm (3.5 in)	2	,Lake Lögurinn core.
1919	31	-	2	
1910	40	-	-	
1897	53	-	2	
1891	-41	-	2	
1883	67	-	2	
1873	77	-	4	
1867	83	-	1	
1854	96	-	2	
1838	112	-	2	
1816	134	-	2	
1783	167	-	4	Laki eruption.
1774	176	-	2	
1768	182	-	2	
1753	197	-	2	
1730	220	-	2	
1725	225	-	2	
1716	234	-	2	
1706	244	-	2	
1697	253	-	-	
1684	266	-	2	
1681	269	-	-	
1665	285	7 cm (2.8 in)	-	Approx 280 BP eruption Lake Lögurinn core.
1659	291	-	2	
1638	312	-	2	
1632	318	-	-	
1629	321	-	2	
1622	328	-	-	
1619	331	-	2	
1610	340	-	-	
1603	347	2 cm (0.79 in)	-	Approx 345 BP eruption - Oct 1603 Lake Lögurinn core
1598	352	-	3	
1530±10	420±10	-	-	
1521	429	-	-	
1510	440	-	-	Lake Lögurinn core.
1508	442	8 cm (3.1 in)	-	Lake Lögurinn core.
1500	450	-	-	Lake Lögurinn core.
1500	450	-	-	
1490±10	460±10	-	-	
1471	479	-	-	
1470±10	480±10	-	-	
1469	481	-	-	
1450±10	500±10	-	-	
1430±10	520±10	-	-	
1390±10	560±10	-	-	
1370±10	580±10	-	-	
1369	581	-	-	
1354	596	-	-	Lake Lögurinn, Kárahnjúkar & Snæfell cores.
1350	600	-	-	
1341	609	-	2	
1332	618	-	2	
1310±10	640±10	-	-	
1290±10	660±10	-	-	
1270±10	680±10	-	-	
1230±10	720±10	-	-	
1190	760	-	-	
1162	788	5 cm (2.0 in)	-	Lake Lögurinn, Kárahnjúkar & Snæfell cores.
1090	860	-	-	
1050	900	5 cm (2.0 in)	-	Lake Lögurinn, Kárahnjúkar & Snæfell cores.
1010	940	-	-	
977	973	5 cm (2.0 in)	-	Lake Lögurinn core. Has some Veidivötn-Bárdarbunga compositional characteristics - may be mixed eruption or mis–assigned.
885	1065	-	-	Lake Lögurinn, Kárahnjúkar & Snæfell cores. (Note: Timings published before 2017 for eruptions between around 700 to 900 are likely inaccurate but need a source to update. Accordingly where the tephra layer is in publications based on Greenland ice core studies since then, dates have been adjusted. Unadjusted timings based on Gudmundsdóttir et al 2016 could be inaccurate.Literature timings were adjusted after the Icelandic tree ring series was extended to 822.)
858	1092	9 cm (3.5 in)	-	Lake Lögurinn & Kárahnjúkar cores.
853	1097	3 cm (1.2 in)	-	Lake Lögurinn & Kárahnjúkar cores.
852	1098	5 cm (2.0 in)	-	Lake Lögurinn, Kárahnjúkar & Snæfell cores.
850	1100	2 cm (0.79 in)	-	Lake Lögurinn core. Has also Kverkfjöll, Veidivötn-Bárdarbunga compositional characteristics - may be mixed eruption or mis–assigned.
781	1169	2 cm (0.79 in)	-	Greenland, Lake Lögurinn, Kárahnjúkar & Snæfell cores.
753	1197	-	-	Greenland core
502	1448	9 cm (3.5 in)	-	Lake Lögurinn, Kárahnjúkar cores.
303	1647	5 cm (2.0 in)	-	Lake Lögurinn core.
280	1670	4 cm (1.6 in)	-	Lake Lögurinn, Kárahnjúkar, Snæfell, Svartárkort & marine cores.
216	1734	6 cm (2.4 in)	-	Lake Lögurinn, Kárahnjúkar & Snæfell cores.
183	1767	1 cm (0.39 in)	-	Lake Lögurinn core.
18±100 BCE	1968±100	3 cm (1.2 in)	2	Lake Lögurinn core. Has some Veidivötn-Bárdarbunga compositional characteristics - may be mixed eruption or mis–assigned
589 BCE	2539	7 cm (2.8 in)	-	Lake Lögurinn core.
800 BCE	2750	4 cm (1.6 in)	-	Lake Lögurinn, Kárahnjúkar, Snæfell & marine cores.
834 BCE	2784	9 cm (3.5 in)	-	Lake Lögurinn, Kárahnjúkar, Snæfell & marine cores.
1950 BCE	3900	-	2	
2406 BCE	4356	4 cm (1.6 in)	-	Lake Lögurinn & Kárahnjúkar cores.
2701 BCE	4651	1 cm (0.39 in)	-	Lake Lögurinn, Kárahnjúkar & Snæfell cores.
3343 BCE	5293	9 cm (3.5 in)	-	Lake Lögurinn core. Has some Kverkfjöll compositional characteristics - may be mixed eruption or mis–assigned.
3607 BCE	5557	5 cm (2.0 in)	-	Lake Lögurinn core.
3711 BCE	5661	4 cm (1.6 in)	-	Lake Lögurinn & Snæfell cores.
3745 BCE	5695	7 cm (2.8 in)	-	Lake Lögurinn, Kárahnjúkar & Snæfell cores. Has some Veidivötn-Bárdarbunga compositional characteristics - may be mixed eruption or mis–assigned.
4117 BCE	6067	7 cm (2.8 in)	-	Lake Lögurinn, Kárahnjúkar, Snæfell & marine cores.
4187 BCE	6137	1 cm (0.39 in)	-	Lake Lögurinn core. Trace possible in a Kárahnjúkar core.
4276 BCE	6226	7 cm (2.8 in)	-	Lake Lögurinn. Possibly in a Kárahnjúkar core.
4333 BCE	6283	7 cm (2.8 in)	-	Lake Lögurinn core. Possibly in a Kárahnjúkar core.
4338 BCE	6288	2 cm (0.79 in)	-	Lake Lögurinn. Trace possible in a Kárahnjúkar core.
4674 BCE	6624	-	-	Lake Lögurinn & Kárahnjúkar cores.
4738 BCE	6688	8 cm (3.1 in)	-	Lake Lögurinn & Kárahnjúkar cores.
4849 BCE	6799	7 cm (2.8 in)	-	Lake Lögurinn & Kárahnjúkar cores.
5073 BCE	7023	6 cm (2.4 in)	-	Lake Lögurinn, Kárahnjúkar & Svartárkort cores.
5758 BCE	7708	3 cm (1.2 in)	-	Lake Lögurinn & Kárahnjúkar cores.
5830 BCE	7780	-	-	Lake Lögurinn core.
5889 BCE	7839	2 cm (0.79 in)	-	Lake Lögurinn & Kárahnjúkar cores.
5889 BCE	8176	1 cm (0.39 in)	-	Lake Lögurinn core.
6692 BCE	8642	6 cm (2.4 in)	-	Lake Lögurinn core.
6695 BCE	8645	9 cm (3.5 in)	-	Lake Lögurinn core a possibly in Svartárkort core.
6716 BCE	8666	2 cm (0.79 in)	-	Lake Lögurinn core.
6876 BCE	8826	2 cm (0.79 in)	-	Lake Lögurinn core.
7108 BCE	9058	9 cm (3.5 in)	-	Lake Lögurinn core.
7136 BCE	9086	8 cm (3.1 in)	-	Lake Lögurinn core.
7162 BCE	9112	6 cm (2.4 in)	-	Lake Lögurinn core.
7171 BCE	9121	6 cm (2.4 in)	-	Lake Lögurinn & Svartárkort cores.
7180 BCE	9130	5 cm (2.0 in)	-	Lake Lögurinn & Svartárkort cores
7234 BCE	9184	3 cm (1.2 in)	-	Lake Lögurinn core.
7318 BCE	9268	5 cm (2.0 in)	-	Lake Lögurinn core.
7394 BCE	9344	3 cm (1.2 in)	-	Has some Veidivötn-Bárdarbunga compositional characteristics - may be mixed eruption or mis–assigned. Lake Lögurinn & Snæfell cores
7483 BCE	9433	8 cm (3.1 in)	-	Lake Lögurinn core. Possibly in Snæfell core. Tholeiite basalt G9410 tephra in Torfdalsvatn core dated at 9410 ± 340 BP.
7536 BCE	9486	4 cm (1.6 in)	-	Lake Lögurinn core.
7577 BCE	9527	8 cm (3.1 in)	-	Lake Lögurinn core.
7585 BCE	9535	6 cm (2.4 in)	-	Lake Lögurinn core.
7703 BCE	9653	2 cm (0.79 in)	-	Lake Lögurinn core. Tholeiite basalt tephra G9630 in Torfdalsvatn core dated at 9630 ± 350 BP. May be part of G10ka series tephra which covers a 500 year period. (Note: The precise relationships with the G10ka series tephra from Grímsvötn aged between 10.4 to 9.9 ka BP which includes the Faroes Saksunarvatn Ash and appears to have at least 5 and up to 7 deposits is unclear as full correlation across all the potentially relevant tephra records in for example Iceland has not yet been undertaken. It is suspected that more than 20 eruptions of Grímsvötn took place in the G10ka time period. This note accordingly applies to all tephra layers potentially dated to within this age range.)
7826 BCE	9776	2 cm (0.79 in)	-	Lake Lögurinn & Svartárkort cores Tholeiite basalt tephra G9740 in Torfdalsvatn core dated at 9740 ± 320 BP. May be part of G10ka series tephra which covers a 500 year period.
7899 BCE	9849	-	-	Lake Lögurinn & Kirkjugardur cores. Tholeiite basalt tephra G9850 in Torfdalsvatn core dated at 9850 ± 300 BP. May be part of G10ka series tephra which covers a 500 year period.
7919 BCE	9869	1 cm (0.39 in)	-	Lake Lögurinn, Svartárkort & Kirkjugardur cores. May be part of G10ka series tephra which covers a 500 year period.
8053 BCE	10003	6 cm (2.4 in)	-	Lake Lögurinn core. May be part of G10ka series tephra which covers a 500 year period.
8069 BCE	10019	5 cm (2.0 in)	-	Lake Lögurinn, Svartárkort & Kirkjugardur cores. May be part of G10ka series tephra which covers a 500 year period.
8248 BCE	10198	-	-	Lake Lögurinn, Kirkjugardur cores. May be part of G10ka series tephra which covers a 500 year period. Tholeiite basalt tephra in at least one of seven layers in Torfdalsvatn core.
8250 BCE	10200	-	6	Also has some Borrobol tephra like compositional characteristics - may be mixed eruption or mis–assigned. Lake Lögurinn, Svartárkort, Litligardur & Reitsvík cores and may be the Fosen tephra identified of same age in Fosen, Norway Tholeiite basalt tephra in several of seven layers in Torfdalsvatn core. May be part of G10ka series tephra which covers a 500 year period.

== Bacteria in the subglacial lakes ==
In 2004, a community of bacteria was detected in water of the Grímsvötn lake under the glacier, the first time that bacteria have been found in a subglacial lake. The lakes never freeze because of the volcanic heat. The bacteria can also survive at low concentrations of oxygen. The site is a possible analogue for life on the planet Mars, because there are also traces of volcanism and glaciers on Mars and thus the findings could help identify how to look for life on Mars.

== Geology ==
There is the potential for mechanical interaction such as dyke propagation between Grímsvötn and Thordarhyrna. Interactions can also occur with the nearby Bárðarbunga volcano, which is part of a separate volcanic system. The volcano erupts predominantly tholeiitic basalt, and a close chemical affinity exists with the other lavas of the Grímsvötn-Laki volcanic system. The compositional separation from nearby systems has been studied in some detail, and is used to assign lava and tephra deposits to the volcanic system. Some of the tephra's erupted have transpired to have mixed compositions with nearby volcanic systems and it is not known if this is due to dual eruptions or intusions crossing magma reserviors. The volcanic system is part of the Eastern volcanic zone of Iceland, and is directly over the Iceland mantle plume. The volcanic system has crater rows extending to the south east; the 25 km (16 mi) long Laki–Grímsvötn fissure system and the 30 km (19 mi) long Rauðhólar-Eldgígur fissure system. The Rauðhólar-Eldgígur fissure system has been related by some authors to an alignment with the Thordarhyrna central volcano with the Laki–Grímsvötn more in alignment with the Grímsvötn central volcano. Eruptives from Grímsvötn and Thordarhyrna are able to be geochemically distinguished between, so it is possible that the two central volcanoes are not one system. Thordarhyrna has rhyolite formations which have not been found at Grímsvötn.

== Future trends ==
Studies indicate that volcanic activity in Iceland rises and falls so that the frequency and size of eruptions in and around the Vatnajökull ice cap varies with time. It is believed that the four eruptions between 1996 and 2011 could mark the beginning of an active period, during which an eruption in Grímsvötn in Vatnajökull may be expected every 2–7 years. Parallel volcanic activity in nearby Bárðarbunga is known to be associated with increased activity in Grímsvötn. Seismic activity has been increasing in the area in recent years, indicating the entry of magma.

== See also ==
- Geography of Iceland
- Glacial lake outburst flood
- Iceland hotspot
- Iceland plume
- List of glaciers of Iceland
- List of islands of Iceland
- List of lakes of Iceland
- Plate tectonics
- Timeline of volcanism on Earth
- Volcanism of Iceland
  - List of volcanic eruptions in Iceland
  - List of volcanoes in Iceland
