= List of lakes of Iceland =

Iceland has over 20 lakes larger than 10 km^{2} (4 sq mi), and at least 40 others varying between 2.5 and 10 km^{2} (1 to 4 sq mi) in size. This list also includes a few smaller lakes and ponds that are considered notable (for example Tjörnin in Reykjavik). The figures for many of the smaller lakes are unreliable. Also, some larger lakes vary considerably in size between years or seasons or, for the reservoirs, according to the needs of power plants. Some power plant reservoirs may not be present despite being larger than listed lakes.

== Larger lakes (>10 km^{2}) ==
Name	Volume		Area		Depth		Notes
Name	Gigalitres	Billion cu ft	km^{2}	mi^{2}	m	ft	Notes
Þórisvatn	330	12	83–86	32–33	109	358	Hydroelectric reservoir, south central Iceland
Þingvallavatn	286	10.1	84	32	114	374	Named for Þingvellir, site of ancient parliament
Hálslón	210	7.4	57	22	180	590	Reservoir for the Kárahnjúkar Hydropower Plant. The maximum depth of 180 m is reached in late summer when the reservoir fills up and excess water starts to flow over through the spillway. In winter, the surface elevation, and thus the maximum depth, of the lake drops by approximately 45 m. In a very dry year a further drop of 20 m is expected, meaning that the depth of the lake at its deepest point can vary between 115 m and 180 m.
Blöndulón	50	1.8	57	22	39	128	Hydroelectric reservoir, N Iceland, named for R Blanda
Lagarfljót (Lögurinn)			53	20	112	367	Hydroelectric reservoir, largest lake in E Iceland and the largest longitudinal lake in Iceland in a valley probably arising from a geological fault; fed by meltwater from Vatnajökull
Hágöngulón			37	14	16	52	Natural lake in Highlands, again fed by meltwater from Vatnajökull
Mývatn			37	14	4.5	15	Tourist and ornithological honeypot, N Iceland
Hóp			29–44	11–17	8.5	28	Tidal lagoon on the bay Húnaflói in N Iceland (area varies tidally)
Hvítárvatn			30	12	84	276	Natural lake in the Highlands, fed by meltwater from Langjökull to which it is adjacent
Langisjór			26	10	75	246	Another longitudinal lake fed by meltwater from Vatnajökull
Kvíslavatn	150	5.3	20	7.7			Another lake in the Highlands, but unusual in that it is in a low-lying flat area and is marshy in nature. One of the sources of the Þjórsá.
Sultartangalón	116	4.1	19	7.3			Reservoir further down the Þjórsá valley
Jökulsárlón			18	6.9	248	814	(Iceland's deepest)(1999 estimate - size and depth increasing because of glacier melting); Glacial lagoon
Grænalón			18	6.9			
Skorradalsvatn			15	5.8	48	157	
Sigöldulón	195	6.9	14	5.4			(also known as "Krókslón")
Apavatn			13–14	5.0–5.4			
Heiðarlón			13.5	5.2	51	167	This is a planned hydroelectric reservoir near the mouth of the Þjórsá.
Svínavatn			12	4.6	39	128	
Öskjuvatn			11	4.2	220	720	
Vesturhópsvatn			10	3.9	28	92	In N Iceland near Hóp (see above)
Höfðavatn			10	3.9	6	20	Coastal lagoon in N Iceland
Grímsvötn							A lake that forms in the caldera of the subglacial volcano of the same name. On one theory, the meaning of the name is "Odin’s lake", although several other explanations are possible, given that Grímur is a common man's name in Iceland.
Hestvatn							Small reservoir in SW Iceland (6 km^{2}) ("Horse lake")

== Smaller lakes (<10 km^{2}) ==
- Litlisjór, 9.2 km^{2}, 17 m
- Kleifarvatn, 9.0 km^{2}, >90 m (sensitive to climatic and geological change and was getting smaller - started recovering again in 2004)
- Breiðárlón, 8 km^{2}
- Reyðarvatn, 8.3 km^{2}
- Hítarvatn, 7.6 km^{2}, 24 m
- Miklavatn (Fljót), 7.4 km^{2}
- Miklavatn (Borgarsveit), 6.6 km^{2}, 23 m
- Árneslón, 6.5 km^{2}, 116 m
- Sigríðarstaðavatn, 6.2 km^{2}
- Laxárvatn, 6.0 km^{2}
- Íshólsvatn, 5.2 km^{2}, 39 m
- Úlfljótsvatn, 60 m
- Langavatn, 5.1 km^{2}, 36 m
- Ánavatn, 4.9 km^{2}, 24 m
- Hagalón, 4.6 km^{2}, 116 m
- Hlíðarvatn, 4.4 km^{2}, 21 m
- Arnarvatn hið stóra, 4.3 km^{2}
- Þríhyrningsvatn, 4.3 km^{2}, 33 m
- Hvalvatn, 4.1 km^{2}, 160–180 m
- Másvatn, 4.0 km^{2}, 17 m
- Fjallsárlón, 4.0 km^{2}
- Skjálftavatn, 4.0 km^{2}, 2.5 m
- Stífluvatn, 3.9km^{2}, 23 m
- Fljótavatn, 3.9 km^{2}
- Úlfsvatn, 3.9 km^{2}
- Kálfborgarárvatn, 3.5 km^{2}
- Langavatn, 3.5 km^{2}
- Hraunhafnarvatn, 3.4 km^{2}, 3 m
- Haukadalsvatn, 3.3 km^{2}, 41 m
- Grænavatn, 3.3 km^{2}, 14 m
- Eskihlíðarvatn, 3.3 km^{2}, 5 m
- Ljósavatn, 3.2 km^{2}, 35 m
- Sandvatn, 3.0 km^{2}, 4 m
- Ölvesvatn, 2.8 km^{2}
- Kýlingavötn (Kýlingar), 2.5-3.0 km^{2} (actually two adjoining lakes that nearly form a single body of water)
- Sandvatn, 2.6 km^{2}
- Flóðið, 2.6 km^{2}
- Kvíslavatn nyrðra, 2.6 km^{2}
- Hraunsfjarðarvatn, 2.5 km^{2}, 80 m
- Stóra-Viðarvatn, 2.5 km^{2}, 20 m
- Oddastaðavatn, 2.5 km^{2}, 18 m
- Frostastaðavatn, 2.3 km^{2}, >6 m
- Laugarvatn, 2.1 km^{2}
- Meðalfellsvatn, 2.0 km^{2}, 19 m
- Elliðavatn, 1.8 km^{2}, 7 m
- Hreðavatn, 1.1 km^{2}, 20 m
- Skyggnisvatn
- Hvítavatn
- Tjörnin
- Rauðavatn
- Reynisvatn
