= Jökulsá (Breiðamerkursandur) =

River in Iceland

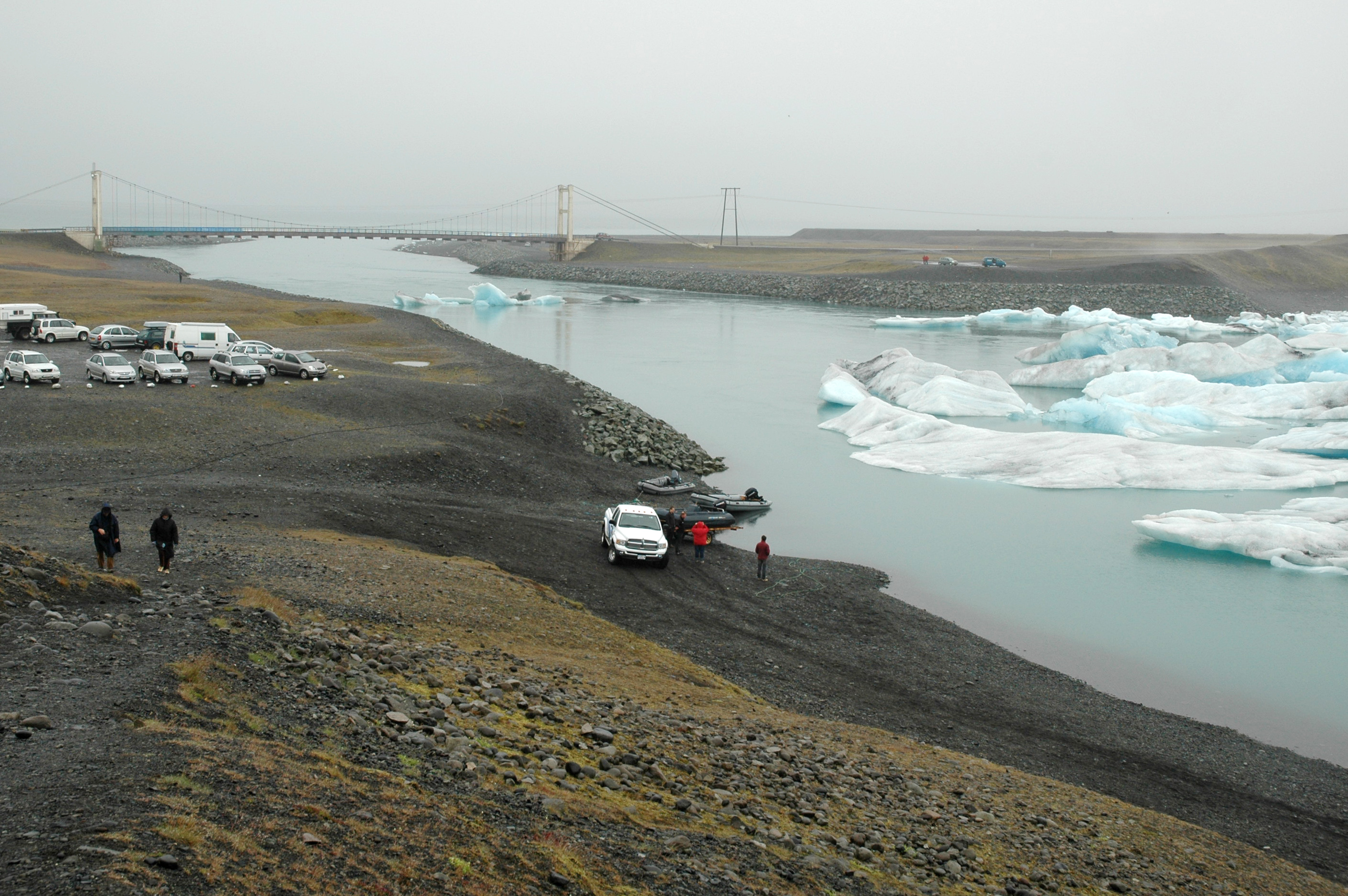
- Jökulsá near Jökulsárlón lake

Location
- Country: Iceland
- Region: Southern
- Municipality: Hornafjörður

Physical characteristics
- Source: Jökulsárlón
  - location: southern Vatnajökull National Park, Iceland
  - coordinates: 64°02′48.8″N 16°10′53.7″W
- Mouth: Atlantic Ocean
- Length: 0.5 km (0.31 mi)
- Discharge
  - average: 250–300 m^{3}/s (8,800–10,600 cu ft/s)

Jökulsá (Icelandic pronunciation: [ˈjœːkʏlsˌauː auː ˈpreiːðaˌmɛr̥kʏrˌsantɪ]) is a river in Southeast Iceland in Austur-Skaftafellssýsla (municipality) in the middle of Breiðamerkursandur, a glacial outwash plain.

It connects the Jökulsárlón glacier lake with the sea, the Atlantic Ocean. The river is very short, at the moment about 500 m. It was still 1,500 m long in 1989, but its length was 1,000 m around the year 1900, when it discharged directly from the Breiðamerkurjökull glacier; the lake did not start to form until 1935–40. The lake grew very fast from 1950 onwards, and changed the course of the river. The medium discharge today is 250–300 m³/s. From time to time, icebergs from the lake enter the river.

Erosion could with time break down the spits and connect the glacier lake directly with the sea, forming a fjord. The government fights the erosion by stabilising the shoreline of the sea and also of the river, not least in order to save the road.

== Jökulsárlón Bridge ==
The Hringvegur (national ring road, route 1) crosses the river on a bridge. The rapid erosion by the sea is threatening the road. If the road were destroyed, East Iceland would be cut off from Reykjavík except by ferry or by a much longer northern route.

The bridge is built from concrete and is around 90 m long. It dates from 1967. Before that, the river crossing was very dangerous. Many people preferred to cross the glacier tongue instead. There was a boat ferry from 1932.
