= Kvisla =

Kvisla may refer to the following locations:

- Kvisla, Buskerud, a village in Hol Municipality in Buskerud county, Norway
- Kvisla, or Kvilten, a village in Engerdal Municipality in Innlandet county, Norway
- Kvisla lake, or Kvíslavatn, a lake in Iceland
