= Fjallsárlón =

Lake in Iceland

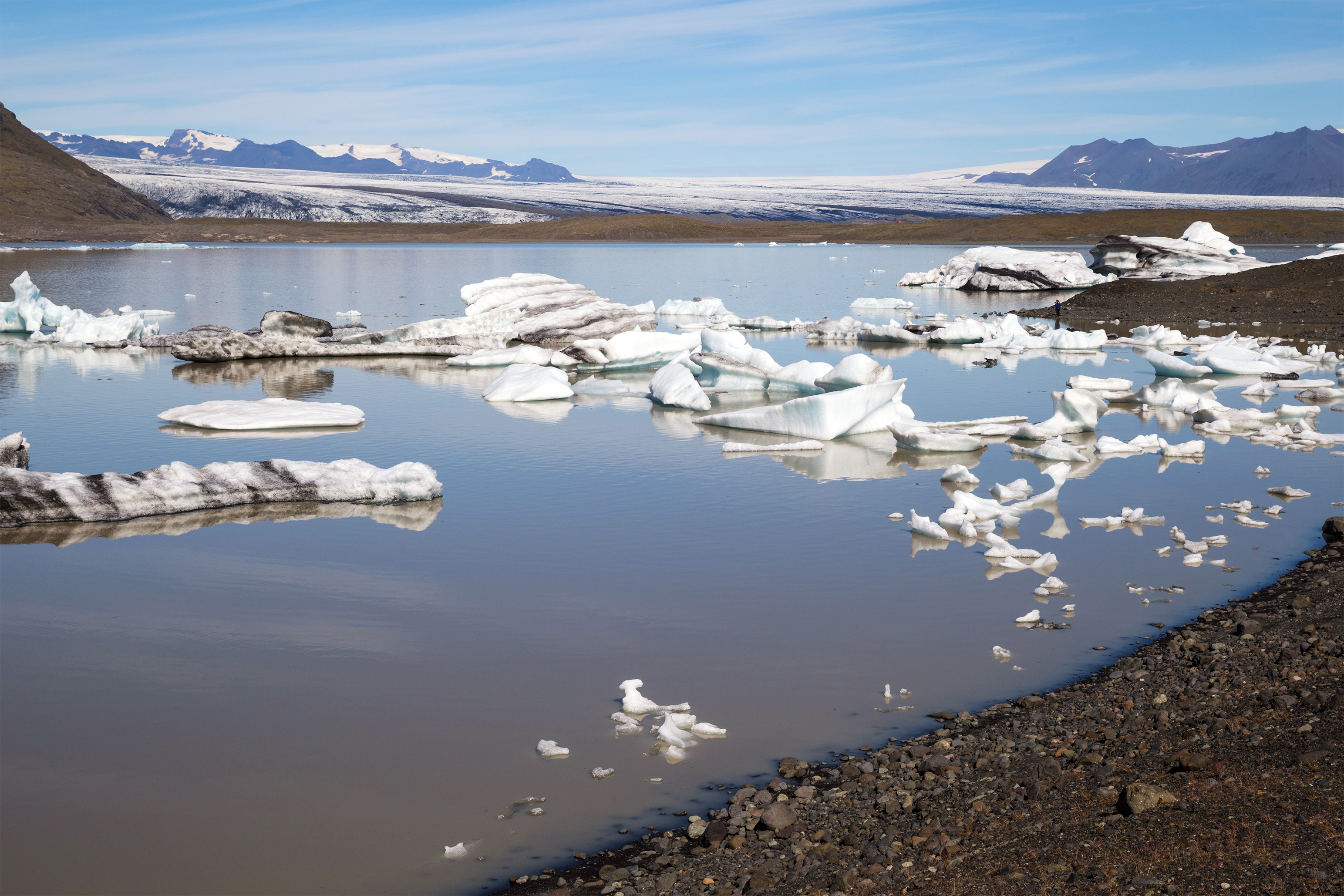

- Location within Iceland
- Location: Iceland
- Coordinates: 64°01′07″N 16°23′06″W
- Lake type: periglacial
- Basin countries: Iceland
- Surface area: 4.0 km^{2} (1.5 sq mi)

Fjallsárlón (Icelandic pronunciation: [ˈfjalsˌaurˌlouːn]) is a glacier lagoon at the south end of the Icelandic glacier Vatnajökull. Fjallsjökull which is part of the bigger glacier reaches down to the water of the lake and some ice-bergs are drifting by on its surface.

The glacier calving into the lagoon is a part of Vatnajökull National Park and the better known glacier lake Jökulsárlón is not far from there. From the glacier lake Breiðárlón a little river flows into the Fjallsárlón.

Above, there is looming the volcano Öræfajökull.

At its shore, in the summertime, it is better to beware of the skúas, big seagulls which have their nests on the ground around the lake.

== See also ==
- List of lakes of Iceland
