= Jökulsá =

Jökulsá (literally glacier river) is the name of several rivers in Iceland.

- Jökulsá á Dal, also known as Jökulsá á Brú or Jökla
- Jökulsá á Fjöllum, the second longest river in Iceland
- Jökulsá á Breiðamerkursandi
- Jökulsá í Fljótsdal, which becomes Lagarfljót
- Jökulsá í Lóni
- Jökulsá á Sólheimasandi
- Jökulsá í Borgarfirði eystri, a river
- Jökulsá í Fáskrúðsfirði, a small river
- Jökulsá á Flateyjardal, a small river

== See also ==
- List of rivers of Iceland
- Austari-Jökulsá
- Vestari-Jökulsá
