= Svínavatn =

- Location within Iceland
- Location: south of Blönduós
- Coordinates: 65°31.7′N 20°3.9′W
- Basin countries: Iceland
- Surface area: 12 km^{2} (4.6 sq mi)
- Max. depth: 39 m (128 ft)
- Surface elevation: 123 m (404 ft)

There are three lakes of the name Svínavatn (Icelandic pronunciation: [ˈsviːnaˌvahtn̥]) in Iceland.

- A lake to the south of Blönduós. Its surface measures 12 km^{2}.
- A very small lake in the valley Heydalur [ˈheiːˌtaːlʏr̥] near Hvammsfjörður on the peninsula of Snæfellsnes.
- Another smaller lake to the west of Blöndulón at the north end of Kjölur highland road.

== See also ==
- List of lakes of Iceland
