= Breiðárlón =

Glacier lake in Iceland

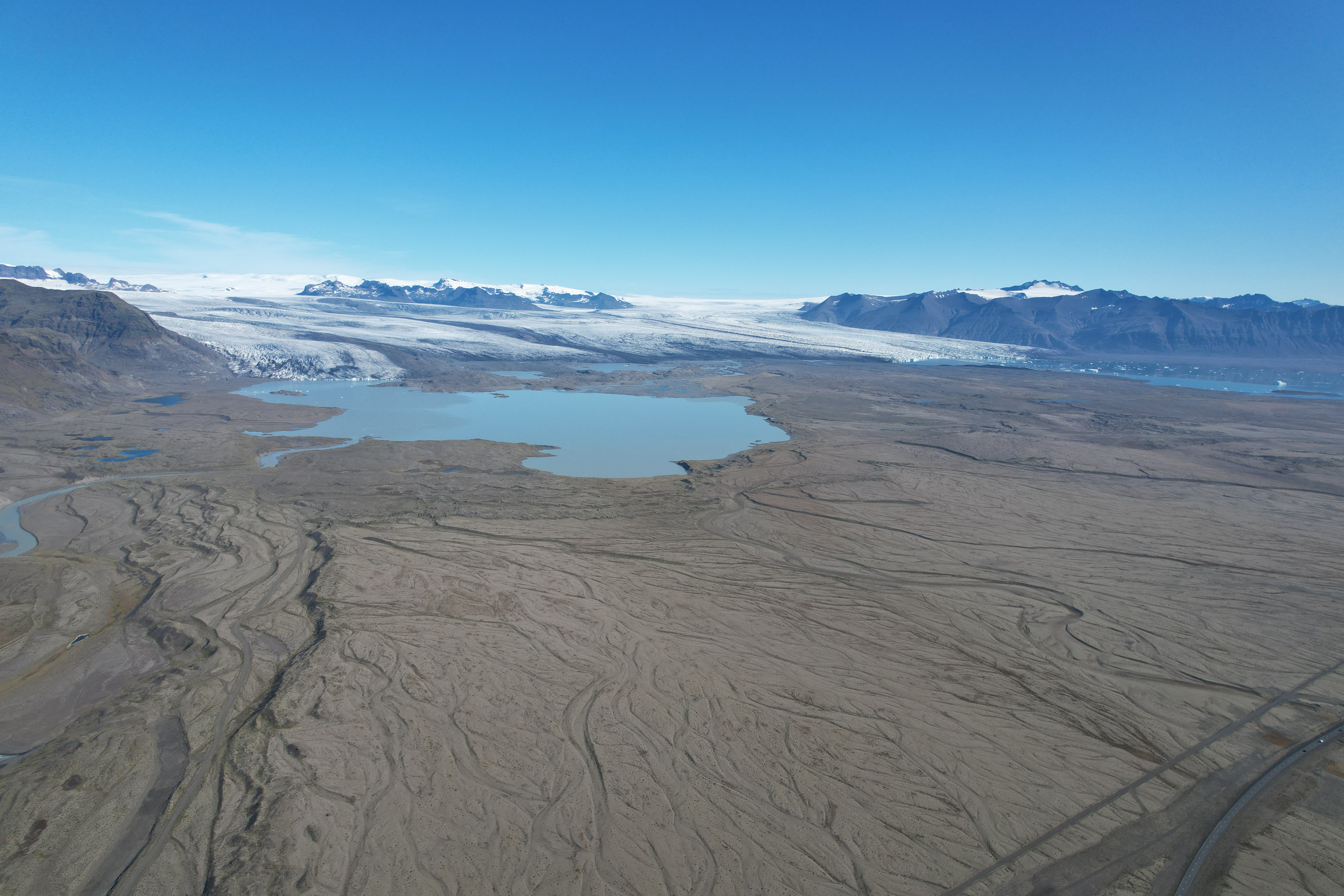

- Location within Iceland
- Location: Iceland
- Coordinates: 64°03′15″N 16°21′59″W
- Type: glacier lake
- Basin countries: Iceland

Breiðárlón (Icelandic pronunciation: [ˈpreiːðˌaurˌlouːn]) is a glacier lake at the south end of the Icelandic glacier Vatnajökull. Formed at the terminus of one of Vatnajökull's biggest outlets, Breiðamerkurjökull, Breiðárlón lies between Fjallsárlón and Jökulsárlón glacier lagoons.

The glacier calving into the lagoon is a part of Vatnajökull National Park, and the better-known glacier lake Jökulsárlón is not far from there. From Breiðárlón, a little river flows into the Fjallsárlón.

== See also ==
- List of lakes of Iceland
