= Sigöldulón =

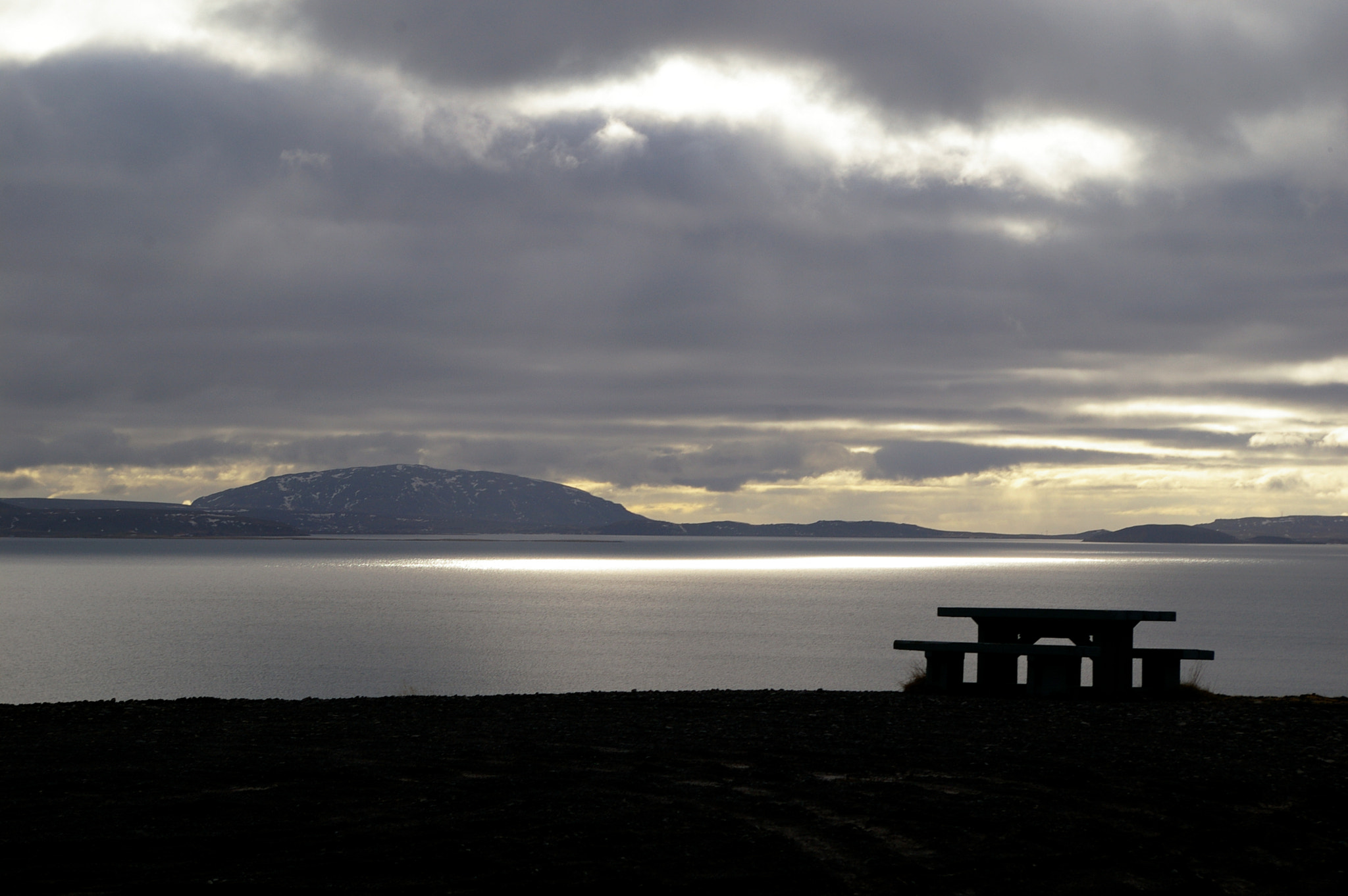
- Sigöldulón, volcano Hekla in the background

- Location within Iceland
- Coordinates: 64°9′8″N 19°3′19″W
- Lake type: reservoir
- Primary inflows: Tungnaá
- Primary outflows: Tungnaá
- Basin countries: Iceland
- Surface area: 14 km^{2} (5.4 sq mi)
- Water volume: 195 hm^{3} (158,000 acre⋅ft)

The lake Sigöldulón (Icelandic pronunciation: [ˈsɪːɣˌœltʏˌlouːn]) is a reservoir in Iceland, also known as Krókslón [ˈkʰrouksˌlouːn]. Situated in the south of the country, not far from Landmannalaugar, it is one of the country's 20 largest lakes at 14 km^{2}.

Both the lake and the nearby power station (Sigölduvirkjun [ˈsɪːɣˌœltʏˌvɪr̥cʏn]) take their names from a tuff ridge at about 600 m above sea level where the river Tungnaá once passed through a canyon. Its waters now flow in tubes into the power station, constructed between 1973 and 1977.

== See also ==
- List of lakes of Iceland
- List of rivers of Iceland
