= Apavatn =

Lake in southern Iceland

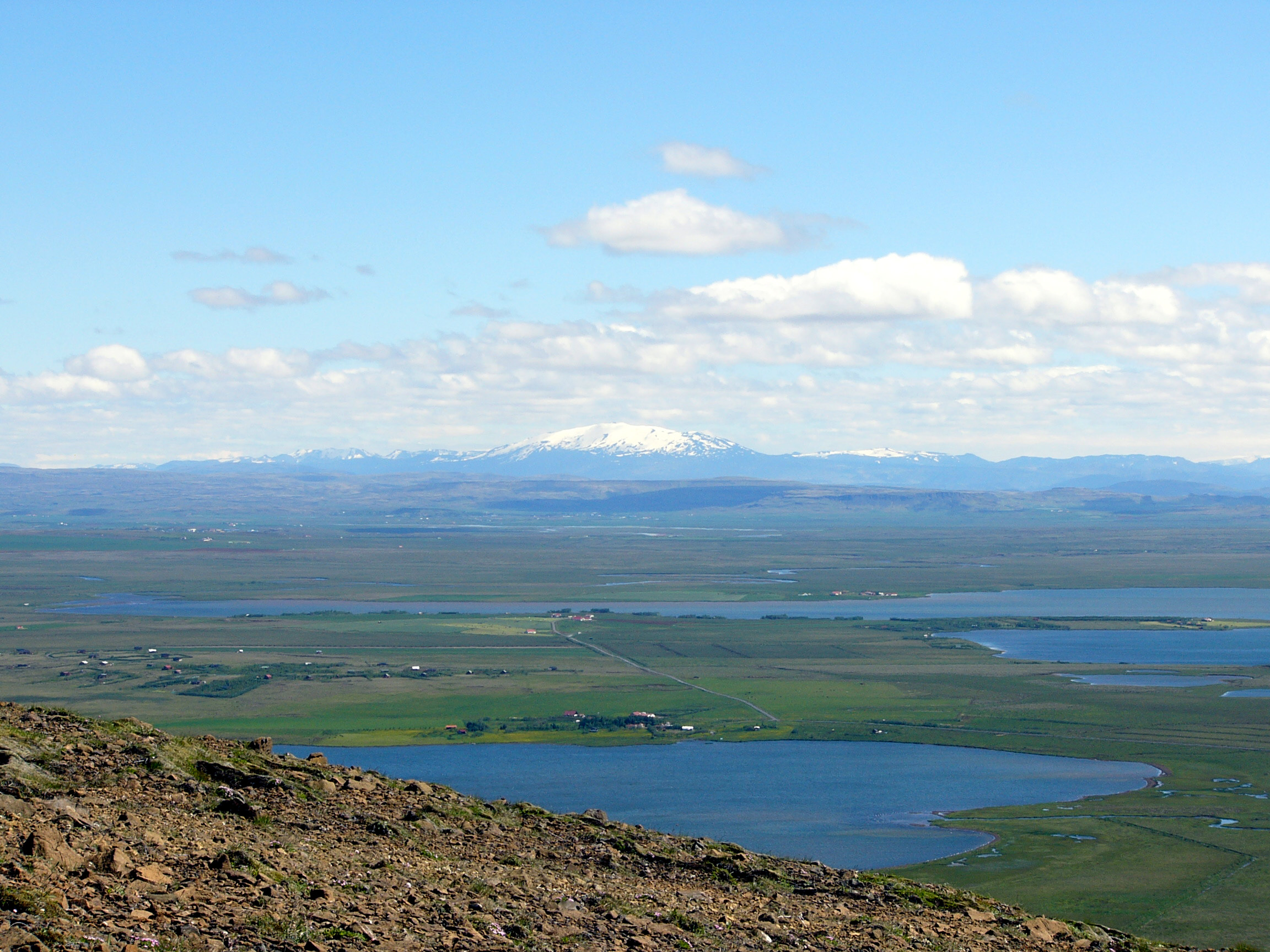
- The lakes Laugarvatn and Apavatn from mount Laugarvatnsfjall. In the background the volcano Hekla.

- Location within Iceland
- Location: southwest Iceland
- Coordinates: 64°10′N 20°40′W
- Basin countries: Iceland
- Surface area: 13 km^{2} (5.0 sq mi)

Apavatn (Icelandic pronunciation: [ˈaːpaˌvahtn̥]) is a lake in southwest Iceland. With a surface area of around 13 km^{2} it is much larger than the neighbouring lake of Laugarvatn, which lies to the north of Apavatn.

Apavatn is renowned for its good fishing, especially trout.

== See also ==
- List of lakes of Iceland
