= Reynisvatn =

Lake in Iceland

Coordinates: 64°07′26″N 21°43′55″W

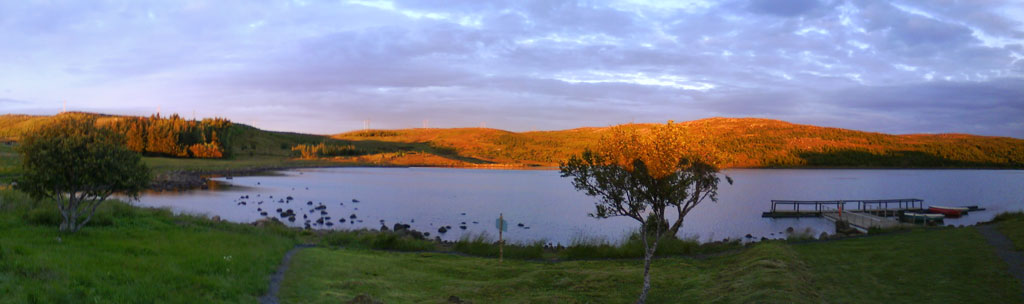
Reynisvatn

Reynisvatn is a lake on the eastern side of Reykjavík, east of Grafarholt og Úlfarsárdalur. The lake is a popular fishing spot, with rainbow trout being released.

== See also ==
- List of lakes of Iceland
