= Laugarvatn =

Lake in Iceland

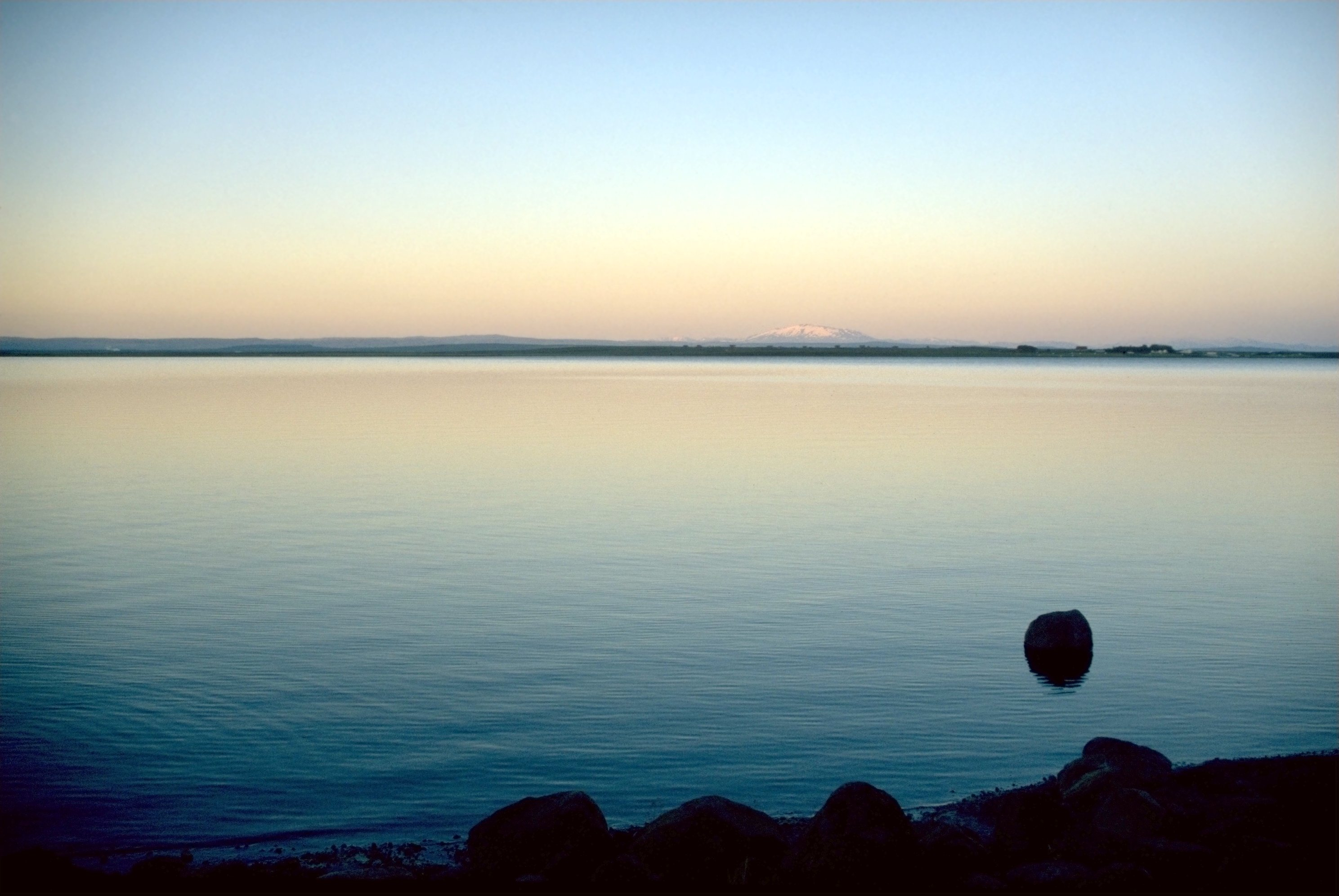

- Location within Iceland
- Location: Iceland
- Coordinates: 64°12′40″N 20°42′40″W
- Basin countries: Iceland
- Surface area: 2.14 km^{2} (0.83 sq mi)
- Settlements: Bláskógabyggð

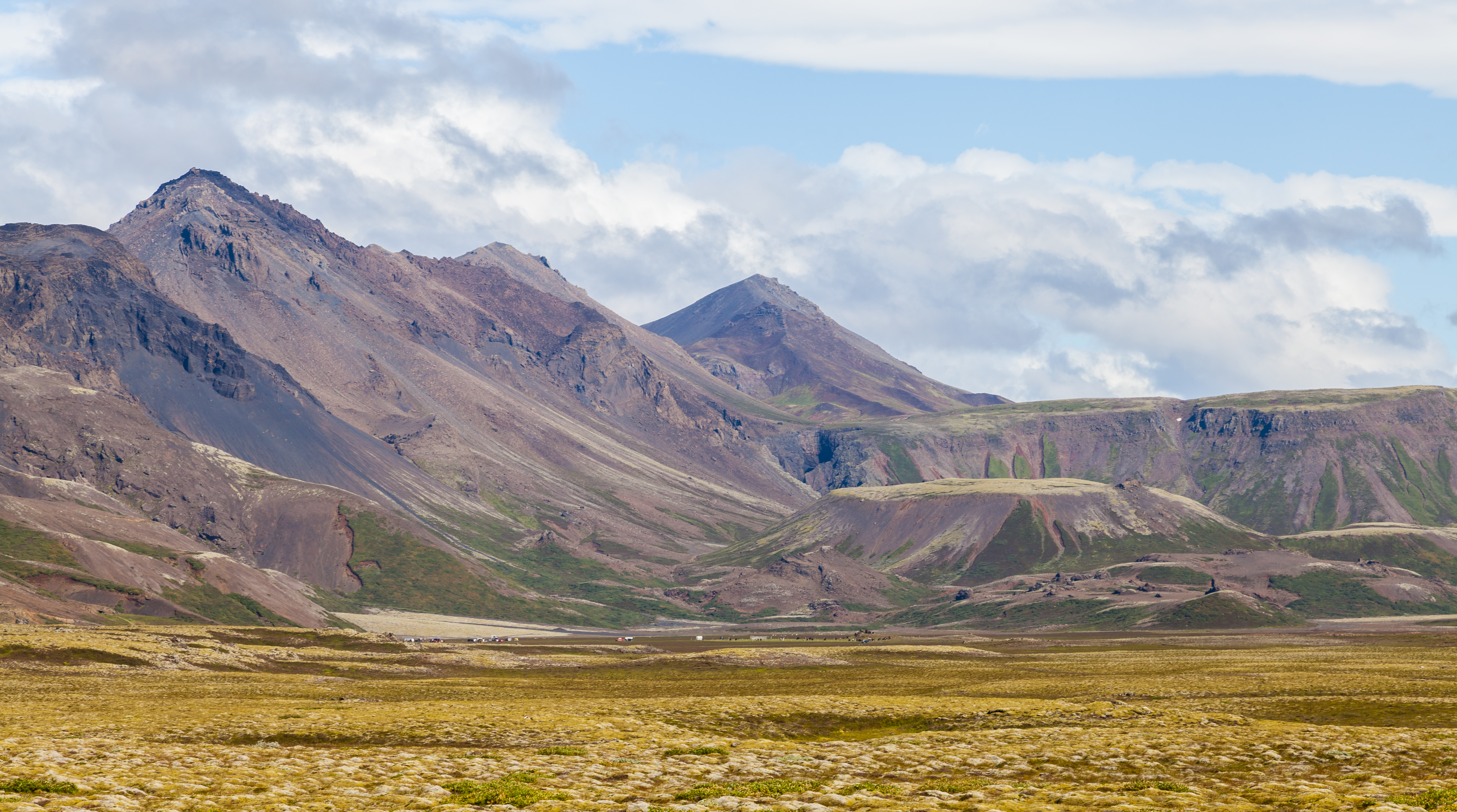
Landscape nearby the town.

Laugarvatn (Icelandic pronunciation: [ˈlœyːɣarˌvahtn̥]) is the name of a lake and a small town in the south of Iceland. The lake is smaller than the neighbouring Apavatn.

== Tourism ==
Laugarvatn lies within the Golden Circle, a popular tourist route, and acts as a staging post. The town had a population of about 200 in 2010, and lies predominantly along the west side of the lake. The lake contains geothermal springs under its surface, making it a popular swimming spot with some warm patches along the shoreline year-round.

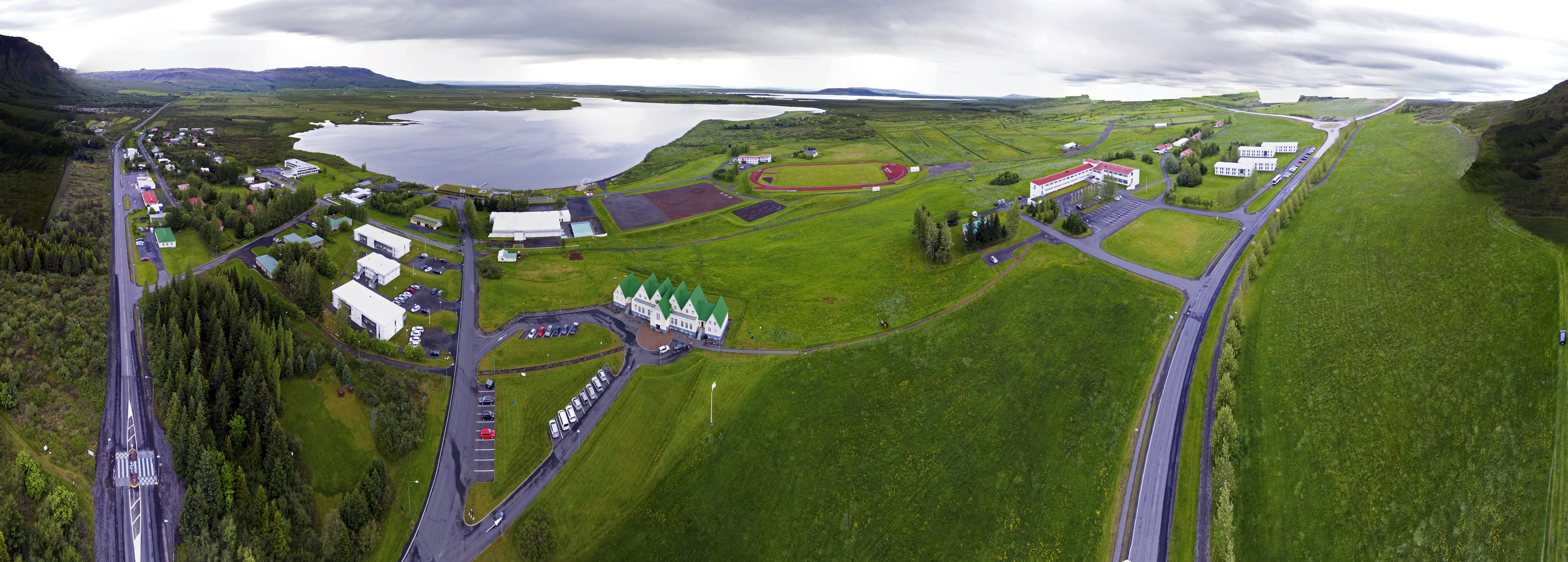
Aerial panorama of Laugarvatn, taken in June 2017

== Education ==
Menntaskólinn að Laugarvatni (ML), a boarding gymnasium with approximately 200 students, is located in the town. Iceland University of Education's division of Sport and Physical Education was also located here.

== See also ==
- List of lakes of Iceland
