= Breiðamerkursandur =

Outwash plain in Iceland

Coordinates: 64°3′30″N 16°10′30″W

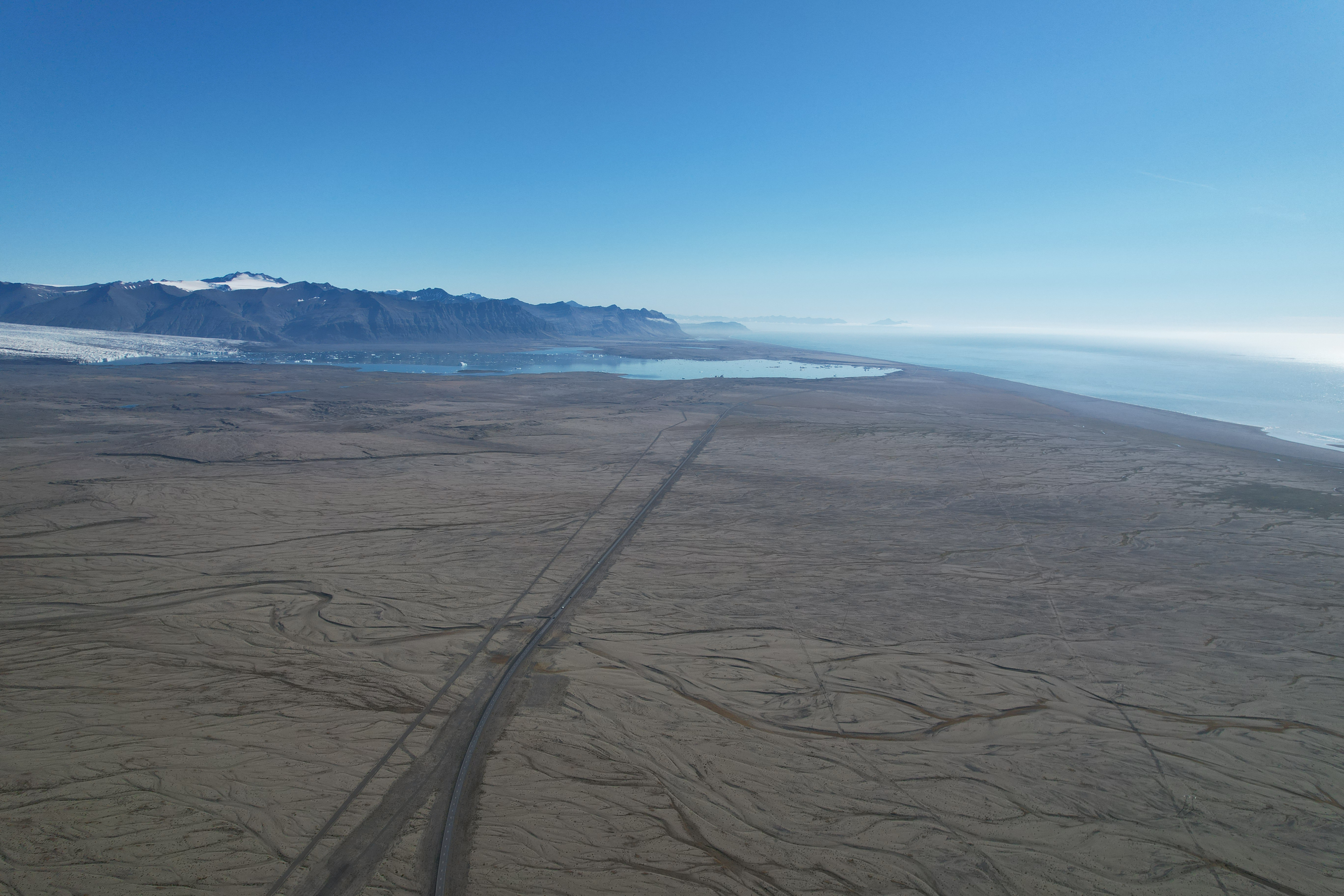
Areal view of Breiðamerkursandur.

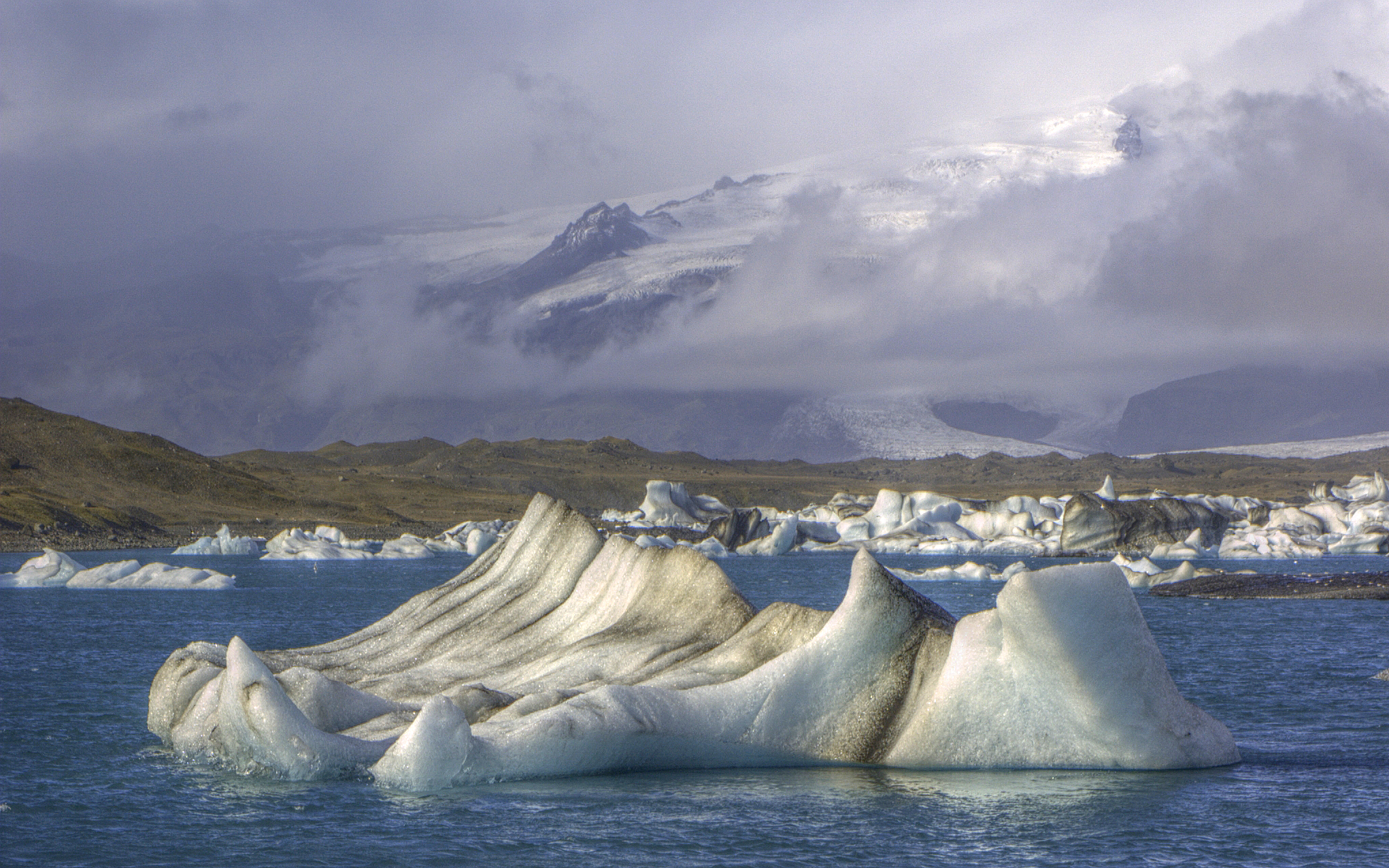
Jökulsárlón is situated on Breiðamerkursandur, below the subglacial volcano Öræfajökull (zoomed) behind.

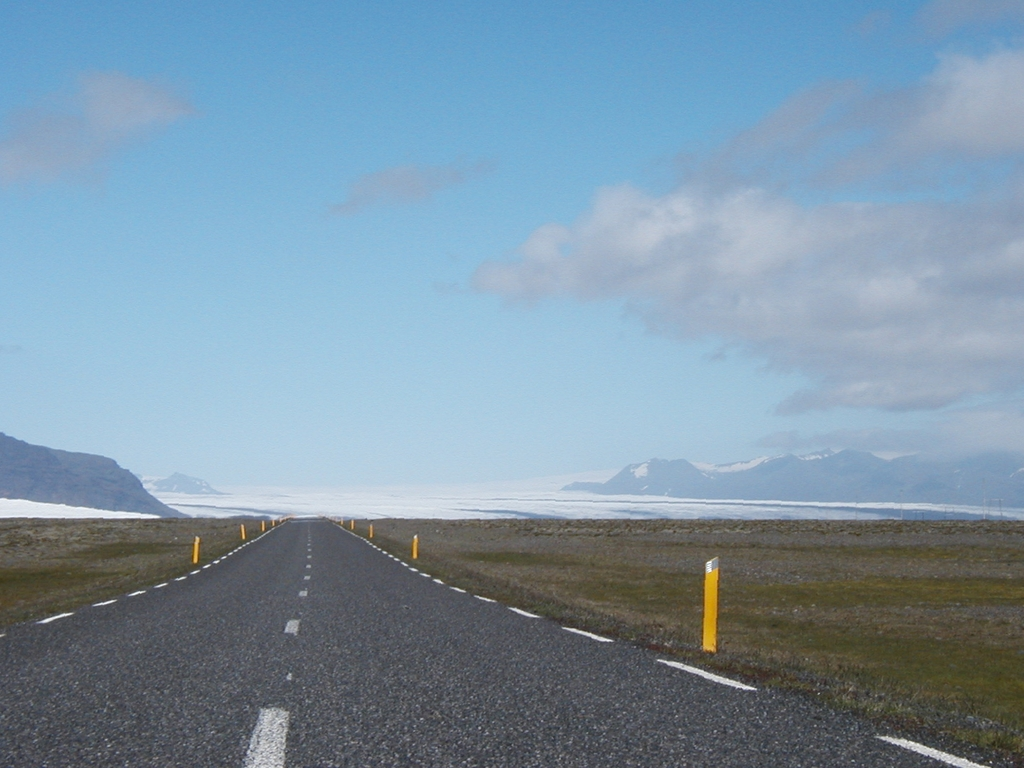
Breidamerkursandur from Road No.1, to the left is part of Öræfajökull, Breiðamerkurjökull glacier just in front.

Breiðamerkursandur (Icelandic pronunciation: [ˈpreiːðaˌmɛr̥kʏrˌsantʏr̥], lit. 'Sand of Wide Woodland') is a glacial outwash plain in southeast Iceland. The area is mostly sand, although some vegetation is beginning to grow in the area.

Breiðamerkursandur is located in the municipality of Hornafjörður. It was formed by the glaciers Breiðamerkurjökull, Fjallsjökull and Hrútárjökull during the last few centuries. As the climate cooled during the little ice age, the glaciers advanced down and out to the lowlands, piling gravel ahead. The glaciers are sources of muddy rivers who commonly change their channels frequently and carry the sediment that the weight of the glacier grinds down and across a large area. The pro glacial lake Jökulsárlón, one of Iceland's best-known tourist attractions, is located on Breiðamerkursandur.

The glaciers that formed the sandur are a part of Vatnajökull, and therefore a part of Vatnajökull National Park. In 2017, the borders of the park were changed to include also the plain itself and the Jökulsárlón lake.

Breiðamerkursandur is an important breeding ground for birds, for example Arctic tern and great skua.
