= Hvalvatn =

Lake in Iceland

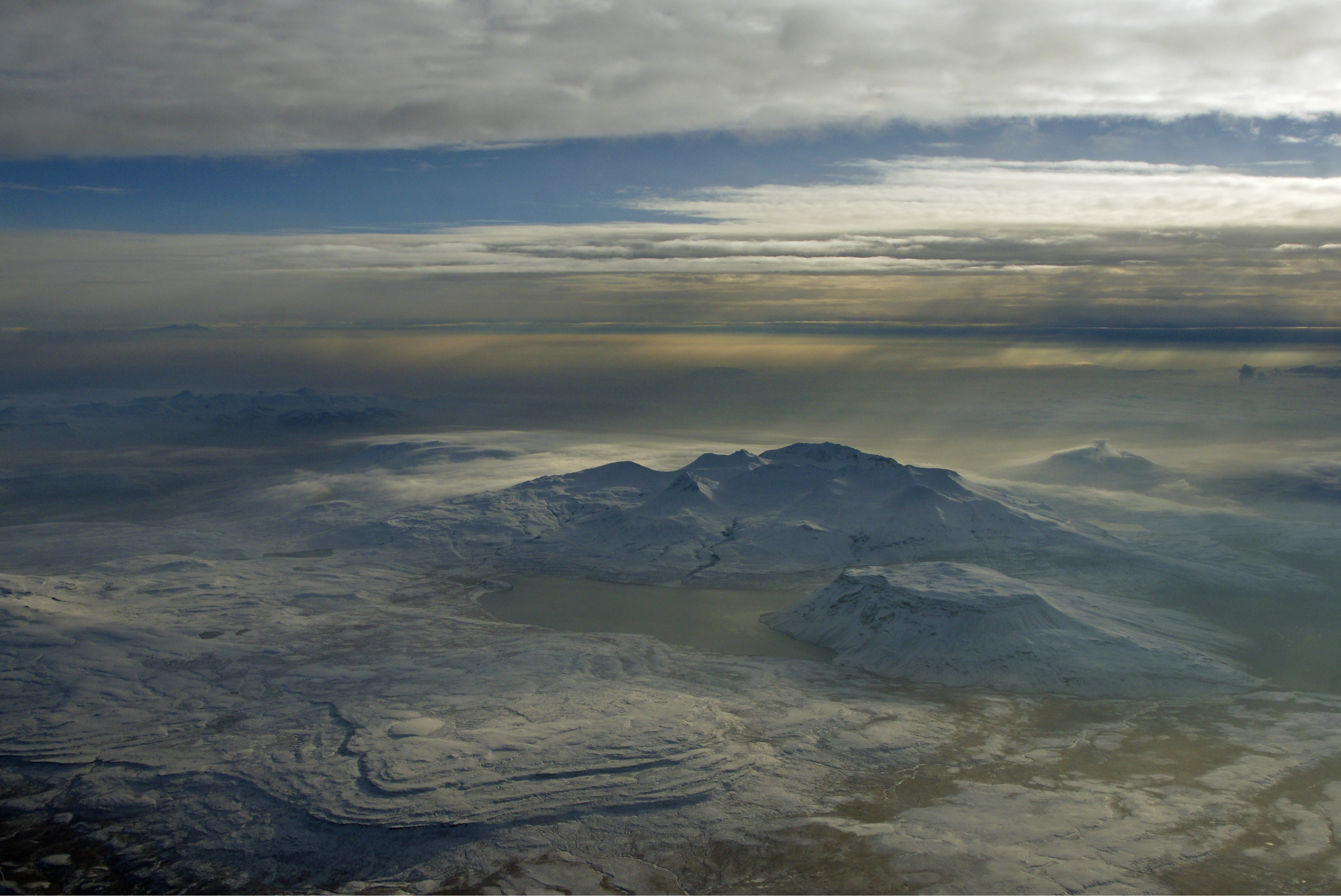
- Aerial photograph of the region: Hvalvatn near Hvalfell and in front of Botnssúlur; air pollution caused by Bárðarbunga eruptions (October 2014)

- Location within Iceland
- Coordinates: 64°23′N 21°10′W
- Basin countries: Iceland
- Surface area: 4.1 km^{2} (1.6 sq mi)
- Max. depth: 180 m (590 ft)
- Surface elevation: 378 m (1,240 ft)

The lake Hvalvatn (Icelandic pronunciation: [ˈkʰvalˌvahtn̥]) is situated east of Hvalfjörður in the western portion of Iceland. It lies to the east of the tuya Hvalfell [ˈkʰvalˌfɛtl̥]. The surface measures 4.1 km^{2} (1.6 sq mi), and its greatest depth is 180 m (590 ft).

Not far from Hvalvatn is Glymur, the second highest waterfall in the country. Hiking trails lead both to the lake and to the waterfall.

== See also ==
- List of lakes of Iceland
- Waterfalls of Iceland
