= Grænalón =

Glacial lake of Iceland

- Location within Iceland
- Coordinates: 64°10′N 17°23′W
- Basin countries: Iceland
- Surface area: 18 km^{2} (6.9 sq mi)

Grænalón (Icelandic pronunciation: [ˈkraiːnaˌlouːn], "Green Lagoon") was one of the glacial lakes of the Icelandic glacier Vatnajökull. It was situated in the south of Iceland. Its surface measured 18 km^{2} during the 20th Century.

Grænalón was bound and naturally dammed by the northwestern edge of Skeiðarárjökull glacier, which is a southbound downhill glacial flow from the body of Vatnajökull. Because of the glacier's considerable thinning and shortening in the last few decades, Grænalón has almost completely drained and disappeared. At present, the lake does not exist as more than pond, as seen in Google Timelapse.

== See also ==
- List of lakes of Iceland
