= Frostastaðavatn =

Lake in Southern Region, Iceland

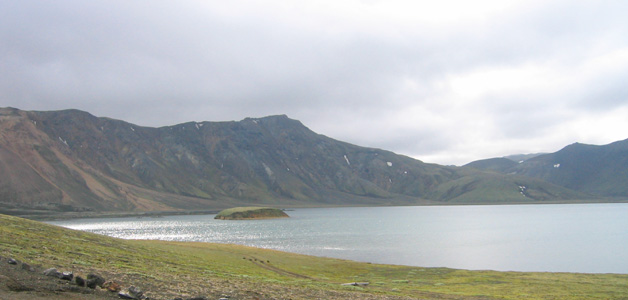

- Location within Iceland
- Location: Highlands of Iceland
- Coordinates: 64°01′N 19°04′W
- Basin countries: Iceland

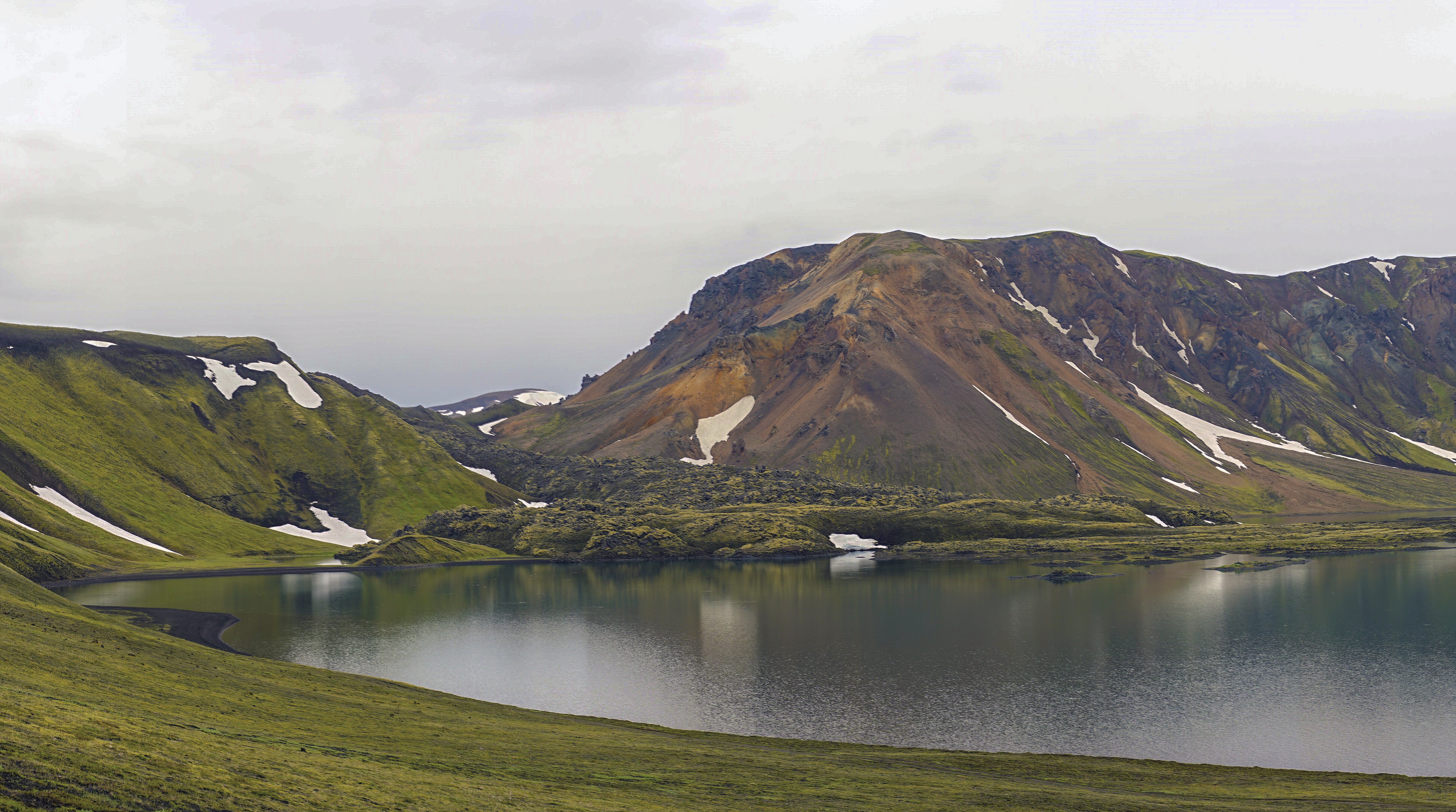
Námshraun, the mixed lava field

Frostastaðavatn ([ˈfrɔstaˌstaːðaˌvahtn̥], Icelandic for lake of the frosty place) is a lake in Iceland. It is situated in the Highlands of Iceland, not far from the famous mountains of Landmannalaugar and the volcano Hekla.

Evidence of volcanism shows around this lake; for example in the famous mixed lava flows from the 1477 combined eruptions of the Torfajökull and Bárðarbunga volcanic systems reaching down to the shore (lava flows of rhyolitic as well as basaltic composition).

Two highland roads run along its shore, Fjallabaksleið nyrðri (F 208) and Landmannaleið (F 225).

== See also ==
- List of lakes in Iceland
