= Grafarholt og Úlfarsárdalur =

Coordinates: 64°07′35″N 21°46′02″W

Grafarholt and Úlfarsárdalur
- District
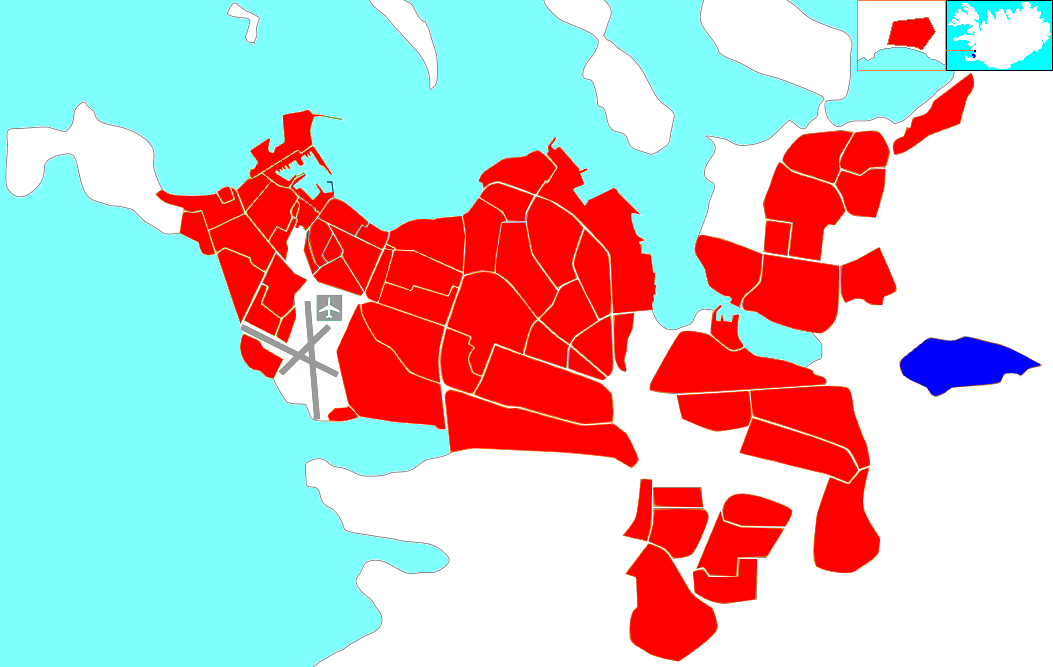
- Country: Iceland
- Municipality: Reykjavík

Area
  - District: 22.5 km^{2} (8.7 sq mi)
  - Urban: 3.1 km^{2} (1.2 sq mi)

Population (2025)
  - District: 8,769
  - Density: 390/km^{2} (1,010/sq mi)
- Postal code: IS-113

Úlfarsfell (Icelandic pronunciation: [ˈulvar̥sˌfɛtl̥]) or Grafarholt og Úlfarsárdalur [ˈkraːvarˌhɔl̥t ɔɣ ˈulvar̥sˌaurˌtaːlʏr̥], is a district of Reykjavík, the capital of Iceland, and forms part of the eastern suburbs.

A small lake, Reynisvatn, is situated to the east of the district.
