= Sultartangalón =

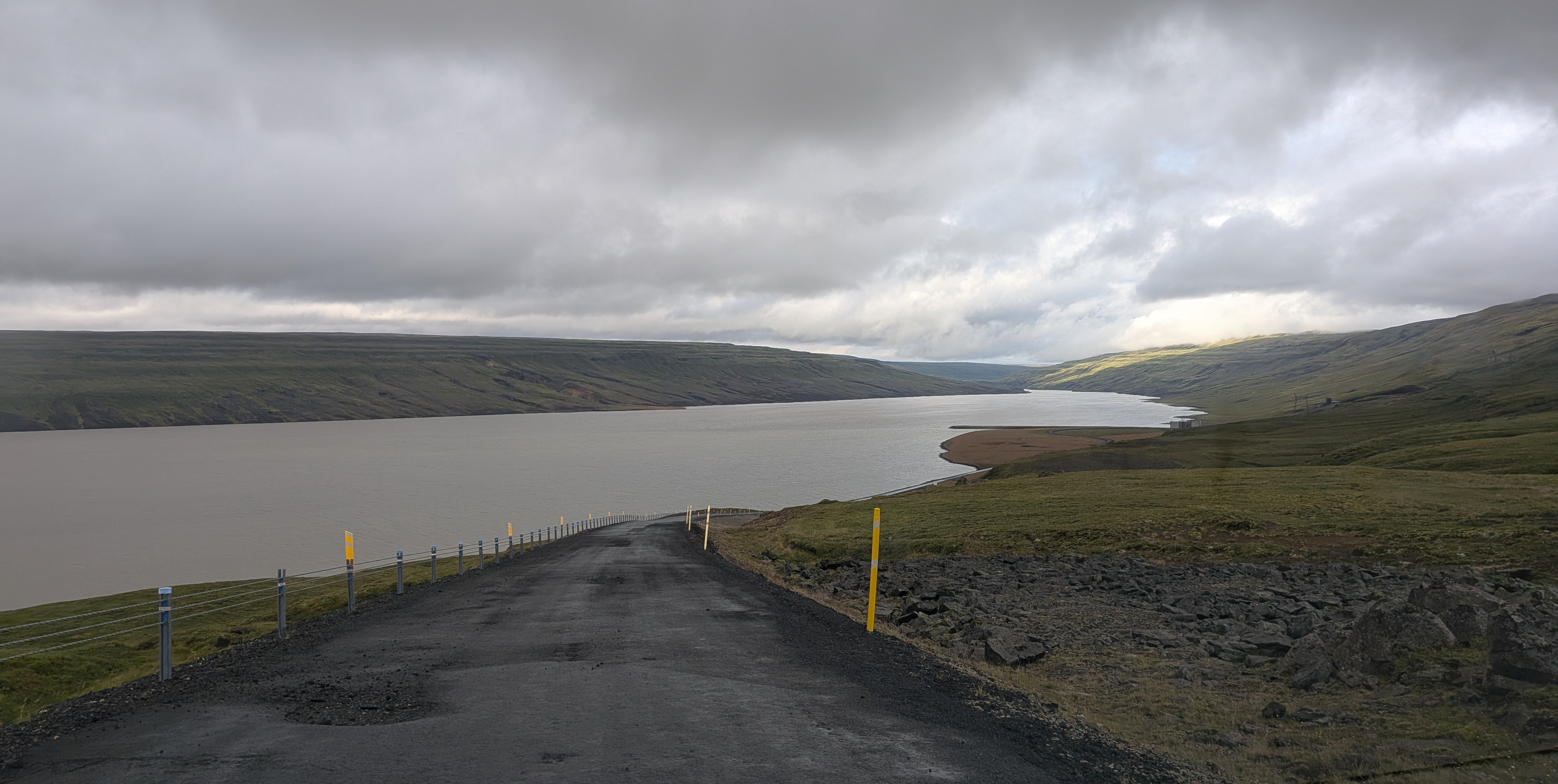

- Location within Iceland
- Location: Highlands of Iceland
- Coordinates: 64°12′34″N 19°28′48″W
- Lake type: reservoir
- Primary inflows: Þjórsá and Tungnaá
- Primary outflows: Þjórsá
- Basin countries: Iceland
- Surface area: 20 km^{2} (7.7 sq mi)
- Water volume: 109 gigalitres (88,000 acre⋅ft)
- Surface elevation: 297 m (974 ft)

The lake Sultartangarlón (Icelandic pronunciation: [ˈsʏl̥tarˌtʰauŋkarˌlouːn]) is situated in the Highlands of Iceland to the north of the volcano Hekla. It is a reservoir of the river Þjórsá, formed when the Þjórsá and Tungnaá rivers were dammed during the construction of the Sultartangi Hydropower Plant. Its surface area is 20 km^{2}.

The reservoir is one of multiple reservoirs that have been constructed along the Þjórsá river for hydropower generation.

== See also ==
- List of lakes of Iceland
- Geography of Iceland
