= Kvíslavatn =

Lake in Iceland

- Location within Iceland
- Location: Highlands of Iceland
- Coordinates: 64°33′52″N 18°34′18″W
- Basin countries: Iceland
- Surface area: 20 km^{2} (7.7 sq mi) approx

Kvíslavatn (Icelandic pronunciation: [ˈkʰvistlaˌvahtn̥]) is a lake in Iceland. The lake is situated in the Highlands of Iceland to the west of Sprengisandur highland road and to the south-east of the glacier Hofsjökull. Its surface area is about 20 km^{2}.

== See also ==
- List of lakes of Iceland
