= Tungnaá =

River in Iceland

Coordinates: 64°11′34″N 19°29′07″W

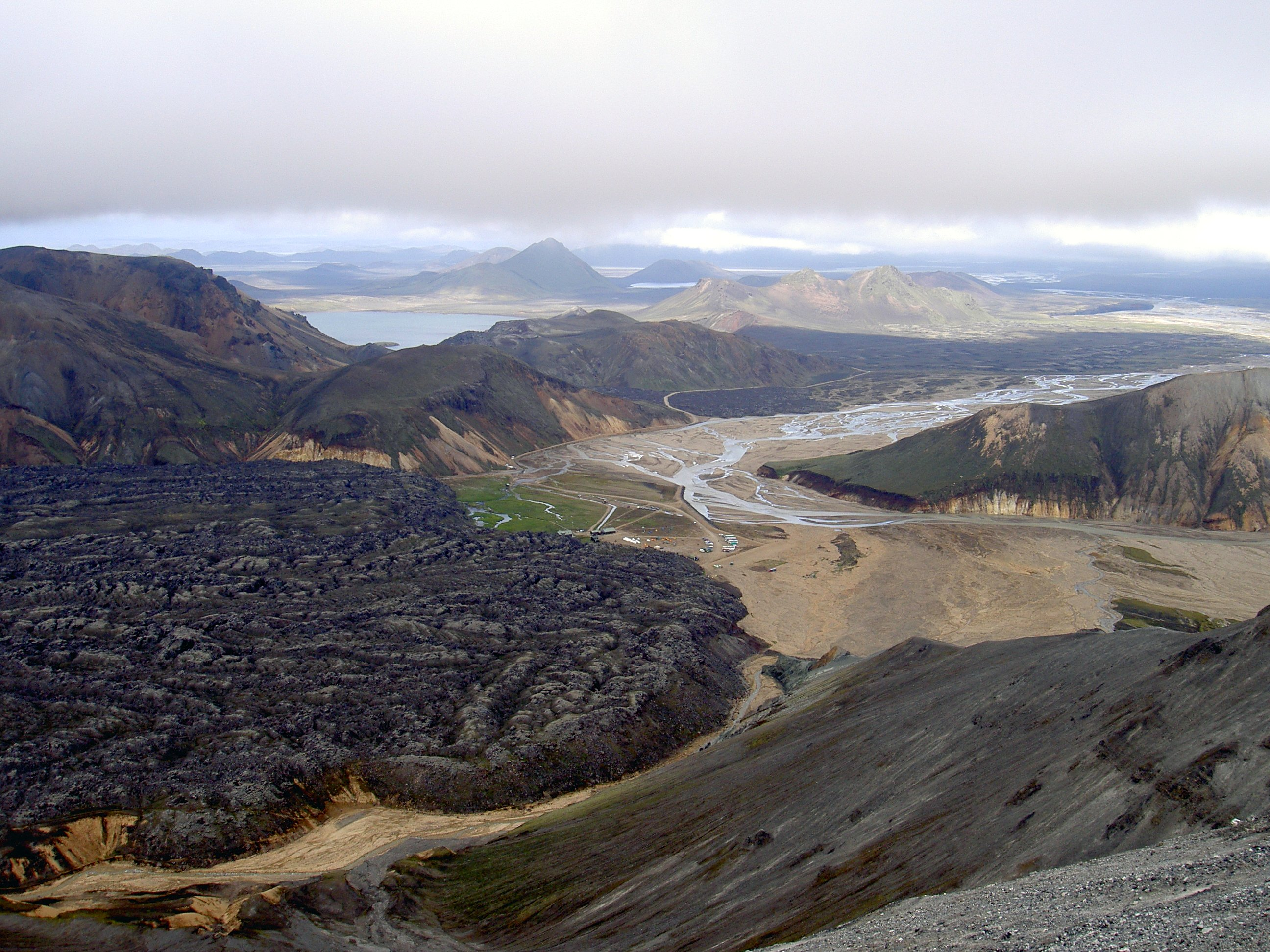
Tungnaá

The Tungnaá (Icelandic pronunciation: [ˈtʰuŋnaˌauː, ˈtʰunːa-]) is a river in the southern Highlands of Iceland. It flows from the western edge of Vatnajökull to the reservoir Sultartangalón, where it joins the Þjórsá. The river has been used extensively for hydroelectricity, with power stations at Vatnsfell, Sigalda, Hrauneyjafoss, and Sultartangi.

== See also ==
- List of rivers of Iceland
