= Hágöngulón =

- Location within Iceland
- Location: Highlands of Iceland
- Coordinates: 64°34′N 18°10′W
- Type: lake
- Surface area: 37 square kilometres (14 mi^{2})

Hágöngulón (Icelandic pronunciation: [ˈhauːˌkœyŋkʏˌlouːn]) is a lake in the Highlands of Iceland. It is 37 square kilometres (14 mi^{2}) in area and it is situated nearly 10 kilometres (6.2 mi) east of the Sprengisandur road, one of the highland tracks which cross Iceland from the south to the north, and a similar distance west of the largest glacier Vatnajökull. Immediately to the south is the lava field Hágönguhraun [ˈhauːˌkœyŋkʏˌr̥œyːn]. It is fed by various streams consisting of meltwater from Vatnajökull and is drained by Kaldakvísl [ˈkʰaltaˌkʰvistl̥], a tributary of the Þjórsá, both of which flow in a southwest direction towards the southwest coast.
