= Vesturhópsvatn =

Lake in northern Iceland

Höfðavatn
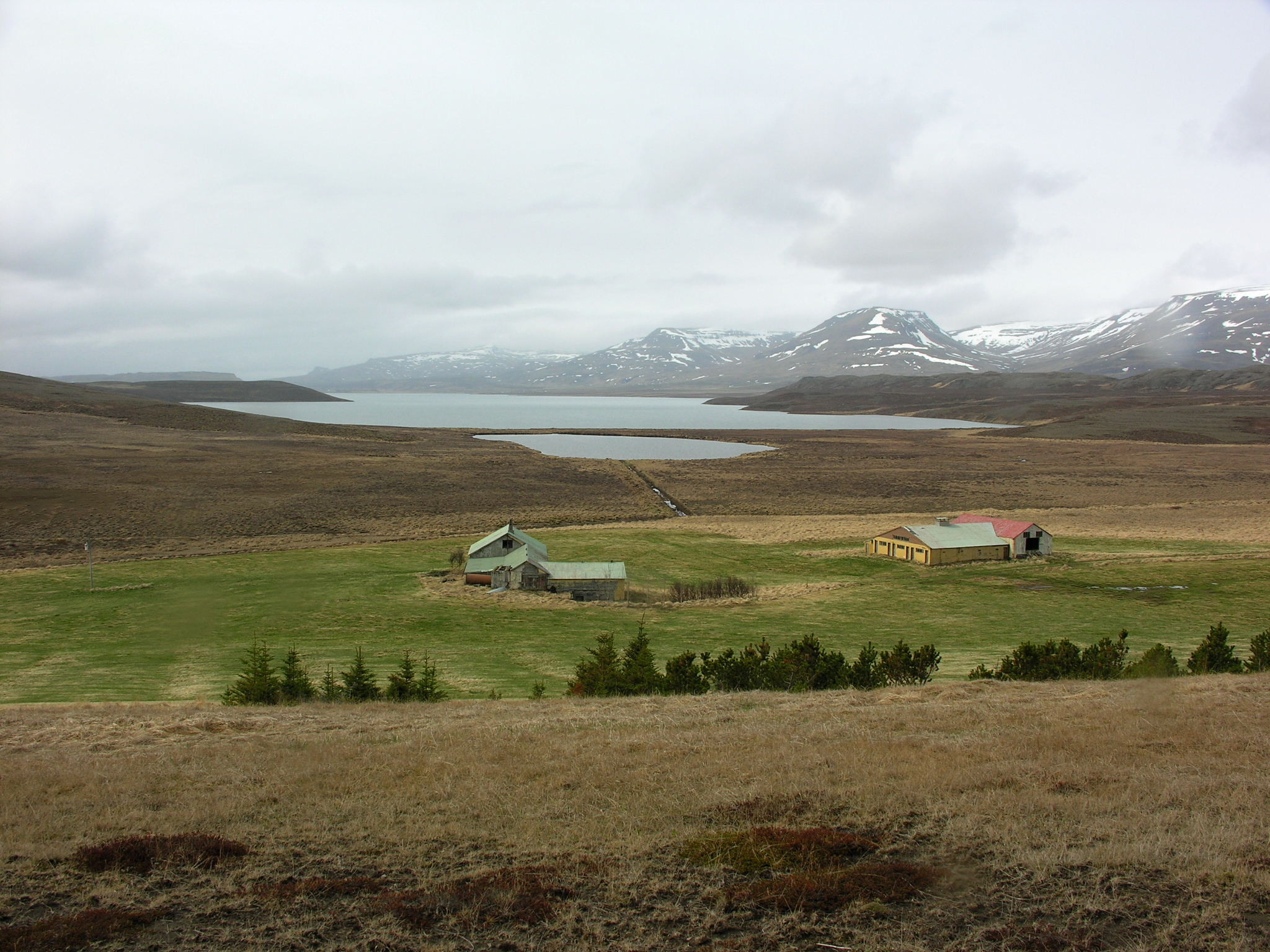
- Vesturhópsvatn

- Location within Iceland
- Location: Húnaþing vestra
- Coordinates: 65°28′09″N 20°39′05″W
- Basin countries: Iceland
- Surface area: 10 km^{2} (3.9 sq mi)
- Average depth: 28 m (92 ft)
- Max. depth: 28 m (92 ft)

Vesturhópsvatn is a lake in northern Iceland. It is located in the municipality of Húnaþing vestra.

== Geography ==
The surface of the Vesturhópsvatn is about 10 km^{2}; the maximum depth is 28m.
