= Blöndulón =

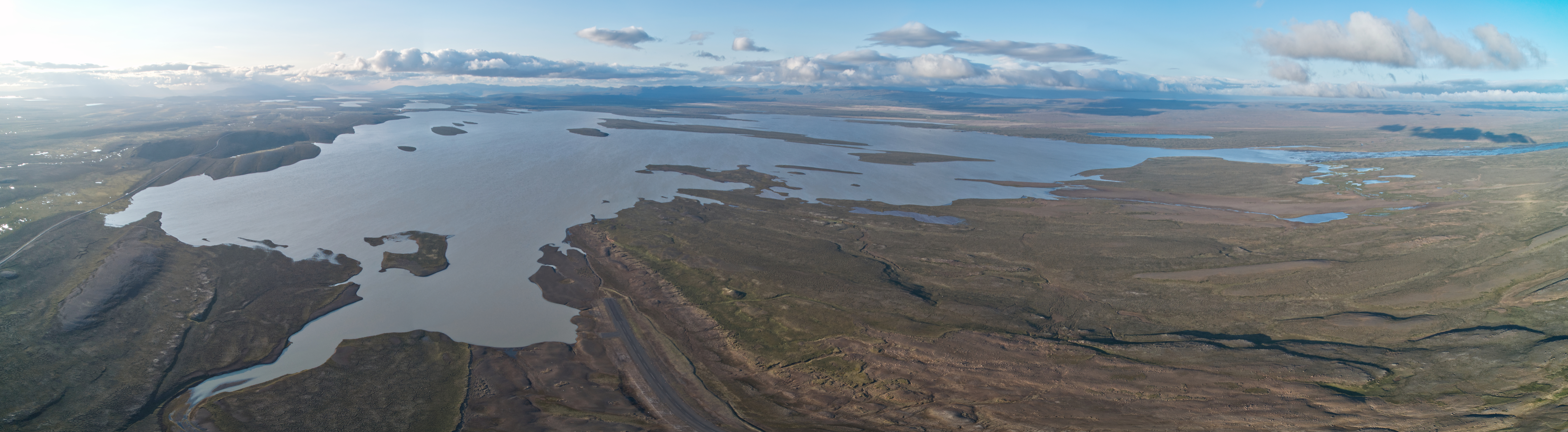

- Location within Iceland
- Coordinates: 65°10′53″N 19°38′58″W
- Lake type: reservoir
- Primary inflows: Blanda, Kolkukvíslar
- Primary outflows: Blanda
- Basin countries: Iceland
- Surface area: 57 km^{2} (22 sq mi)
- Max. depth: 39 m (128 ft)
- Water volume: 400 gigalitres (320,000 acre⋅ft)

At 57 km^{2}, Blöndulón (Icelandic pronunciation: [ˈplœntʏˌlouːn]) is one of Iceland's largest lakes. It was created in 1984-1991 as a reservoir for the Blönduvirkjun [ˈplœntʏˌvɪr̥cʏn] power plant, and has a depth of 39 m. It is situated near the Kjölur highland road in the Highlands of Iceland. The hot springs of Hveravellir are situated some 25 km to the south.

== See also ==
- List of lakes of Iceland
