= Breiðamerkurjökull =

Outlet glacier in Iceland

- Vatnajökull
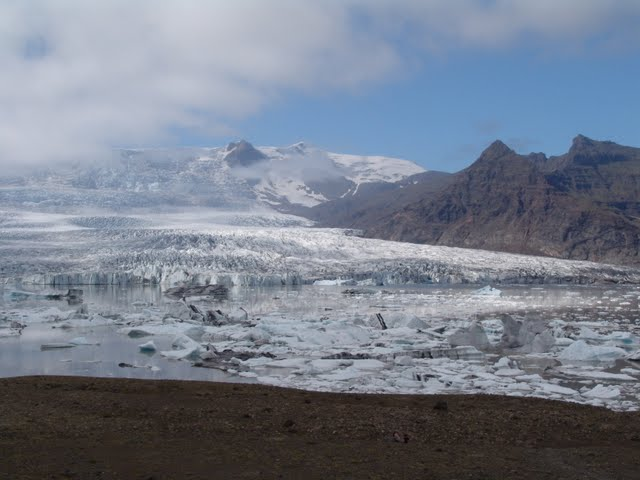
- Breiðamerkurjökull, Iceland
- Map of Vatnajökull ice cap showing its named glacial catchments (light grey shading with white outline). Catchments associated with Breiðamerkurjökull are outlined in turquoise. Clicking on the map to enlarge it enables mouse over that allows identification of individual named glacial catchments.
- Type: Ice cap
- Location: Iceland
- Coordinates: 64°9′11″N 16°24′0″W
- Terminus: Jökulsárlón and Breiðárlón
- Status: Retreating

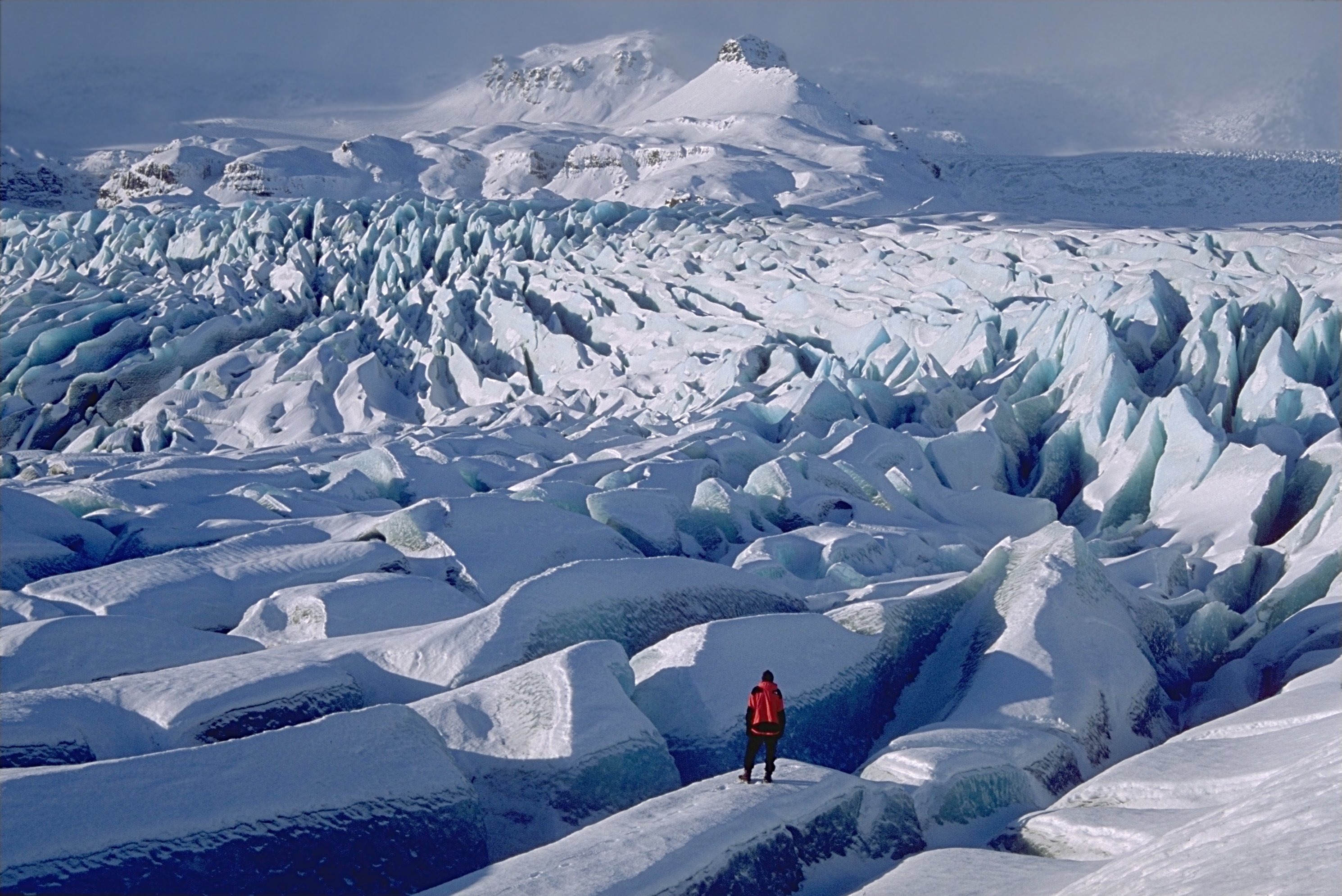
The Breiðamerkurjökull Glacier field

Breiðamerkurjökull (Icelandic pronunciation: [ˈpreiːðaˌmɛr̥kʏrˌjœːkʏtl̥], lit. 'Glacier of Wide Woodland') is an outlet glacier of the larger glacier of Vatnajökull and a piedmont glacier in the southern part of Vatnajökull National Park, Iceland. Emerging as a tongue of the Vatnajökull, it ends in two lagoons, famous Jökulsárlón and smaller and less known Breiðárlón. Over time, it has gradually been breaking down.

As the icebergs break away from the tongue of the glacier, they drift slowly to the mouth of the lagoon and eventually join the ocean. They are stated to float in the deep lagoon for 5 years, which is around 300 m (980 ft) deep and spreads over an area of 17 km^{2} (6.6 sq mi). It was near the ring road until 35 years ago before retreating rapidly and forming the Jökulsárlón lagoon. The 752 m (2,467 ft) high Breiðamerkurfjall [ˈpreiːðaˌmɛr̥kʏrˌfjatl̥] mountain was enclosed by the Breiðamerkurjökull and Fjallsjökull [ˈfjalsˌjœːkʏtl̥] before the drifting started and formed the Breiðárlón [ˈpreiːðˌaurˌlouːn] lagoon, which is not as dramatic as the Jökulsárlón lagoon.

The location has been used for many films and commercials. The glacier was used in Lara Croft: Tomb Raider as a stand-in for Siberia.

== History ==
The first settlers arrived in Iceland around 900 AD when the edge of the glacier tongue of Breiðamerkurjökull glacier was about 20 kilometres (12 mi) further north of the present location. During the Little Ice Age between 1600 and 1900 AD, with cooler temperatures prevailing in these latitudes, the glacier advanced to about 1 kilometre (0.62 mi) from the coast at Jokulsa River. Historically the eastern part of the Fellsjökull glacier was assigned to an area now assigned to the Breiðamerkurjökull outlet glacier. Since 1890, Breiðamerkurjökull has been retreating, to a total of 5.6 km (3.5 mi) during the 20th century. With temperatures rising between 1920 and 1965, changes started occurring in the Breiðamerkurjökull glacier tongue. In 1933 or 1934 a proglacial lake or lagoon formed in the depression left where the retreating glacier had been. Since then, the lake, which is named Jökulsárlón, has grown larger as the glacier continues its retreat. In 1975, Jökulsárlón had an area of about 8 km^{2} (3.1 mi^{2}); by 1998 its area was almost 15 km^{2} (5.8 mi^{2}); and by 2004 it had grown to 17.5 km^{2} (6.8 mi^{2}). By 2010 the lake was about 200 metres (660 ft) deep where the glacier snout was previously. Glacial moraines are exposed on both sides of the water. The tongue of the glacier floats in the lake and is calving into the water, producing floating icebergs of varying size.

== Ice streams ==
There are three named ice streams, originating in the ice dome and separated partially by nunataks and these are from the south Esjufjallajökull, Mávabyggðajökull and the largest Norðlingalæðarjökull. Norðlingalæðarjökull has at its northern border a large nunatak named Vesturbjörg currently separated by a mid ice cap lake called Esjufjallalón from an adjacent to the east nunatak named Skálabjörg.

== Monitoring ==
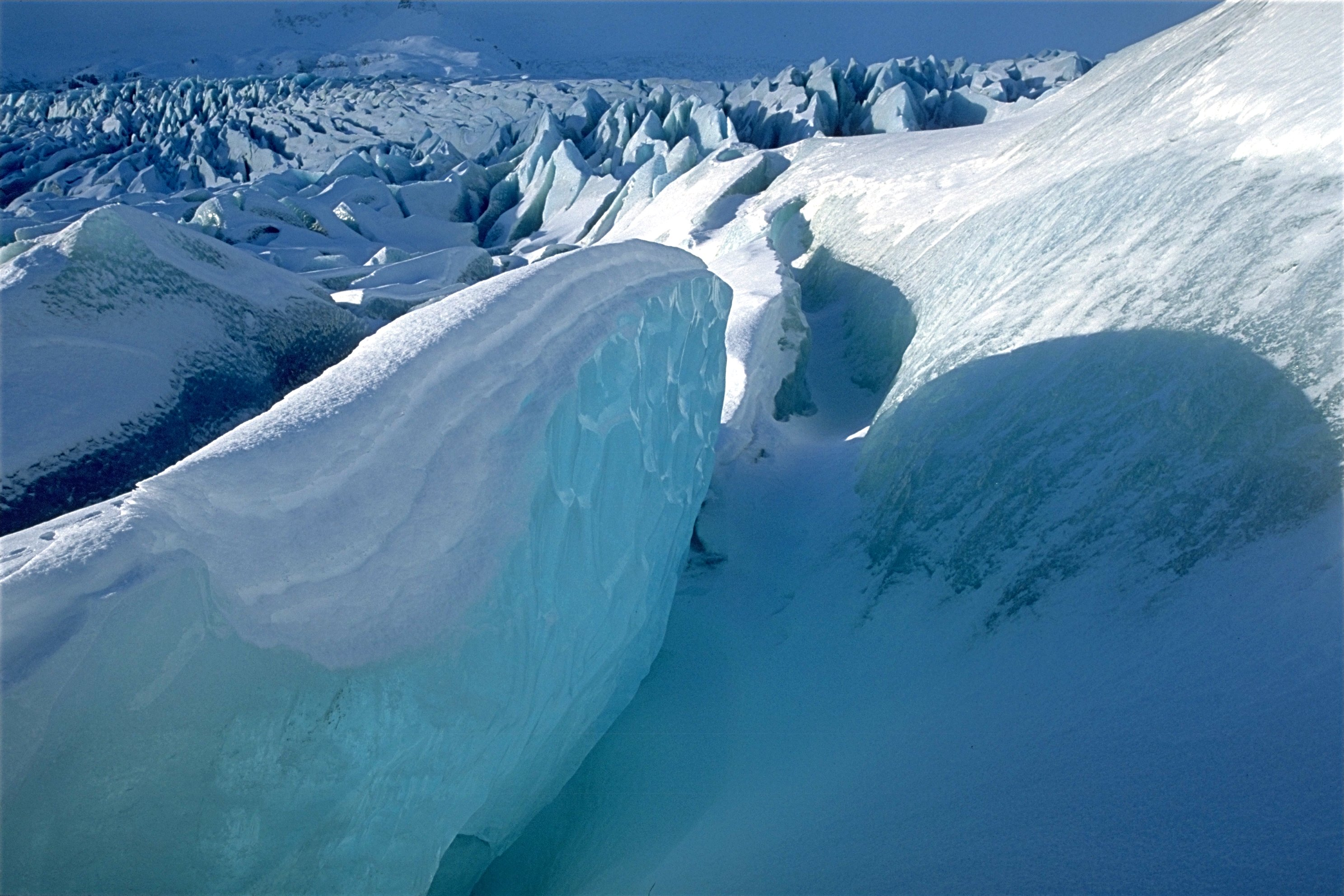
Vatnajökull Glacier from where Breiðamerkurjökull has emerged

The complex nature of glacial advance or retreat has been monitored in the last several decades. A study by D. Evans, published in Geography Review in 2002, reported on monitoring of the Breiðamerkurjökull between 1903 and 1998. The Breiðamerkurjökull east lobe and central lobe retreated at a slower average rate (28 m (92 ft) per year) between 1980 and 1998 than in earlier periods when retreat rates were as high as 50 m (160 ft) per year for the east lobe and 67 m (220 ft) per year for the central lobe. Retreat of the Breiðamerkurjökull west lobe was more uniform, averaging about 30 m (98 ft) per year, except in the period from 1945–65 when the rate of retreat averaged 62.5 m (205 ft) per year.

According to another study, a scarp capped by the Breiðamerkurjökull lobe of the larger Vatnajökull glacier was formed into terraces and barriers, enclosed by lagoons, on the east coast. On the northern side the Jökulsá river or lagoon emanating from the Breiðamerkurjökull, has its outlet to the sea and it has formed sand gravel barriers and the glacier front has retreated by 3 km (1.9 mi) in the period from 1945, 1965 and 1998.

== Tourism ==
The tongue of the Breiðamerkurjökull glacier is a major attraction for tourists. Tour operators conduct snowmobiles and jeep tours to visit the glacier along the winding iceberg studded Jökulsárlón lagoon. The base station for visits to the area is at Jöklasel [ˈjœhklaˌsɛːl̥], which is approached from Höfn. It is termed as Tourist Conveyor belt. While walking on the shore, the isolated big blocks of icebergs on the sand beaches can be seen.

On 25 August 2024, a group of tourists were caught in the collapse of an ice wall in a ravine outside of an ice cave, leaving one dead and one severely injured. The accident sparked a discussion on the potential dangers of ice cave tourism in the country, including within the Icelandic Government.

== See also ==
- Retreat of glaciers since 1850
