= Jökulsárlón =

Glacial lake in Iceland

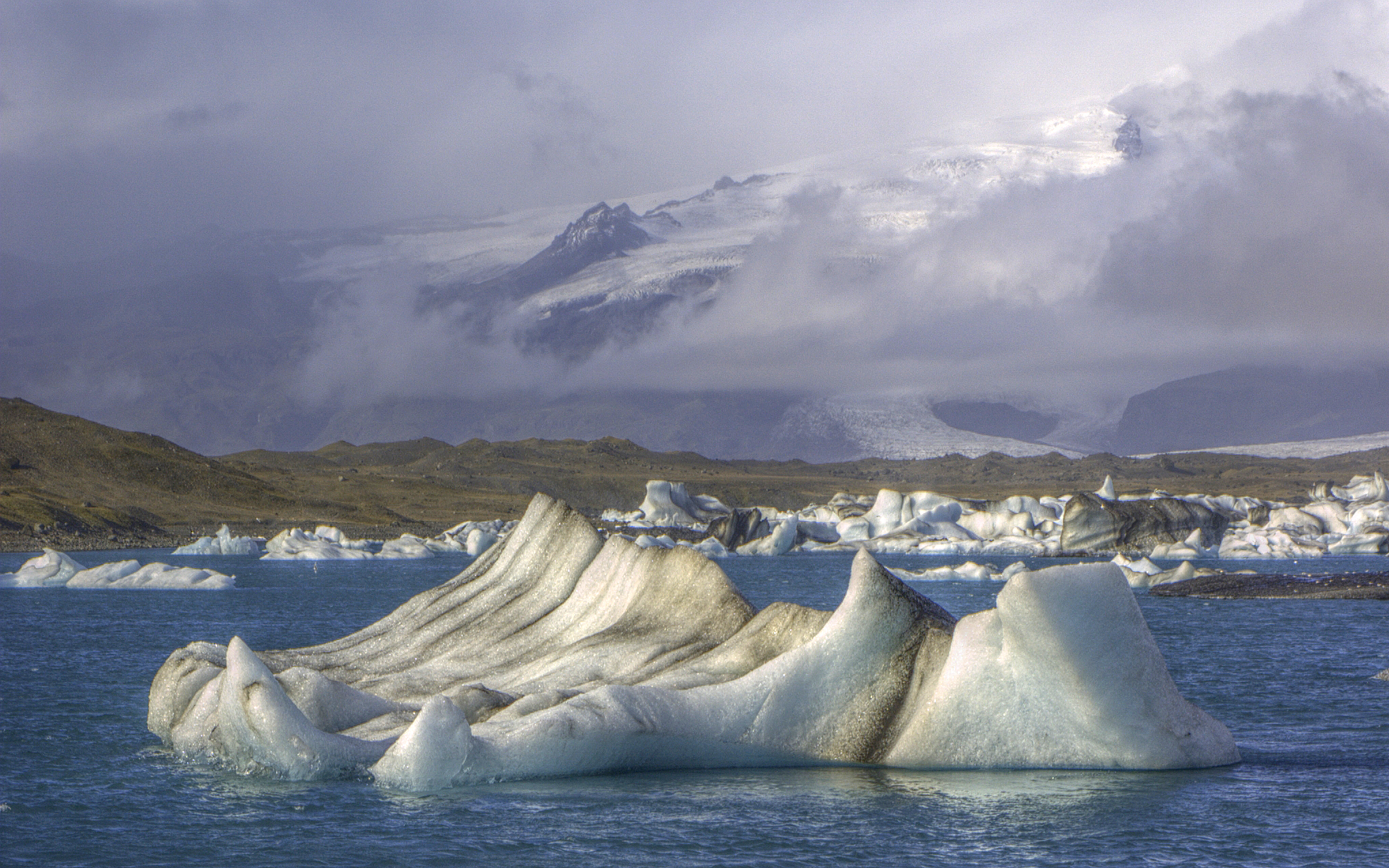

- Location within Iceland
- Coordinates: 64°04′13″N 16°12′42″W
- Type: Glacial
- Primary inflows: Breiðamerkurjökull glacier
- Primary outflows: Atlantic Ocean
- Basin countries: Iceland
- Max. length: 8 km (5.0 mi)
- Surface area: 25 km^{2} (9.7 mi^{2})
- Average depth: ca. 153 m (502 ft)
- Max. depth: 284 metres (932 ft)
- Water volume: 2,500–3,000 hm^{3}/s (0.60–0.72 cu mi/s)
- Surface elevation: 0 m (0 ft), sea level

Jökulsárlón (Icelandic pronunciation: [ˈjœːkʏlsˌaurˌlouːn]; translates to "glacial river lagoon") is a large glacial lake in the southern part of Vatnajökull National Park, Iceland. Situated at the head of the Breiðamerkurjökull glacier, it developed into a lake after the glacier started receding in the late 19th century. The lake has grown since then at varying rates because of the melting of the glaciers. The glacial front is now about 8 km (5.0 mi) away from the ocean's edge, and the lake covers an area of about 25 km^{2} (9.7 mi^{2}). In 2009 it was reported to be the deepest lake in Iceland, at over 284 m (932 ft), as glacial retreat extended its boundaries. The size of the lake has increased fourfold since the 1970s.

The lake can be seen from Route 1 between Höfn and Skaftafell. It appears as "a ghostly procession of luminous blue icebergs".

Jökulsárlón has been a setting for four Hollywood movies: A View to a Kill, Die Another Day, Lara Croft: Tomb Raider, and Batman Begins, as well as the reality TV series The Amazing Race. In 1991, Iceland issued a postage stamp, with a face value of 26 kronur, depicting Jökulsárlón.

The tongue of the Breiðamerkurjökull glacier is a major attraction for tourists.

== Formation ==
=== Lagoon ===
Jökulsárlón is the largest and most active glacial lake in Iceland. It provides outstanding views of the ice cap Vatnajökull, a vast dome of ice that rises to a height of 900 m (3,000 ft) and shows how the outlet glacier Breiðamerkurjökull calves into the lagoon.

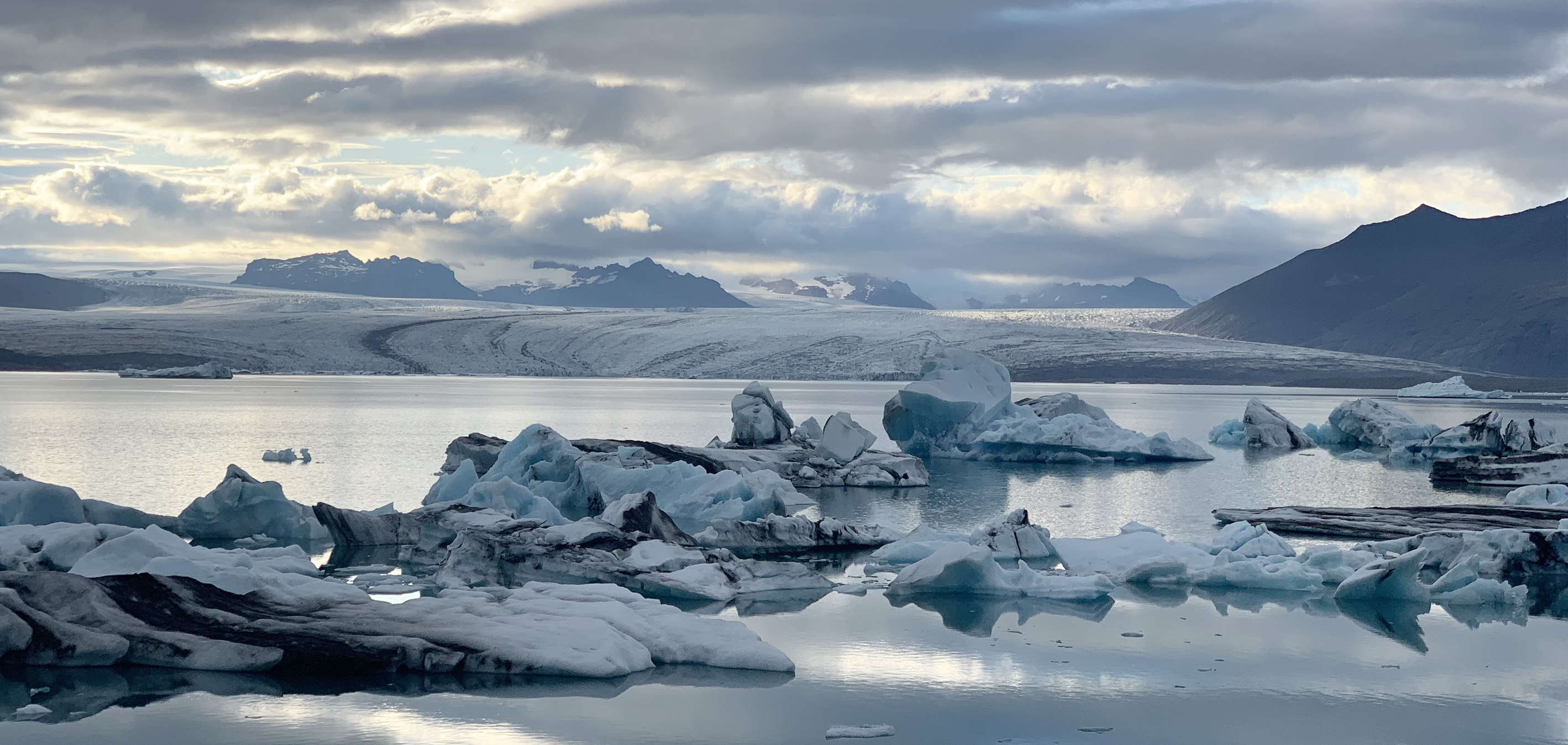
Ice lagoon Jökulsárlón at the foot of the Vatnajökull Glacier, 2023

The lagoon started to form in the 1930s after the glacier Breiðamerkurjökull started to recede in the late 19th century, and it is getting bigger because the glacier is receding about 200m every year. Icebergs gather at the mouth of the lake's shallow exit, melt down into smaller ice blocks, and roll out into the sea. Ice water and soil make a unique ecological phenomenon. Jökulsárlón Lake, the "glacier lake", was reported to have doubled in size in the 15 years before 2007. The huge blocks of ice that calve from the edge of Vatnajökull are about 30 m (98 ft) high, which fill the lagoon stocked with icebergs. Some icebergs appear naturally sculpted on account of volcanic ash from ancient eruptions that partly covers them.

==== Icebergs ====
The icebergs that calve from the glacier edge move towards the river mouth and get entrenched at the bottom. The movement of the icebergs fluctuates with the tide currents, as well as being affected by wind. However, they start floating as icebergs when their size is small enough to drift to the sea. These icebergs are seen in two shades: milky white and bright blue, which depends on the air trapped within the ice and is an interplay of light and ice crystals.

=== Glacier - Breiðamerkurjökull ===
The outlet glacier that feeds the lagoon is called Breiðamerkurjökull.

=== Outwash plains - Breiðamerkursandur ===
The glacier is responsible for the formation of a large outwash plain called Breiðamerkursandur. It has a breadth of around 25 km and serves as bird habitat in the summer months. This outwash plain is constantly changing. The shoreline of the glacial lagoon used to be advancing, but is now retreating as there is a decrease in glacial rivers depositing material. However, as the glaciers melt, the land rises around 2–4 cm each year, somewhat balancing out the retreating shoreline.

== Fauna ==
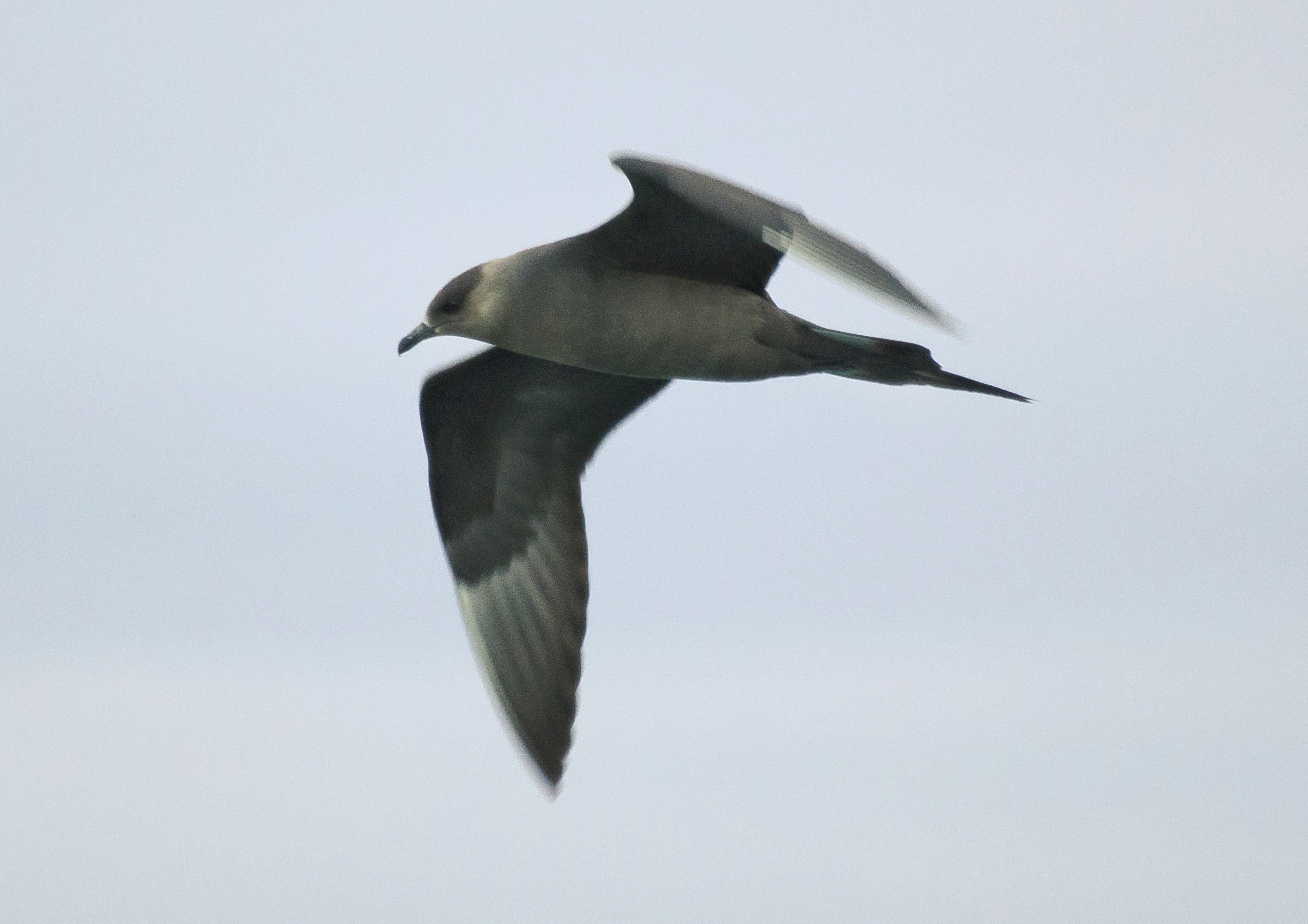
Arctic skua (Stercorarius parasiticus)

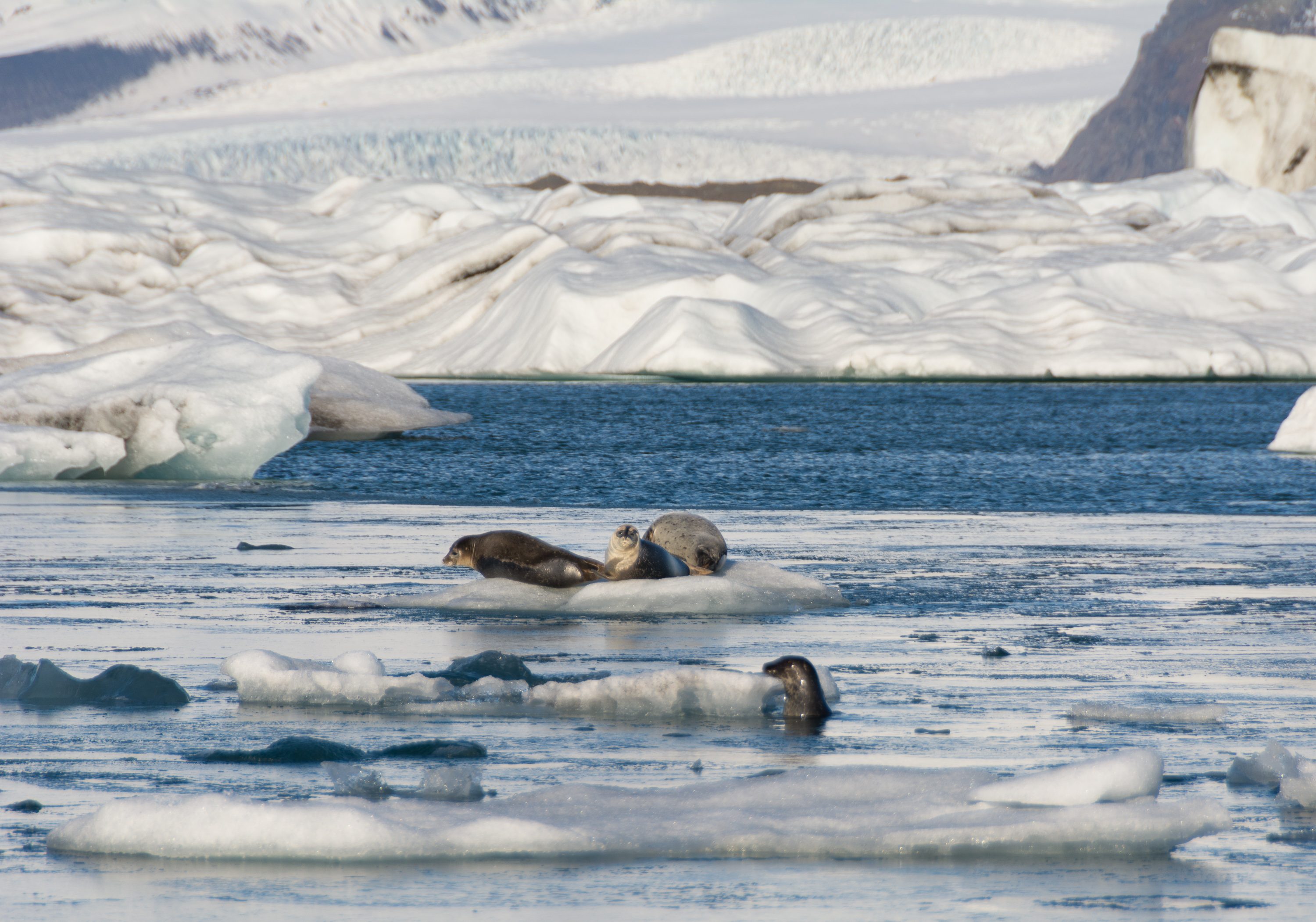
Common seals on the Jökulsárlón lake

The lake is filled with fish that drift in from the sea along with the tides. Seals gather in large numbers at the mouth of the lake to catch fish during the winter. Large numbers of seabirds, particularly Arctic terns, which nest nearby, gather to catch herring, trout, salmon, krill and other fish. Breiðamerkursandur (the large sand deposits in the area) is the main habitat of the Arctic skua (Stercorarius parasiticus). During the summer season, the gull-like skuas have their nests on the lake's shores. The skuas, fat and dark in colour with white wingtips, are said to be aggressive "pirates of the seas", which harass other birds as big as gannets. They also kill and eat smaller birds such as puffins. Great skuas are not afraid of human beings and also do not tolerate human beings close to their nests. These birds are reported to migrate from their wintering grounds off the coasts of Spain and Africa. Seals are seen either swimming in the lagoon or lying on icebergs. Many times, the tides carry shoals of herring or capelin into the lagoon, and the birds feast on them.

== Land Use History ==
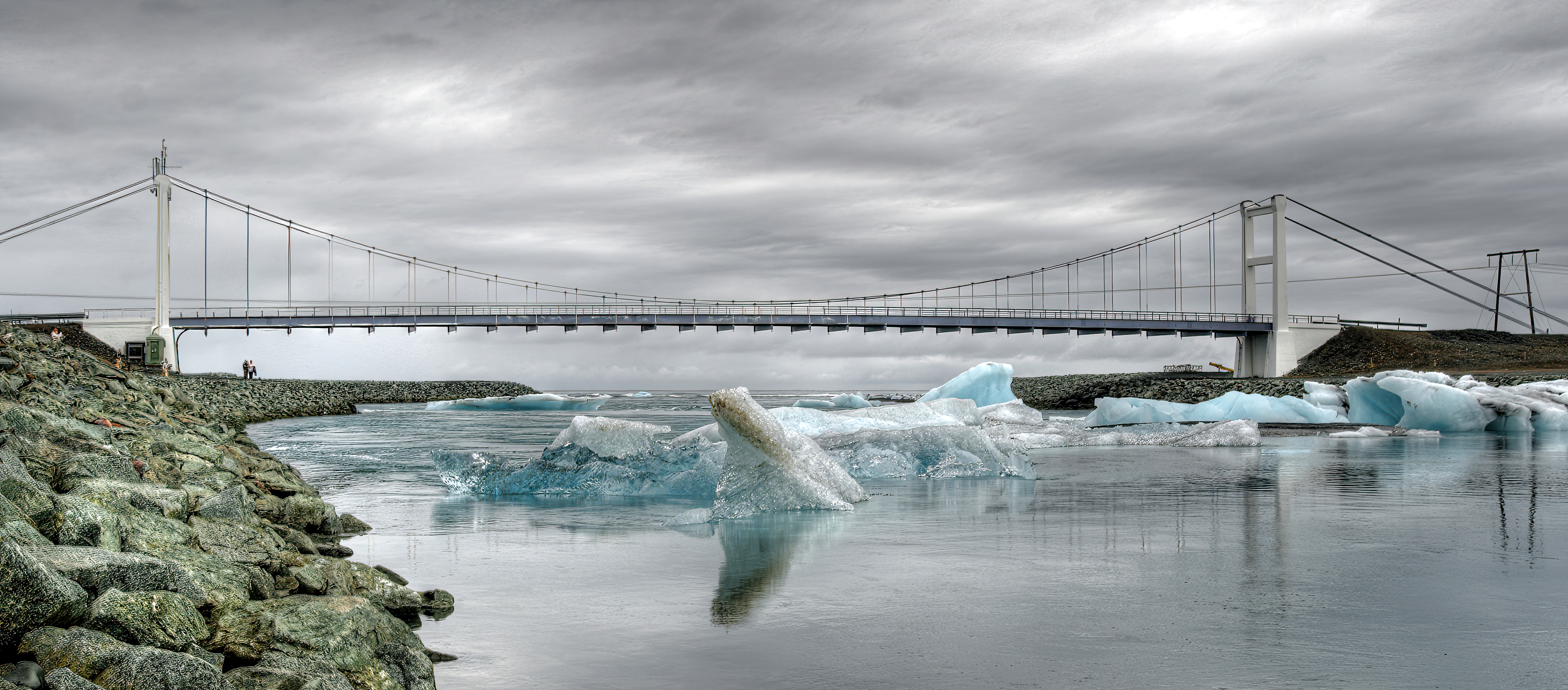
Bridge across the lagoon

=== Land Settlement and Farms ===
The first settlers arrived in Iceland around AD 870, when the edge of the tongue of Breiðamerkurjökull glacier was about 20 km (12 mi) further north of its present location. During the Little Ice Age between 1600 and 1900, with lower temperatures prevailing in these latitudes, the glacier had grown by up to about 1 km (0.62 mi) from the coast at the Jokulsá River by about 1890. When the temperatures rose between 1920 and 1965, the Breiðamerkurjökull glacier tongue rapidly retreated, continually creating icebergs of varying size, thus creating a lagoon in its wake around 1934–35. The lake is over 200 m (660 ft) deep where the glacier snout originally existed. Glacial moraines became exposed on both sides of the lake. In 1975, the lake was about 8 km^{2} (3.1 mi^{2}) in area and now it reportedly stands at 25 km^{2} (9.7 mi^{2}) at the edge of the glacier tongue.

=== Current Ownership ===
In 2017 the Icelandic State bought the farm Fell which includes Jökulsárlón. Later that same year Fell and other public land surrounding Jökulsárlón got protected as a part of Vatnajökull National Park.

The Jökulsárlón Landowners Association represented the owners of the land property Fell. This property was leased out for filming or any other commercial activity as required.

Einar Björn Einarsson is the operator of the boat trips on Jökulsárlón. The Landowners Association leased out the site at the lagoon front to this operator to ply the boats on the lagoon.

=== Nature Protection ===
Jökulsárlón and the surrounding area are a part of Vatnajökull National Park. The size of the park is 14,967 km^{2} Which is approximately 14% of Iceland, making it Europe's second-largest national park in terms of area after Yugyd Va in Russia. On 5 July 2019, Vatnajökull National Park was inscribed as a UNESCO World Heritage Site. The unique qualities of Vatnajökull National Park are primarily its great variety of landscape features, created by the combined forces of rivers, glacial ice, and volcanic and geothermal activity. The National Park aims to preserve unimpaired the natural beauty of the park for the enjoyment, education, and inspiration of this and future generations.

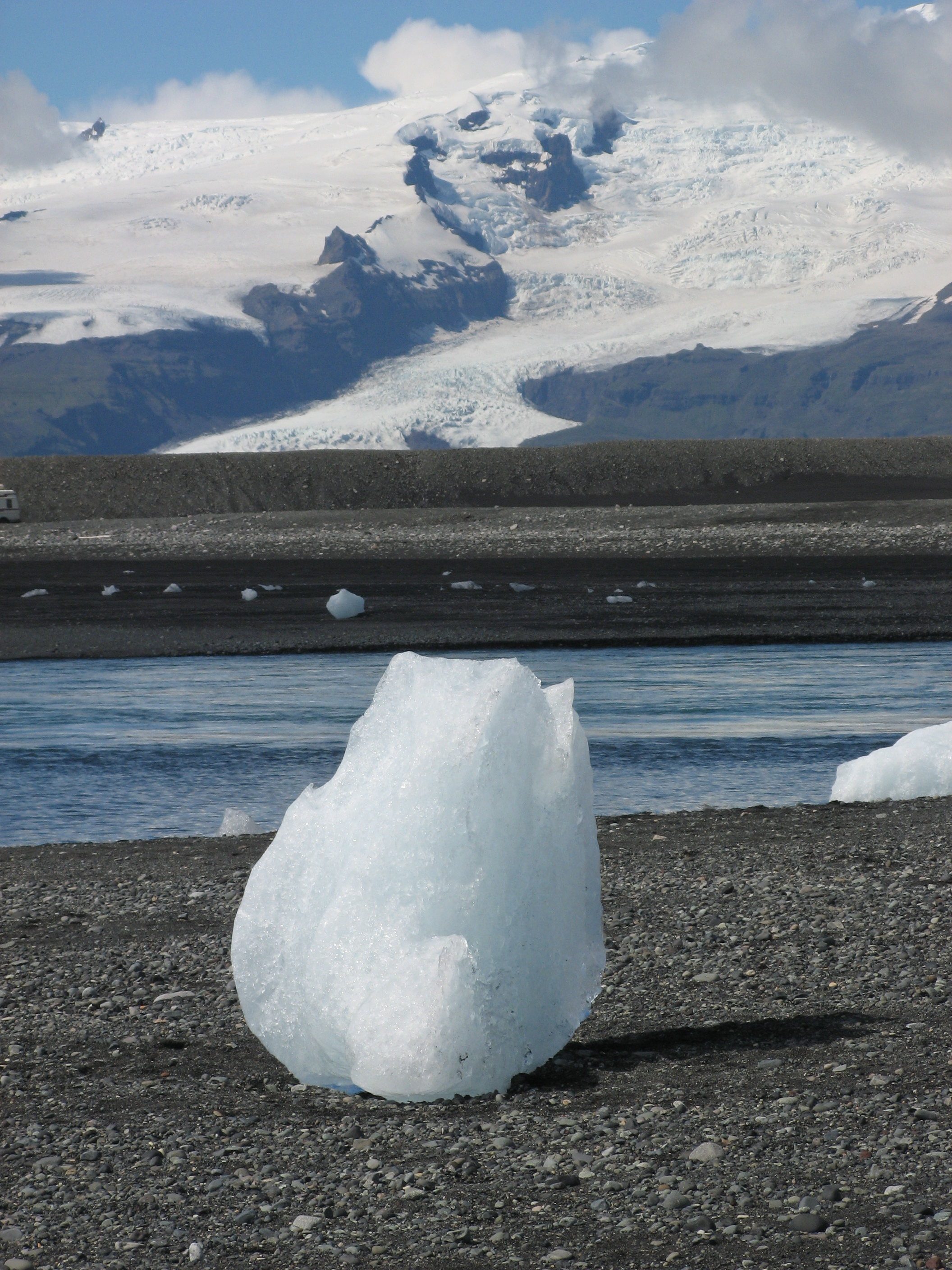
An iceberg with Öræfajökull (southernmost part of Vatnajökull) in the background: The icebergs in Jökulsárlón, as well as this iceberg, fell off Vatnajökull.

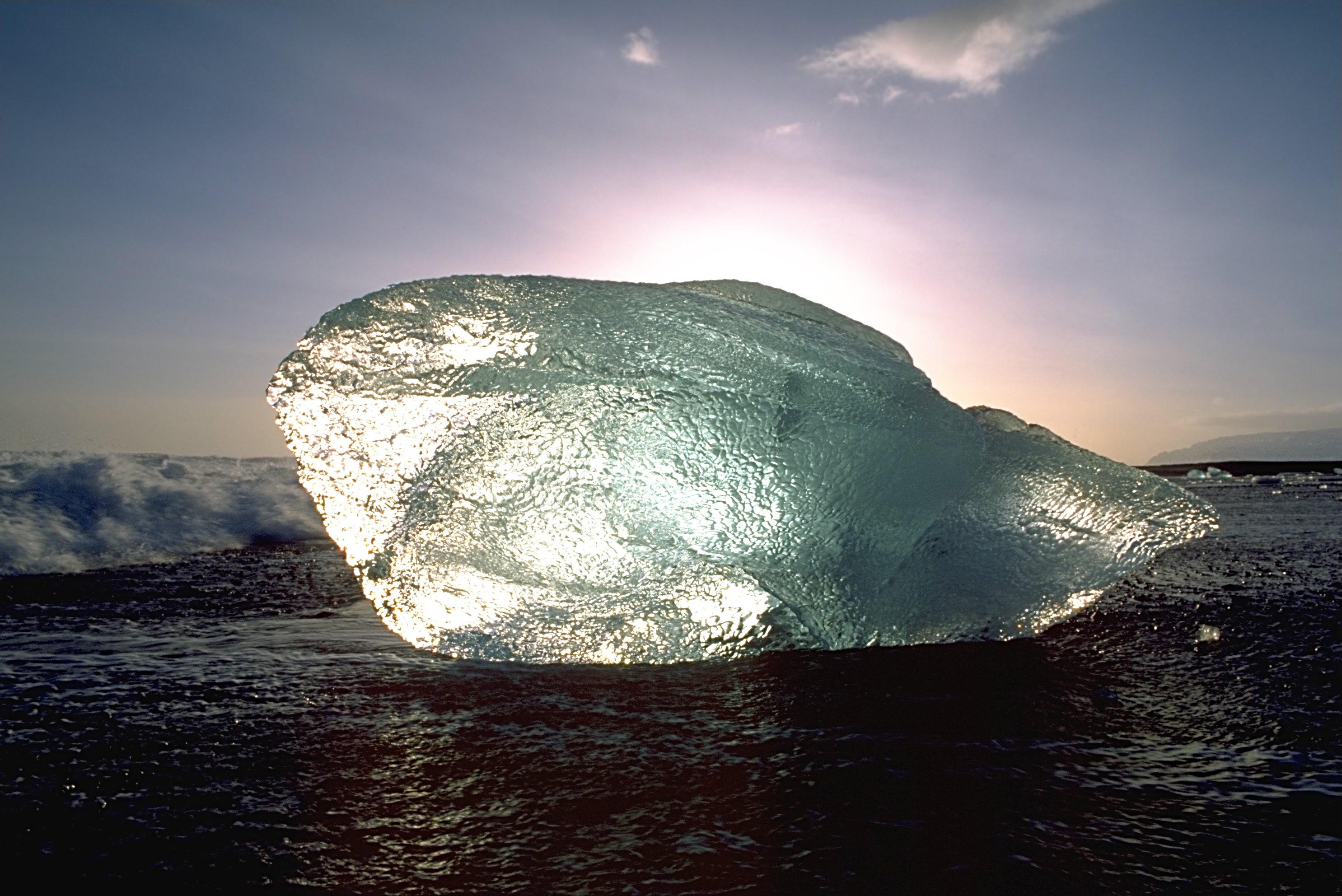
An isolated mini-iceberg on "Diamond Beach"

=== Protective measures for the bridge ===
A coffer dam was constructed near the Glacial River Bridge that spans Jökulsárlón to build a row of protective measures of stone boulders to prevent any erosion of the foundation of the pillars of the bridge. This coffer dam enabled the Icelandic road administration to create workable access for the power shovel digger to place the row of stone protective measures, which would also divert the icebergs from hitting the bridge pillars, thus avoiding damage to the structure.

Given the current retreat rate of Vatnajökull, a deep fjord will likely develop where Jökulsárlón is now. This retreat is also posing a threat to the National Highway Route 1 of Iceland. The lagoon is 75 km (47 mi) to the west of Höfn town and 60 km (37 mi) east of Skaftafell. It is accessible by the ring road, Route 1, that goes across the lake, and where parking facilities have been provided for visitors. It is also known as the "tourist conveyor belt". Isolated large blocks of icebergs can be seen on the black sand beach, sometimes called "diamond beach" because of ice chunks scattered on the sand. The name of the beach is actually Eystri-Fellsfjara.

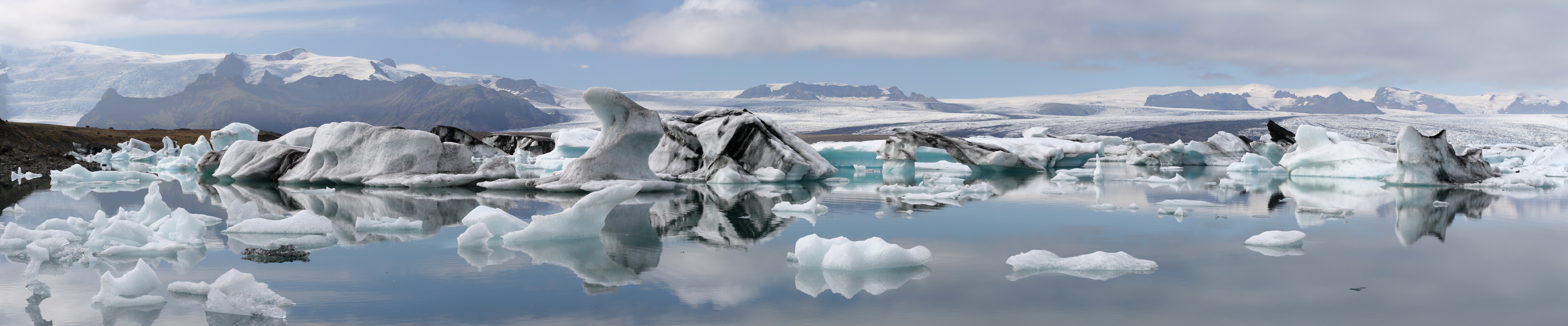
Panorama of Jökulsárlón.

== Tourism and Services ==
=== Activities ===
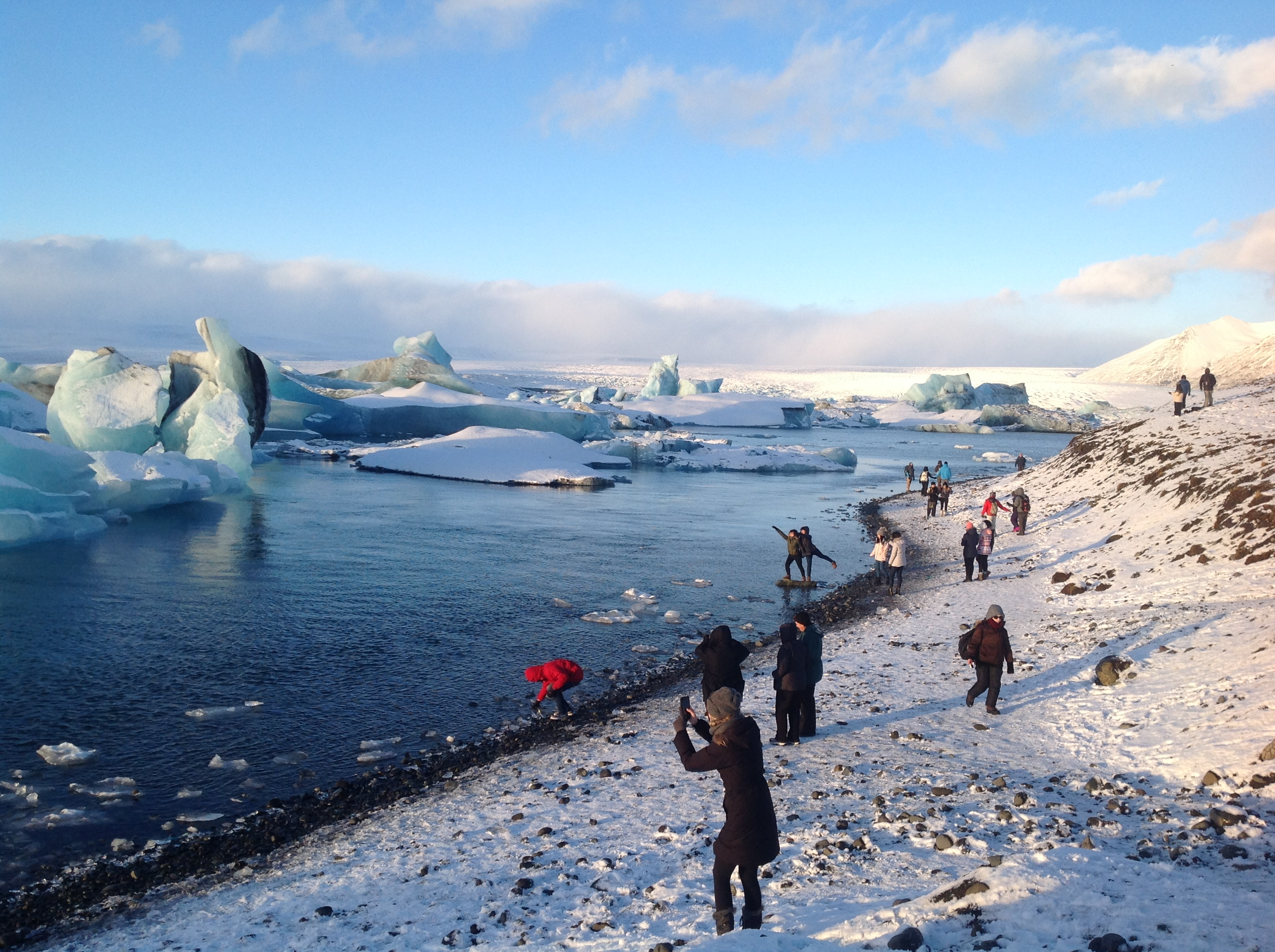
Tourists at Jökulsárlón in January 2017.

There are many activities available to guests at Jökulsárlón. There are lagoon tours provided by several different companies in boats or kayaks. In the winter, there are ice cave tours that leave from the lagoon parking lot. There are hiking trails around the area that offer guests an opportunity to explore the area.

==== Boat tours on the glacier lake ====
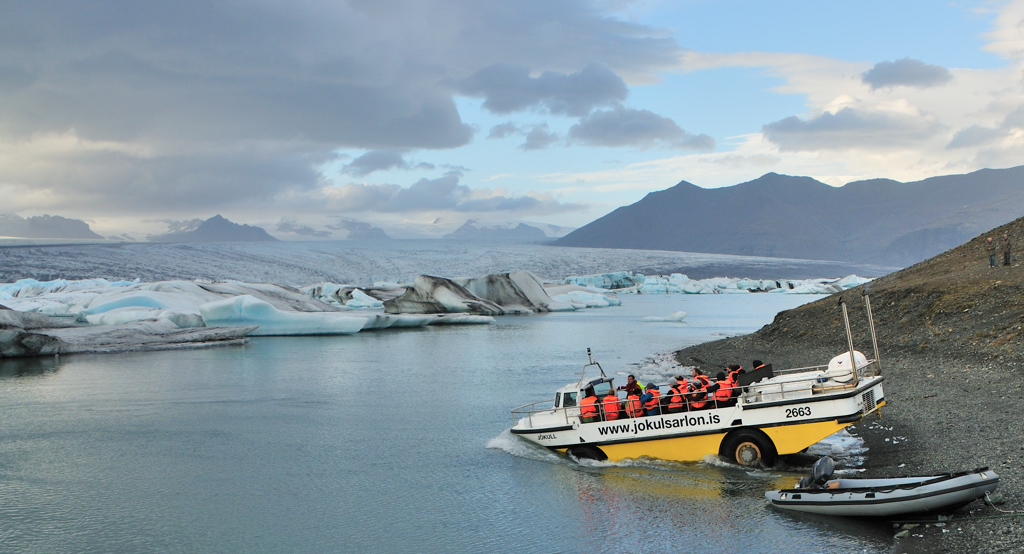
Amphibious boat tour at Jökulsárlón, 2008

In 1985, the premiere of the James Bond movie A View to a Kill marked the start of commercial boat tours on the lake. Guðbrandur Jóhannesson started the tours on Jökulsárlón. Jóhannesson, who today owns and operates the company Vatnajökull Travel, operated the tours for the first two years. In summer 1987, about 5,000 passengers sailed on the company's two small vessels. The next year, an amphibious vehicle, the LARC-V, joined the fleet. By 1995, the number of passengers per year had multiplied, and the company then operated three amphibious vehicles. In 1999, Einar Björn Einarsson, a local from the nearby town of Höfn, bought the company. In 2006, the company added a fourth amphibious vehicle.

The company Jökulsárlón ehf now employs about 30 seasonal employees. For the past few years, the company has carried 60,000 to 70,000 passengers annually; since the first commercial boat tour, about 900,000 tourists have taken the excursion.

=== Services ===
There are park rangers working in the area all year round. During the summer months, park rangers offer free educational walks for park visitors.

== In popular culture ==
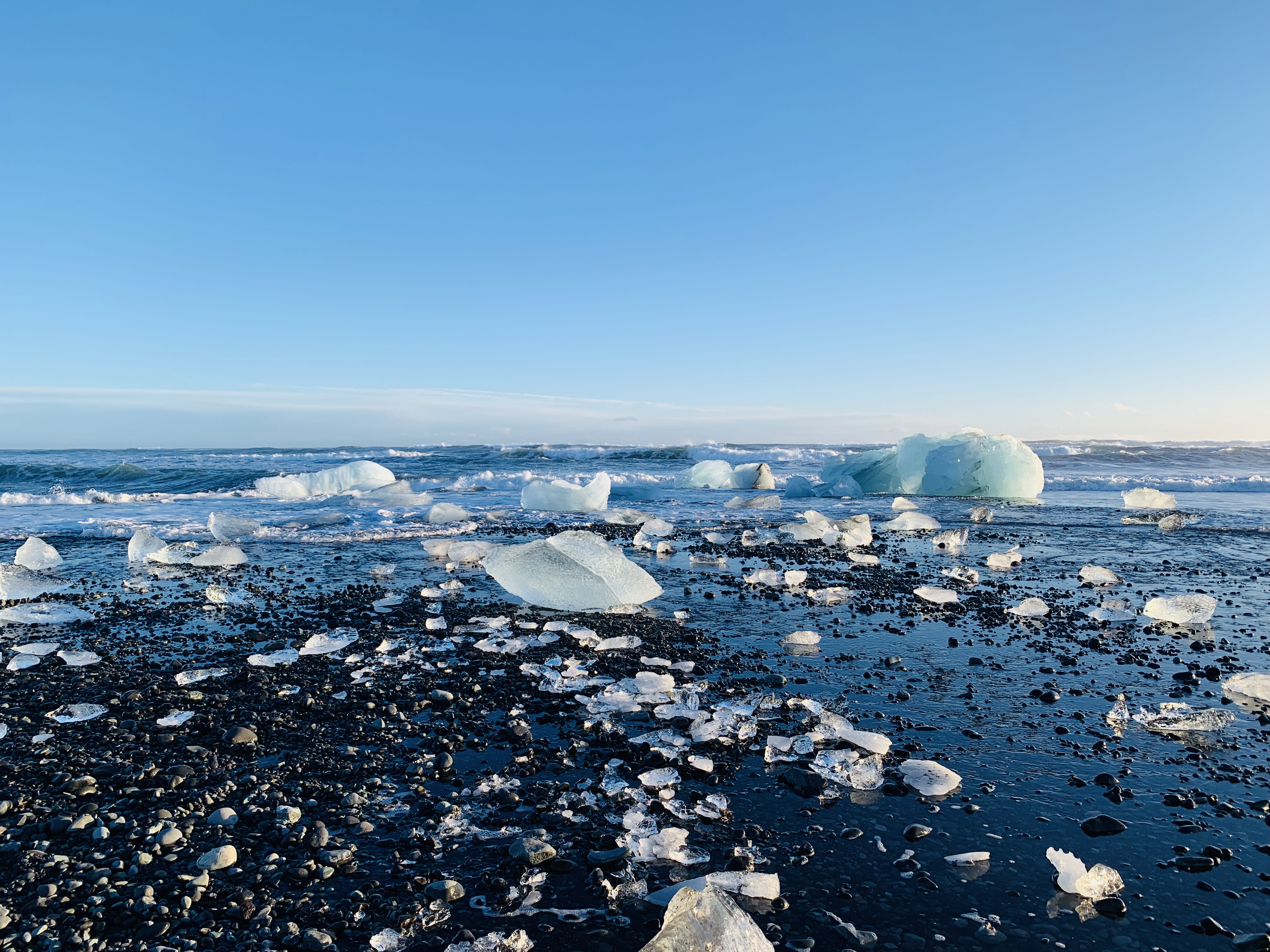
Jökulsárlón's "Diamond Beach"

Jökulsárlón and the Breiðamerkurjökull glacier have been part of the James Bond films A View to a Kill (1985) and Die Another Day (2002), Batman Begins (2005), Beowulf and Grendel (2005), Lara Croft: Tomb Raider (2001) and Dilwale.

The popularity of the lake has been further boosted by the TV coverage provided live from Jökulsárlón on the American TV program Good Morning America in southeast Iceland, on 13 November 2006. The live broadcast is reported to have been watched by four million people.

In 2014, Swedish electronic multimedia project iamamiwhoami filmed their music video "vista" in Jökulsárlón.

In October 2014, scenes of French singer Indila's music video "Love Story" were filmed at the lagoon.

== See also ==
- List of lakes of Iceland
- Vatnajökull
