= Skaftafell =

Protected area in Iceland

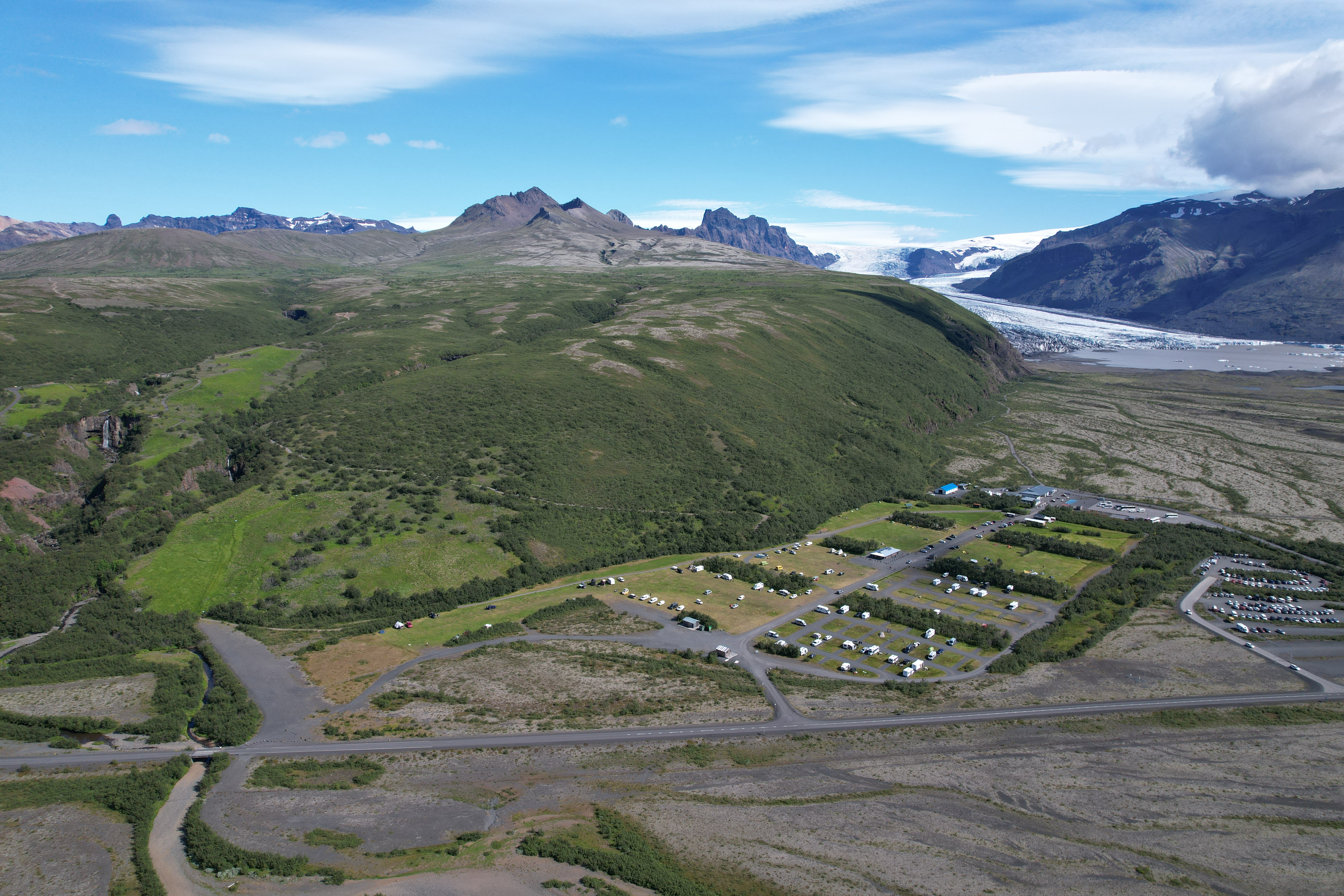
- Aerial view of the campsite with Skaftafellsjökull in the background
- Interactive map of Skaftafell
- Location: Southern Iceland
- Coordinates: 64°00′58″N 16°58′19″W
- Area: 4,807 km^{2} (1,856 sq mi)
- Established: September 15, 1967

Skaftafell (Icelandic: [ˈskaftaˌfɛtl̥]) is a preservation area in Öræfi, southeast Iceland. It was once a major farm, later being named a national park. Originally known as Skaftafell National Park, it was subsequently joined together with other nearby regions to form the larger Vatnajökull National Park.

== Skaftafell National Park ==
Skaftafell National Park was a national park between Kirkjubæjarklaustur, typically referred to as Klaustur, and Höfn in the south of Iceland. On 7 June 2008, it became a part of the larger Vatnajökull National Park.

It was founded on September 15, 1967, and enlarged twice afterwards. Before its inclusion into Vatnajökull National Park, it measured about 4807 km^{2} (2884 mi^{2}), making it Iceland's second largest national park. It contains the valley Morsárdalur [ˈmɔr̥sˌaurˌtaːlʏr̥], the mountain Kristínartindar [ˈkʰrɪstiːnarˌˈtʰɪntar̥] and the glacier Skaftafellsjökull [ˈskaftaˌfɛlsˌjœːkʏtl̥] (a spur of the Vatnajökull ice cap).

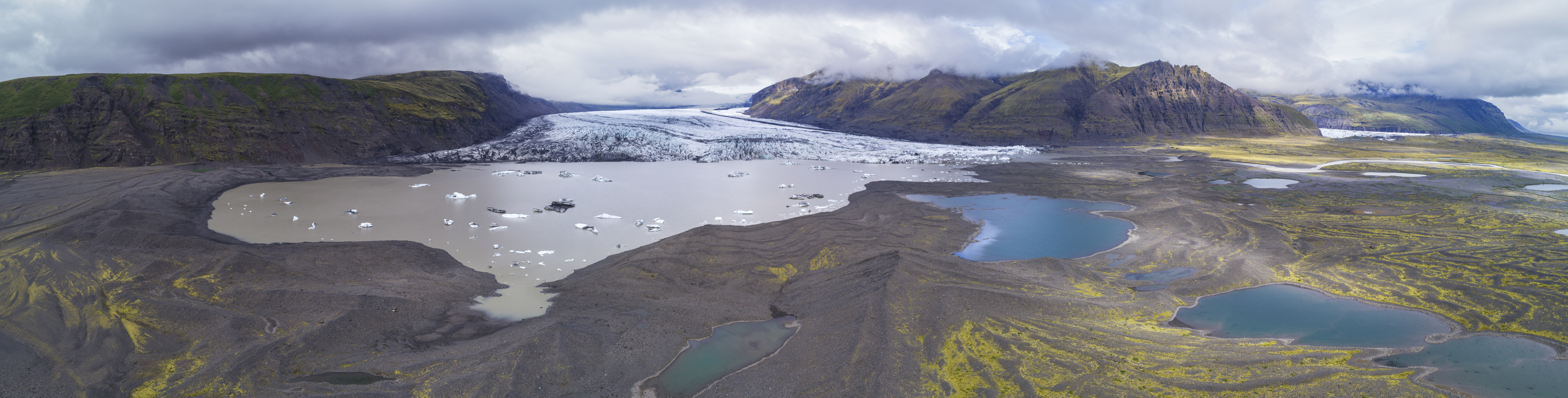
Skaftafellsjökull glacier as seen from the sky

The landscape is very similar to some of the Alps. Still, it has been formed over thousands of years by different influences of fire (volcanic eruptions of Öræfajökull) and water (the glaciers Skeiðarárjökull [ˈsceiːðarˌaurˌjœːkʏtl̥] and Skaftafellsjökull), the rivers Skeiðará, Morsá [ˈmɔr̥sˌauː] und Skaftafellsá [ˈskaftaˌfɛlsˌauː]. Volcanic eruptions under the ice cap can give rise to jökulhlaups (glacial floods) which swell the Skeiðará River massively. The sandy wasteland between the glacier and the sea caused by jökulhlaups is called Skeiðarársandur and is a typical outwash plain known locally as a sandur [ˈsantʏr̥]. The last large jökulhlaup occurred in 1996.

Skaftafell is renowned in Iceland for its agreeable climate and the sunny days in summer, uncommon in the south of Iceland. There is a natural birch wood, Bæjarstaðarskógur [ˈpaiːjarˌstaːðarˌskouː(ɣ)ʏr̥], as well as many species of birds and Arctic foxes.

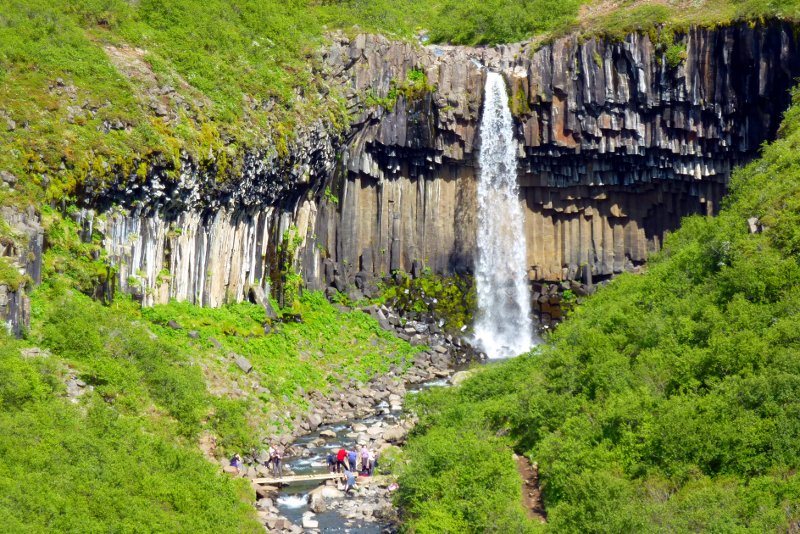
Svartifoss waterfall is one of Skaftafell's best known attractions, mainly for the basalt column walls that flank it.

The waterfall Svartifoss (Black Fall) flows over a step of about 20 metres. Its name comes from the black basalt columns behind it. In the Middle Ages there were a number of large farms in this area, but they were abandoned after two volcanic eruptions and the ensuing glacier runs. The two surviving farms now mostly make a living from tourism. The park has also an information centre and a campground. There are many hiking trails crossing the area.

Nearby hamlets include Kirkjubæjarklaustur, Svínafell [ˈsviːnaˌfɛtl̥], Hof, and Kálfafell.

== History of habitation ==
Soon after Iceland was settled, Skaftafell became a major farm, and area meetings (þing [ˈθiŋk]) were held on its land. The disastrous Öræfajökull eruption of 1362 wiped out the entire local community and the district has been named Öræfi, the "wasteland", ever since. Skaftafell and many other farms were soon re-established, but at that time the climate was also starting to cool down, making it increasingly difficult to live from farming. The frequent Grímsvötn eruptions triggered jökulhlaups which flooded over hayfields, covering them with ash and sand. In 1988, traditional farming was discontinued at Skaftafell.

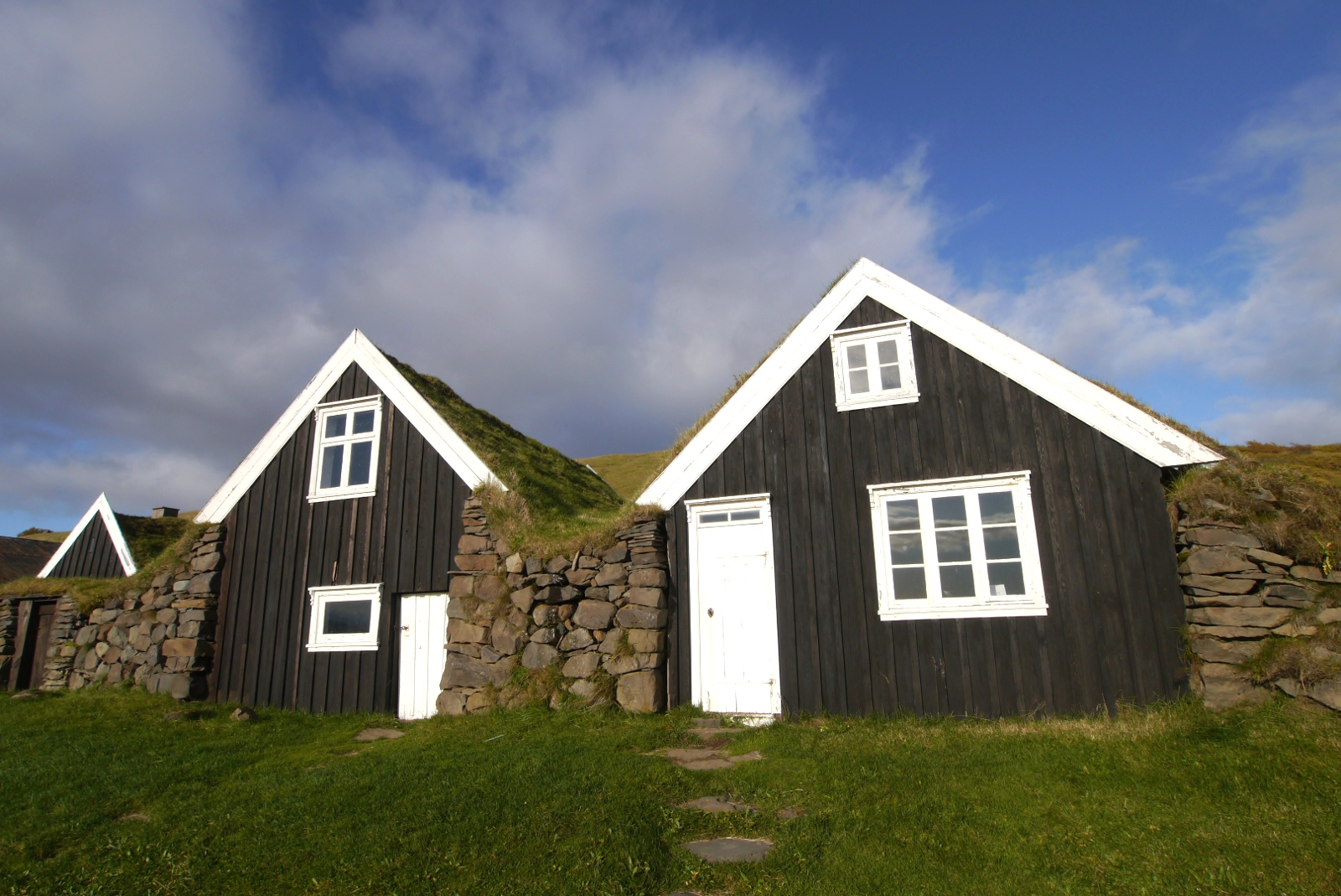
The old farmhouse in Sel.

In earlier times, however, the farmers had supplemented sheep farming by trips to the coast, where they hunted seals and collected eggs. Stranded ships provided excellent material for making various items, and some of the Skaftafell farmers became well known for their crafting talents.

In earlier centuries, the farmstead stood just below the slopes, where some of the ruins still remain visible at Gömlutún [ˈkœmlʏˌtʰuːn]. Skeiðará river began flowing closer to the farm and destroyed the fields, until in the early 19th century when the farm was moved onto the mountain slopes and divided into three households. One of them, Sel [ˈsɛːl̥], was abandoned in 1946 but has since been restored by the National Museum and made accessible for visitors.

== Landscape and geology ==
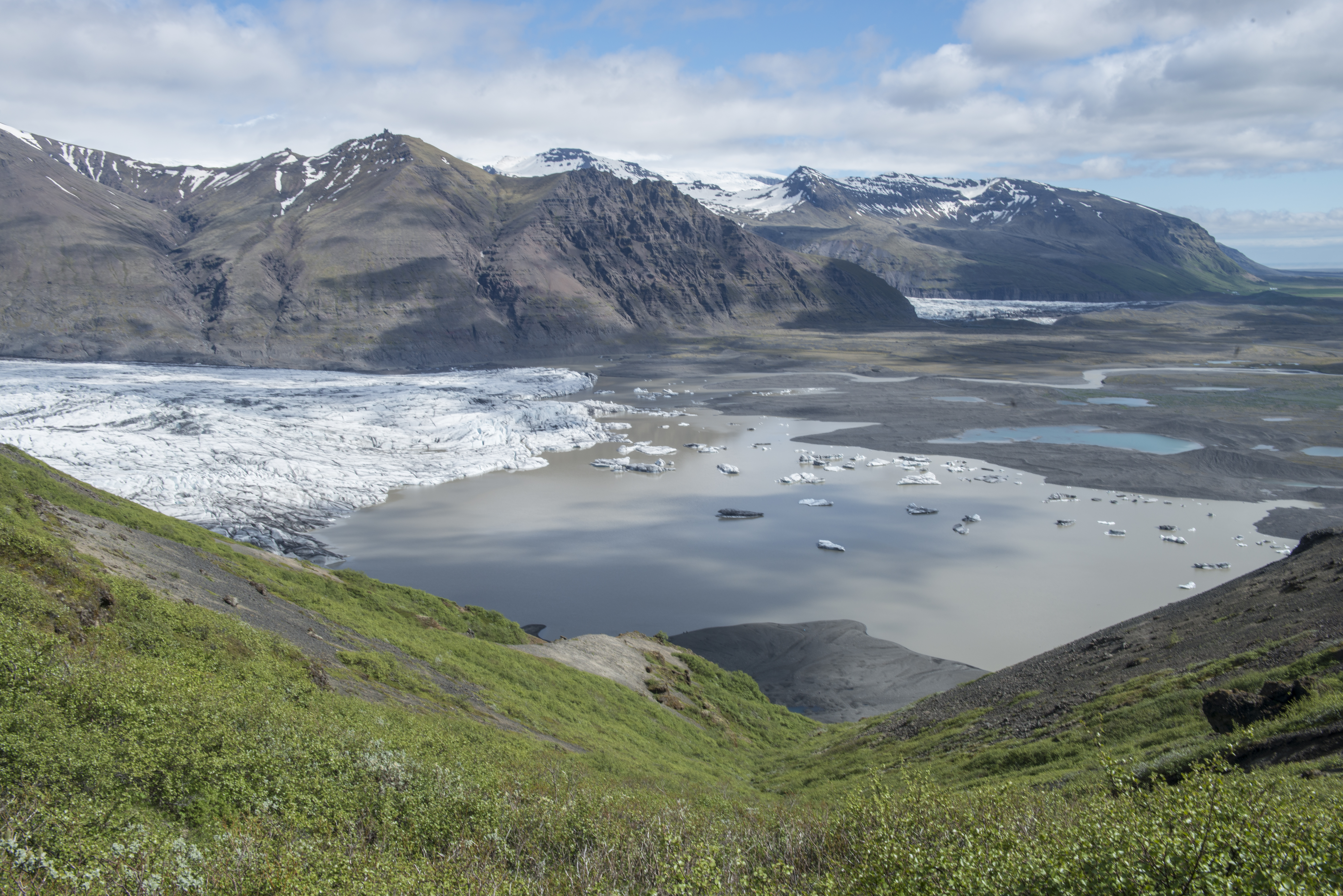
A view from the S2 hike in Skaftafell

The scenery around Skaftafell is full of stark contrasts. The various glacial tongues are flanked by jagged mountains, with the glacier-topped peak of Hvannadalshnjúkur rising highest. Evidence abounds of the erosive forces exerted by glacial ice and rivers. From the time of the first sagas, this ice has variously advanced or retreated, reaching farthest around 1890, since when it has retreated.

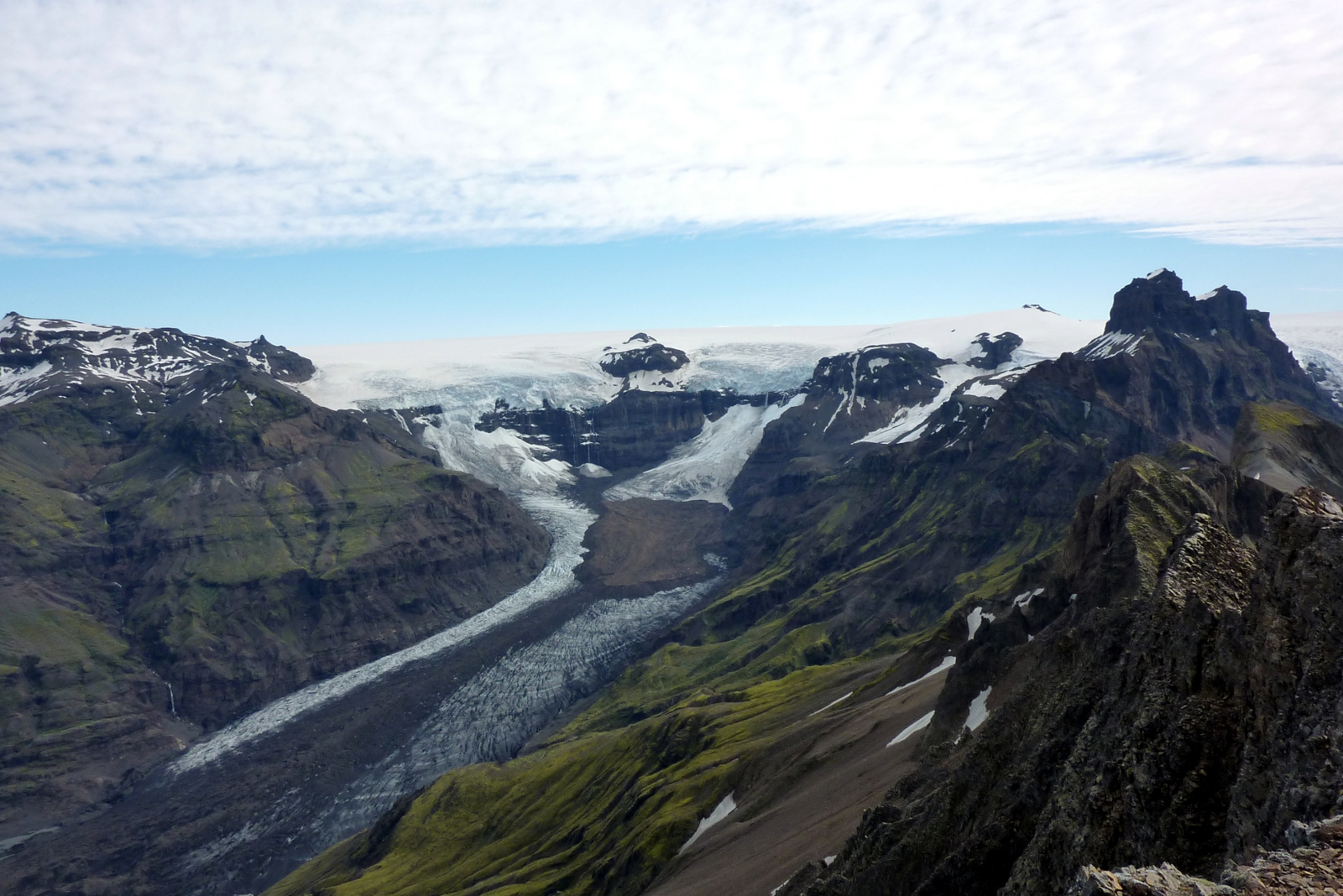
View from Kristínartindar mountain peaks towards Morsárjökull glacier.

The rivers running from it have flowed back and forth over the lowlands, depositing the material that forms the wide sands of Skeiðarársandur. Road No. 1 did not become a complete circle around the country until 1974, when the last of the rivers barring transportation, the Skeiðará, was finally bridged. Even so, in 2009 Skeiðará stopped flowing where it had been bridged, running instead westwards directly in front of the glacier to the river Gígjukvísl [ˈciːjʏˌkʰvistl̥], so that the river under the long Skeiðará bridge to the east carries very little water compared to before.

The bedrock geology of Skaftafell has been mapped in detail and a bedrock map of the area was published in 2007. It is available at the Skaftafell national park visitor center as well as in book stores in Reykjavik. A web site on the geology of Skaftafell (skaftafell.org) describes the varied rock types of the area. The oldest rocks in Skaftafell are about 5 million years old. Skaftafell strata display well the frequent shifts between glacial and inter-glacial conditions. The oldest tillite in the area is about 4 million years old.

The Skaftafell vicinity has experienced considerable volcanic activity, with the 1362 Öræfajökull eruption producing the most ash of any Icelandic volcano since the settlement and another, smaller Öræfajökull eruption occurring in 1727. As shown once again in 2011, the subglacial volcano Grímsvötn is the country's most active volcano, and is also famous for the huge jökulhlaups or glacial floods that originate from it.

== Plants and wildlife ==
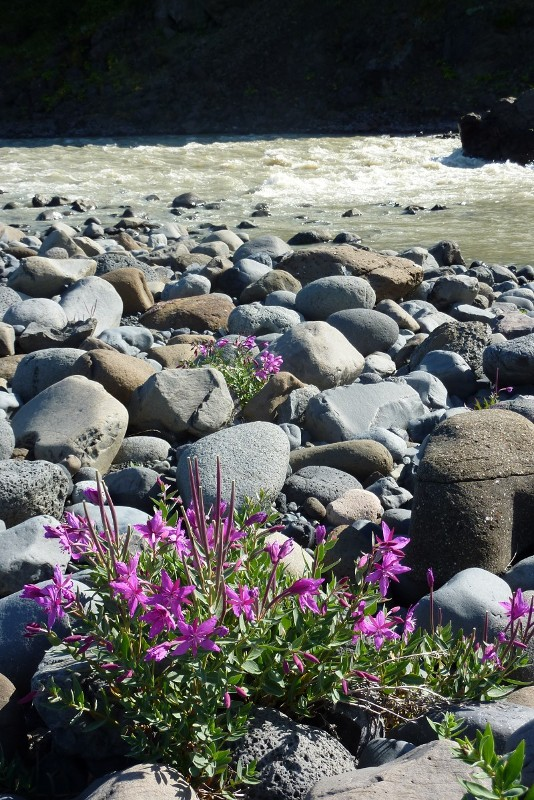
Arctic beauty grows next to Morsá glacial river

Compared to many south coast areas, Skaftafell has a mild, pleasant climate, often benefiting from the towering shelter of Öræfajökull. Birch trees and occasional rowans cover the rich undergrowth of the lower slopes and the birch trees in Bæjarstaðarskógur grow higher than most other native birch. Several flowering plants distinctive to East Iceland are common here: the harebell, yellow saxifrage, and pyramidal saxifrage.

Since sheep stopped grazing at Skaftafell, the vegetation has undergone great changes and is quickly making inroads on the glacial deposits in front of Skaftafellsjökull and in Morsárdalur valley. Species such as garden angelica, wild angelica, sea pea and arctic river beauty, are hardly ever found on grazing land, but have now become common. Birch and willows are also starting to colonise land.

Down in the Skaftafell woods, the redwing, redpoll, and wren are common, while the snipe, ptarmigan, golden plover, and meadow pipit, appear more frequently higher up the slopes. Other birds seen frequently include the raven, merlin, wheatear, and snow bunting. Although the sole wild mammals are the Arctic fox, mink and field mouse, the local insect fauna is considered quite diverse compared to most of Iceland.

== National park and tourism ==
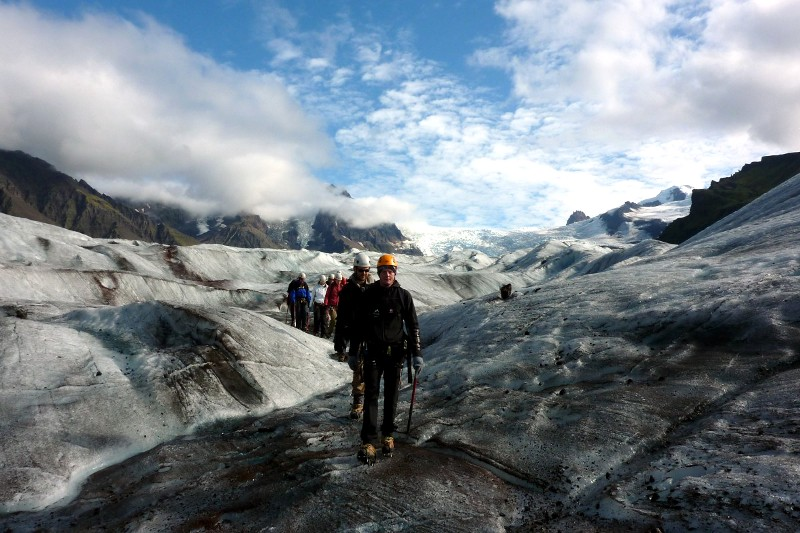
Glacier hike on Svínafellsjökull

When Vatnajökull National Park was founded in the summer of 2008, the former Skaftafell National Park became part of it. Skaftafell has been protected since 1967, with the aim of opening it up to the public while also conserving its flora and fauna, landscape and cultural remains.

Open all year, the Skaftafell Visitor Centre serves the Southern Territory of Vatnajökull National Park and provides information on the park and its environs, trails, nature and history, as well as on other recreation and services. Display boards at the Centre describe the intertwined history of people and nature at Skaftafell. Skaftafell has a selection of hiking trails, and the spacious campground has facilities for tents, folding camping trailers and camping vehicles. While the campground only stays open from 1 May to 30 September, camping in other seasons is possible after obtaining permission from park personnel.

In recent decades, Skaftafell and the Öræfi district has shifted from a dependence on sheep farming to large-scale tourism. Skaftafell has emerged as one of the most popular locations for glacier tourism with most tours run on the nearby Svínafellsjökull [ˈsviːnaˌfɛlsˌjœːkʏtl̥] (pre-2018) and Falljökull [ˈfatlˌjœːkʏtl̥] (post-2018). As of mid-2018, four large and several smaller organisations were running tours on the glaciers.

In the summertime, park rangers offer guided walks and various additional events are also offered, such as lectures and children's activities.

== See also ==
- Waterfalls of Iceland
