= Hof, Iceland =

Place in South Iceland

Hof
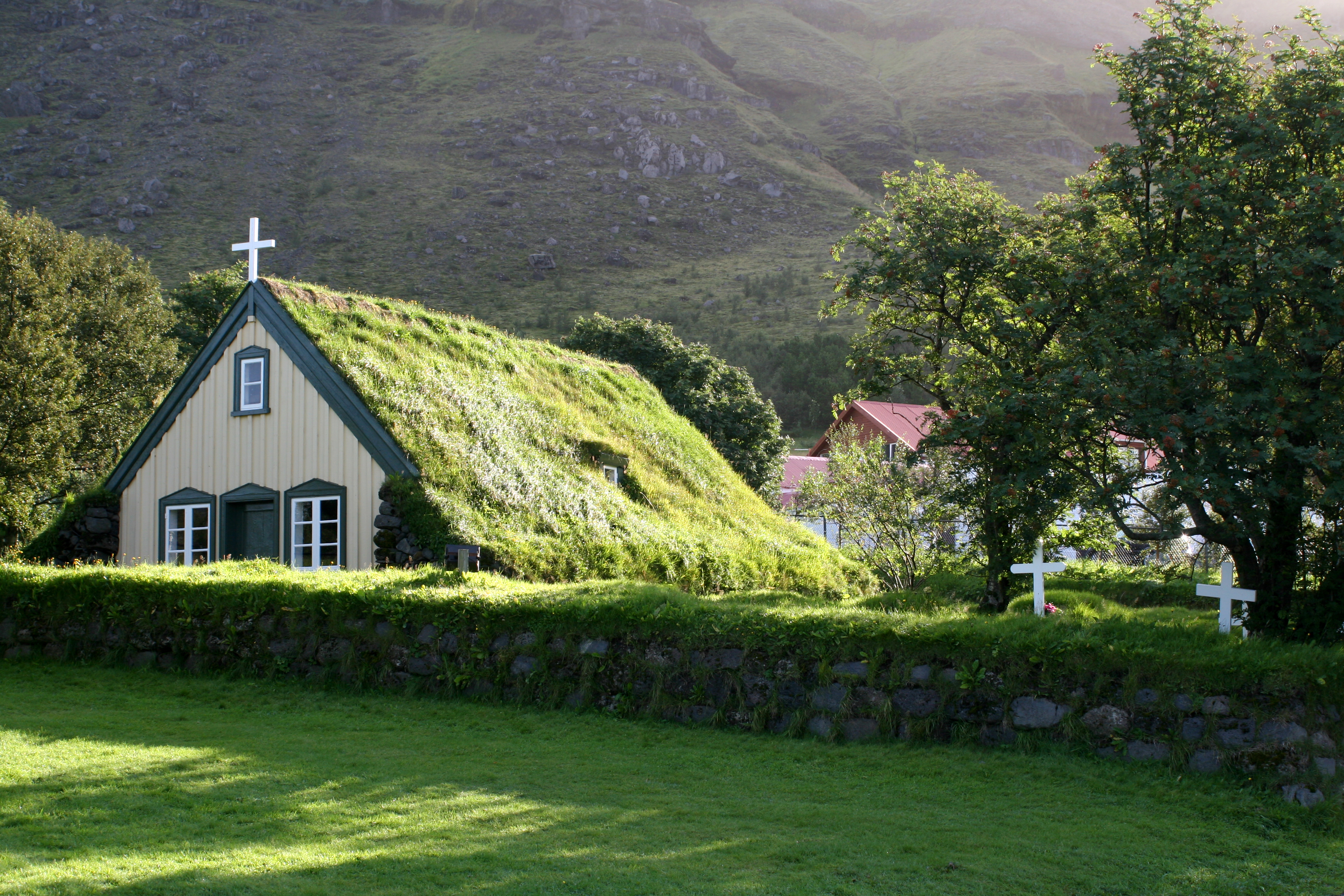
- Wood and turf church at Hof.

- Location in Iceland
- Coordinates: 63°54′24″N 16°42′26″W
- Country: Iceland
- Constituency: South
- Region: Eastern Region
- County: Austur-Skaftafellssýsla
- Municipality: Sveitarfélagið Hornafjörður
- Elevation: 330 ft (100 m)
- Time zone: UTC+0 (GMT)
- Post Code: 785

Hof, (Icelandic pronunciation: [ˈhɔːf]) in Öræfi, is a cluster of farms in the municipality of Sveitarfélagið Hornafjörður in southeast Iceland, close to Vatnajökull glacier, and twenty-two kilometres south of Skaftafell in Vatnajökull National Park. It is on the Route 1 southwest of Höfn, in the narrow strip between the sea coast and the glacier.

It is 9.14 km WSW of the centre of Öræfajökull volcano.

A notable building in Hof is a turf church, which was built in 1883 and is the youngest turf church in Iceland. Since 1951, it belongs to the National Museum of Iceland.
