= Núpsvötn =

River in Iceland

Coordinates: 63°49′49″N 17°32′45″W

Núpsvötn is a glacial river on Skeiðarársandur in Iceland. It is created by the confluence of the rivers Núpsár and Súla west of the Skeiðarárjökull. South of Lómagnúpur, Núpsvatn merges with Hverfisfljót, which flows to the sea.

== Núpsvötn bridge ==
The bridge over Núpsvötn is a 430-meter one lane bridge built in 1973. In December 2018, it was the site of a car accident were three British tourists died and four were seriously injured after their car went off the bridge and fell eight meters to the riverbank below. The accident highlighted the state of the road system in Iceland, especially in the southern region, and the increased pressure on it due to the increase of tourists in the country. In 2022, the accident was covered in the investigative TV-show Kveikur on RÚV.
