= Outwash plain =

Plain formed from glacier sediment transported by meltwater

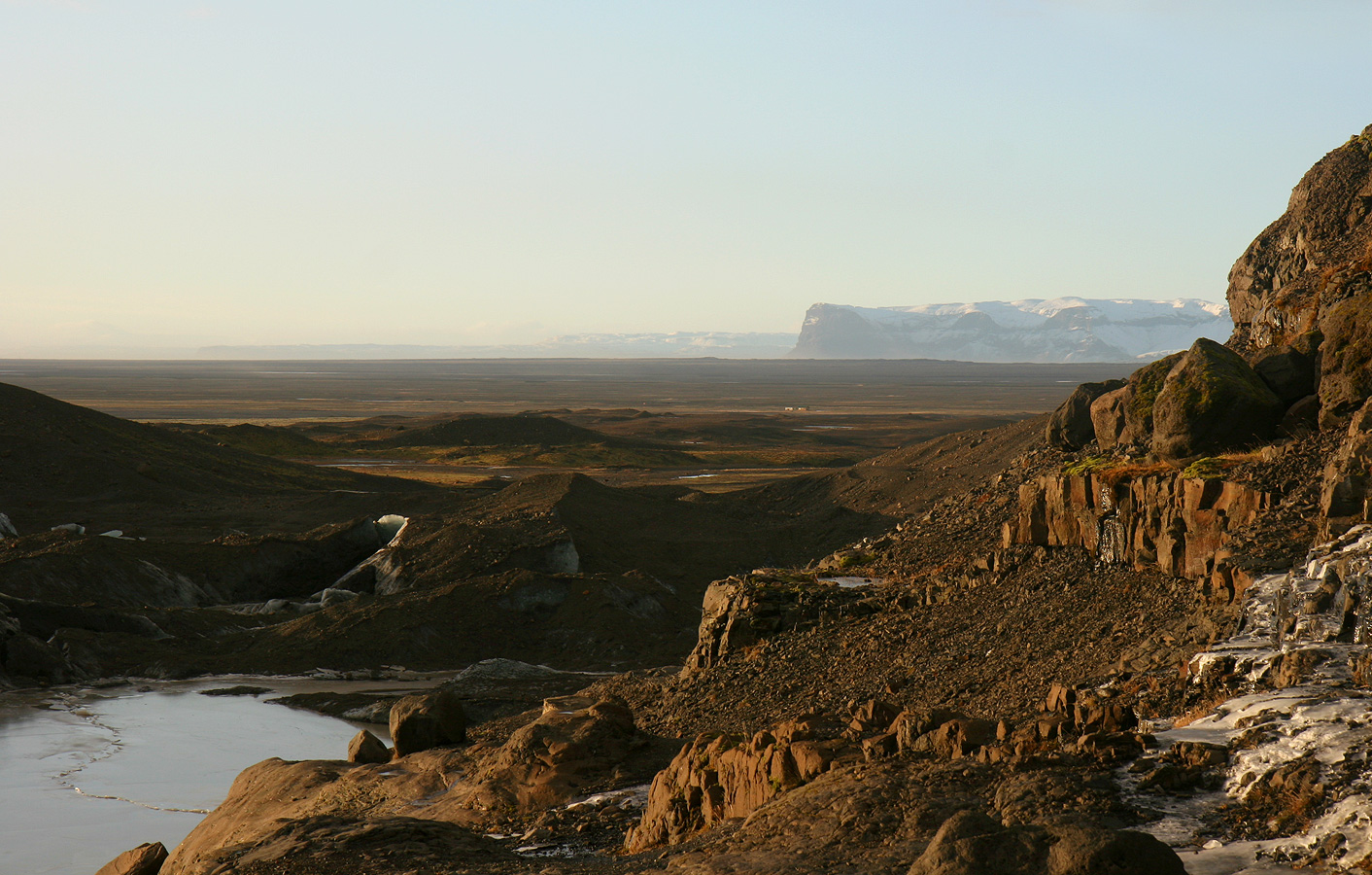
Skeiðarársandur in Iceland, viewed from its eastern margin at the terminus of Svínafellsjökull glacier

An outwash plain, also called a sandur (plural: sandurs), sandr or sandar, is a plain formed of glaciofluvial deposits due to meltwater outwash at the terminus of a glacier. Outwash plains are used in reference to Moraines. As it flows, the glacier grinds the underlying rock surface and carries the debris along. The meltwater at the snout of the glacier deposits its load of sediment over the outwash plain, with larger boulders being deposited near the terminal moraine, and smaller particles travelling further before being deposited. Sandurs are common in Iceland where geothermal activity accelerates the melting of ice flows and the deposition of sediment by meltwater.

== Formation ==
Sandurs are found in glaciated areas, such as Svalbard, Kerguelen Islands, and Iceland. Glaciers and icecaps contain large amounts of silt and sediment, picked up as they erode the underlying rocks when they move slowly downhill, and at the snout of the glacier, meltwater can carry this sediment away from the glacier and deposit it on a broad plain. The material in the outwash plain is often size-sorted by the water runoff of the melting glacier with the finest materials, like silt, being the most distantly re-deposited, whereas larger boulders are the closest to the original terminus of the glacier.

An outwash plain might contain surficial braided stream complexes that rework the original deposits. They may also contain kettle lakes, locations where blocks of ice have melted, leaving a depression that fills with water. The flow pattern of glacial rivers across sandar is typically diffuse and unchannelized, but in situations where the glacial snout has retreated from the terminal moraine, the flow is more channelized.

Sandurs are most common in Iceland, where geothermal activity beneath ice caps speeds up the deposition of sediment by meltwater. As well as regular geothermal activity, volcanic activity gives rise to large glacial bursts several times a century, which carry down large volumes of sediment.

The Gaspé Peninsula that makes up the essential part of southern Quebec (Lower St-Lawrence and Gaspé areas) also contains several examples of paleo-sandar, dating from the Pleistocene ice melt.

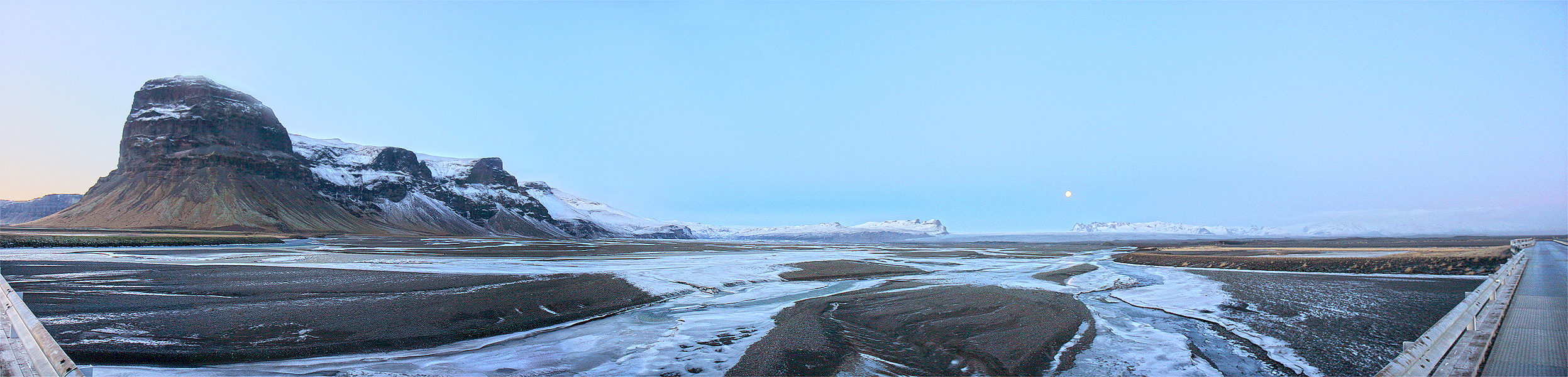
The western edge of Skeiðarársandur in Iceland shows the diffuse drainage channels typical of sandur.

== The prototype sandur ==
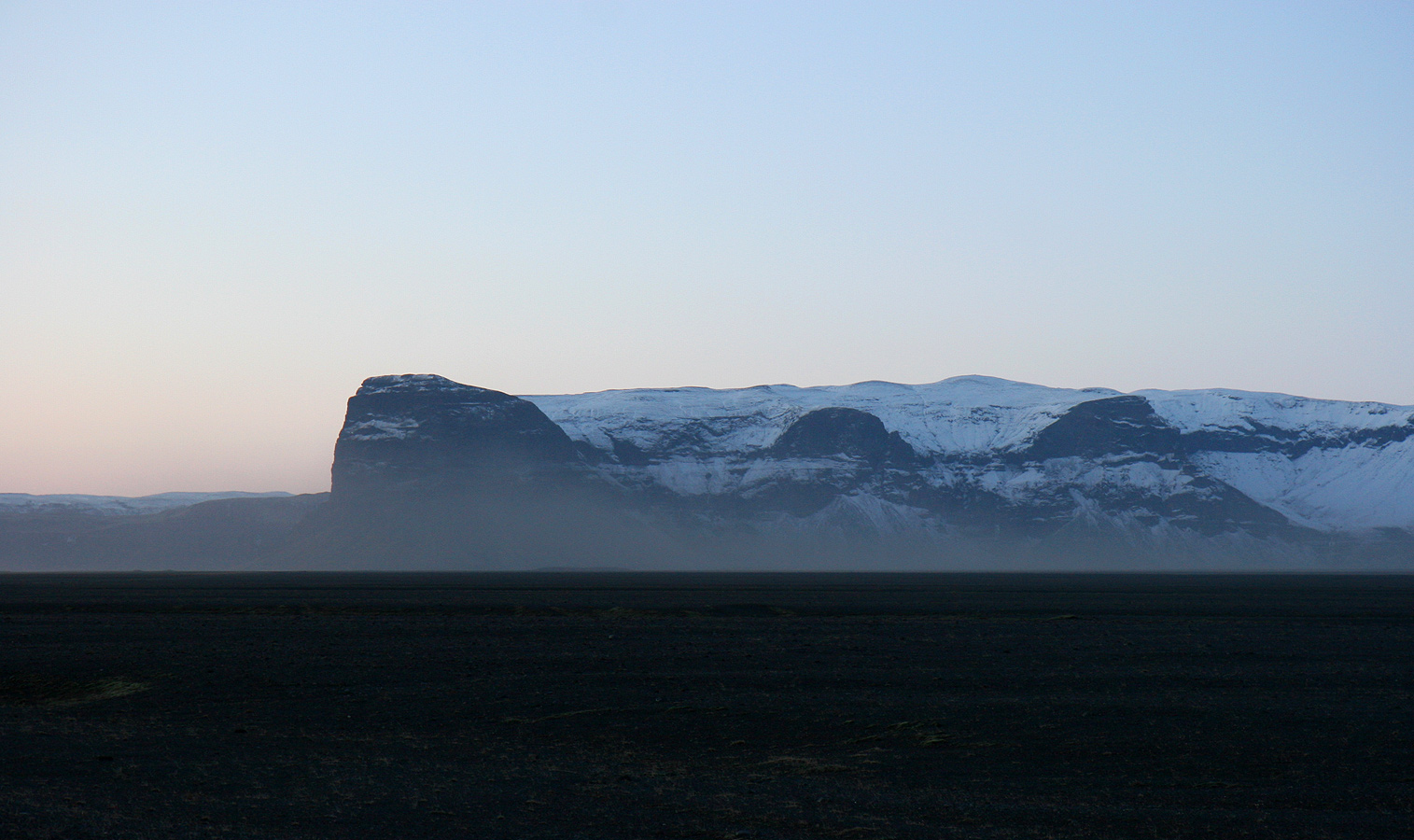
Unimpeded by topographic obstructions, sand-bearing katabatic winds can be fierce enough on Skeiðarársandur to strip paint from cars. Here, sand is blown in the air in front of the peak Lómagnúpur.

One of the sandurs from which the general name is derived is Skeiðarársandur, a broad sandy wasteland along Iceland's south-eastern coast, between the Vatnajökull icecap and the sea. Volcanic eruptions under the icecap have given rise to many large glacial bursts (jökulhlaups in Icelandic), most recently in 1996, when the Ring Road was washed away (minor floods have also occurred since then). This road, which encircles Iceland and was completed in 1974, has since been repaired. The 1996 jökulhlaup was caused by the eruption of the Grímsvötn volcano, with peak flow estimated to be 50,000 m^{3}/s (1,800,000 cu ft/s) compared to the normal summer peak flow of 200 to 400 m^{3}/s (7,100–14,100 cu ft/s). Net deposition of sediment was estimated to be 12,800,000 m^{3} (450,000,000 cu ft).

The main braided channels of Skeiðarársandur are the Gígjukvísl and Skeiðará rivers, which incurred net gains of 29 and 24 cm (11.4 and 9.4 in) respectively during the 1996 jökulhlaup. In the Gígjukvísl there was massive sediment deposition of up to 12 m (39 ft), which occurred closest to the terminus of the glacier. The erosional patterns of Skeiðarársandur can be seen by looking at the centimetre-scale elevation differences measured with repeat-pass laser altimetry (LIDAR) flown in 1996 (pre-flood), 1997, and 2001. Of the overall deposition during the 1996 jökulhlaup, nearly half of the net gain had been eroded 4 years after the flood. These two rivers on the sandur display drastically different erosional patterns. The difference in sediment erosion can be attributed to the 2 km (1.2 mi) wide trench near the terminus where the Gígjukvísl flows, in contrast with the Skeiðará, which has braided flows directly onto the outwash plain. The Gígjukvísl river is where some of the highest level of sediment deposit occurred and also where the largest erosion happened afterward. This indicates that these massive jökulhlaup deposits may have a large geomorphic impact in the short term, but the net change on the surface relief could be minimal after a couple of years to a decade.

The observed change of Skeiðarársandur from a diffuse to a channelized distributary system where it has the most observed sediment deposit has a significant impact on the development of the fluvial succession in the proximal zone. However, in order to have sustained active accretion across the entire sandur there needs to be a diffuse, multipoint distribution system. The system of accumulation on Skeiðarársandur, which is a product of glacier retreat, can be seen as multiple regions of differing channel patterns that distribute sediment across the plain in dynamic configurations.

== Fossil sandar ==
Fossil sandar (i.e. no longer active) are found in areas which were formerly glaciated. An example would be the Usk Valley of South Wales where, towards the end of the last ice age, the receding Usk valley glacier left behind a series of recessional moraines and sandar deposits down-valley of them. Many of the sandar surfaces are still visible, albeit degraded over succeeding millennia. Extensive sandar are also recorded in the eastern part of the Cheshire Plain and beneath Morecambe Bay, both in northwest England. 'Valley sandur' deposits are recorded from various localities in that same region.

== See also ==
- Kankakee Outwash Plain – Plain in Indiana and Illinois, United States
- Terminal moraine – Type of moraine that forms at the terminal of a glacier
