= Het Wapen van Amsterdam =

History

Netherlands
- Name: Het Wapen van Amsterdam
- Operator: Dutch East India Company
- Fate: Wrecked off Iceland in 1667

General characteristics
- Type: Sailing ship
- Propulsion: Sail
- Complement: 150–165

Het Wapen van Amsterdam was a Dutch merchant vessel that stranded in Skeiðarársandur, Iceland, on 19 September 1667. It is commonly known as Gullskipið (English: The Goldship) in Iceland due to beliefs that it was carrying a large amount of gold and diamonds. For the next few decades, several items from the ship and its cargo were salvaged despite difficulties to reach the wreck but it is not known if the salvagers managed to reach the main cargo hold. Several attempts were made to locate it in the 20th century, most notably during the 1980's, without success.

== Wreck ==
Het Wapen van Amsterdam was part of a convoy coming from the island of Java in September 1667 with a cargo of gold, pearls, diamonds, silver, copper, silk, spices and other precious items. It had a crew of around 150–165 men and further 100–150 passengers or soldiers on board. It got caught in a storm and ran aground in the sands of Skeiðarársandur on 19 September 1667 while the other ships in the convoy were scattered before reaching Faroe Islands, except the ship Walcheren that perished. While most of the crew and passengers survived the wreck and made it to the beach, only 50–80 men made it off to safety.
