= Öræfasveit =

Region of Iceland

Coordinates: 63°54′32″N 16°39′29″W

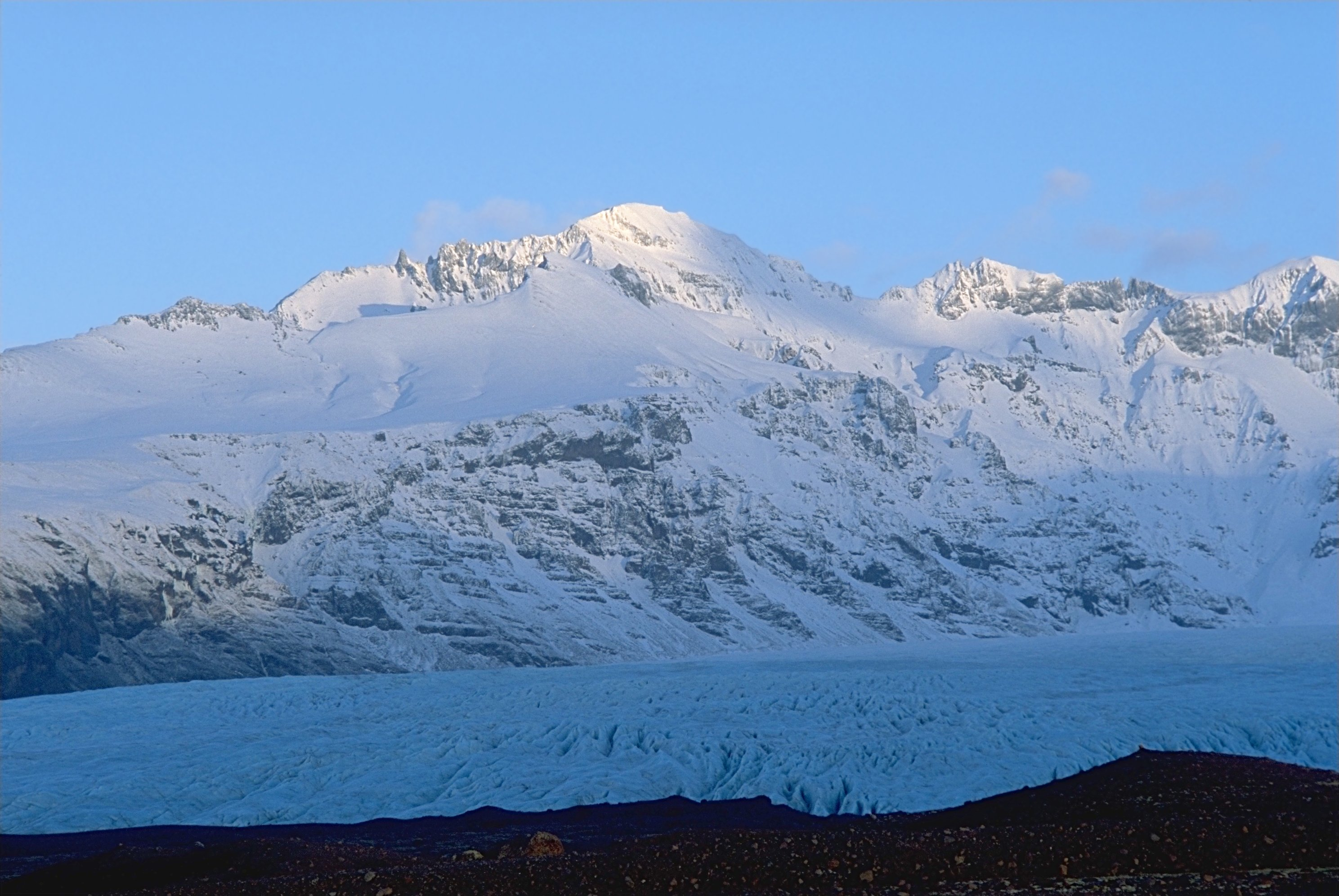
Sunrise at Öræfi on the glacier Skaftafellsjökull

Öræfi [ˈœːrˌaiːvɪ] (previously called Litlahérað [ˈlɪhtlaˌçɛːraθ], "little district") is a western region in Austur-Skaftafellssýsla, Iceland. It lies between Breiðamerkursandur and the river Skeiðará, east of the village of Kirkjubæjarklaustur and South, West and East of the Öræfajökull volcano. It has been a part of the municipality of Hornafjörður since 1998. In the Middle Ages, this region was called Hérað or Litlahérað, but was deserted in the wake of the 1362 eruption of Öræfajökull and the subsequent flooding of the region. After these events, the region was simply called Öræfi ("wilderness/desolation").

Historically, the region was very isolated since two large rivers hindered access from both the east and west. This isolation continued until the Jökulsá á Breiðamerkursandi river was traversed by the Route 1 Ring Road and the Skeiðará bridge in 1974.

Skaftafell National Park was established in Öræfi in 1967. It merged into the much larger Vatnajökull National Park in 2008.
