= Nesjahverfi =

- human settlement
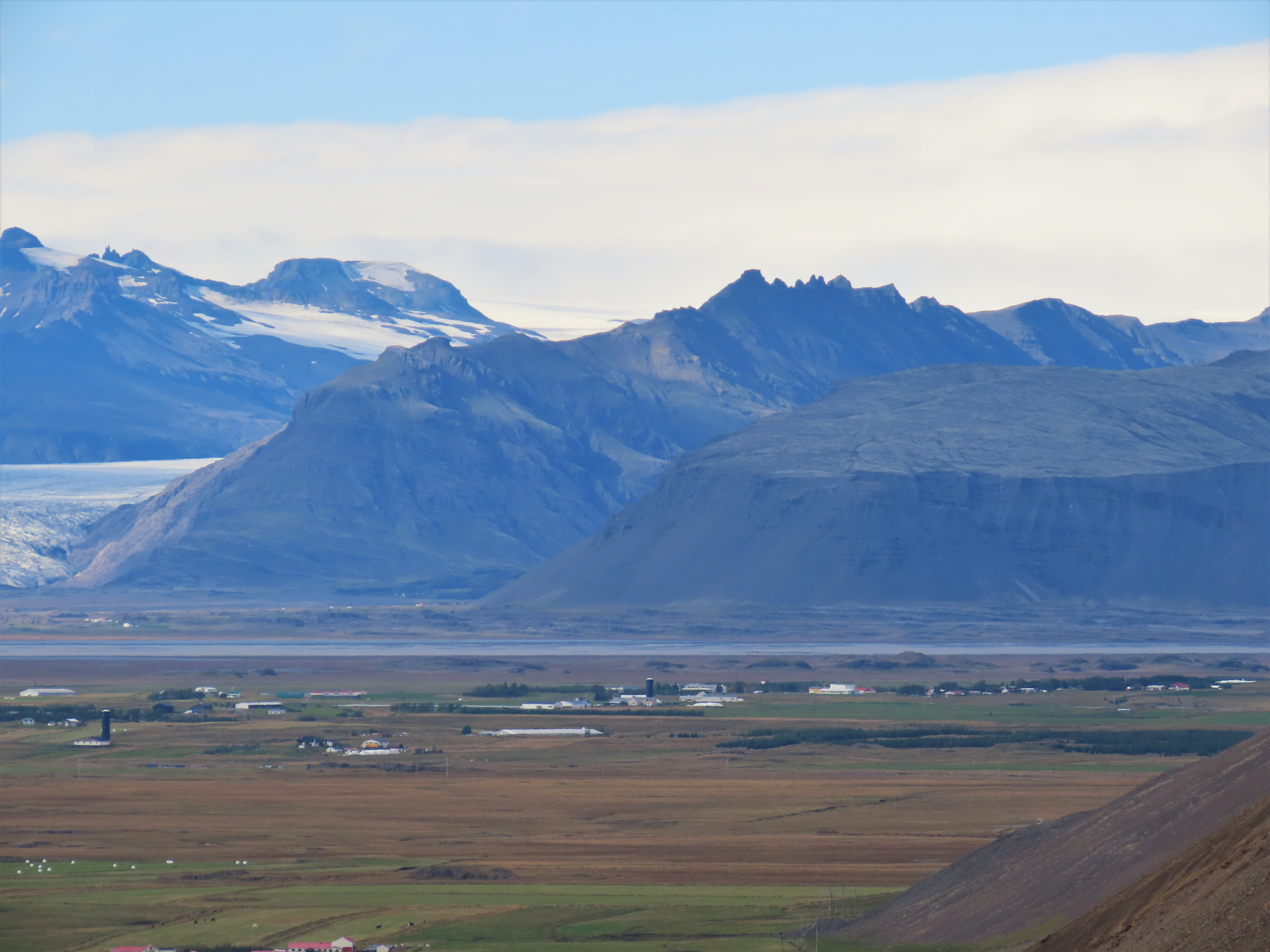
- Interactive map of Nesjahverfi
- Coordinates: 64°18′52″N 15°13′30″W
- Country: Iceland

Population (1 January 2018)
  - Total: 92

Nesjahverfi (Icelandic pronunciation: [ˈnɛːsjaˌkʰvɛrvɪ]) is a village located in Hornafjörður, a fjord region in southeastern Iceland. The population is of around 92 inhabitants in 2018.
