= Almannaskarðsgöng =

Tunnel in Iceland

Coordinates: 64°16′57″N 15°2′21″W

Almannaskarð Tunnel
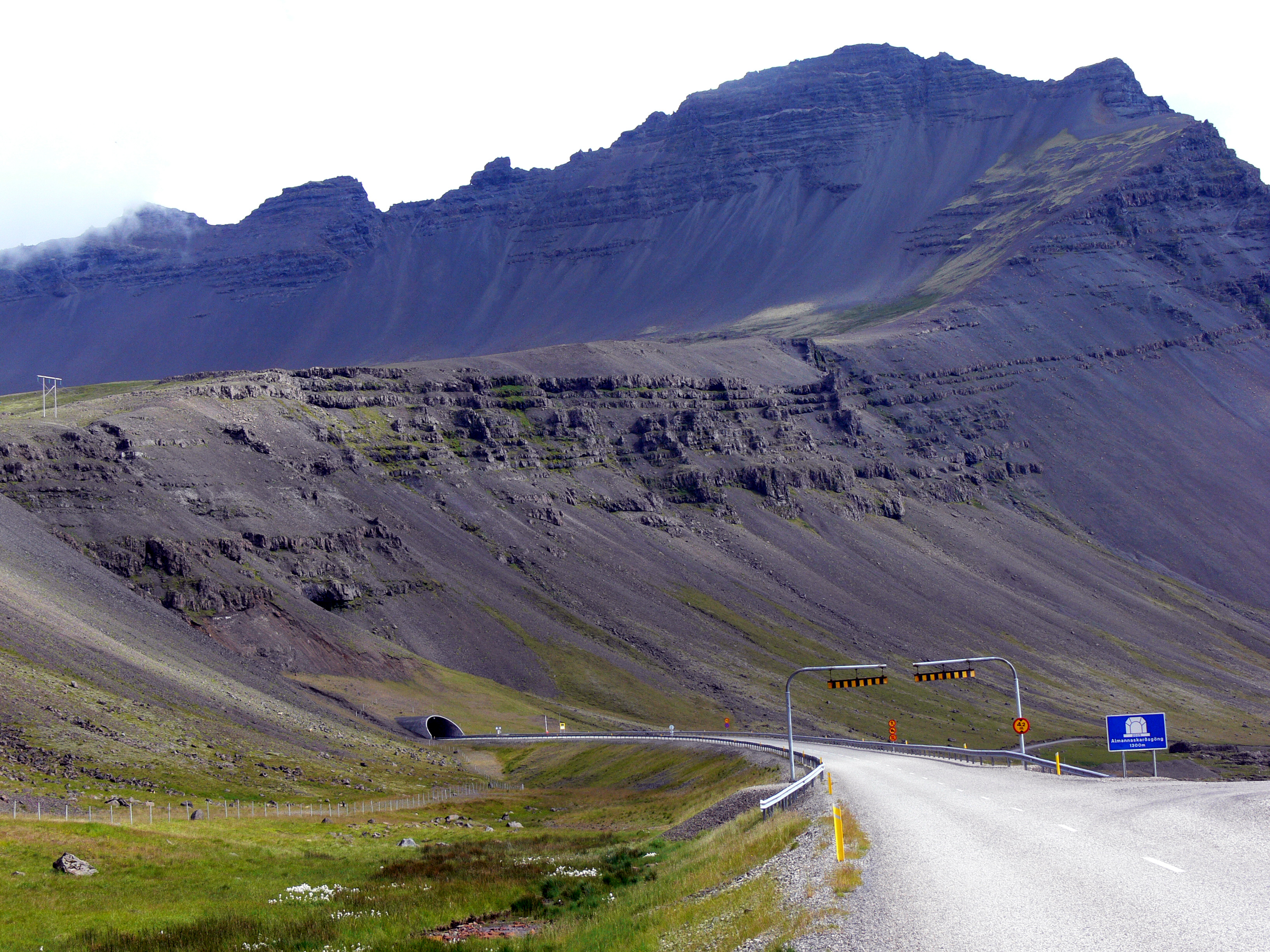
- Southwestern entrance
- Interactive map of Almannaskarð Tunnel

Overview
- Location: Höfn, Iceland
- Route: 1

Operation
- Work began: 2004
- Opened: 2005
- Operator: Vegagerðin
- Traffic: Automotive
- Vehicles per day: Summer: 1300; Winter: 285

Technical
- Length: 1.3 km (0.81 mi)
- No. of lanes: 2
- Max elevation: 82 m (269 ft)
- Min elevation: 39 m (128 ft)
- Grade: 4.6%

Almannaskarðsgöng (Icelandic pronunciation: [ˈalˌmannaˌskarðsˌkœyŋk], lit. 'Almannaskarð Tunnel') is a tunnel along Route 1, located just east of the town of Höfn (Hornafjörður) in the Eastern Region of Iceland.

The construction of the tunnel began in March 2004, the breakthrough was in October that same year, and the tunnel was opened on June 24, 2005. The tunnel runs through 1,150 metres of solid rock and some 162 metres of concrete portals, bringing the total length to 1,312 metres (although a sign rounds it off to 1,300 m). The tunnel is two lanes wide, with three passing areas for emergency traffic. The southern tunnel entrance is located 39 m above sea level whilst the northern tunnel entrance is 82 m high, making the incline of the tunnel 4.6%.

The tunnel replaced the narrow and steep Almannaskarð pass which was regularly closed during the winter because of snow, impeding traffic to and from the east of Iceland. The pass is still accessible in the summertime from the northern ramp, there is parking, with a beautiful view. (The southwest ramp is closed to public traffic).

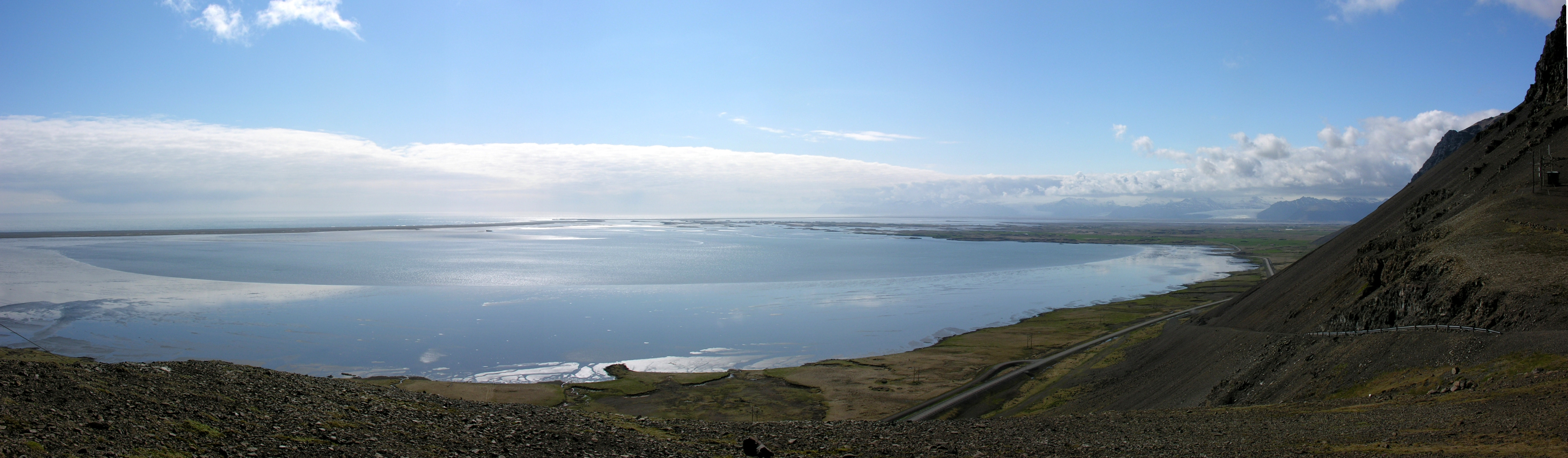
View from the old mountain pass.
