= Höfn =

Höfn Höfn í Hornafirði
- Town
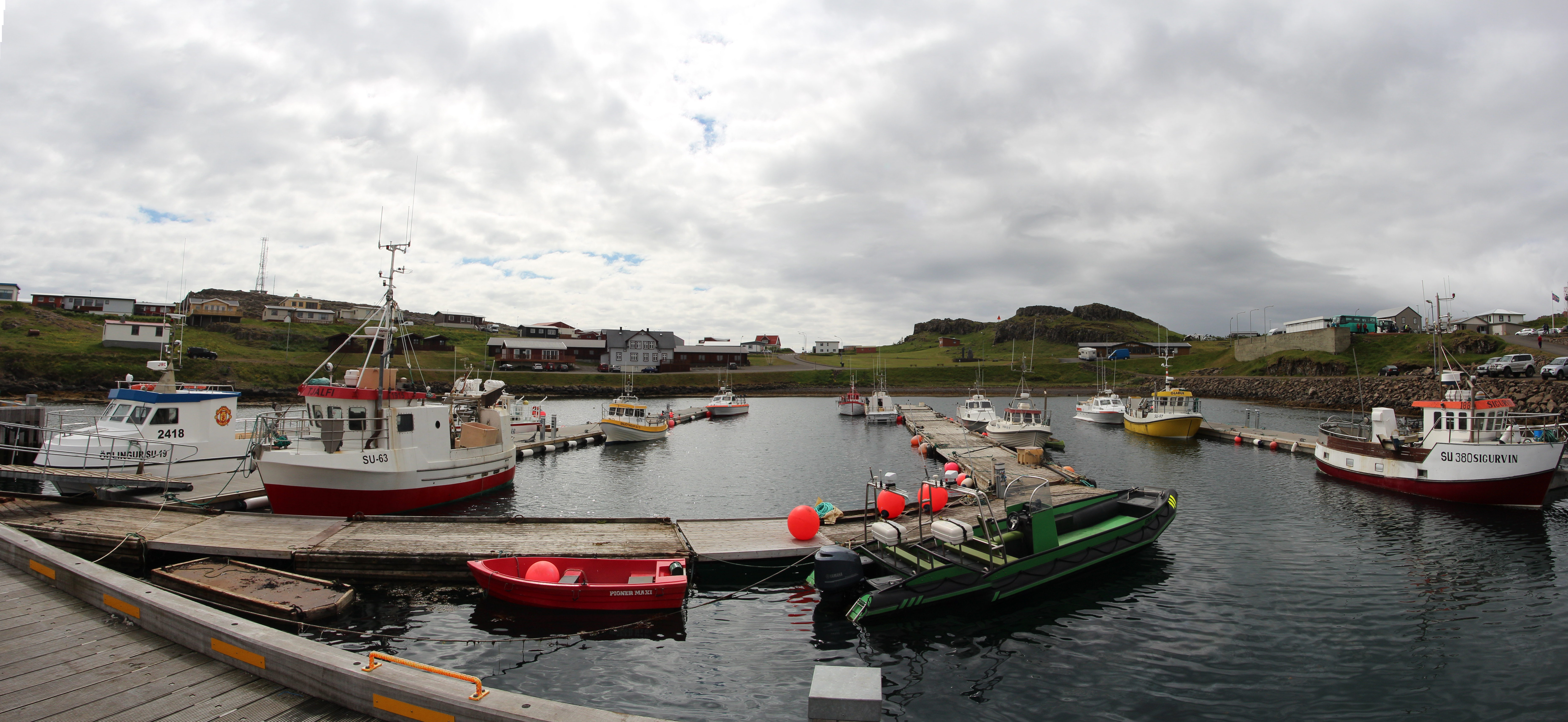
- Höfn Harbour

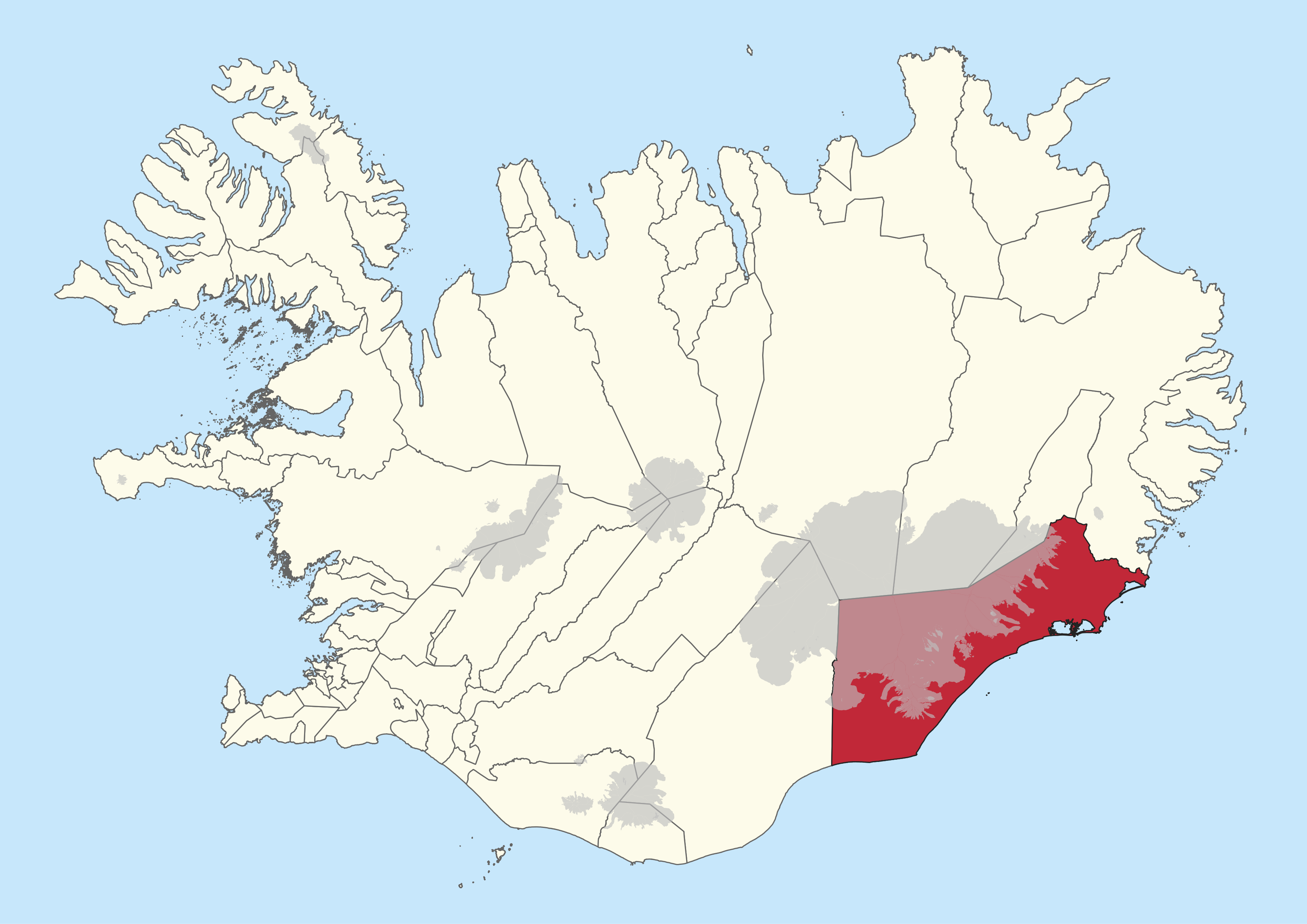
- Location of the municipality of Hornafjörður

- Location in Iceland
- Coordinates: 64.254°N 15.212°W
- Country: Iceland
- Region: Southern Region
- Constituency: South Constituency
- Municipality: Hornafjörður

Population (2025)
  - Total: 1,802
- Postal code: 780
- Website: hornafjordur.is

Höfn (Icelandic pronunciation: [ˈhœpn̥]; or Höfn í Hornafirði; [ˈhœpn iː ˈhɔ(r)tnaˌfɪrðɪ], lit. 'Höfn in Hornafjörður') is a fishing town in southeastern Iceland. It lies near Hornafjörður fjord.

The town, the second largest in the southeastern part of Iceland, offers scenic views of Vatnajökull (the largest ice cap in Europe by volume). The community was formerly known as Hornafjarðarbær between 1994 and 1998.

== Geography ==
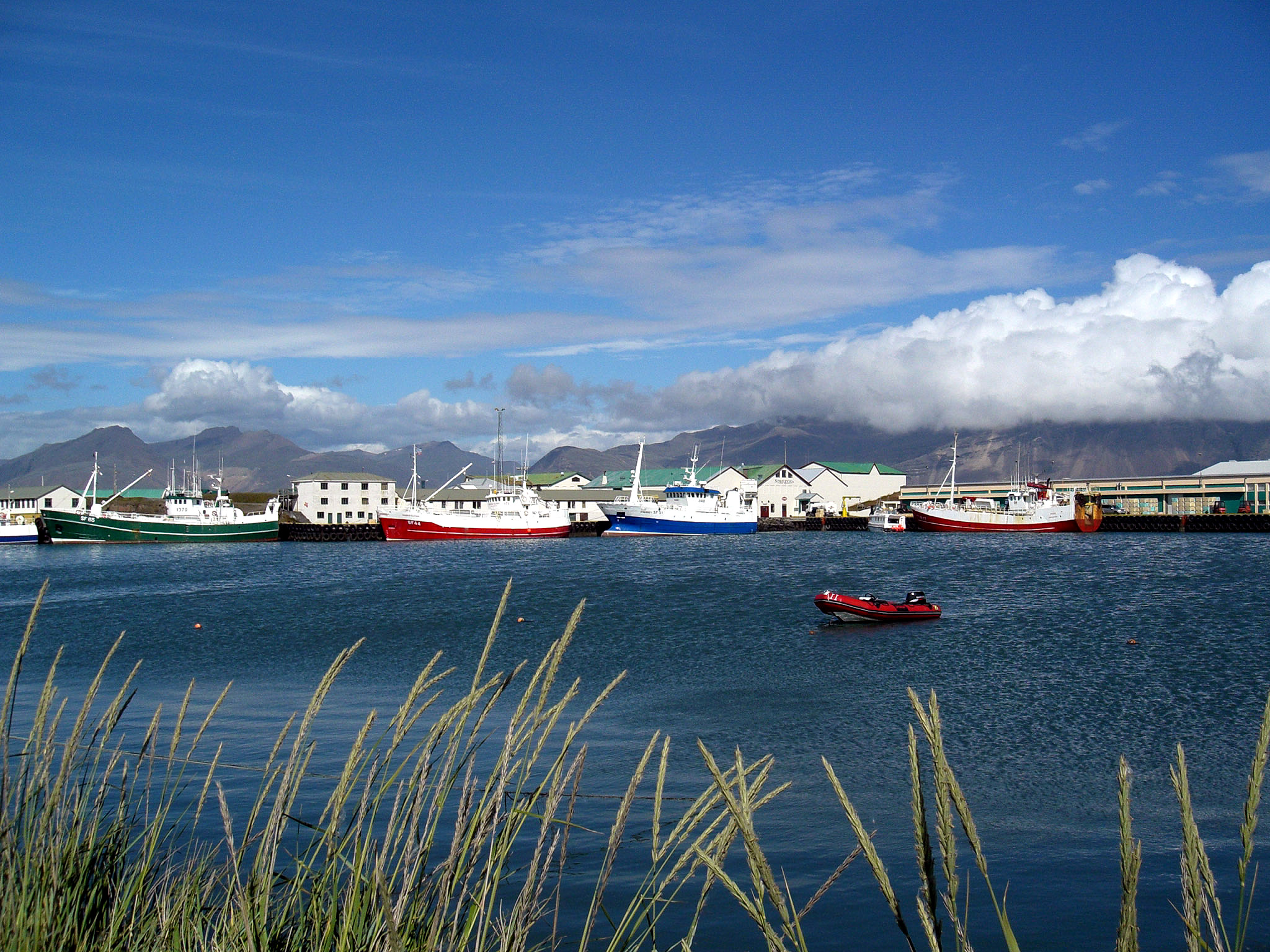
Höfn harbour

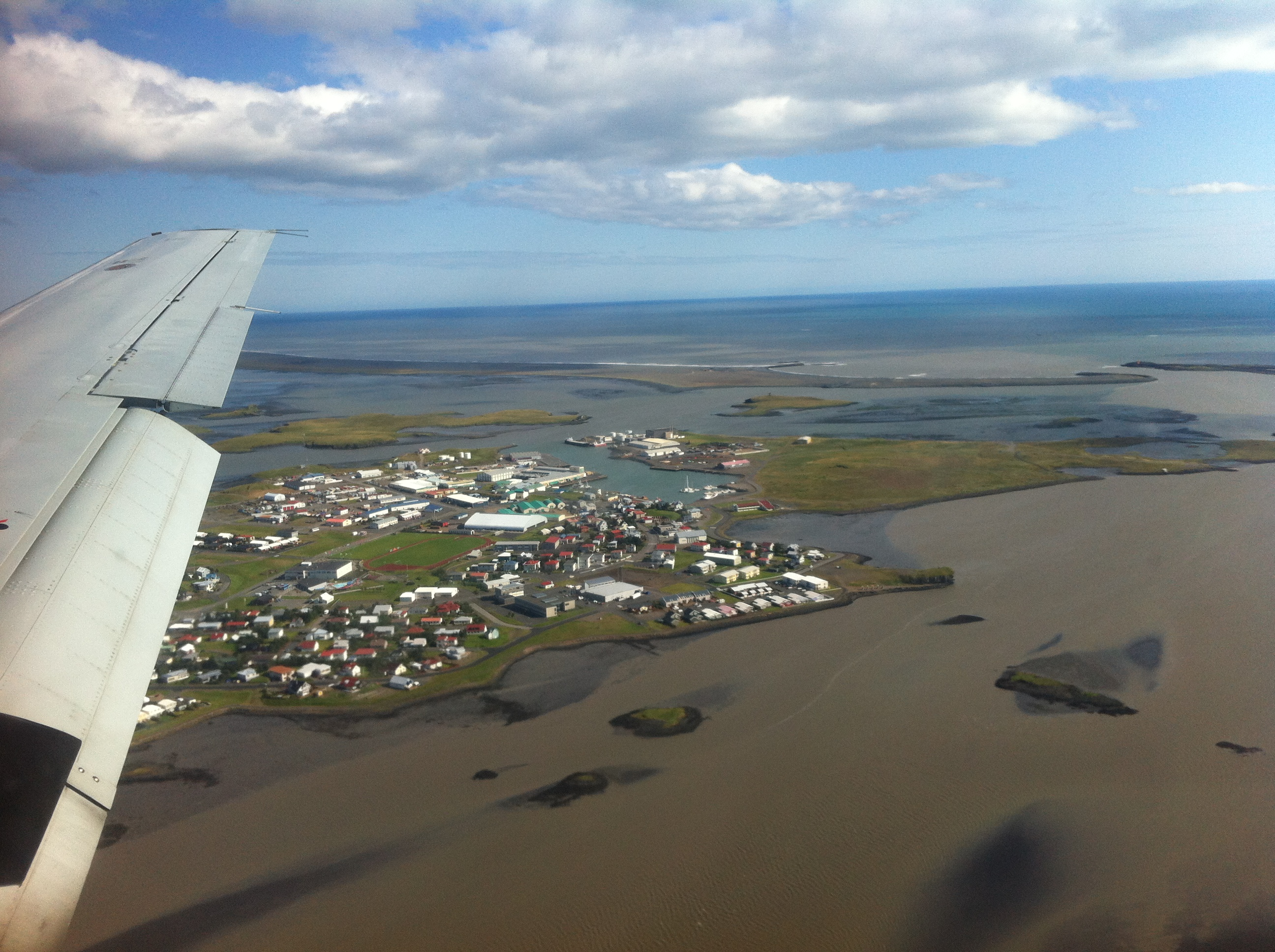
Höfn from above

Höfn is located on a peninsula in the southeast of Iceland. The name Höfn means harbour and it is a fishing port surrounded on three sides by the sea, with beaches on a long shoreline to the southeast. Shoals and glacial rivers traverse this area with many shifting lagoons and sand reefs being formed. Höfn is surrounded by several small islands to the east of the town, the largest of which is Mikley ([ˈmɪhklˌeiː]), followed by Krókalátur ([ˈkʰrouːkaˌlauːtʏr̥]) and Hellir ([ˈhɛtlɪr̥]).

Nearby areas include Suðursveit [ˈsʏːðʏrˌsveiːt] (the birthplace of Þórbergur Þórðarson), Öræfasveit, Lón [ˈlouːn], Mýrar [ˈmiːrar̥] and Nes [ˈnɛːs]. In Nes there is a small village called Nesjahverfi. Reykjavík, the capital of Iceland, is about 458 kilometres (285 mi) from Höfn along the south coast. The headland of the town is called the Ingólfshöfði, which is 76 metres (249 ft) high and 85 kilometres (53 mi) (in a direct line) from the town. Sea birds such as skuas, guillemots, fulmars and puffins can be seen from the headland.

== History ==
Höfn was founded by the merchant Ottó Tuliníus in 1897 who relocated a trading place which had been established in 1861 from Papós, an area 15 km northwest of Höfn, to the present site of the town. Höfn had 300 inhabitants in 1946. An economic boom started after the construction of the bridge Hornafjarðarbrú [ˈhɔ(r)tnaˌfjarðarˌpruː] in 1961, with a length of 255 metres the bridge was the second largest bridge in Iceland at that time. Höfn attained municipal status on 31 December 1988 and had 1 647 inhabitants in 1989. Höfn and the community of Nesjahreppur were united on 12 July 1994 under the name Hornafjarðarbær [ˈhɔ(r)tnaˌfjarðarˌpaiːr̥]. On 6 June 1998 Hornafjarðarbær, Bæjarhreppur [ˈpaiːjar̥ˌr̥ɛhpʏr̥], Borgarhafnarhreppur [ˈpɔrkarˌhapnar̥ˌr̥ɛhpʏr̥] and Hofshreppur [ˈhɔfsˌr̥ɛhpʏr̥] were united to form the new municipality of Sveitarfélagið Hornafjörður [ˈsveiːtarˌfjɛːˌlaijɪð ˈhɔ(r)tnaˌfjœrðʏr̥].

== Economy ==
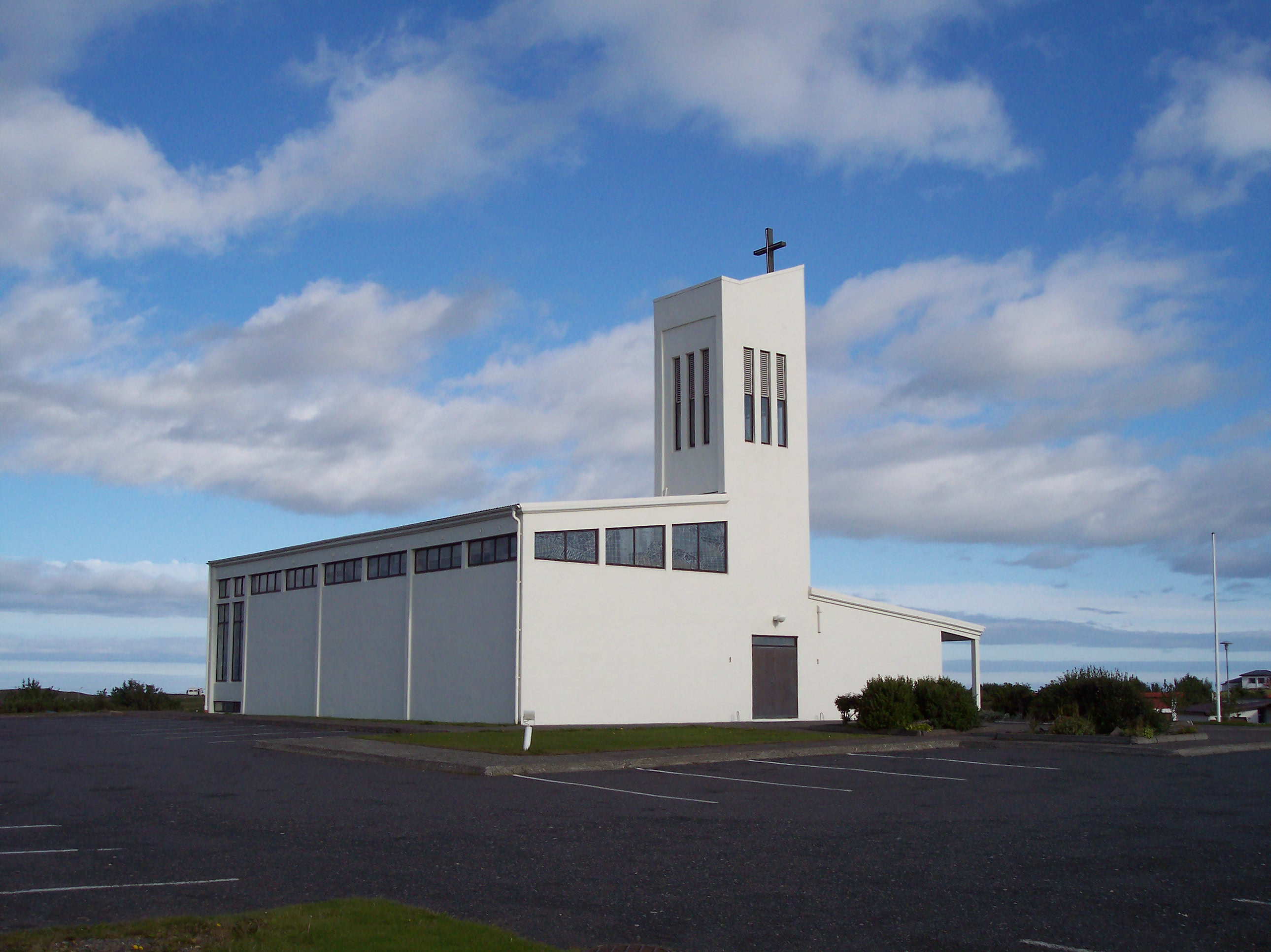
Hafnarkirkja, Höfn

The main economic activities in Höfn are fishing and tourism. Fishing involves both sea fishing and processing and packaging in the factories; one major fish processing factory, Skinney-Þinganes is one of the largest fish factories in the eastern part of Iceland, which employs a large number of people. The main production of these factories is bacaloa (saltfish) and processed lobster. Herring and capelin are also processed. Ten large and a number of smaller boats operate from Höfn. During the summer tourist season, trips are organised to the nearby Vatnajökull glacier. The surrounding area has served as a filming location for feature films including the James Bond movies Die Another Day and A View to a Kill, Lara Croft: Tomb Raider, and Batman Begins. Recently a song in the 2015 Bollywood movie "Dilwale" has been shot in the surrounding areas.

== Culture ==
A cultural highlight of the town is the annual Humarhátíð [ˈhʏːmarˌhauːˌtʰiːθ] (a lobster festival) held on the first weekend of July. During the summer season, the Glacier Exhibition is held in the old supermarket building. Hafnarkirkja [ˈhapnarˌcʰɪr̥ca] is a modern protestant church for 200 persons was inaugurated on 28 July 1966. Kirkja heilagrar fjölskyldu og heilags Jean-Marie Vianney is a small modern Roman Catholic church which was inaugurated on 7 September 2013.

Höfn contains several museums, including an exhibition about Vatnajökull National Park in Gamlabúð [ˈkamlaˌpuːθ] which has a variety of displays on the geology, ecology and history of the glacier. Listasafn Svavars Guðnasonar [ˈlɪstaˌsapn ˈsvaːˌvar̥s ˈkvʏðnaˌsɔːnar̥] is a museum of art which was inaugurated in the town hall in 2011.

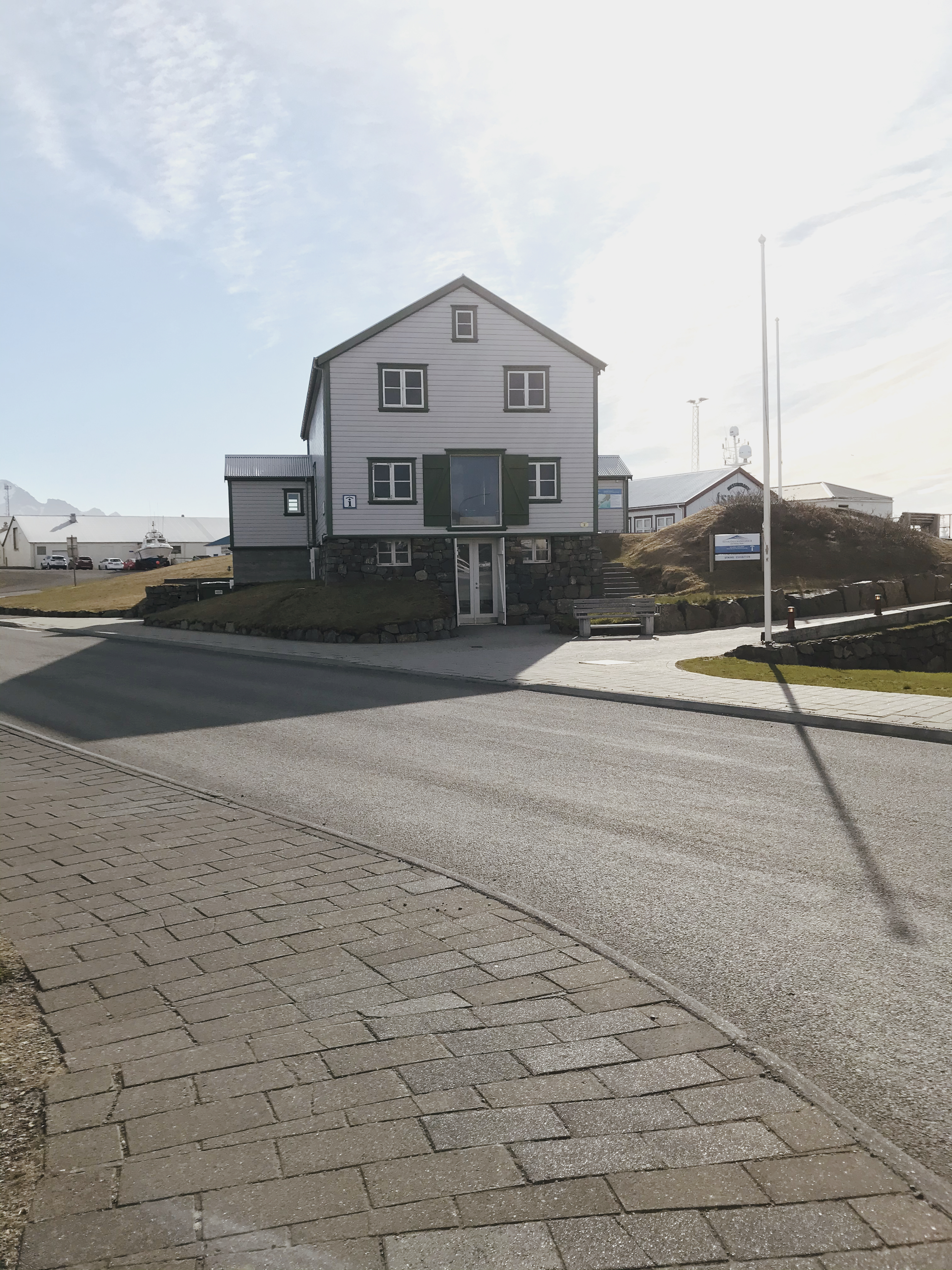

Gamlabúð ("Old Shop") is one of the oldest houses in Höfn still being used. It has served at least three purposes and has been moved around southeast Iceland. First it was a trade center in Papós and then it was a store in Höfn. Most recently it has been moved again and now it serves as an information center. Originally called "Krambúðin" [ˈkʰramˌpuːðɪn], meaning "The Mercantile Store", in a short time it had managed to become one of the main trade centers for the people of southeast Iceland, as there were few other settlements in the area. Just about everything available in these parts of Iceland were sold here. Farmers were the main group of people making purchases, so naturally it sold mostly tools and things that farmers needed on a daily basis. In 1897 it was moved to the harbor of Höfn and stayed there for 80 years. The house was the main trade post for the citizens of Höfn from 1937-1977, but when the town began to develop and modernize, the shop had neither a place at the harbor or in the town so it changed and moved, this time to Sílavík [ˈsiːlaˌviːk] on the outskirts of town. The municipality decided to move it again in 2012, back to the harbour of Höfn. This was done with the blessing of The Cultural Heritage Agency of Iceland which oversees the conservation of historical buildings. It now serves as an information and visitor centre for Vatnajökull National Park.

== Education ==
Höfn used to have three schools: Nesjaskóli, located in Nesjahverfi, Hafnarskóli and Heppuskóli. Now, the three schools have been merged into one school called Grunnskóli Hornafjarðar. In the secondary school Framhaldsskólinn í Austur-Skaftafellssýslu 70 to 100 students study in the day school and over 100 students are under distance-study programmes. The school maintains close collaboration with other schools in Iceland, the College in Egilsstaðir and the Vocational School in Neskaupstaður. The school has modern teaching facilities such as wireless internet, a computer centre, availability of laptop computers for students, overhead projectors and built-in sound systems.

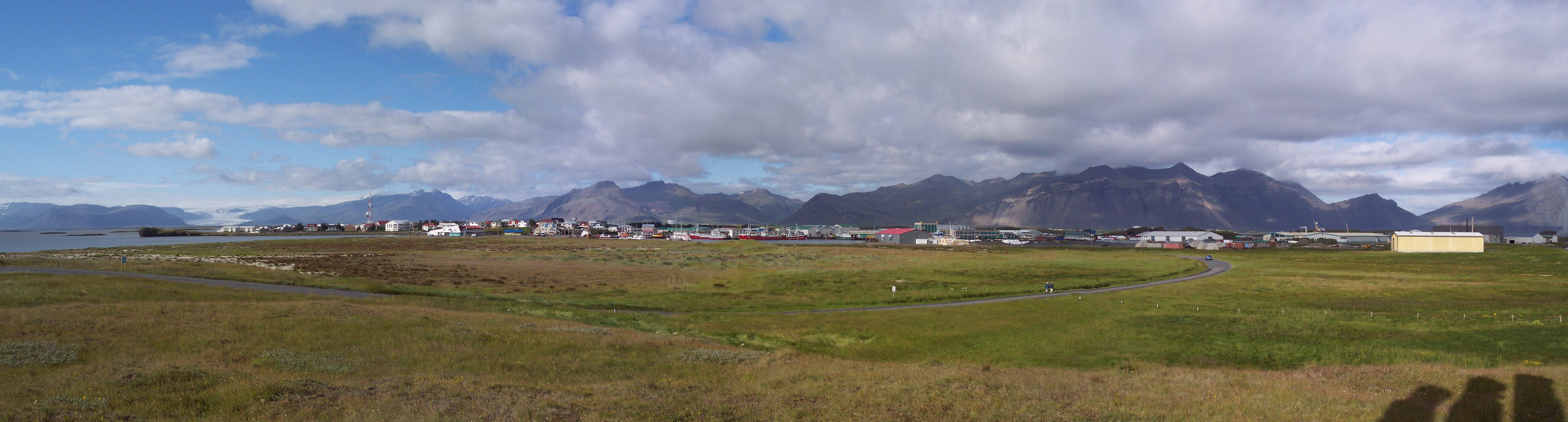
Höfn

== Infrastructure ==
Höfn offers a variety of services and stores including a supermarket, pharmacy, a health centre (Heilsugaeslustöð), a bank, three hairdressers, two gas stations, a golf course and a swimming pool. In the town there are several hotels, a camping ground, a youth hostel, guesthouses and restaurants including Pakkhúsið, Íshúsið Pizzeria, Heppa Restautant, Ottó, Kaffihornið, Ósinn and Hafnarbúðin. Various tour operators offer day trips including and flights to Vatnajökull.

In 2021, a geothermal district heating system was inaugurated in Höfn, using heat from boreholes from the Hoffell area, supplied by a 20km-long pipe. Previously the town sourced district heat from electric boilers, dating to the 1980s.

== Sports ==
The local football club is Sindri, which plays in the Icelandic 3rd tier.

== Climate ==
Höfn has a borderline subarctic climate (Köppen: Dfc), though it has likely become a subpolar oceanic climate (Koppen: Cfc) during the 1991-2020 climate period, because of climate change. Daytime highs in the summer are around 12 °C (54 °F), while being just above the freezing point in the winter. Höfn is a rainy town, averaging approximately 1,450 mm (57 in) of precipitation. On average, Höfn has 180 days with measurable precipitation. Extreme temperatures range from 24.4 °C (76 °F) recorded on August 10, 2004 to −21.6 °C (−7 °F) recorded on March 8, 1969.

Climate data for Höfn (1961-1990)
Month	Jan	Feb	Mar	Apr	May	Jun	Jul	Aug	Sep	Oct	Nov	Dec	Year
Record high °C (°F)	15.8 (60.4)	13.6 (56.5)	15.2 (59.4)	18.0 (64.4)	20.8 (69.4)	23.6 (74.5)	24.2 (75.6)	24.4 (75.9)	19.0 (66.2)	17.0 (62.6)	17.6 (63.7)	12.0 (53.6)	24.4 (75.9)
Mean daily maximum °C (°F)	2.5 (36.5)	2.9 (37.2)	3.5 (38.3)	5.7 (42.3)	8.5 (47.3)	11.0 (51.8)	12.6 (54.7)	12.2 (54.0)	9.9 (49.8)	7.0 (44.6)	3.7 (38.7)	2.7 (36.9)	6.8 (44.2)
Daily mean °C (°F)	0.1 (32.2)	0.7 (33.3)	1.0 (33.8)	3.1 (37.6)	6.0 (42.8)	8.6 (47.5)	10.2 (50.4)	9.8 (49.6)	7.5 (45.5)	4.8 (40.6)	1.5 (34.7)	0.0 (32.0)	4.4 (39.9)
Mean daily minimum °C (°F)	−2.5 (27.5)	−2.0 (28.4)	−1.8 (28.8)	0.3 (32.5)	3.2 (37.8)	6.1 (43.0)	7.7 (45.9)	7.3 (45.1)	4.7 (40.5)	2.2 (36.0)	−1.2 (29.8)	−2.7 (27.1)	1.8 (35.2)
Record low °C (°F)	−16.4 (2.5)	−17.4 (0.7)	−21.6 (−6.9)	−17.2 (1.0)	−8.2 (17.2)	−1.2 (29.8)	2.0 (35.6)	0.5 (32.9)	−3.4 (25.9)	−10.0 (14.0)	−12.2 (10.0)	−16.4 (2.5)	−21.6 (−6.9)
Average precipitation mm (inches)	164.2 (6.46)	130.2 (5.13)	121.2 (4.77)	94.8 (3.73)	95.7 (3.77)	88.8 (3.50)	84.4 (3.32)	110.7 (4.36)	119.0 (4.69)	183.1 (7.21)	116.8 (4.60)	145.9 (5.74)	1,452.6 (57.19)
Average precipitation days (≥ 0.1 mm)	17.1	14.1	15.5	12.9	12.7	13.8	14.9	15.4	15.3	17.3	14.0	16.1	179.3
Mean monthly sunshine hours	25.6	62.1	116.9	142.3	172.6	147.0	141.1	130.3	114.8	78.6	47.4	16.8	1,195.5
Source: Icelandic Met Office

== Transport ==
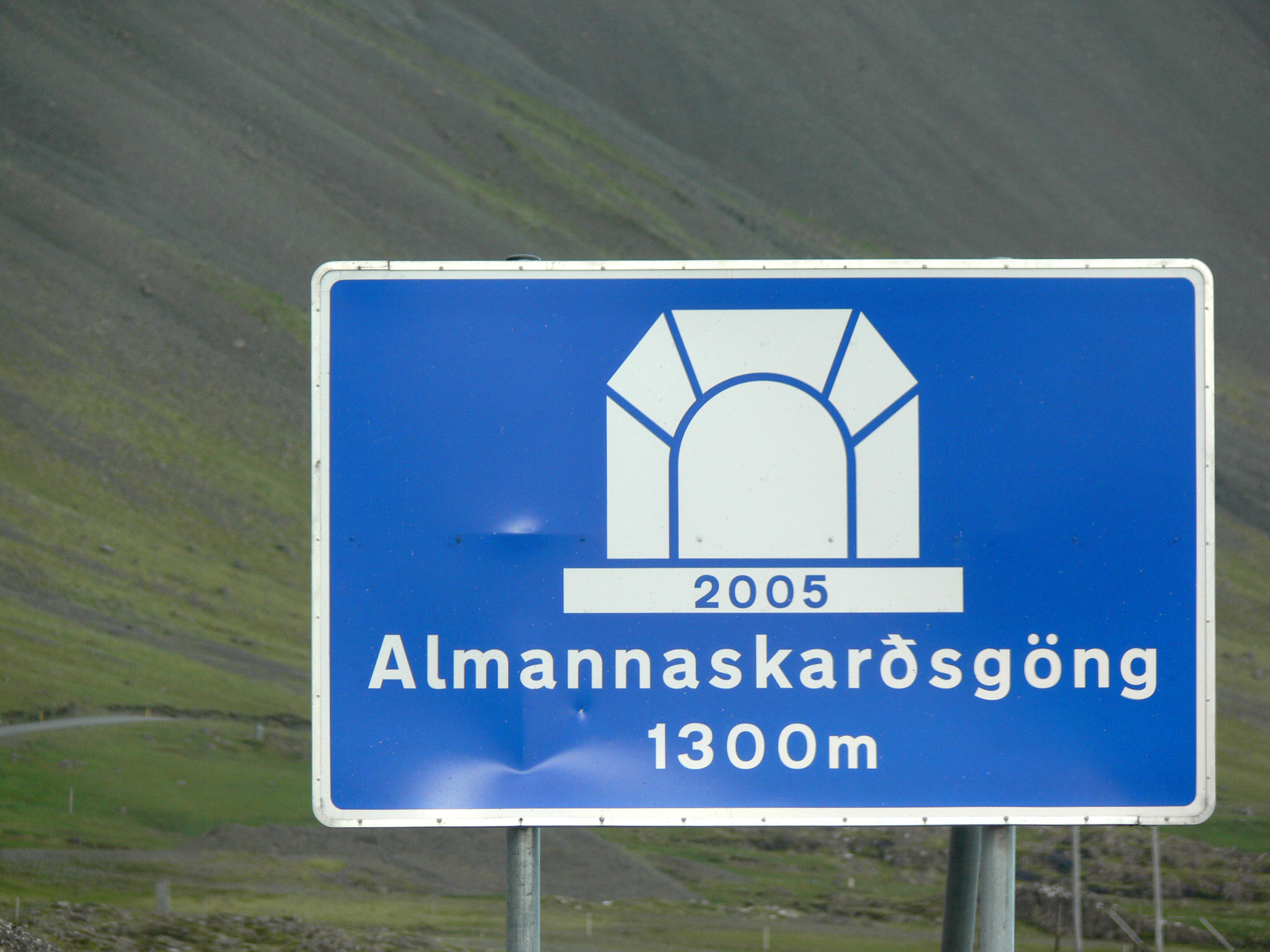
Almannaskarðsgöng

=== Road ===
Höfn lies on the Ring Road (Route 1), which encircles Iceland. The distance to Reykjavik is 455 km (283 mi). Immediately to the east of the town, there is the 1,312 metres (4,304 feet) long Almannaskarðsgöng tunnel opened in 2005, which has reduced winter closures over the previous mountain pass.

The town is a major centre for visitors to the Vatnajökull Glacier. Höfn lies at the end of Road 99, which leaves Iceland's National Road 1 several kilometres north of the town.

As of 2026, a major road improvement project is underway to reduce the distance towards Reykjavík with a new bridge across the Hornafjarðafljót river. The project will reduce the distance to the west by 12 km and is planned to be completed in 2026.

=== Air ===
Höfn airport, located 4 km from the town has regularly scheduled flights to Reykjavík.

=== Sea ===
Höfn is one of very few harbours in the southern part of Iceland and it needs to be navigated with care due to the changing pattern of shoals. Dredging is an essential requirement to remove sand that has accumulated near the harbour so that ships can safely moor. The entrance channel to Höfn port has a minimum depth of 6–7 metres (20–23 ft). However, the depth at the entrance itself is 7–8 metres (23–26 ft). The harbour at Höfn is reported to freeze during periods of extremely cold weather.
