= Svartifoss =

Waterfall and Iceland

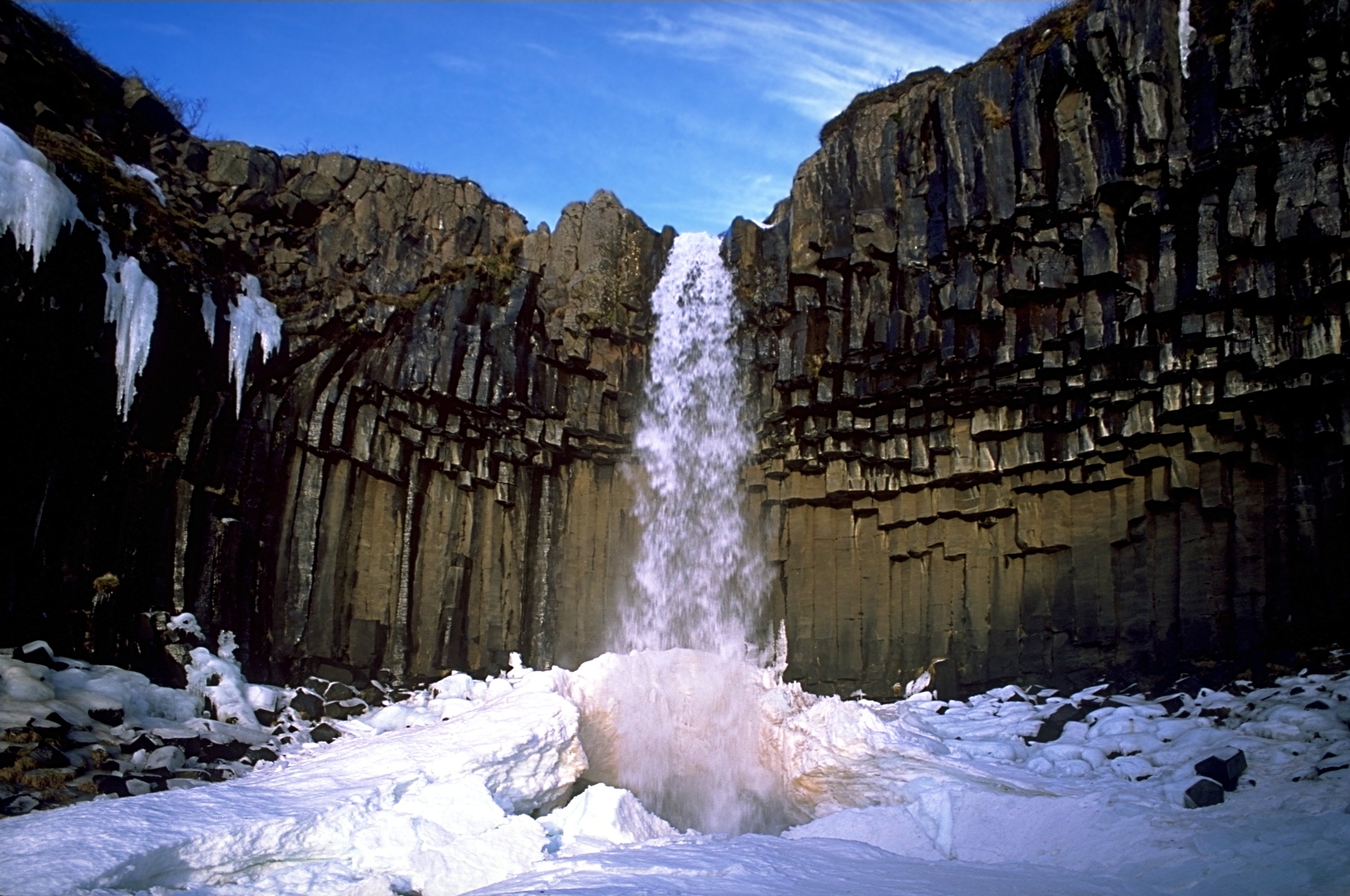

- Location within Iceland
- Location: South of Iceland
- Coordinates: 64.023°N 16.975°W
- Total height: 20 m (66 ft)
- Number of drops: 1

Svartifoss (Icelandic for "black waterfall", Icelandic pronunciation: [ˈsvar̥tɪˌfɔsː]) is a waterfall in Skaftafell in Vatnajökull National Park in Iceland, and is one of the most popular sights in the park. It is surrounded by dark lava columns, which gave rise to its name. The base of this waterfall is noteworthy for its sharp rocks. New hexagonal column sections break off faster than the falling water wears down the edges.

These basalt columns have provided inspiration for Icelandic architects, most visibly in the Hallgrímskirkja church in Reykjavík, and also the National Theatre.

== Geology ==
Svartifoss is renowned for its display of columnar-jointed basalt, forming a natural amphitheatre roughly 15–20 metres high and 30 metres wide on the southern edge of the Skaftafell plateau. The vertical faces of these mostly hexagonal columns are marked by regular horizontal grooves, or striations, spaced between 5 cm and 20 cm apart, which record successive stages of fracture propagation as the lava cooled and contracted. On the horizontal parting surfaces of individual columns, one often finds inscribed circular rings several millimetres in relief, accompanied by radiating hackle patterns; these features are thought to form during the final stages of cooling, when pressure gradients drive residual melt toward the column centre.

At the microscopic scale, the rock comprises interlocking networks of plagioclase crystals (laths) that preferentially align perpendicular to the long axis of the columns. This crystallographic fabric not only contributes to the strength and regularity of the columns but also gives rise to fine laminations—millimetre-scale layers visible on weathered surfaces—that cross-cut the larger striations. Together, these macro- and micro-morphological features provide clear evidence of the complex interplay between cooling rate, crystallisation and fracture mechanics during the formation of the Svartifoss colonnade.

== Gallery ==
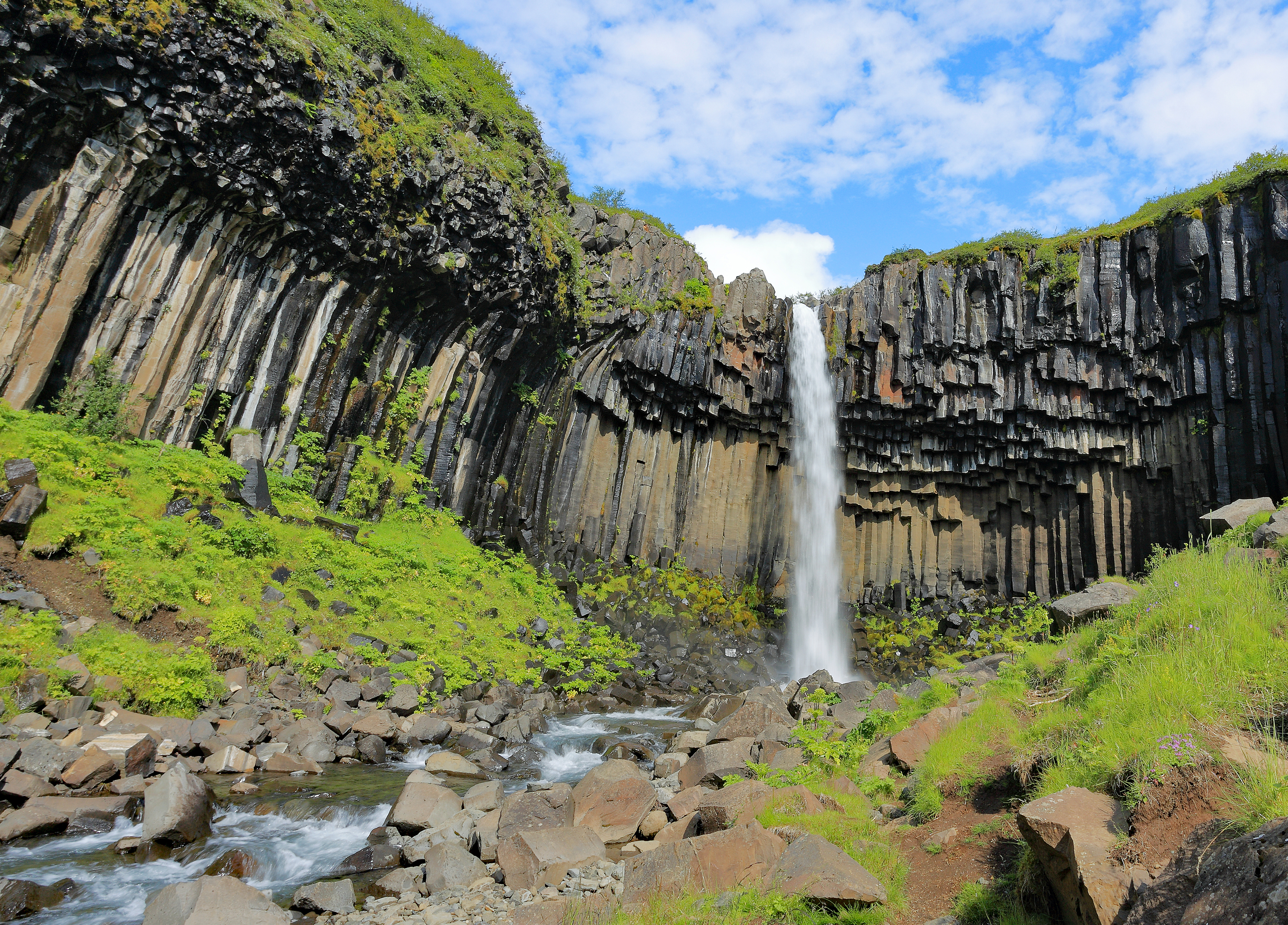
Svartifoss in summer

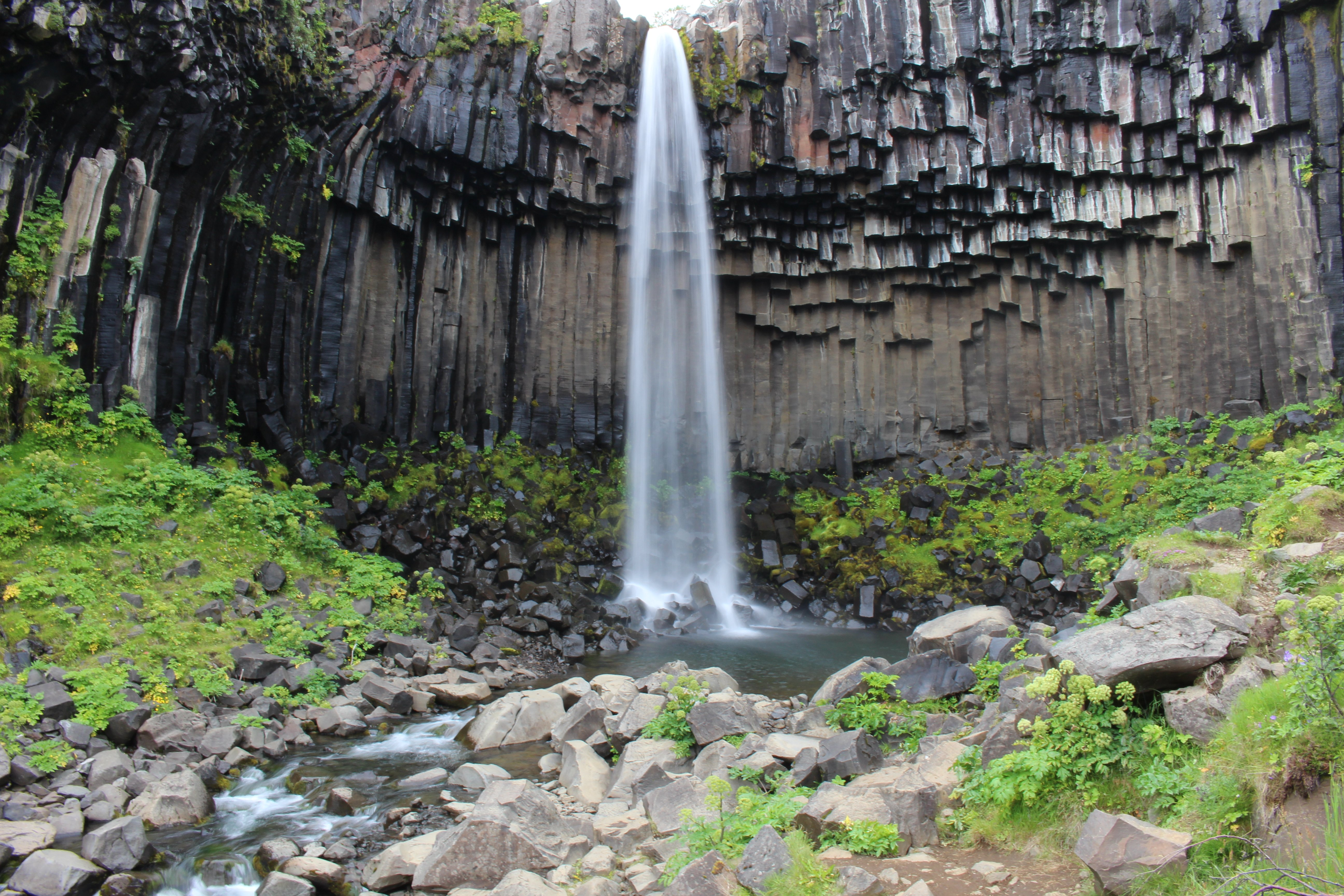
Bulb

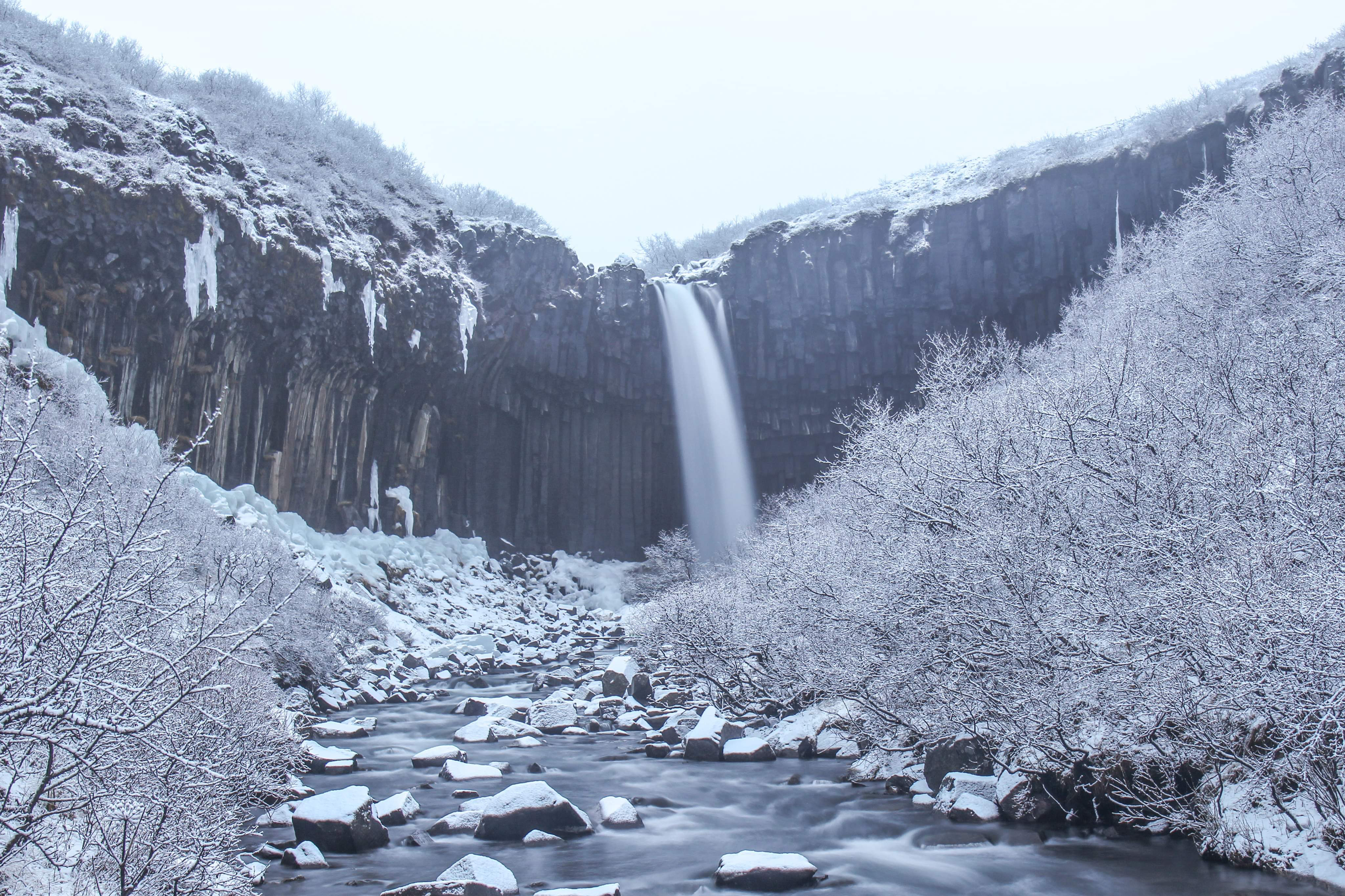
Long exposure photograph of the Svartifoss waterfall

== See also ==
- List of columnar basalts in Iceland
- List of waterfalls
- List of waterfalls in Iceland
