= Framhaldsskólinn í Austur-Skaftafellssýslu =

Location
- Nýheimar, Litlabrú 2 (Iceland) Höfn; Iceland
- Coordinates: 64°15′11″N 15°12′45″W

Information
- Established: August 1, 1987
- Principal: Eyjólfur Guðmundsson
- Staff: 23
- Enrollment: around 200
- Language: Icelandic
- Classrooms: 8
- Nickname: FAS
- Website: http://www.fas.is

Framhaldsskólinn í Austur-Skaftafellssýslu (often abbreviated FAS) is a secondary school located in Höfn, southeast Iceland. It was founded in 1987 by the Icelandic government and municipalities in Austur-Skaftafellssýsla. The first 15 years, it was located in Nesjaskóli, in Nes, a nearby rural area, but was moved to a new building, Nýheimar, in 2002. The school has about 200 students, mostly locals, but distance education is also quite common. Current principal is Eyjólfur Guðmundsson.
