= Lómagnúpur =

Mountain

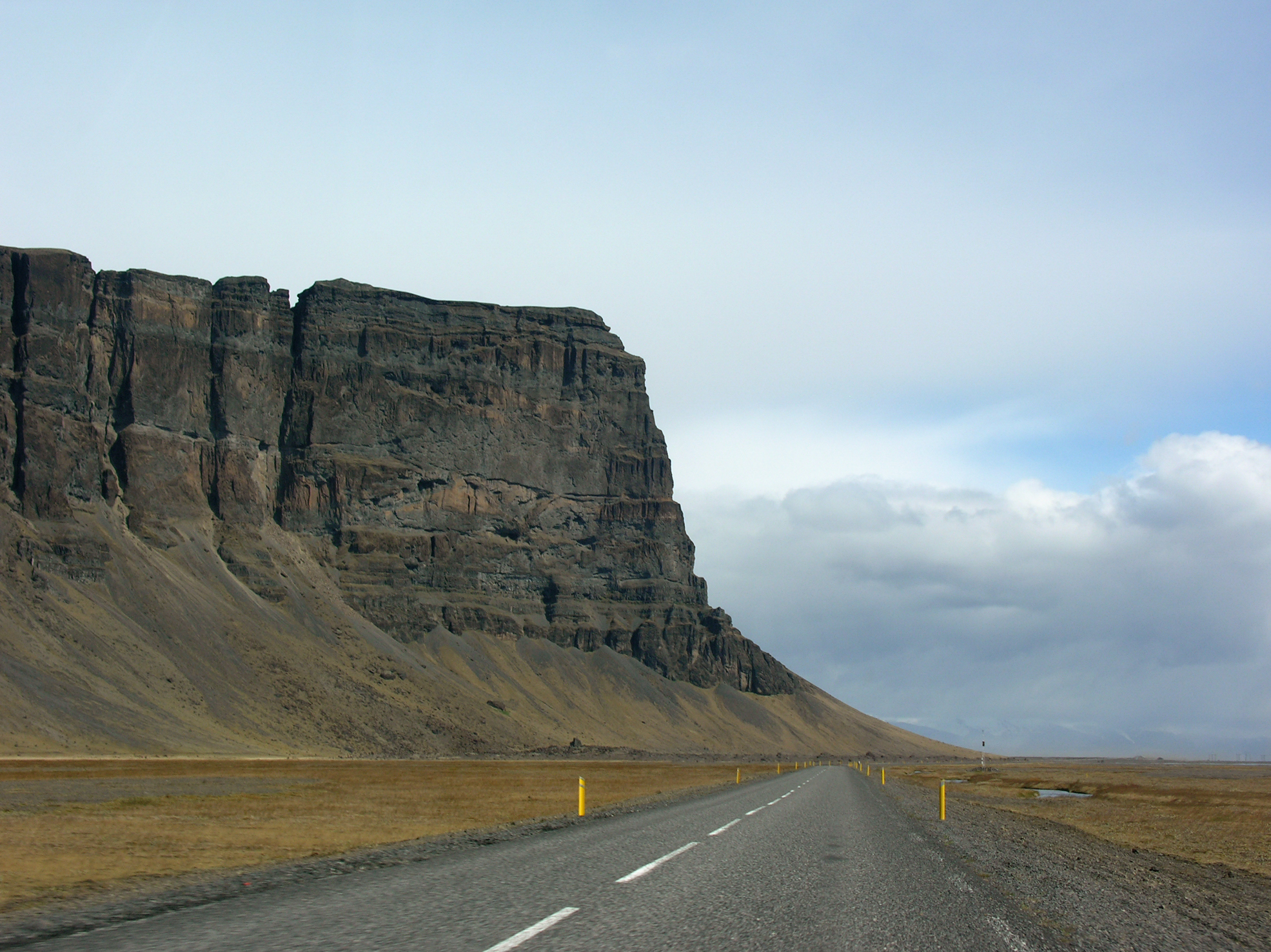
- Lómagnúpur with the landslide of 1789 and Route 1

Highest point
- Elevation: 764 m (2,507 ft)
- Coordinates: 63°58′00″N 17°31′00″W

Geography
- Location within Iceland
- Location: Skeiðarársandur, Southern Region, Iceland

Geology
- Mountain type: Subglacial mound

Lómagnúpur (Icelandic pronunciation: [ˈlouːmaˌknuːpʏr̥]; 764 m (2,507 ft)) is a subglacial mound in southern Iceland.

== Location ==
The mountain lies in the far east of Fljótshverfi district and borders directly on Skeiðarársandur. East of it on the Sander is the Núpsvötn river. South of it is Route 1. With the bridge construction in the east of the mountain, the ring road was closed in 1974.

== Geology ==
It is a long, north–south oriented ridge at its highest peak 764m above sea level, while the foremost cliffs reach a (almost vertical) height of 671m and are thus the highest in Iceland.

Most of Lómagnúpur is made of palagonite, but there are also layers of lava (e.g. pillow lava and lava columns) and sediments. It was built up within a million years. The lowest layers are about 2.5 million years old, the highest ones about 1.5 million. In addition, the mountain was in interglacial times and directly on the coast immediately after the last ice age 10,000 years ago, so that the sea also left its mark on it.

Two or three landslides can be detected at Lómagnúpur. The most striking one is located on the west side of the mountain next to Route 1, built in 1789 during an earthquake.

== Culture ==
The mountain became famous in the Njáll saga, in which Flosi has a nightmare. He had killed Njáll with his men and now dreamt of a giant coming out of the mountain and announcing the death of his people.

This famous scene is alluded to in a poem about Lómagnúpur by lyricist Jón Helgason, also known in Iceland.

== See also ==
- Geography of Iceland
