= Kristínartindar =

Mountain in Vatnajökull National Park, Iceland

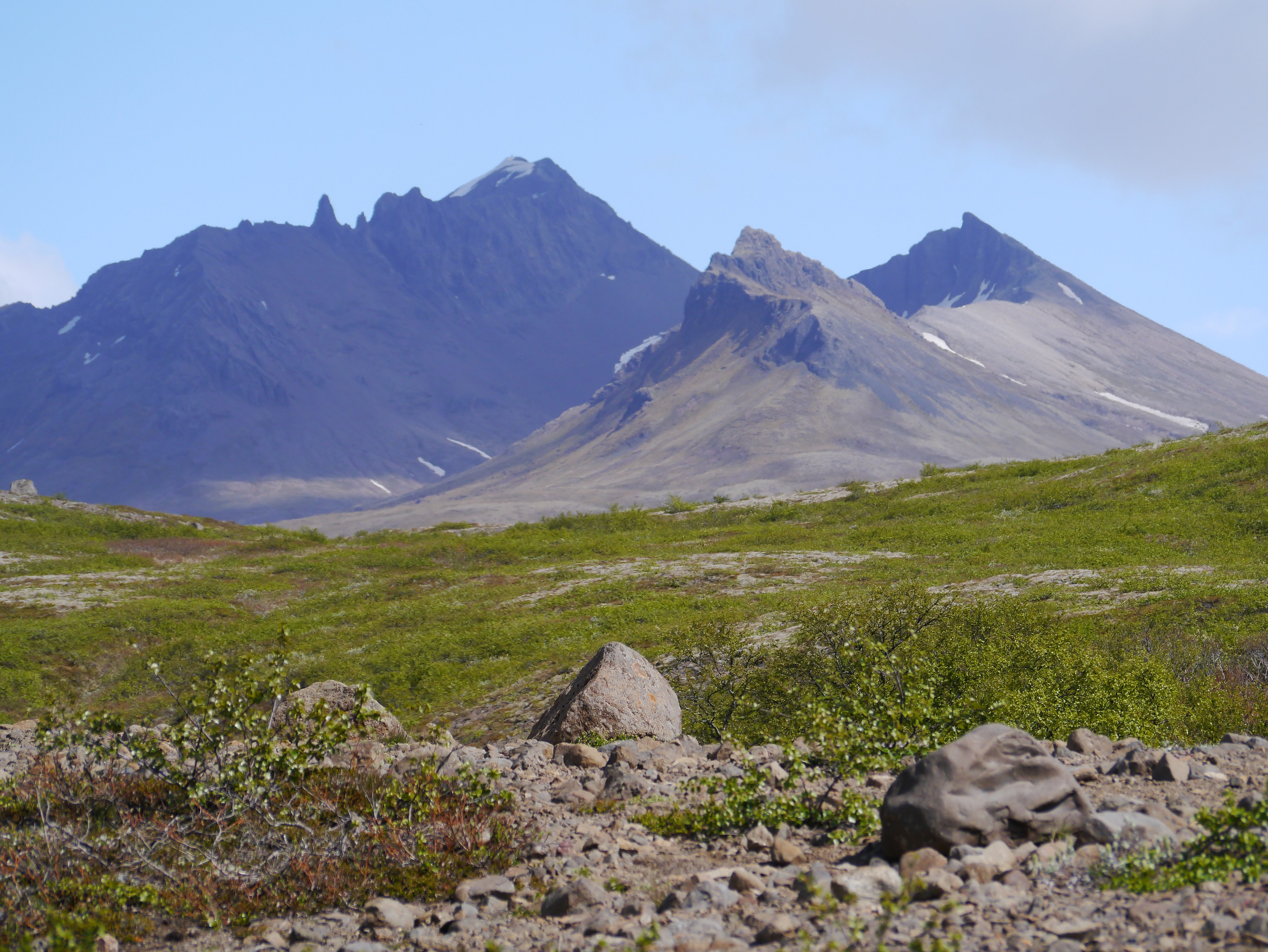

Highest point
- Elevation: 1,126 m
- Coordinates: 64°04′07.8″N 16°55′29.1″W

Geography

Kristínartindar is a mountain in Vatnajökull National Park, Iceland. It has a height of 1,126 m above sea level and its knife-edge summit straddles two glacier valleys. On a clear day, Iceland's tallest waterfall, Morsárfoss, is visible from the summit. During the summer months, a trail allows experienced hikers to ascend the mountain from the park's visitor centre. Trail S4 is a circular route of 17,9 km with an elevation gain of 1215 m.
