= Skeiðará =

River in Iceland

Coordinates: 63°47′N 16°56′W

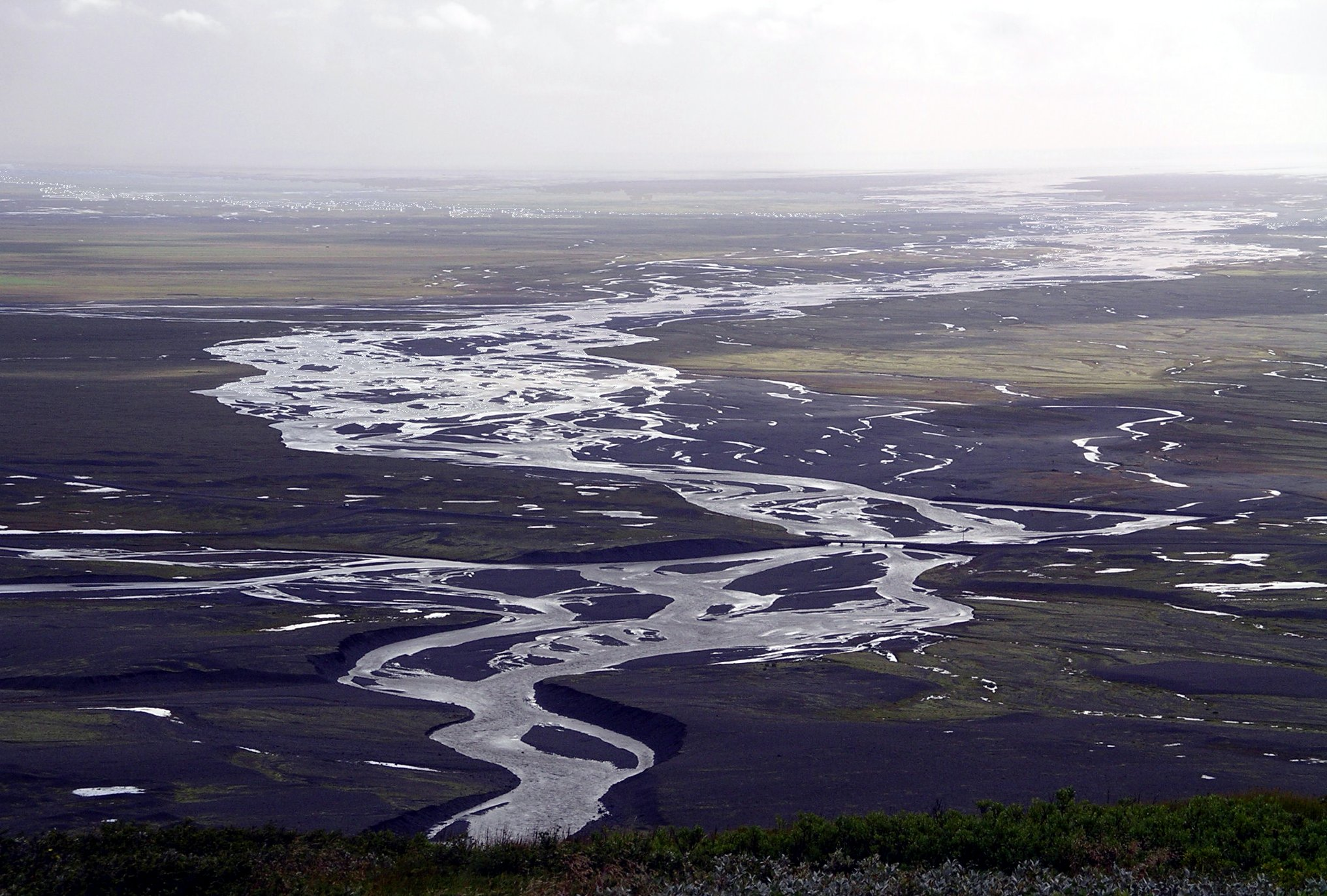
Skeidará Sandur from Skaftafell

Skeiðará (Icelandic pronunciation: [ˈsceiːðarˌauː]) is a relatively short glacier river (about 30 km long). It has its source on the glacier Skeiðarárjökull, one of the southern arms of the Vatnajökull in the south of Iceland.

In spite of its short length, this river has a bad reputation. It is especially feared because of the frequent glacier runs that can be fatal.

In front of Skaftafell and Skeiðarárjökull, Skeiðará has formed the Skeiðarársandur, a black plain of lava sand and ashes crossed by a lot of small rivulets which covers the whole area between the park and the sea (about 40 km long and 5 to 10 km wide). In 1996, the latest of these glacier runs took place. It destroyed parts of Route 1 (the Ring Road). The 880-metre-long (2,890 ft) bridge was damaged by floating ice boulders the size of houses. At the peak of this glacier run, 45,000 m^{3}/s of water were coming down. No one was harmed, scientists having very carefully monitored the volcano Grímsvötn on Vatnajökull which caused the glacier run by its eruption.

== See also ==
- List of rivers of Iceland
