= Skeiðarársandur =

Icelandic glacial outwash plain

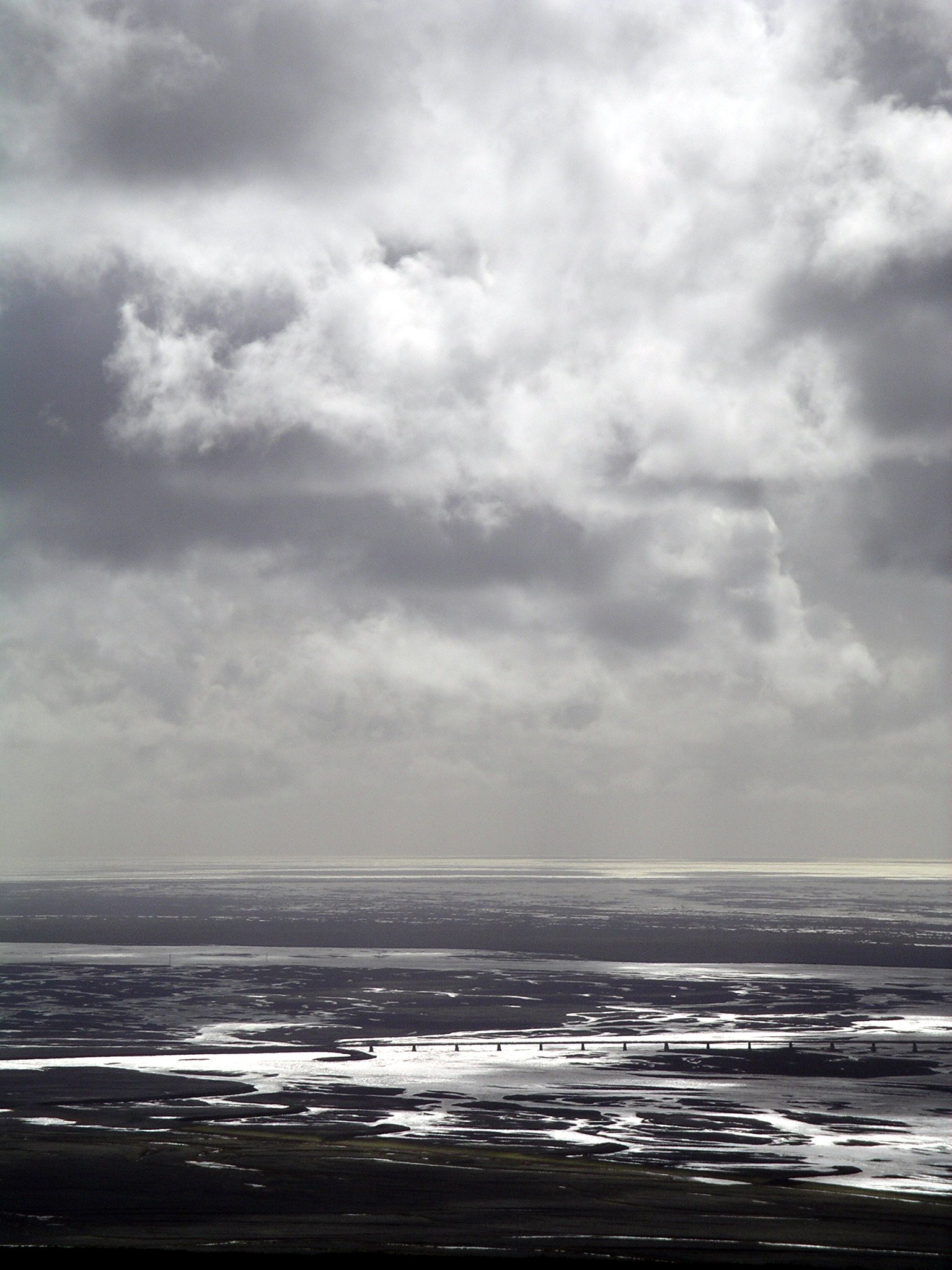
View over Skeiðarársandur

Skeiðarársandur (Icelandic pronunciation: [ˈsceiːðarˌauːrˌsantʏr̥]) is an Icelandic glacial outwash plain, a vast expanse of sand generated by the transport of debris by the Skeiðará and other rivers, whose flow is generated by the Skeiðarárjökull glacier and fed by the volcanic systems of Grímsvötn and Öræfajökull.

The coastline of the Sandur is 56 km long (from Hvalsík to Hnappavallaós). From Skeiðarárjökull—the valley glacier of Vatnajökull—to the sea is 20 to 30 km.

The Skeiðará was the most important obstacle in the construction of Iceland's Route 1. It was not until 1974 that it could be completely closed by a 904 m long bridge. This is currently the longest bridge in Iceland. It was temporarily destroyed by water masses and blocks of ice during the last major glacial outburst flood in 1996, triggered by an eruption of the Grímsvötn volcano, but was immediately restored.

The outwash plain originated primarily as alluvial land, i.e. as an accumulation of sediments from the rivers. The sediments deposited here in the Holocene alone range from 100 to 200 km^{3}. However, volcanic eruptions of the volcanic systems of Grímsvötn and Öræfajökull have added to these sediment deposits. The sediments are carried during glacial floods with the glacier water, which thaws during volcanic eruptions, but also through ash deposits.

The outwash plain does not consist entirely of modern sediments. For example, there is also a cliff. In addition, through seismological experiments geologists discovered a 100–150 m deep valley in the bedrock below the modern sediment layers, which was probably milled out by glacial rivers of the Ice Age. Over the last 10,000 years, the outwash plain has grown at a speed of about 1 km^{3}/century.

On 19 September 1667, the Dutch merchant vessel Het Wapen van Amsterdam stranded in Skeiðarársandur. Commonly known as Gullskipið (English: The Goldship) in Iceland due to beliefs that it was carrying a large amount of gold and diamonds, several expeditions have been made to find the wreckage to no avail.

== See also ==
- Geography of Iceland
- List of volcanoes in Iceland
