= Hornafjörður (municipality) =

- Municipality
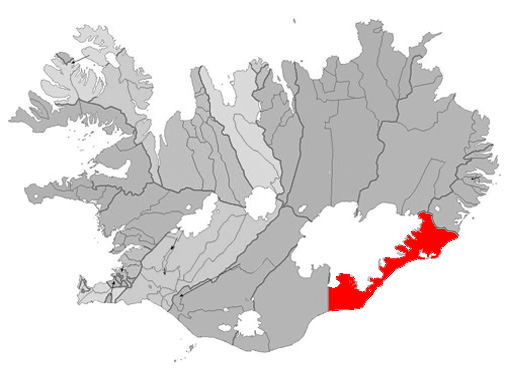
- Location of Hornafjörður

- Location within Iceland
- Coordinates: 64.2951°N 15.2283°W
- Country: Iceland
- Region: Southern Region
- Constituency: South Constituency
- Established: 6 June 1998

Government
  - Manager: Sigurjón Andrésson

Area
  - Total: 6,309 km^{2} (2,436 sq mi)

Population (2025)
  - Total: 2,589
  - Density: 0.41/km^{2} (1.1/sq mi)
- Postal code(s): 780, 781, 785
- Municipal number: 8401
- Website: hornafjordur.is

Hornafjörður (official name: Sveitarfélagið Hornafjörður) is a municipality in the Suðurland region of Iceland. Until 1999, it was part of Austurland region.

The municipality was created on 6 June 1998 through the merger of the municipalities Hornafjarðarbær, Bæjarhreppur, Borgarhafnarhreppur, and Hofshreppur.
