= Hoffell =

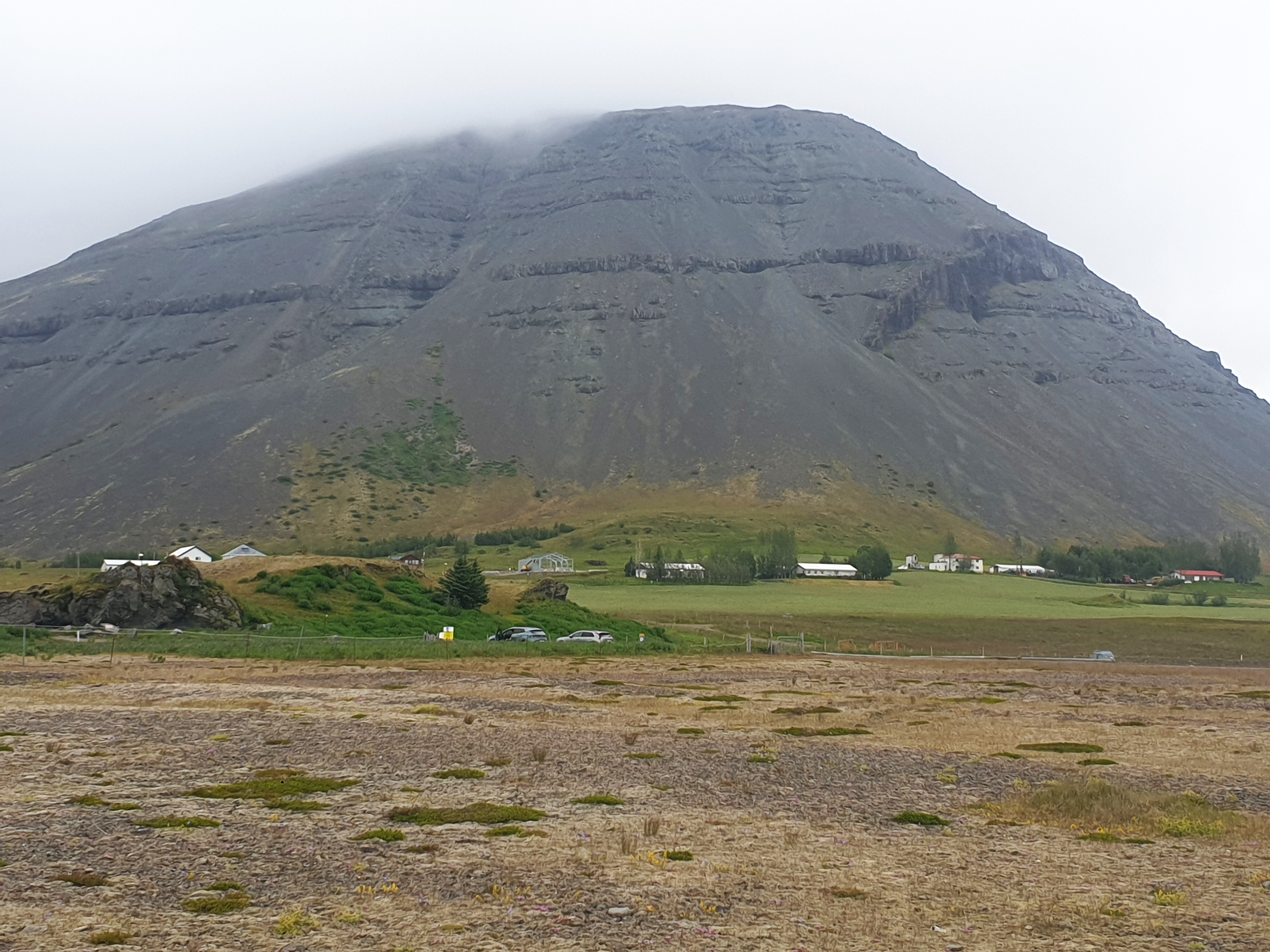

- Location of Hoffell in Iceland
- Coordinates: 64°22′N 15°19′W
- Country: Iceland
- Constituency: South Constituency
- Region: Eastern Region
- Municipality: Sveitarfélagið Hornafjörður
- Time zone: UTC+0 (GMT)

Hoffell (Icelandic pronunciation: [ˈhɔfːɛtl̥]) is an area and a farmland in southeast Iceland. It is characterised by a large outlet glacier, Hoffellsjökull, and gabbro rock, which originally formed deep in the Earth's crust but is now visible due to uplift of the area and glacial erosion. The Hoffell area is 15 kilometres from the town of Höfn. A guesthouse is located in the area with naturally heated outdoor hot tubs. Marked hiking trails are also to be found in the area.

== Conservation ==
The Hoffell area is protected as an area with sustainable use of natural resources (IUCN category VI). It has been a part of Vatnajökull National Park since the park's establishment in 2008. The object of the area's conservation is to protect the habitat of several rare lichens with rare dispersion, and a few rare vascular plants. The area is also conserved for outdoor recreation.

== Geology ==
Hoffellsjökull outlet glacier has cut through a central volcano which is named after Geitafell mountain. Geitafell volcano was active 5–6 million years ago. Mostly consisting of tholeiite basalt with minor amounts of hyaloclastite and rhyolite, the total thickness of the strata from this volcano is estimated to be 2,700 m. There are indications that Geitafell was a high mountain, possibly ice-capped even before the Ice Age. Glaciers have eroded this volcano, but signs of a huge caldera can still be seen in nearby mountains.

The Geitafellsbjörg cliffs, east of Hoffellsjökull, are formed by an intrusion, mostly consisting of gabbro. Gabbro is a plutonic rock with the same chemical composition as basalt. Gabbro solidifies deep in the crust where it cools slowly, allowing large crystals to develop. This makes it coarser, harder and more resistant to weathering. Gabbro from a quarry at Geitafellstangi, on the edge of Geitafellsbjörg, has been used as cladding for the Central Bank of Iceland building in Reykjavík.

Iceland spar, a variety of clear calcite, occurs in Hoffellsfjöll mountains. An object viewed through Iceland spar appears as two because of double refraction. Iceland spar was much used in optical instruments until replaced by synthetic material.

In December 1910, the Hoffell farmer, Guðmundur Jónsson, was looking for sheep in Hoffellsdalur valley when he found a large number of Iceland spar fragments in a gorge on the mountainside. Along with a Reykjavík merchant, he started mining and exporting Iceland spar to countries like Denmark and Germany, where it was used in microscopes and other optical instruments. It was also used to decorate buildings in Reykjavík, where it can still be seen in the domed ceiling just inside the entrance of the main building of the University of Iceland, and in the altar of the University chapel. Production in the mine ceased in 1940.

== Plants ==
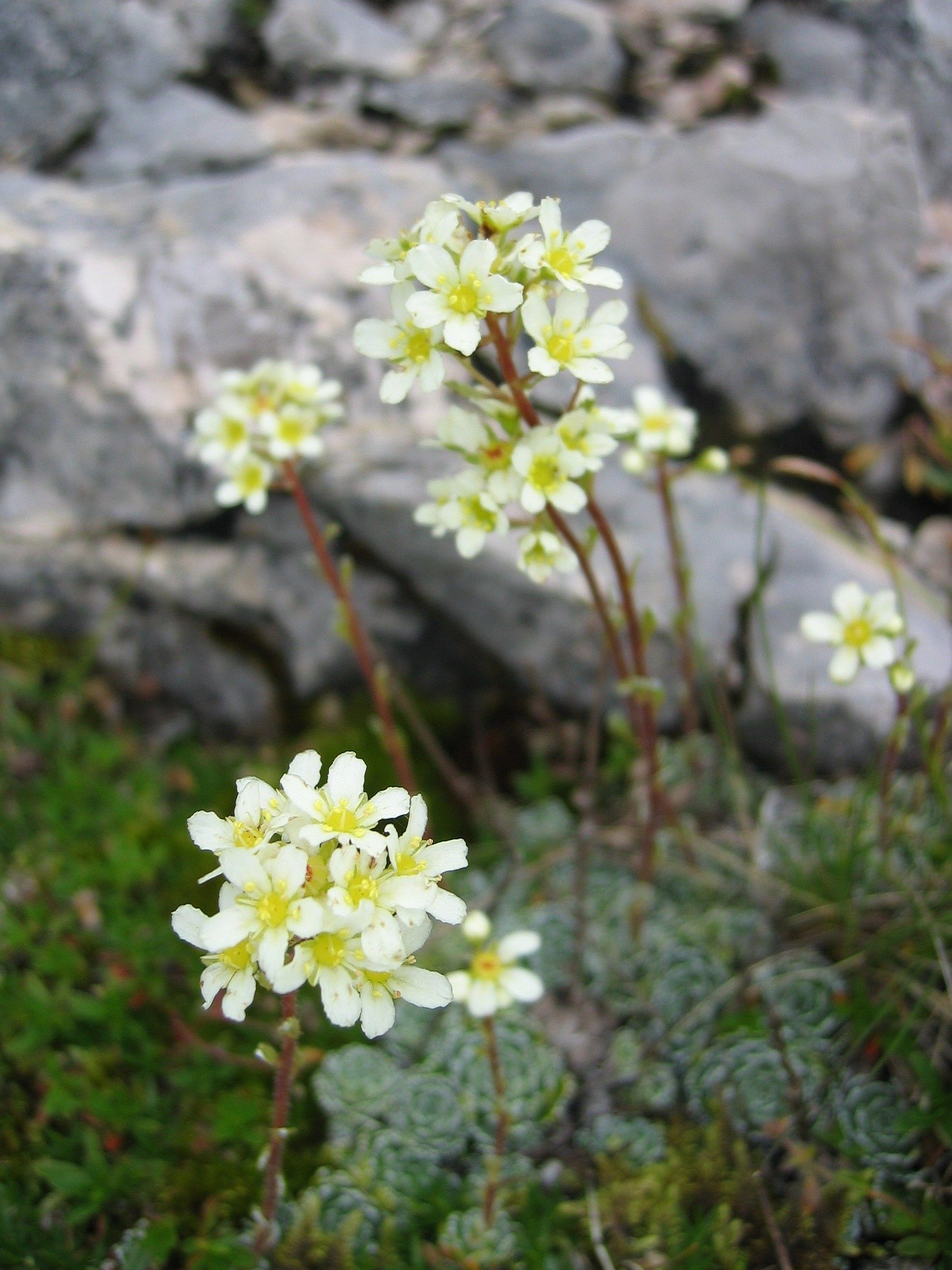
Silver saxifrage.

The mountain area east of Hoffellsjökull is the habitat of several rare plants. Silver saxifrage and green spleenwort grow in the cliffs, while the lichens Bryoria fuscescens, Bryoria simplicior, Hypogymnia tubulos, Vulpicida pinastri and Platismatia glauca inhabit the birch woods and shrubby areas.

Green spleenwort, has pinnate leaves with a green midrib which distinguishes it from the maidenhair spleenwort. The low-growing green spleenwort is mostly found in south-facing rock crevices. Originally, it was only believed to exist in southeast Iceland, but has now been identified widely in east Iceland and north of Lake Mývatn.

Silver saxifrage resembles pyramidal saxifrage but is much smaller and has fewer flowers. These are grouped together at the tip of the stem, five-petalled and white, while the stem grows out of a dense rosette of ligulate, white-toothed basal leaves. Silver saxifrage grows in rock fissures and occurs only in areas of Tertiary basalt lavas, which are mostly located in the east of Iceland, but also in the west and northwest.

== Wildlife ==
Arctic foxes, field mice and reindeer live in the Hoffellsfjöll area, along with a great variety of birds. Commonly sighted perching birds include:

- Redpolls (Carduelis flammea);
- Redwings (Turdus iliacus);
- Snow buntings (Plectrophenax nivalis);
- Common ravens (Corvus corax);
- Northern wheatears (Oenanthe oenanthe);
- Eurasian wrens (Troglodytes troglodytes); and
- White wagtails (Motacilla alba).

Other birds often spotted are:

- Ptarmigans (Lagopus mutus);
- Golden plovers (Pluvialis apricaria);
- Greylag geese (Anser anser); and
- Northern fulmars (Fulmaris glacialis).

Walrus teeth and sea urchins have been found on the gravel flats below Hoffellsjökull. The walrus teeth have been dated at 7,000 years old, indicating that at the end of the last glaciation, the sea extended into a fjord where Hoffellsjökull lies now.
