= Langisjór =

Lake in Iceland

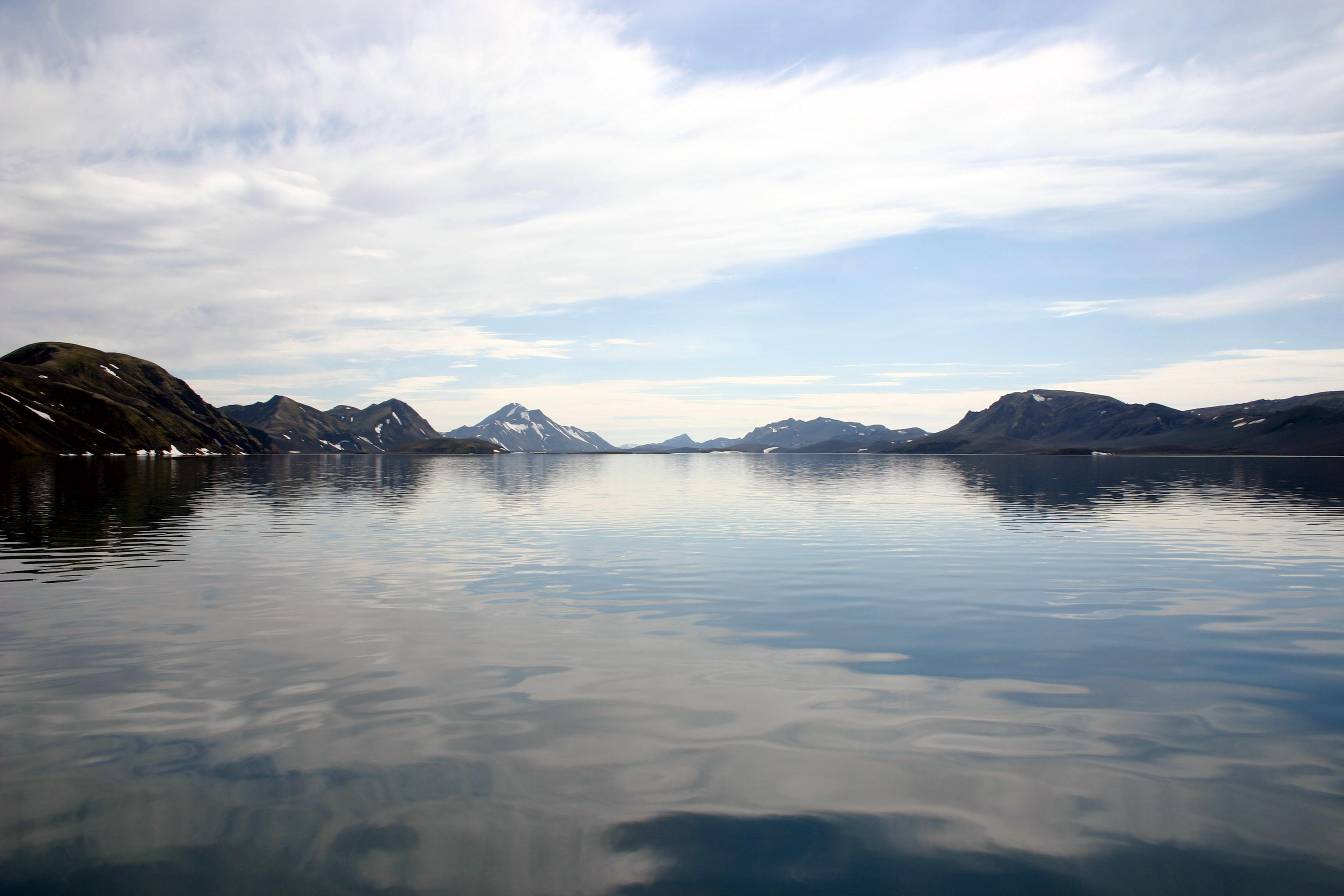
- in summer

- Location within Iceland
- Coordinates: 64°11′N 18°15′W
- Basin countries: Iceland
- Max. length: 20 km (12 mi)
- Max. width: 2 km (1.2 mi)
- Surface area: 26 km^{2} (10 sq mi)
- Max. depth: 75 m (246 ft)
- Surface elevation: 670 m (2,200 ft)

Langisjór (Icelandic pronunciation: [ˈlauɲcɪˌsjouːr̥]) is a lake in the western part of Vatnajökull National Park, Iceland. It is around 20 km in length and up to 2 km wide, with a total surface area of about 26 km^{2} (10 sq mi) and a depth of 75m at its deepest point.

The lake is situated rather far from civilisation at the south-western border of Vatnajökull at an altitude of 670 m above sea level. Environmental campaigners have expressed concern at government plans to site an industrial dam on the lake.

== See also ==
- List of lakes of Iceland
