= Öræfajökull =

Volcano in south-eastern Iceland

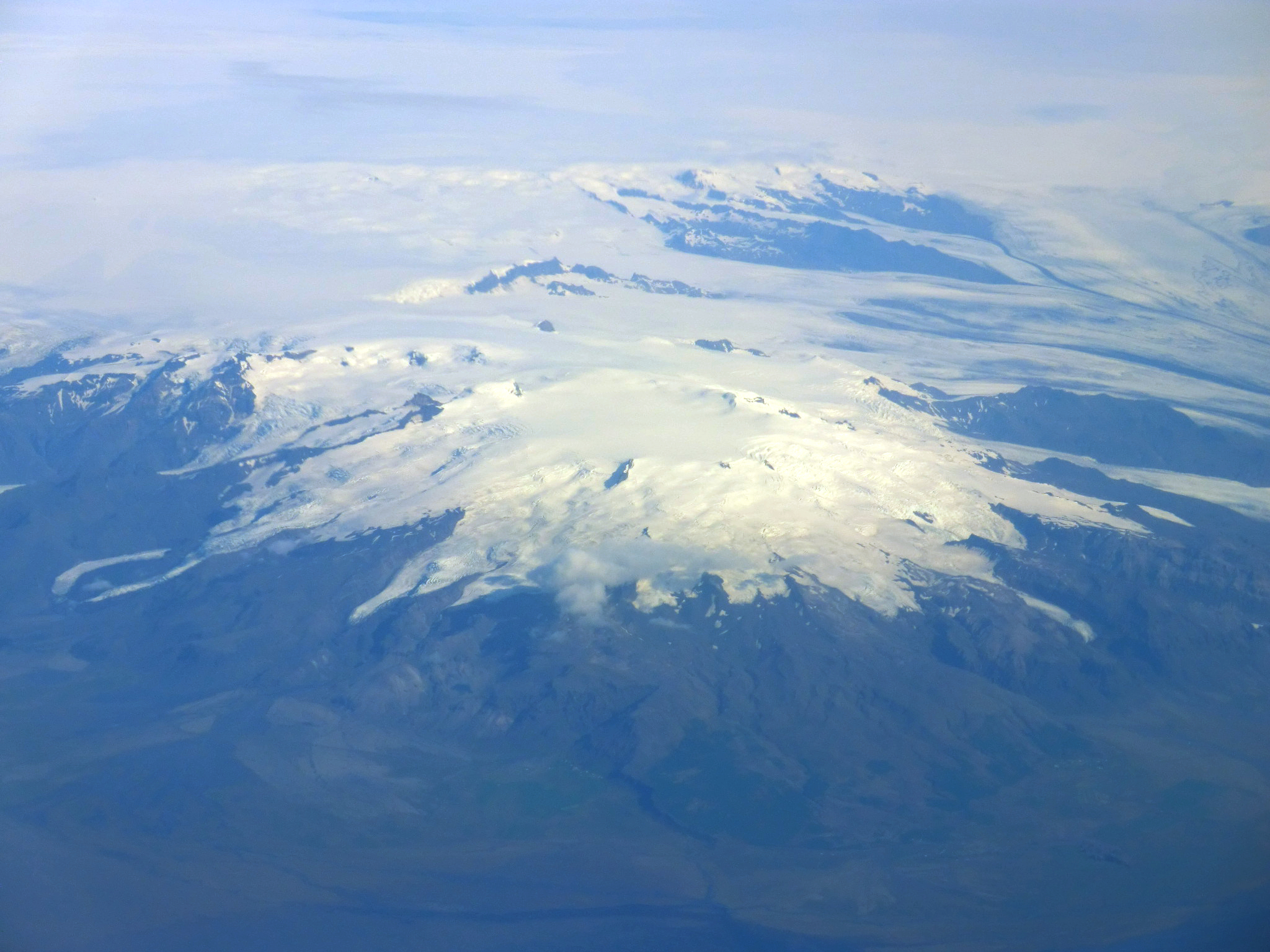

Highest point
- Elevation: 2,109.6 metres (6,921 ft) at Hvannadalshnúkur
- Prominence: 2,109.6 metres (6,921 ft) at Hvannadalshnúkur
- Coordinates: 64°00′N 16°39′W

Dimensions
- Area: 400 km^{2} (150 sq mi)
- Volume: 300 km^{3} (72 cu mi)

Geography
- Location: Iceland

Geology
- Rock age: Pleistocene
- Mountain type: Stratovolcano
- Last eruption: 3 August 1727 to May 1728
- Topographic features of Öræfajökull. The approximate outline of the central volcano is outlined in red with caldera features in red shading. White/blue shading show glacier features relevant to jökulhlaup risk. The peak Hvannadalshnúkur has a marker. More detail or zoom out to show other volcanoes in the Öræfi volcanic belt (brown shading) is available on clicking the image to enable mouse-over.

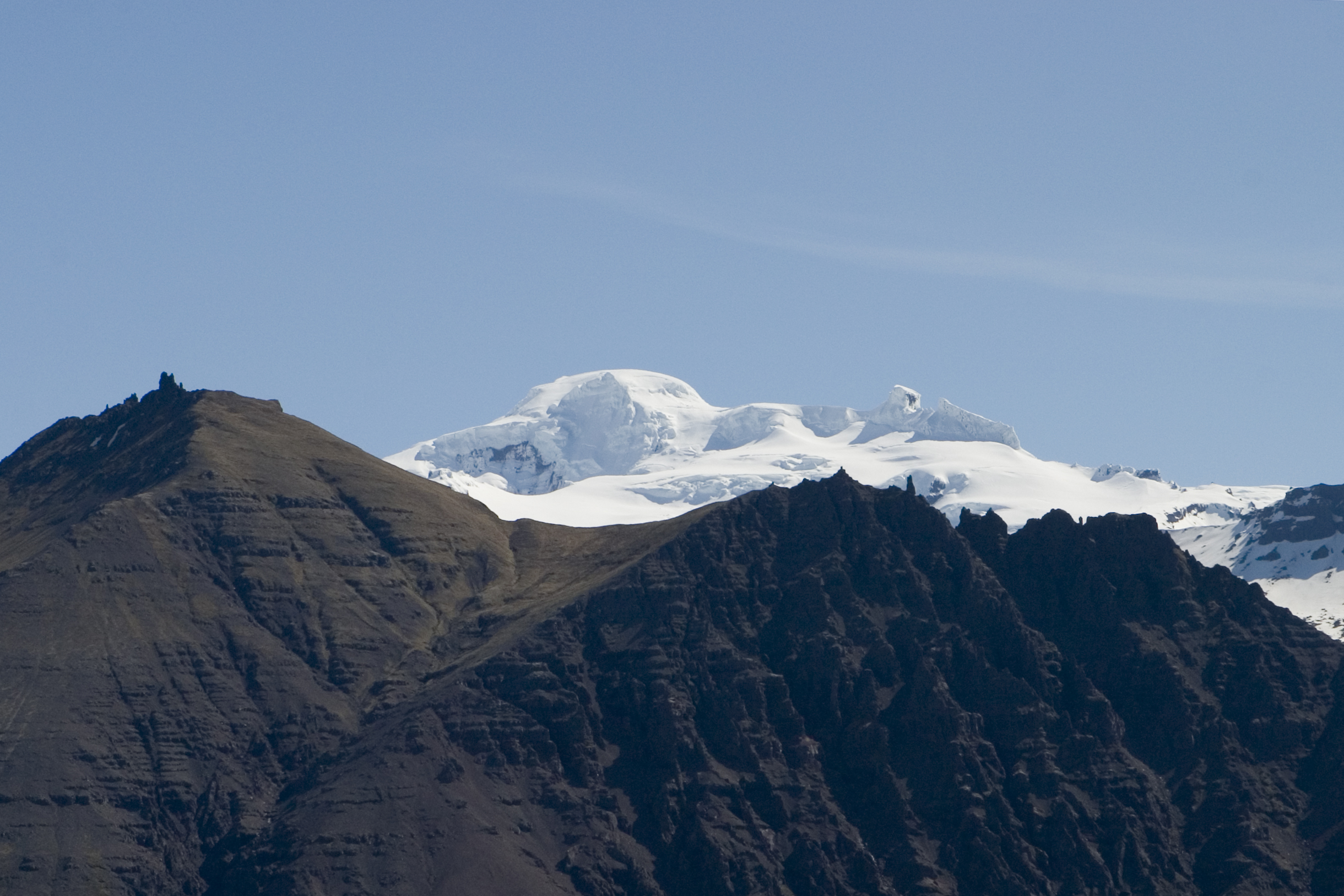
Hvannadalshnúkur, the highest peak of Öræfajökull.

Öræfajökull (Icelandic pronunciation: [ˈœːrˌaiːvaˌjœːkʏtl̥]; 'Öræfi glacier' or 'wasteland glacier') is an ice-covered volcano in south-east Iceland. The largest active volcano and the highest peak in Iceland at 2,110 metres (6,920 ft), it lies within the Vatnajökull National Park and is covered by part of the glacier.

The original Norse settlers named the volcano Knappafellsjǫkull (Old Norse: [ˈknɑpːɑˌfelːsˌjɔkolː]; Modern Icelandic: Hnappafellsjökull [ˈn̥ahpaˌfɛlsˌjœːkʏtl̥]; 'knobs mountain glacier'). The current name, Öræfajökull, was eventually adopted after the 1362 eruption.

== Description ==
Öræfajökull is located at the southern extremity of the Vatnajökull glacier and overlooking the Ring Road between Höfn and Vík. It is the largest active volcano in the country, and on the summit crater's north-western rim is Hvannadalshnúkur, the highest peak in Iceland at 2,110 metres (6,920 ft).

Geographically, Öræfajökull as the glacier, is considered part of Vatnajökull, and the area covered by glacier is within the boundary of Vatnajökull National Park. There are a number of outlet glaciers in the ice cap within the area of the central volcano which clockwise from north are: Breiðamerkurjökull, Fjallsjökull, Hrútárjökull, Bræðrajökull, Kviarjökull, Hólárjökull, Stórhöfðajökull, Gljúfursárjökull, Rótarfjallsjökull (which has a western branch called Kotárjökull), Grænafjallsjökull, Falljökull, Virkisjökull, Svinafellsjökull and Skaftafellsjökull. While most of the outlet glaciers have reasonably clear catchments, not all do. Some of the icecap feeds directly into river catchments without a named glacier and this happens between the Hrútárjökull and Bræðrajökull, and the Virkisá river drains a number of glaciers between Rótarfjallsjökull and Svinafellsjökull (see map on this page).

The summit caldera of this stratovolcano is 3 km × 4 km (1.9 mi × 2.5 mi) and the volcano is 20 km (12 mi) in diameter. It is the most southern of the volcanoes in the Öræfi volcanic belt (Öræfajökull volcanic belt), which is possibly an embryonic rift parallel and to the east of the Eastern volcanic zone. The presently active summit caldera may have a subcaldera within it. Eruptions in this area are most likely to result in jökulhlaups that will produce floods at the outlets of the Kviarjökull and Virkisá catchments as these overlap the present caldera. There is possibly an old caldera to the north of the current caldera and flank eruptions could produce jökulhlaup from other outlet glaciers. The topographical map on this page can be enlarged to show this detail.

== Activity ==
Öræfajökull has erupted twice in historical times, in 1362 and 1728. These were explosive silicic eruptions with bulk tephra volumes of 0.1–10.0 km^{3} (0.024–2.399 cu mi) and jökulhlaups occurred. The deposits closer to the central volcano are rhyolytic but the more distal lava flows which can extend for 20 km (12 mi) from the caldera are alkali olivine basalt and both have been erupted in the Holocene.

=== 1362 eruption ===
In 1362, Knappafellsjökull erupted explosively, ejecting 10 cubic kilometres of tephra, similar in scale to the 1991 eruption of Mount Pinatubo. The eruption sequence lasted for several months, being from a medium-potassium alkali rhyolite and has been assigned a VEI of 6 although dense-rock equivalent volume may be less than previous estimates at 1.2 km^{3} (0.29 cu mi). The wealthy district of Litlahérað was destroyed by floods, pyroclastic flows and ashfall. Sailors reported pumice “in such masses that ships could hardly make their way through it.” Thick volcanic deposits obliterated farmland, and ash travelled as far as western Europe. Forty farms were destroyed. More than 40 years passed before people again settled the area, which became known as Öræfi. The name literally means 'an area without harbour,' but it took on a meaning of 'wasteland' in Icelandic, as the 1362 eruption had drastically altered the environment around the mountain. The volcano likewise took on the new name Öræfajökull.

=== 1728 eruption ===
An eruption in August 1727–1728 was smaller than 1362, though floods are known to have caused three fatalities when the meltwater swept their farm away.

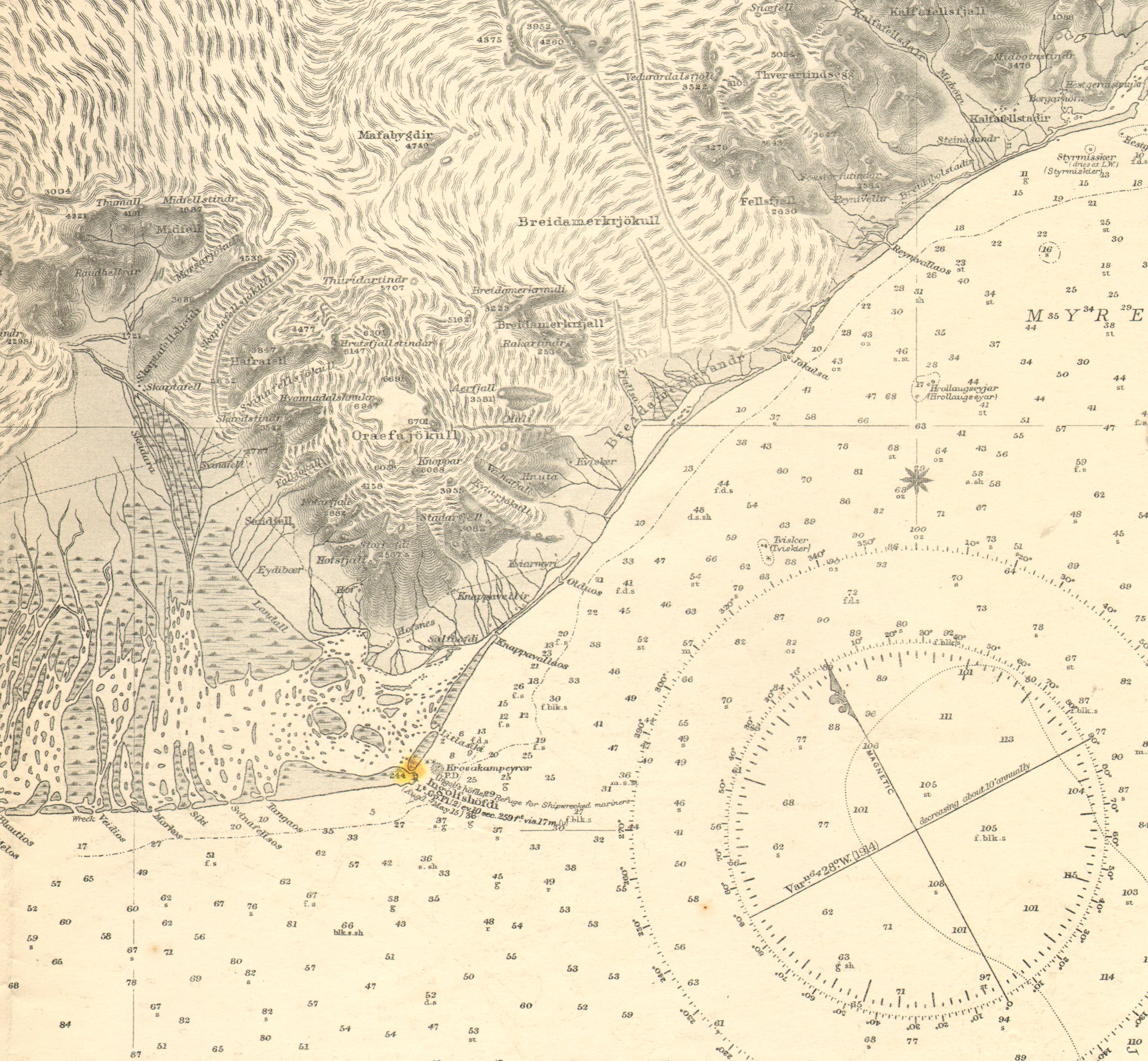
1899 map of Öræfajökull from a nautical chart

=== 2017 activity ===
Increased earthquake activity in the form of small tremors ranging from a depth of 1.5–10 km beneath the summit crater, began in August 2017 according to the Icelandic Meteorological Office.

The Aviation Colour Code of the United States was raised to yellow on 17 November 2017, after the appearance of an ice cauldron inside the main crater and increased geothermal activity under the glacier.

=== 2018 activity ===
The seismic and geothermal activity which began in August 2017 continued into 2018, but at reduced levels. On 4 May 2018, the Icelandic Meteorological Office lowered the Aviation Colour Code to green.

== Landslide ==
In 2013 due to paraglacial slope failure, a large landslide affecting an area of 1.7 km^{2} (0.66 sq mi) occurred, that deposited debris on the volcano's Svínafellsjökull outlet glacier.

== See also ==
- Geography of Iceland
- Glaciers of Iceland
- Iceland plume
- List of lakes of Iceland
- List of islands of Iceland
- List of rivers of Iceland
- Waterfalls of Iceland
- Volcanism of Iceland
  - List of volcanic eruptions in Iceland
  - List of volcanoes in Iceland
