= Fláajökull =

Glacier in Iceland

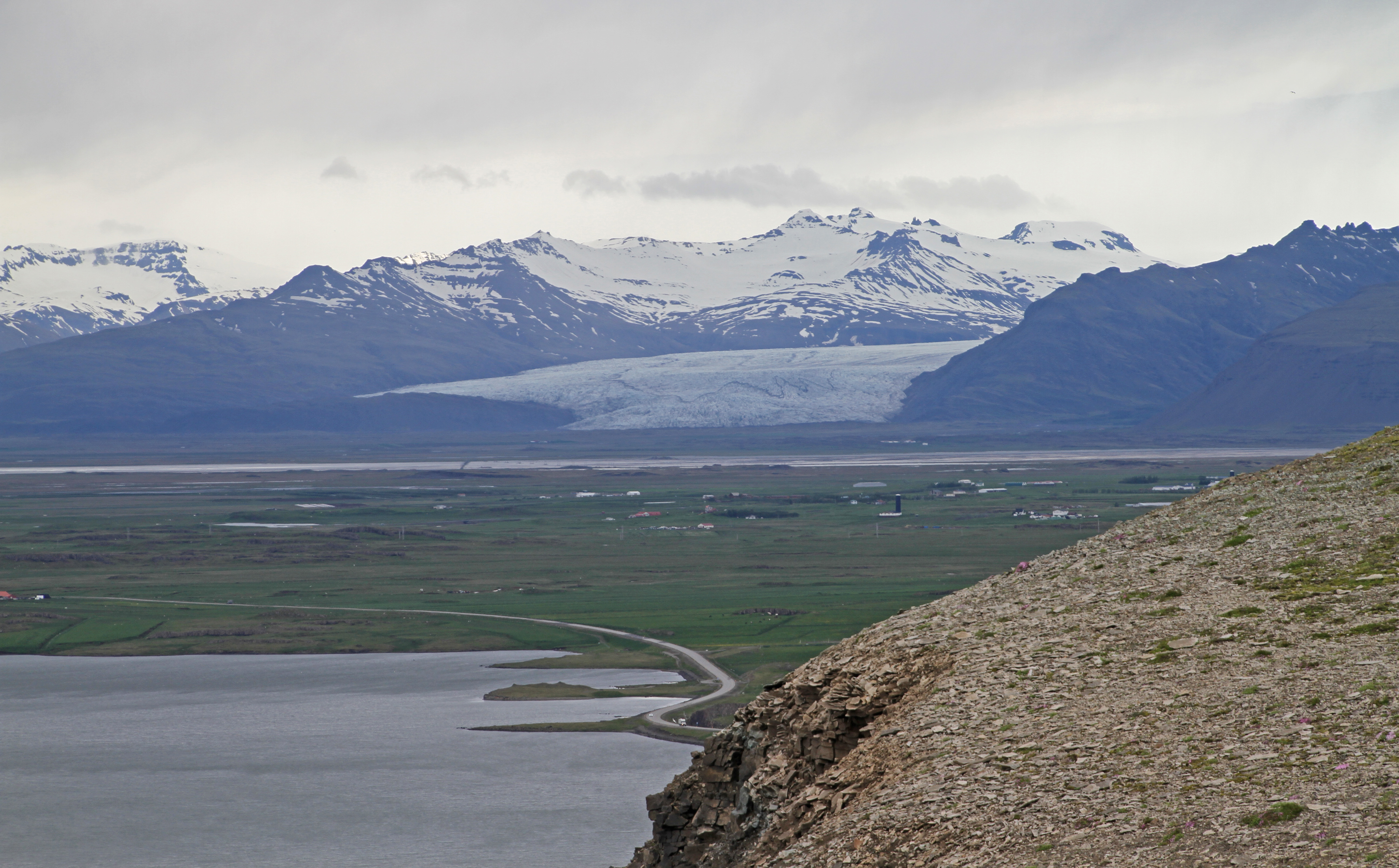
- Fláajökull seen from Almannaskarð (zoomed)

- Location within Iceland
- Coordinates: 64.365346°N 15.652259°W
- Length: 15 km (9.3 mi)
- Width: 2 km (1.2 mi)

Fláajökull (Icelandic pronunciation: [ˈflauːaˌjœːkʏtl̥]) is a smaller, slow flowing glacier of Iceland, located on the east side of volcano Breiðabunga in the east of Iceland, in Vatnajökull National Park, 40 km on road or 20 km on the map, northwest of Höfn town.

Fláajökull is an outlet glacier of the large glacier Vatnajökull. The name derives from flár, the Icelandic word for "slope". Historical names of the glacier are Mýrajökull, Hólmsárjökull and Hólsárjökull.
