= Hoffellsjökull =

Glacier in Iceland

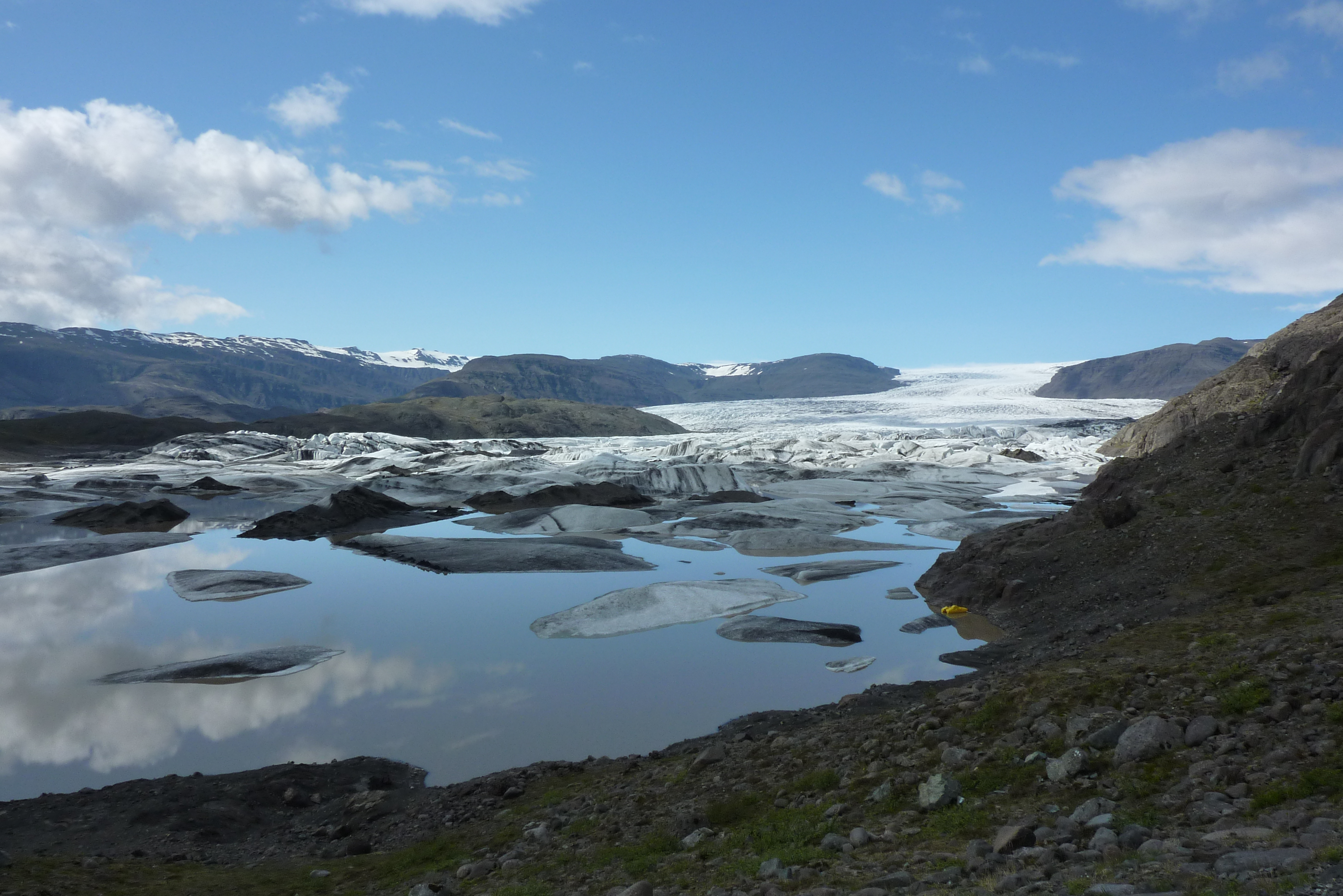
- View of Hoffellsjökull

- Location within Iceland
- Type: Outlet glacier
- Location: Hornafjörður, Eastern Region, South Constituency, Iceland
- Coordinates: 64°22′N 15°19′W

Hoffellsjökull (Icelandic pronunciation: [ˈhɔfːɛlsˌjœːkʏtl̥]) is an outlet glacier which flows from the ice cap of Vatnajökull. It is located in the municipality of Hornafjörður, southeast Iceland. Hoffellsjökull takes its name from Hoffell; a mountainous area and a farmland. Hoffellsjökull and the Hoffell area are a part of Vatnajökull National Park.
