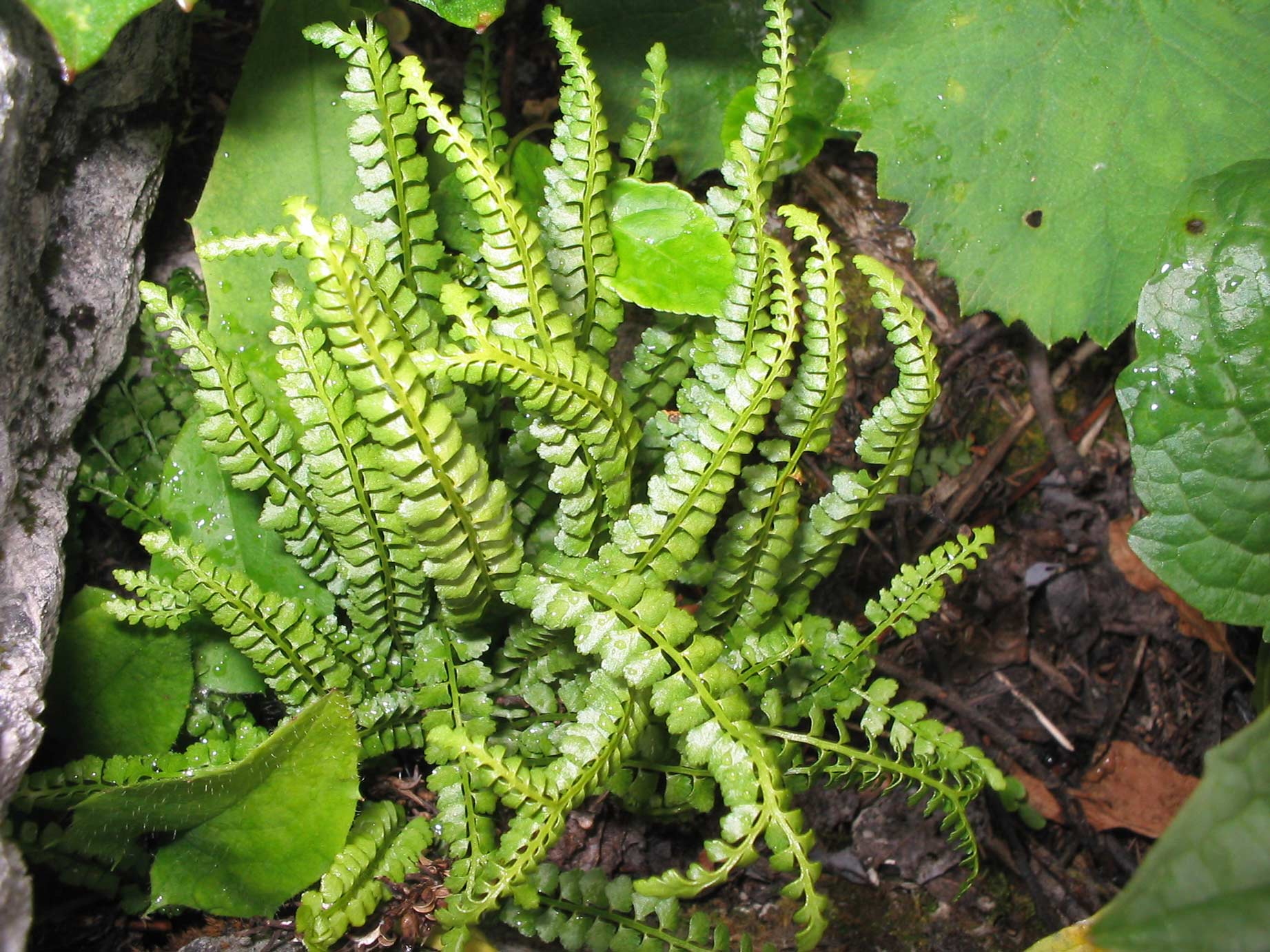

Conservation status
- Secure (NatureServe)

Scientific classification
- Kingdom: Plantae
- Clade: Tracheophytes
- Division: Polypodiophyta
- Class: Polypodiopsida
- Order: Polypodiales
- Suborder: Aspleniineae
- Family: Aspleniaceae
- Genus: Asplenium
- Species: A. viride

Binomial name
- Asplenium viride Huds.

= Asplenium viride =

Green spleenwort

Species of fern in the spleenwort family

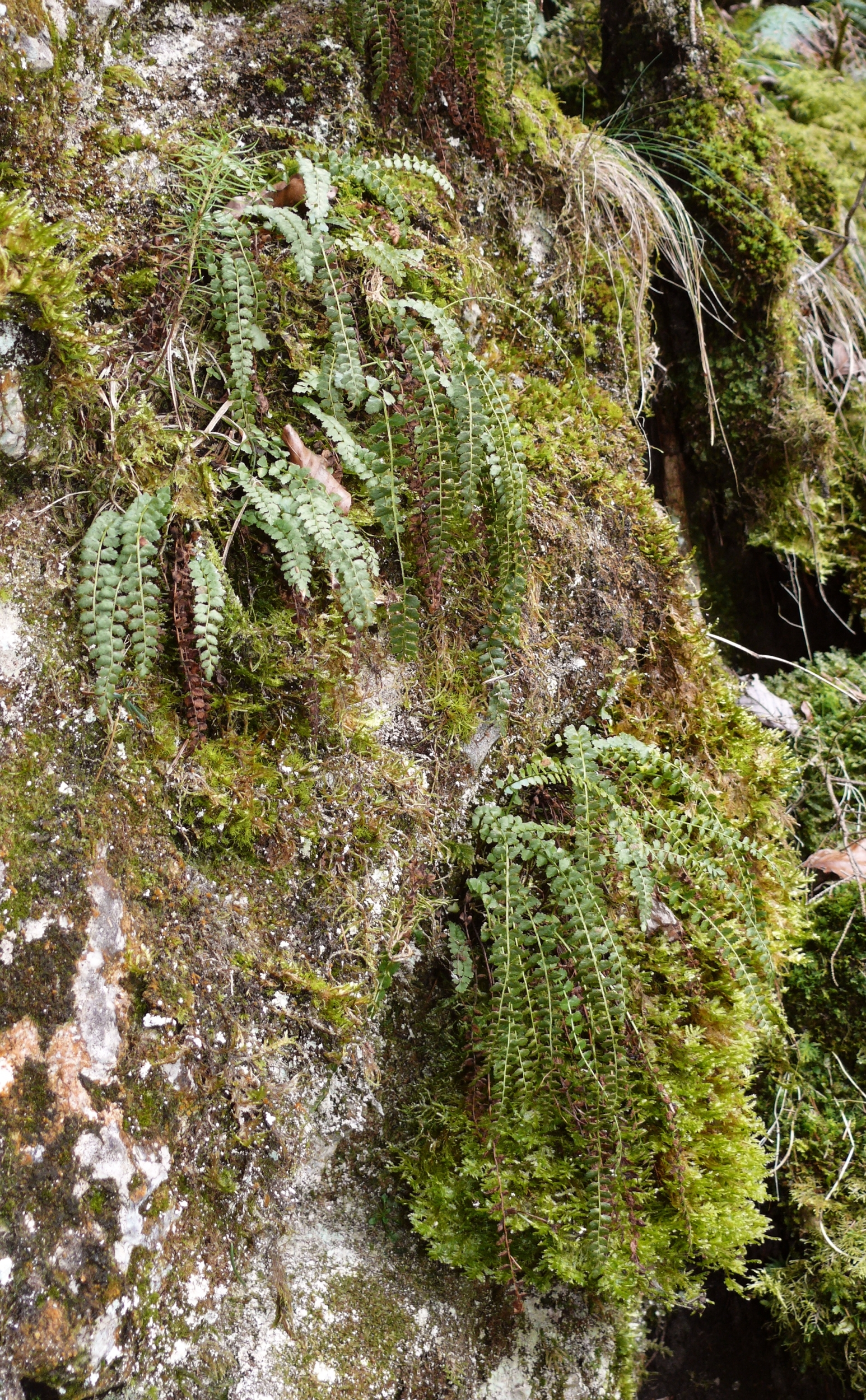
Green spleenwort in its native habitat in Germany

Asplenium viride is a species of fern known as the green spleenwort because of its green stipes and rachides. This feature easily distinguishes it from the very similar-looking maidenhair spleenwort, Asplenium trichomanes.

== Taxonomy ==
Green spleenwort was described by Carl Linnaeus in his 1753 Species Plantarum, under the name "Asplenium Trich. ramosum", with a type locality of "in Arvorniæ rupibus" (rocks in Caernarfonshire). Under the rules of the International Code of Botanical Nomenclature, phrase names such as "Asplenium Trichomanes ramosum" are to be treated as orthographic errors – in this case, for "Asplenium ramosum". That name was later rejected in favour of William Hudson's later name Asplenium viride, which had a type locality of "in rupibus humidis in montibus Walliæ et in comitatibus Eboracensi et Westmorlandico" (damp rocks in the mountains of Wales, Yorkshire and Westmorland).

A global phylogeny of Asplenium published in 2020 divided the genus into eleven clades, which were given informal names pending further taxonomic study. A. viride belongs to the "A. viride subclade" of the "A. trichomanes clade". The A. trichomanes clade has a worldwide distribution. Members of the clade grow on rocks and usually have once-pinnate leaf blades with slender, chestnut to dark-brown stalks. The A. viride subclade, which contains only A. viride and its allopolyploid descendant A. adulterinum, is exceptional in having green stalks.

== Ecology ==
A. viride is a native species of northern and western North America and northern Europe and Asia. It is a small rock fern, growing on calcareous rock. It is a diploid species, with n = 36, and hybridizes with Asplenium trichomanes to produce Asplenium × adulterinum, found on Vancouver Island, British Columbia.
