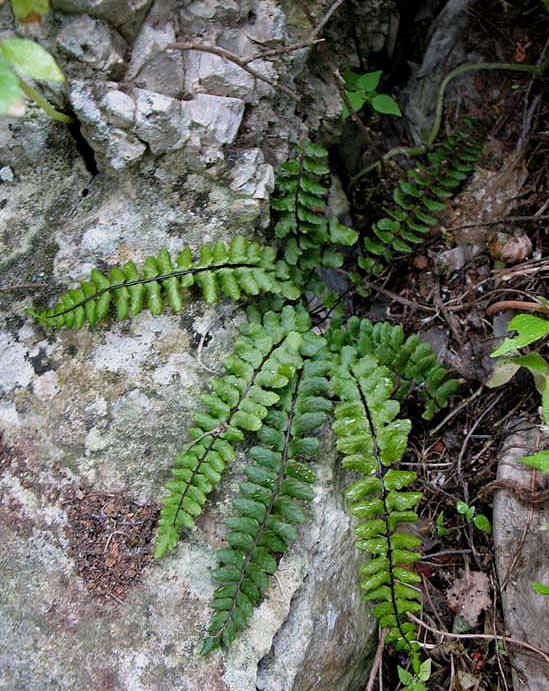

Scientific classification
- Kingdom: Plantae
- Clade: Tracheophytes
- Division: Polypodiophyta
- Class: Polypodiopsida
- Order: Polypodiales
- Suborder: Aspleniineae
- Family: Aspleniaceae
- Genus: Asplenium
- Species: A. trichomanes
- Subspecies: A. t. subsp. coriaceifolium

Trinomial name
- Asplenium trichomanes subsp. coriaceifolium Rasbach, K.Rasbach, Reichst. & Bennert

Synonyms
- Asplenium azomanes Rosselló, Cubas & Rebassa

= Asplenium trichomanes subsp. coriaceifolium =

Subspecies of fern in the spleenwort family

Asplenium trichomanes subsp. coriaceifolium is an allotetraploid hybrid fern (2n = 144 chromosomes) of the family Aspleniaceae. It was found for the first time in the Soller Valley in the Serra de Tramuntana of the island of Mallorca, Spain, and described by both Spanish and German botanists at the same time. The Spaniards gave it the name Asplenium azomanes.

Its fronds are coriacea as plastic and the rachis is very thick, dark garnet color and brilliance. A typical feature of this fern is the existence of a small atrium at the base of the pinnae medium and lower geared towards the apex of the frond with one or two sori in its underside. Sporulation occurs from October to March.

== Habitat ==
It lives among the stones of the walls of the terraces and in the crevices of limestone rocks oriented to the north and northwest. Depending on the degree of exposure to the sun, its phenotype changes a lot, becoming more coriaceous the more sunlight it receives. In the driest months of summer comes into estivation, dehydrating their fronds, reaching apparently dead. With the first rains of autumn, the fern rehydrate the dried fronds and turn green quickly.

== Distribution ==
Its population is distributed in three locations separated by the Mediterranean Sea: the Balearic Islands (Mallorca, Ibiza and Formentera), south of the Iberian Peninsula (Albacete, Jaen, Malaga and Cadiz) and the north of Morocco (from Chefchaouen in Western Rif until the rocks surrounding the Caves of Chameau in Mountains of Beni Snassen).

== Hybrids ==
- Asplenium × tubalense (Asplenium trichomanes nothosubsp. barreraense): allotetraploid hybrid between Asplenium trichomanes subsp. coriaceifolium and Asplenium trichomanes subsp. quadrivalens.
- Asplenium trichomanes nothosubsp. malacitense: hexaploid hybrid between Asplenium trichomanes subsp. coriaceifolium and Asplenium trichomanes subsp. inexpectans.
