= Vatnajökull =

Icelandic glacier

- Vatna Glacier
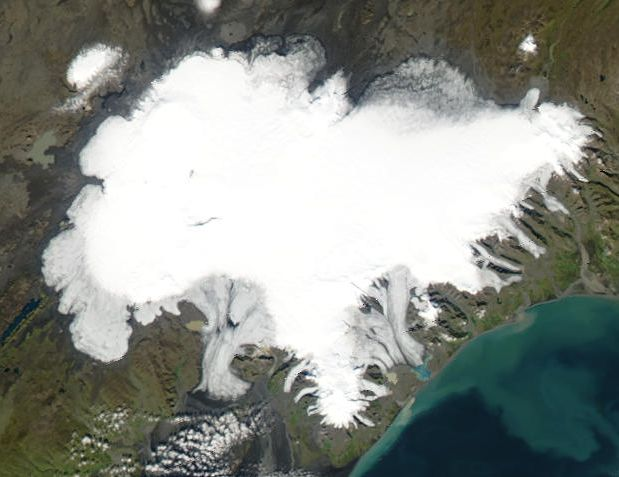
- Vatnajökull, Iceland
- Map of Vatnajökull ice cap showing its named glacial catchments (light grey shading). Clicking on the map rectangle to enlarge it, enables mouse over that allows identification of individual named glacial catchments in Iceland.
- Type: Ice cap
- Location: Iceland
- Coordinates: 64°24′N 16°48′W
- Area: 7,700 km^{2} (3,000 sq mi)
- Thickness: 380 m (1,250 ft) average
- Terminus: Outlet glaciers
- Status: Retreating

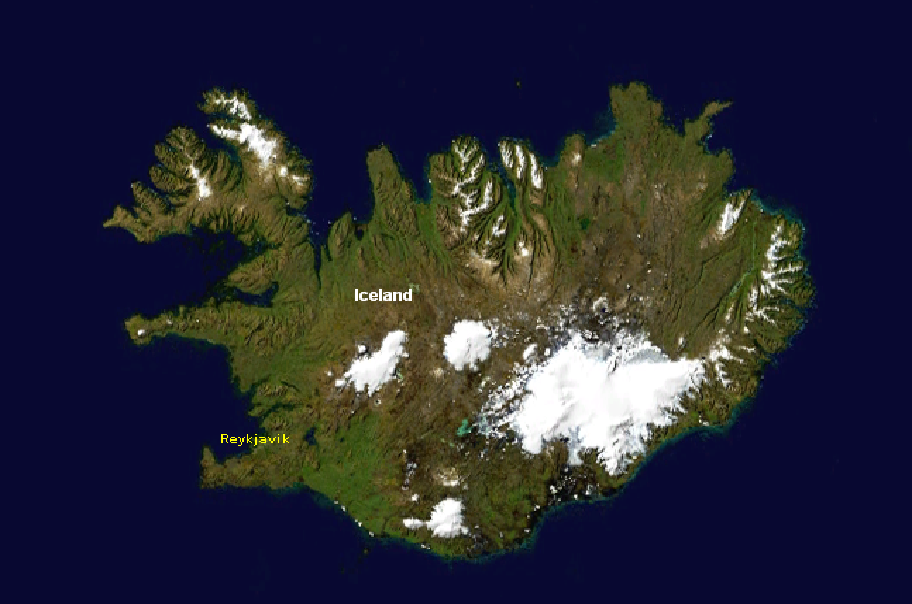
Iceland as seen from space, with Vatnajökull appearing as the largest white area to the lower right

Vatnajökull (Icelandic pronunciation: [ˈvahtnaˌjœːkʏtl̥], literally "Glacier of Lakes"; sometimes translated as Vatna Glacier in English) is the largest and most voluminous ice cap in Iceland, and the second largest in area in Europe after the Severny Island ice cap of Novaya Zemlya. It is in the south-east of the island, covering approximately 8% of the country.

== Size ==
With an area of 7,700 km^{2} (3,000 sq mi) Vatnajökull is the second largest ice cap in Europe by volume, being about 3,000 km^{3} (720 cu mi) and area (after the still larger Severny Island ice cap of Novaya Zemlya, Russia, which is in the extreme northeast of Europe). On 7 June 2008, it became a part of the Vatnajökull National Park.

The average thickness of the ice is 380 m (1,250 ft), with a maximum thickness of 950 m (3,120 ft). Iceland's highest peak, Hvannadalshnjúkur (2,109.6 m or 6,921 ft 3 in), as part of the Öræfajökull, is in the southern periphery of Vatnajökull, near Skaftafell.

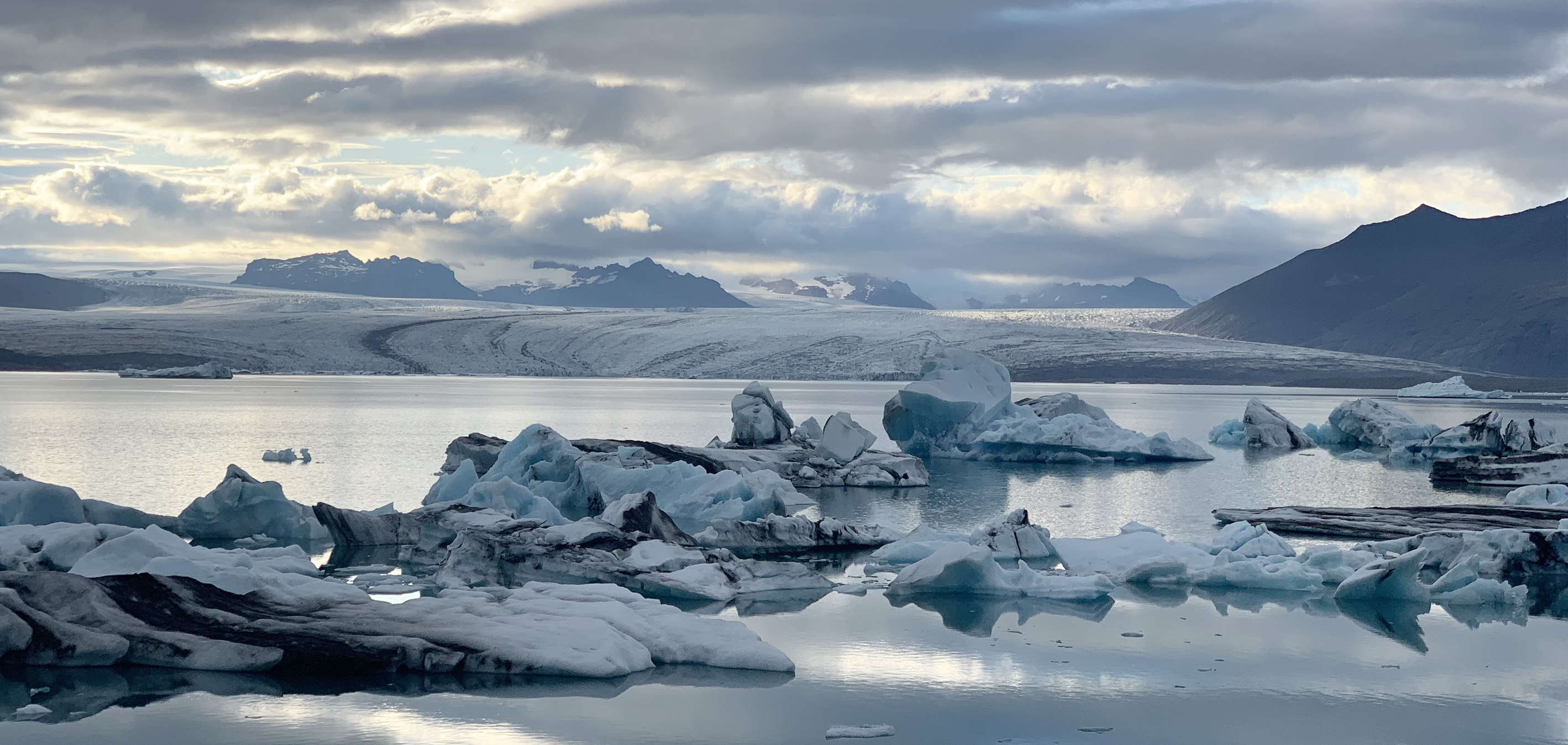
Ice lagoon at the foot of the Vatnajökull Glacier

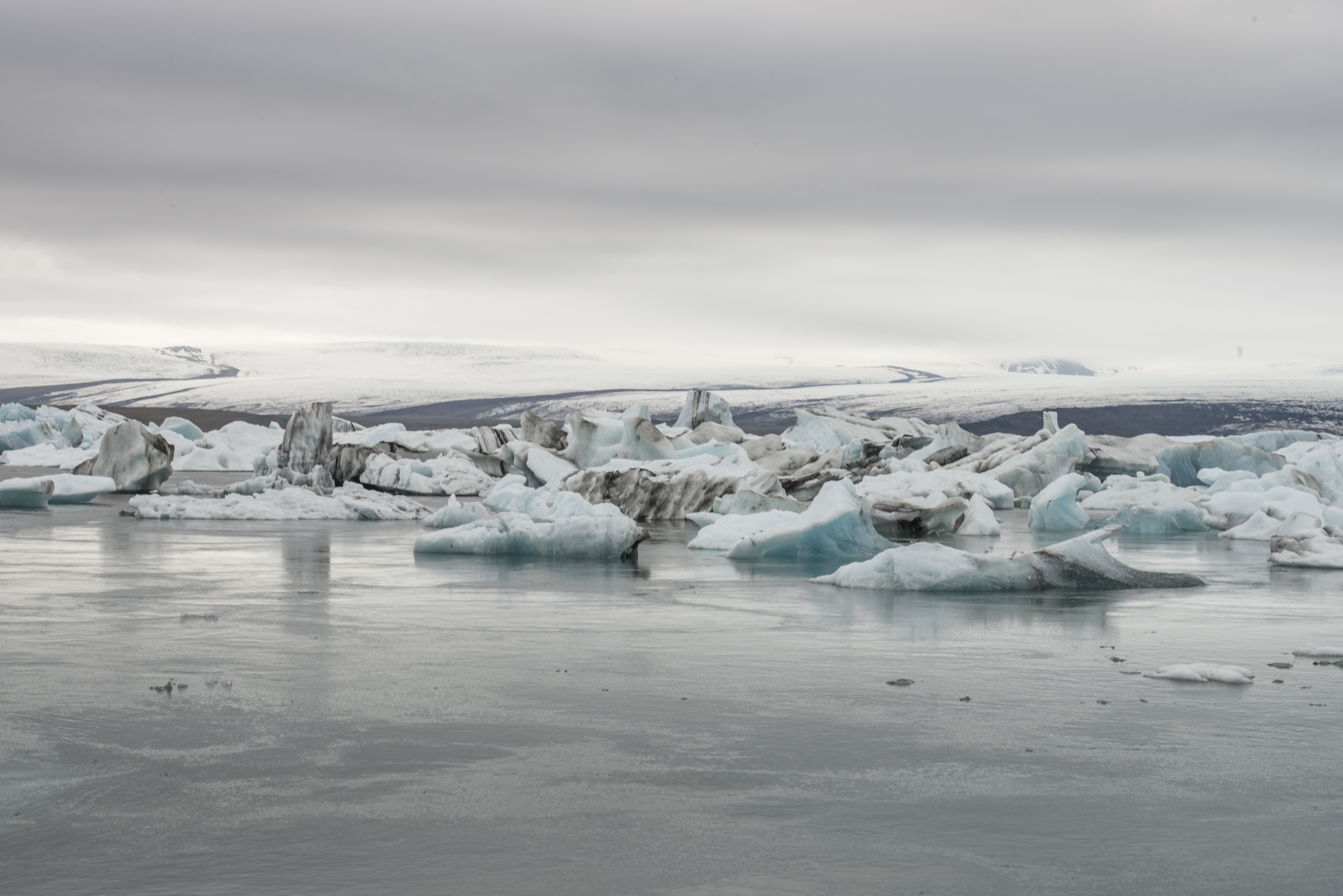
Vatnajökull Glacier in Iceland

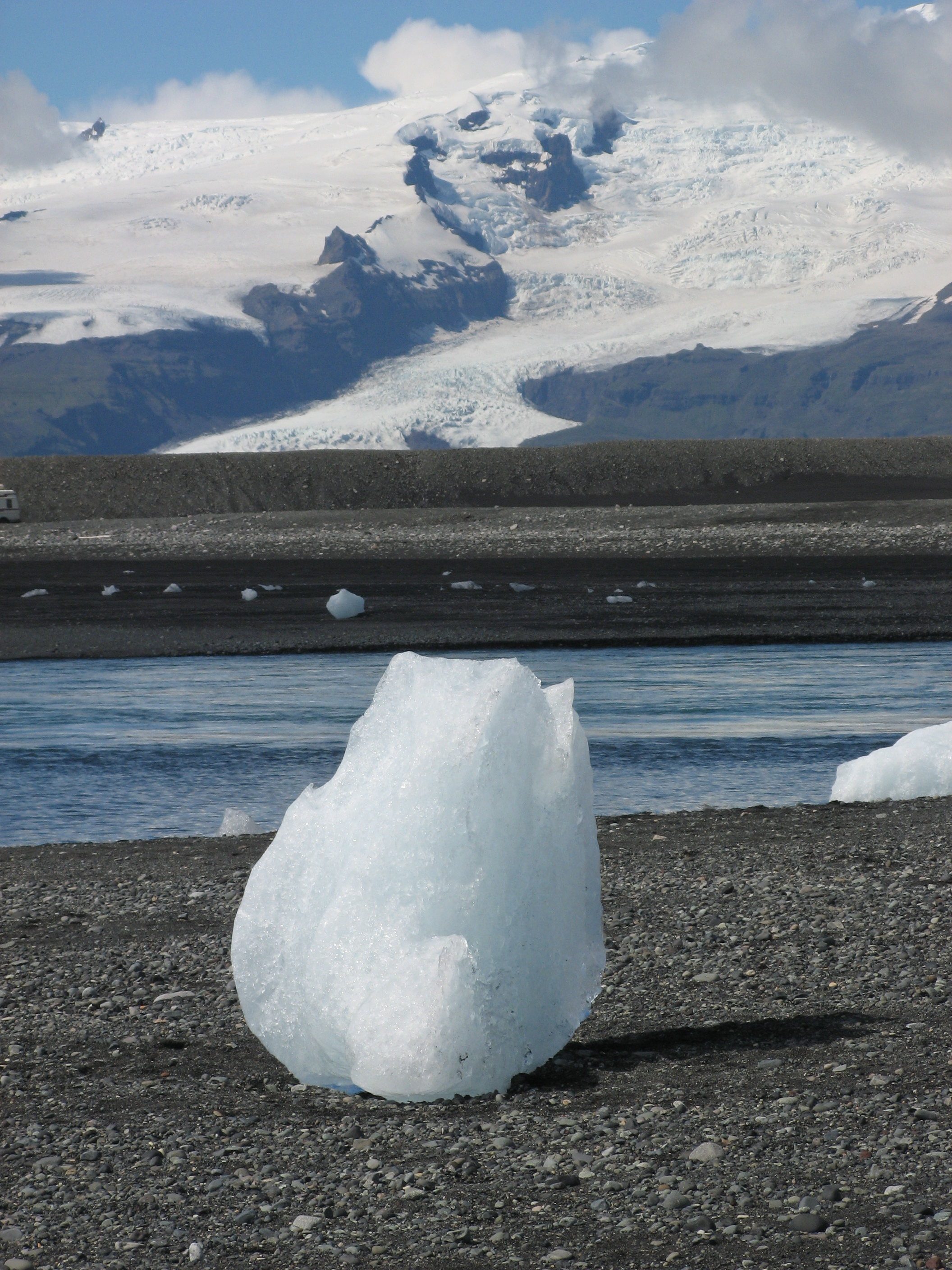
An iceberg with Öræfajökull (southernmost part of Vatnajökull) in the background. The icebergs in Jökulsárlón, as well as this one, have broken off Vatnajökull's outlet glaciers.

== Peaks ==
Hrútsfjallstindar is a series of Icelandic peaks rising from Vatnajökull between Svínafellsjökull and Skaftafellsjökull, in its southern part. There are four peaks, which range from 1,756 metres (5,761 ft) to 1,875 metres (6,152 ft) high.

== Volcanoes ==
Vatnajökull has a unique geographic location, as it lies between two tectonic plate boundaries, and the centre of the mantle plume is located under the northwest area of the glacier. The relationship between Vatnajökull and the volcanoes beneath it is classified as glaciovolcanism. Under the ice cap, as under many of the glaciers of Iceland, there are several volcanoes. Eruptions from these volcanoes have led to the development of large pockets of water beneath the ice, which may burst the weakened ice and cause a jökulhlaup (glacial lake outburst flood). During the last ice age, there were numerous volcanic eruptions under Vatnajökull, creating many subglacial eruptions.

In recent times, the volcanoes continue to erupt beneath the glaciers, resulting in many documented floods. One jökulhlaup in 1934 caused the release of 15 km^{3} (3 1/2 cu mi) of water over the course of several days. The volcanic lake Grímsvötn was the source of a large jökulhlaup in 1996. There was also a considerable but short-lived eruption of the volcano under these lakes at the beginning of November 2004. On 21 May 2011 a volcanic eruption started in Grímsvötn in Vatnajökull National Park at around 19:00. The plume reached up to 17 km (56,000 ft).

== In culture ==
An older Icelandic name for Vatnajökull was Klofajökull [ˈkʰlɔːvaˌjœːkʏtl̥] (Cleft Glacier, due to cuts into the ice, several of which can be presumed to have led to the name). This name is known from 18th-century sources such as the writings of Eggert Ólafsson and Bjarni Pálsson. In September 1950, a Douglas DC-4 operated by the private airline Loftleiðir crash-landed on the Vatnajökull glacier. The entire six-person crew survived. A rescue operation was launched after the crew managed to send a distress signal on the fourth day. The crew and the rescue team walked the 34 km to safety.

The glacier was used as the setting for the opening sequence (set in Siberia) of the 1985 James Bond film A View to a Kill, in which Bond (played for the last time by Roger Moore) eliminated a host of armed villains before escaping in a submarine to Alaska. Several other films, including another in the Bond franchise, have been filmed on or using Jökulsárlón, the terminal lake of the Breiðamerkurjökull outlet from Vatnajökull.

In 2004, Vatnajökull was one of several Icelandic settings visited on the first leg of The Amazing Race 6.

Westlife's official music video for their twenty-fifth single top 10 and #2 UK hit in 2009 "What About Now" was the last film of Vatnajökull before the next volcanic eruption.

In November 2011, the glacier was used as a shooting location for the second season of the HBO fantasy TV series Game of Thrones.

In 2013, Vatnajökull was a scenic background in the movie Interstellar, directed and produced by Christopher Nolan.

== Outlet glaciers ==
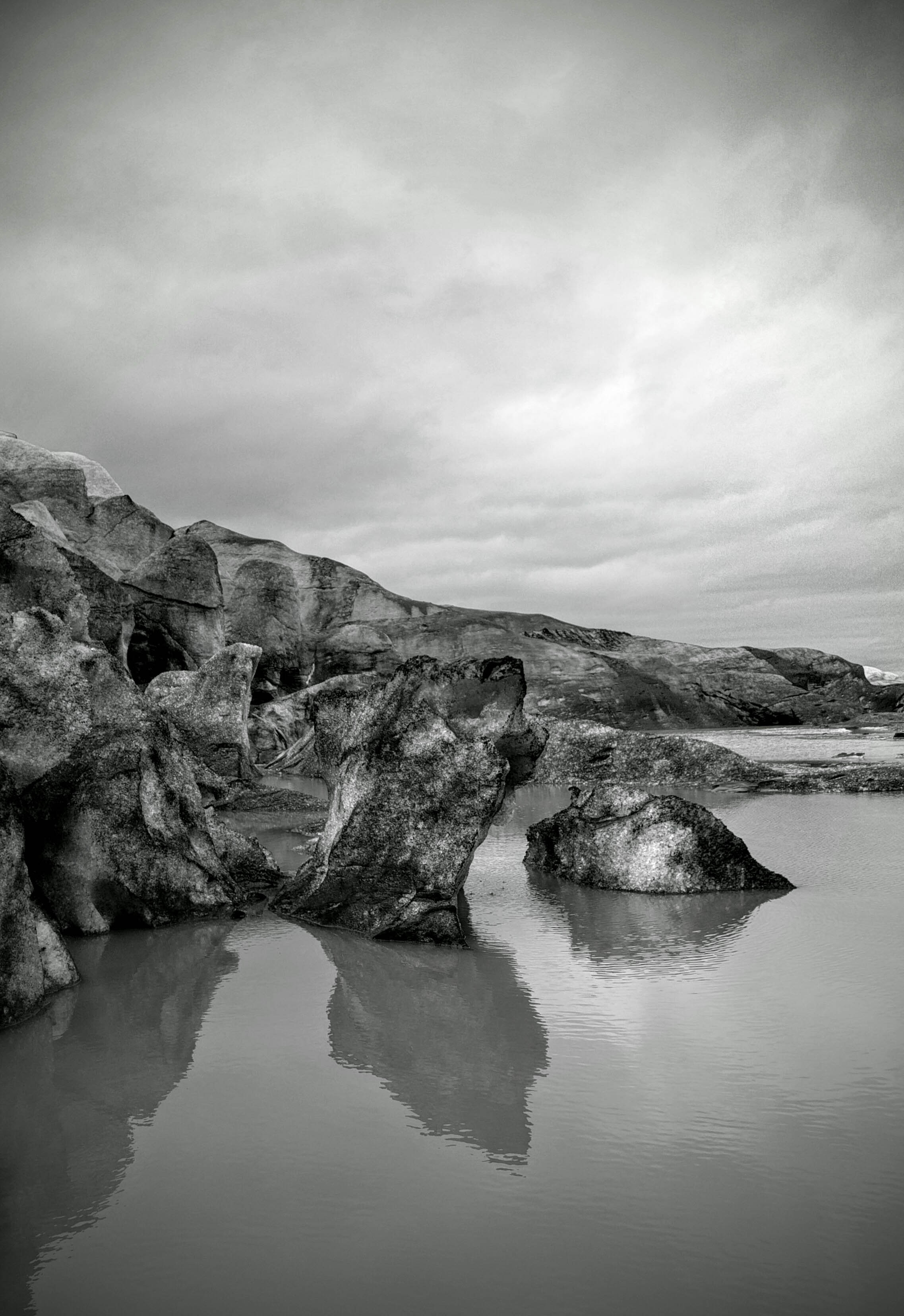
Fláajökull outlet glacier

Vatnajökull has around 30 outlet glaciers flowing from the ice cap. The Icelandic term for glacier is "jökull", and so is the term for outlet glacier. Given below is a list of outlet glaciers flowing from Vatnajökull, sorted by the four administrative territories of Vatnajökull National Park. This is not a complete list.

Southern territory

- Austurtungnajökull
- Axarfellsjökull
- Birnudalsjökull
- Breiðamerkurjökull
- Brókarjökull [ˈprouːkarˌjœːkʏtl̥]
- Eyvindstungnajökull
- Falljökull [ˈfatlˌjœːkʏtl̥]
- Fellsárjökull
- Fjallsjökull [ˈfjalsˌjœːkʏtl̥]
- Fláajökull [ˈflauːaˌjœːkʏtl̥]
- Gljúfursárjökull
- Heinabergsjökull [ˈheiːnaˌpɛrksˌjœːkʏtl̥, -ˌpɛr̥s-]
- Hoffellsjökull
- Hólárjökull [ˈhouːlˌaurˌjœːkʏtl̥]
- Hrútárjökull [ˈr̥uːtˌaurˌjœːkʏtl̥]
- Kotárjökull
- Kvíárjökull [ˈkʰviːˌaurˌjœːkʏtl̥]
- Lambatungnajökull [ˈlampaˌtʰuŋnaˌjœːkʏtl̥, -ˌtʰunːa-]
- Morsárjökull [ˈmɔr̥sˌaurˌjœːkʏtl̥]
- Norðurtungnajökull
- Rótarfjallsjökull
- Skaftafellsjökull [ˈskaftaˌfɛlsˌjœːkʏtl̥]
- Skálafellsjökull [ˈskauːlaˌfɛlsˌjœːkʏtl̥]
- Skeiðarárjökull [ˈsceiːðarˌaurˌjœːkʏtl̥]
- Stigárjökull [ˈstɪːɣˌaurˌjœːkʏtl̥]
- Stórhöfðajökull
- Suðurfjallsjökull
- Svínafellsjökull [ˈsviːnaˌfɛlsˌjœːkʏtl̥]
- Vesturdalsjökull
- Viðborðsjökull [ˈvɪðˌpɔrðsˌjœːkʏtl̥]
- Virkisjökull [ˈvɪr̥cɪsˌjœːkʏtl̥]

Eastern territory

- Brúarjökull [ˈpruːarˌjœːkʏtl̥]
- Eyjabakkajökull [ˈeiːjaˌpahkaˌjœːkʏtl̥]
- Geldingafellsjökull
- Kverkjökull [ˈkʰvɛr̥kˌjœːkʏtl̥]
- Kverkkvíslarjökull
- Kvíslarjökull

Northern territory

- Dyngjujökull

Western territory

- Grænalónsjökull
- Köldukvíslarjökull [ˈkʰœltʏˌvistlarˌjœːkʏtl̥]
- Síðujökull [ˈsiːðʏˌjœːkʏtl̥]
- Skaftárjökull [ˈskaftˌaurˌjœːkʏtl̥]
- Sylgjujökull [ˈsɪlcʏˌjœːkʏtl̥]
- Tungnaárjökul [ˈtʰuŋnaˌaurˌjœːkʏtl̥, ˈtʰunːa-]

== Recent temperature changes ==
In 2025, the average air temperature surrounding Vatnajökull reached a low of -1.09 degrees Celsius in January and a high of 0.97 degrees Celsius in December. In 1975, the average air temperature reached a low of -1.50 degrees Celsius in July and a high of 0.45 degrees Celsius in December. These changes in atmospheric warming have been mitigated by the Cold Blob, a patch of cold water in the North Atlantic Ocean counteracting warming temperatures in Iceland. While temperatures are changing and impacting the ice and snow composition of Vatnajökull, environmental equilibrium will be impacted now and in the future.

== See also ==
- Geography of Iceland
- List of volcanic eruptions in Iceland
- Iceland plume
- Vatnajökull National Park
