= Protected area with sustainable use of natural resources =

A protected area with sustainable use of natural resources or managed resource protected area is a protected area in which the aim is to protect and preserve biological diversity in the long term. The IUCN defines such areas as Category VI.

== IUCN definition ==
According to the IUCN, protected areas with sustainable use of natural resources are defined as areas that:

conserve ecosystems and habitats, together with associated cultural values and traditional natural resource management systems. They are generally large, with most of the area in a natural condition, where a proportion is under sustainable natural resource management and where low-level non-industrial use of natural resources compatible with nature conservation is seen as one of the main aims of the area.

== Criticism ==
The concept is criticised by ecologists on the grounds that the aspiration for these areas is hardly practicable in reality because nature conservation is almost never possible without restricting human activity and also because the economic activities of a population inevitably affect the ecosystems.

== See also ==
- IUCN protected area categories
