= Volcano warning schemes of the United States =

Alert systems for volcanic activity

In October 2006, the United States Geological Survey (USGS) adopted a nationwide alert system for characterizing the level of unrest and eruptive activity at volcanoes. The system is now used by the Alaska Volcano Observatory, the California Volcano Observatory (California and Nevada), the Cascades Volcano Observatory (Washington, Oregon and Idaho), the Hawaiian Volcano Observatory and the Yellowstone Volcano Observatory (Montana, Wyoming, Colorado, Utah, New Mexico and Arizona).

Under this system, the USGS ranks the level of activity at a U.S. volcano using the terms "normal", for typical volcanic activity in a non-eruptive phase; "advisory", for elevated unrest; "watch", for escalating unrest or an eruption underway that poses limited hazards; and, "warning", if a highly hazardous eruption is underway or imminent. These levels reflect conditions at a volcano and the expected or ongoing hazardous volcanic phenomena. When an alert level is assigned by an observatory, accompanying text will give a fuller explanation of the observed phenomena and clarify hazard implications to affected groups.

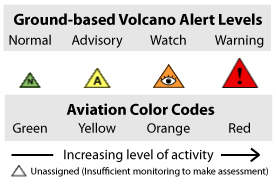
Both ground and aviation alerts are provided for volcanoes in the U.S.

== Summary of Volcanic Activity Alert Notification System ==
Normal	Typical background activity of a volcano in a non-eruptive state: After a change from a higher level: Volcanic activity considered to have ceased, and volcano reverted to its normal, non-eruptive state.
Advisory	Elevated unrest above known background activity: After a change from a higher level: Volcanic activity has decreased significantly but continues to be closely monitored for possible renewed increase.
Watch	Heightened/escalating unrest with increased potential for eruptive activity (timeframe variable) OR a minor eruption underway that poses limited hazards.
Warning	Highly hazardous eruption underway or imminent.

== Aviation color codes ==
Code	Description
Green	Volcano is in its normal "dormant" state: After a change from a higher level: Volcanic activity considered to have ceased, and volcano reverted to its normal, non-eruptive state.
Yellow	Volcano is exhibiting signs of strong unrest above known background levels.: After a change from a higher level: Volcanic activity has decreased significantly but continues to be closely monitored for possible renewed increase.
Orange	Volcano is exhibiting heightened unrest with increased likelihood of eruption, or, Volcanic eruption underway with no or minor ash emission (specify ash-plume height if possible).
Red	Eruption is forecast to be imminent with significant emission of ash into the atmosphere likely, or, Eruption is underway with significant emission of ash into the atmosphere (specify ash-plume height if possible).

== Earlier volcano warning schemes for the United States ==
Prior to October 2006, three parallel Volcano warning schemes were used by the United States Geological Survey and the volcano observatories for different volcano ranges in the United States. They each have a base level for dormant-quiescent states and three grades of alert.

=== Color Code Conditions, Long Valley Caldera and Mono-Inyo Craters Region, California ===
Developed in 1997 to replace a previous 5-level system devised in 1991.

Code	Narrative	Levels
Green	No immediate risk	Levels from Quiescent to Strong Unrest
Yellow	Watch	Intense Unrest
Orange	Warning	Accelerating intense unrest: eruption likely within hours to days
Red	Eruption in progress	Levels 1 (Minor eruption) to 4 (Massive explosive eruption)

=== Level of Concern Color Codes for volcanoes in Alaska ===
The Alaska Volcano Observatory (AVO) used the following color-coded system to rate volcanic activity. It was originally established during the 1989-90 eruption of Redoubt Volcano.

Class	Description
Green	Volcano is in its normal "dormant" state.
Yellow	Volcano is restless. Seismic activity is elevated. Potential for eruptive activity is increased.
Orange	Small ash eruption expected or confirmed. Plume(s) not likely to rise above 25,000 feet above sea level.
Red	Large ash eruptions expected or confirmed. Plume likely to rise above 25,000 feet above sea level.

All five classifications are spelled as proper nouns, i.e., Level of Concern Color Code Orange not Level of concern color code Orange or any other variation. On its website the AVO spells the alert color in all capitals, but this is not otherwise necessary outside their system.

=== Warning system for Cascade Range volcanoes in Washington and Oregon ===
Introduced following the May 18, 1980, eruption of Mount St. Helens.

Code	Narrative	Levels
No Alert	"Information Statements" may be issued about unusual but non-threatening events	
Alert Level One	Notice of Volcanic Unrest	Significant anomalous conditions are recognized that could be indicative of an eventual hazardous volcanic event.
Alert Level Two	Volcano Advisory	Monitoring and evaluation indicate that processes are underway that have significant likelihood of culminating in hazardous volcanic activity but when the evidence does not indicate that a life- or property-threatening event is imminent.
Alert Level Three	Volcano Alert	Monitoring and evaluation indicate that precursory events have escalated to the point where a volcanic event with attendant volcanologic or hydrologic hazards threatening to life and property appears imminent or is underway.
