= Hvannadalshnjúkur =

Mountain in Iceland

Hvannadalshnjúkur (Hvannadalshnúkur)
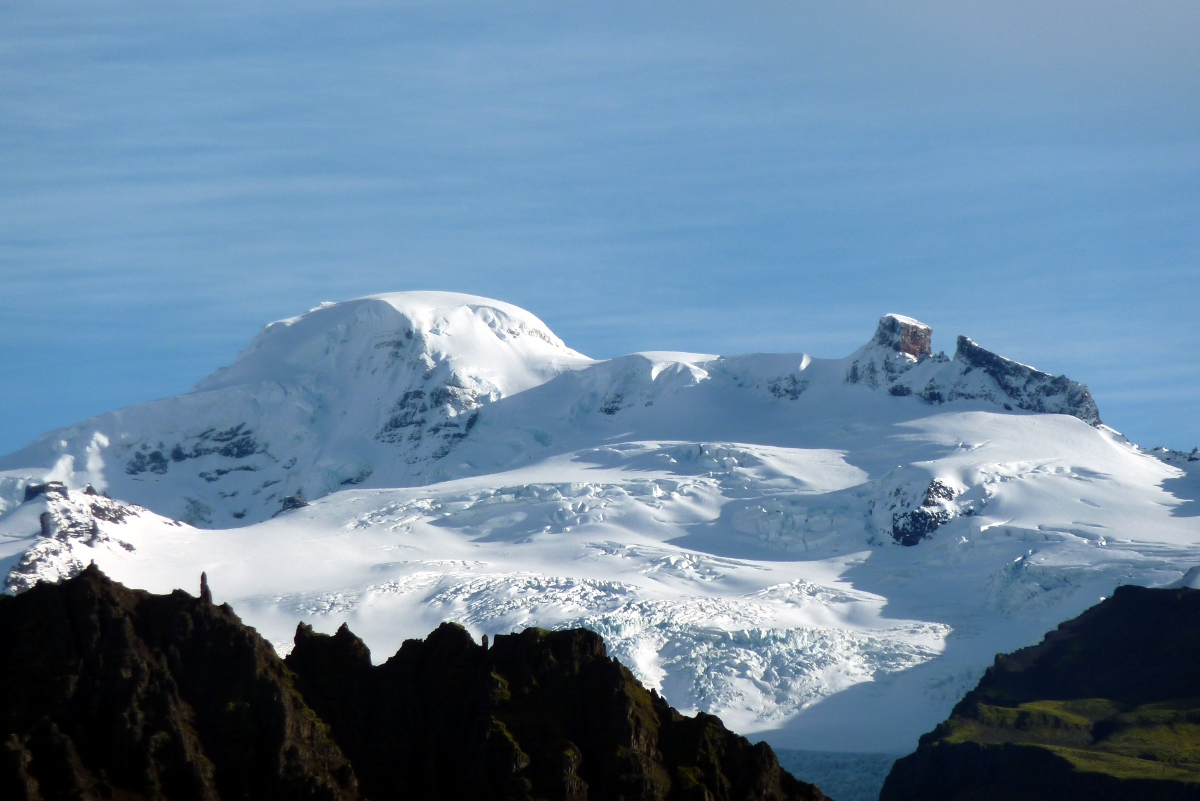

Highest point
- Elevation: 2,110 metres (6,920 ft)
- Prominence: 2,110 metres (6,920 ft)
- Isolation: 714.89 km (444.21 mi)
- Listing: Ultra; Country high point
- Coordinates: 64°00′57″N 16°40′29″W

Geography
- Location within Iceland
- Location: Vatnajökull National Park, Iceland
- Parent range: Öræfajökull volcano

Hvannadalshnjúkur (pronounced [ˈkʰvanːaˌtalsˌn̥juːkʏr̥, ˈxʷa-]) or Hvannadalshnúkur (Note: "Hnjúkur" is the more common spelling in the region where Hvannadalshnjúkur is, while "hnúkur" is the more common spelling in Reykjavík. Both are equally correct.) Icelandic pronunciation: [-ˌn̥uːkʏr̥] is a pyramidal peak on the northwestern rim of the summit crater of the Öræfajökull volcano in Vatnajökull National Park, Iceland. Its summit is the highest point and the only Ultra-prominent peak in the country.

== Geography ==
An official measurement in August 2005 established the height of the mountain as 2,109.6 metres (6,921 ft 3 in). Earlier surveys had measured a height of 2,119 m or 6,952 ft. The peak is part of the Vatnajökull National Park.

== See also ==
- List of islands by highest point
- List of European ultra prominent peaks
