= Vatnajökull National Park =

National park in Iceland

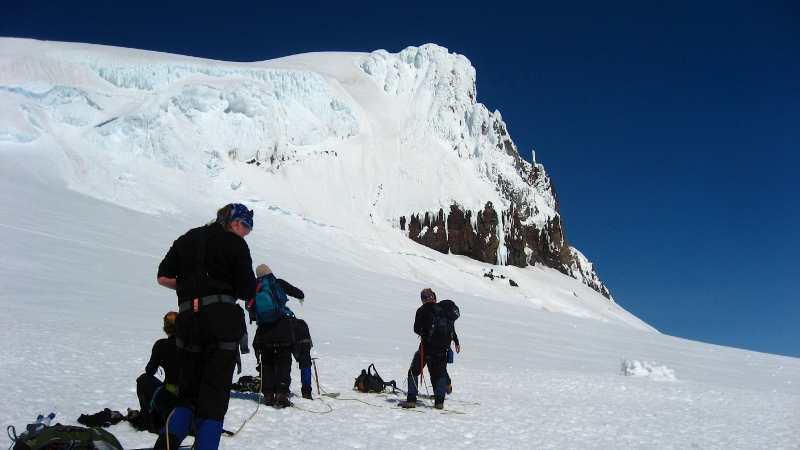
- Hikers journey to Hvannadalshnjúkur, the high peak of Öræfajökull.
- Interactive map of Vatnajökull National Park
- Location: South, southeast, east and northeast Iceland
- Coordinates: 64°30′N 17°00′W
- Area: 14,967 square kilometres (5,779 sq mi)
- Established: 7 June 2008; 18 years ago

UNESCO World Heritage Site
- Official name: Vatnajökull National Park - dynamic nature of fire and ice
- Criteria: Natural: (viii)
- Designated: 2019 (43rd session)
- Reference no.: 1604
- Region: Northern Europe

Vatnajökull National Park (Icelandic: Vatnajökulsþjóðgarður pronounced [ˈvahtnaˌjœːkʏlsˌθjouðˌkarðʏr̥]) is one of three national parks in Iceland, and is the largest one. It encompasses all of Vatnajökull glacier and extensive surrounding areas. These include the national parks previously existing at Skaftafell in the southwest and Jökulsárgljúfur in the north.

The qualities of Vatnajökull National Park are primarily its great variety of landscape features, created by the combined forces of rivers, glacial ice, and volcanic and geothermal activity.

The park spans 14% of the country's area and is Europe's second largest national park in terms of area after Yugyd Va in the Ural Mountains of Russia. The glacier itself is the largest in Europe at 7,700 square kilometres (3,000 sq mi).

In 2019, the park was enlarged to the north.

On 5 July 2019 Vatnajökull National Park was inscribed as a World Heritage Site.

== History ==
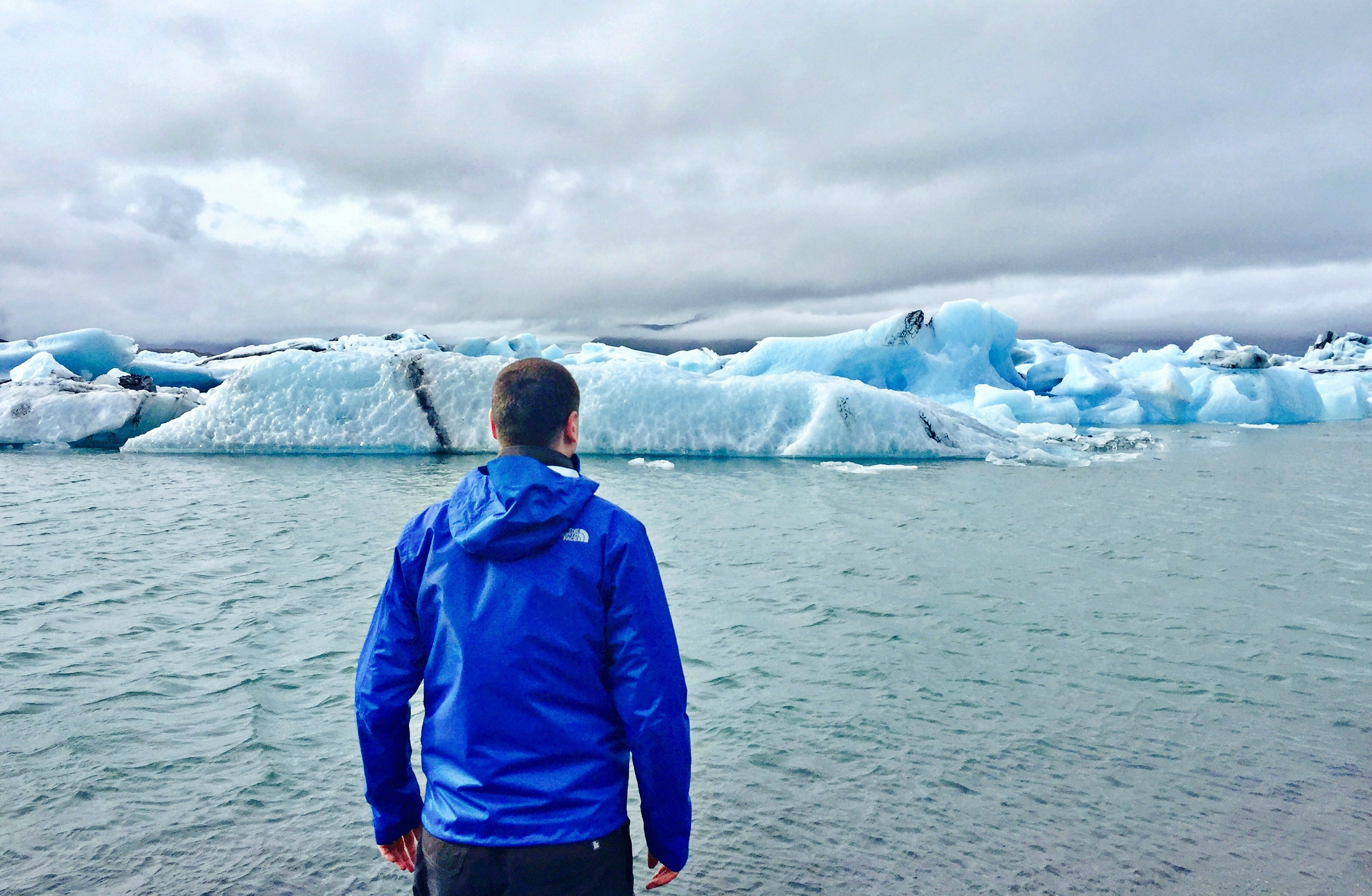
Jökulsárlón, located on the edge of Vatnajökull National Park

Vatnajökull National Park was established on 7 June 2008. When established, the park covered an area of 12,000 km^{2}, but with later additions of Lakagígar, Langisjór, Krepputunga [ˈkʰrɛhpʏˌtʰuŋka] and Jökulsárlón (including its surrounding areas) it now covers 14,967 km^{2} or approximately 14% of Iceland, making it Europe's second largest national park in terms of area after Yugyd Va in Russia.

== Geography and geology ==
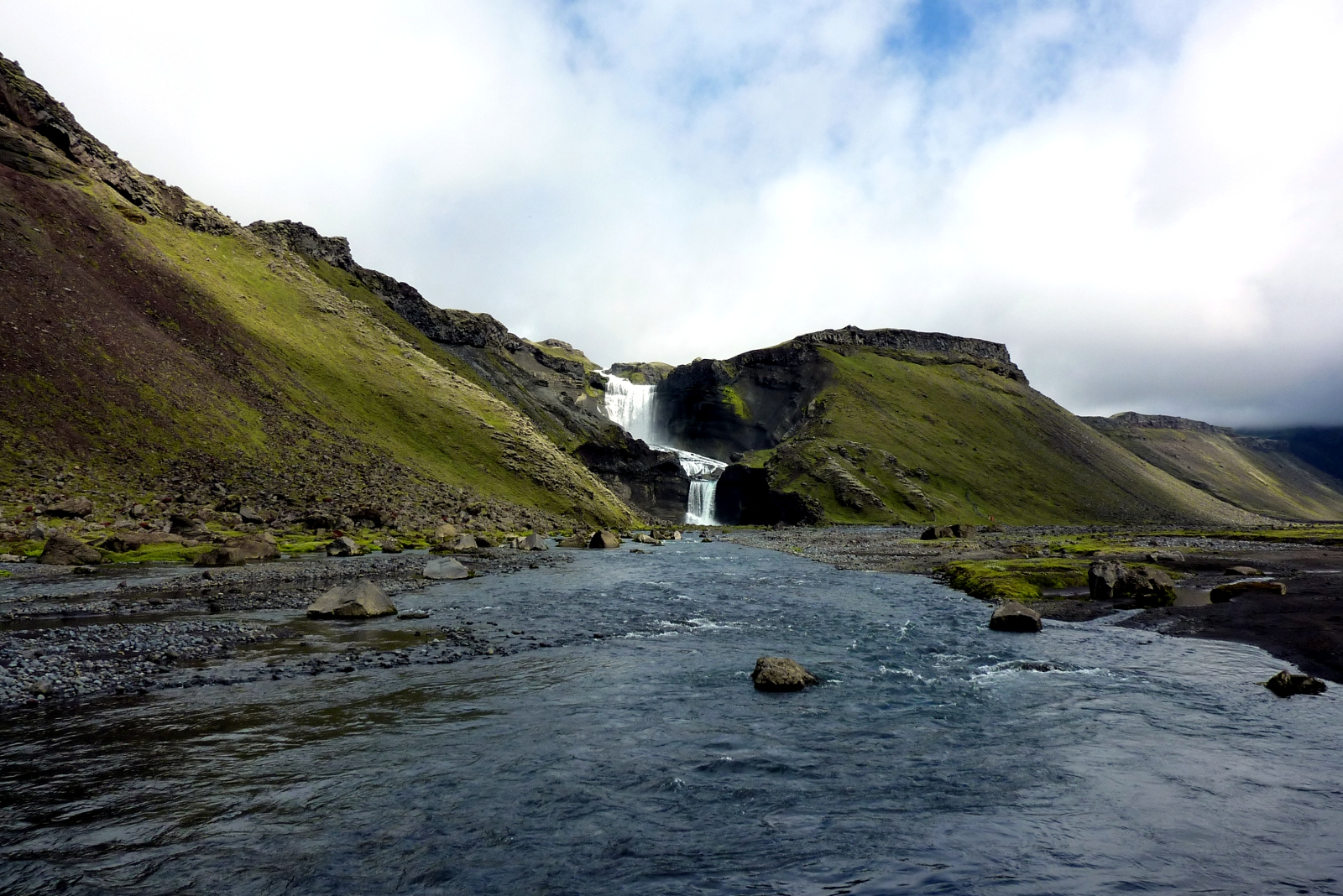
Ófærufoss in Eldgjá

Vatnajökull is Europe's largest glacier outside the arctic, with a surface area of 8,100 km^{2}. Generally measuring 400–600 m in thickness and at the most 950 m, the glacial ice conceals a number of mountains, valleys and plateaus. It even hides some active central volcanoes, of which Bárðarbunga is the largest and Grímsvötn the most active. While the icecap rises at its highest to over 2,000 m above sea level, the glacier base reaches its lowest point 300 m below sea level. Nowhere in Iceland, with the exception of Mýrdalsjökull glacier, does more precipitation fall or more water drain to the sea than on the south side of Vatnajökull. In fact, so much water is currently stored in Vatnajökull that the Icelandic river with the greatest flow, Ölfusá, would need over 200 years to carry this quantity of water to sea.

The scenery encircling the glacier is extremely varied. Towards the north, the highland plateau is divided by glacial rivers, with powerful flows in summer. The volcanoes of Askja, Kverkfjöll and Snæfell [ˈstnaiːˌfɛtl̥] tower over this region, together with the volcanic table mountain Herðubreið. Long ago, huge glacial floods carved out the canyon of Jökulsárgljúfur in the northern reaches of this plateau. The mighty Dettifoss waterfall still thunders into the upper end of this canyon, while the scenic formations at Hljóðaklettar [ˈl̥jouːðaˌkʰlɛhtar̥] and the horseshoe-curved cliffs of Ásbyrgi are found farther north.

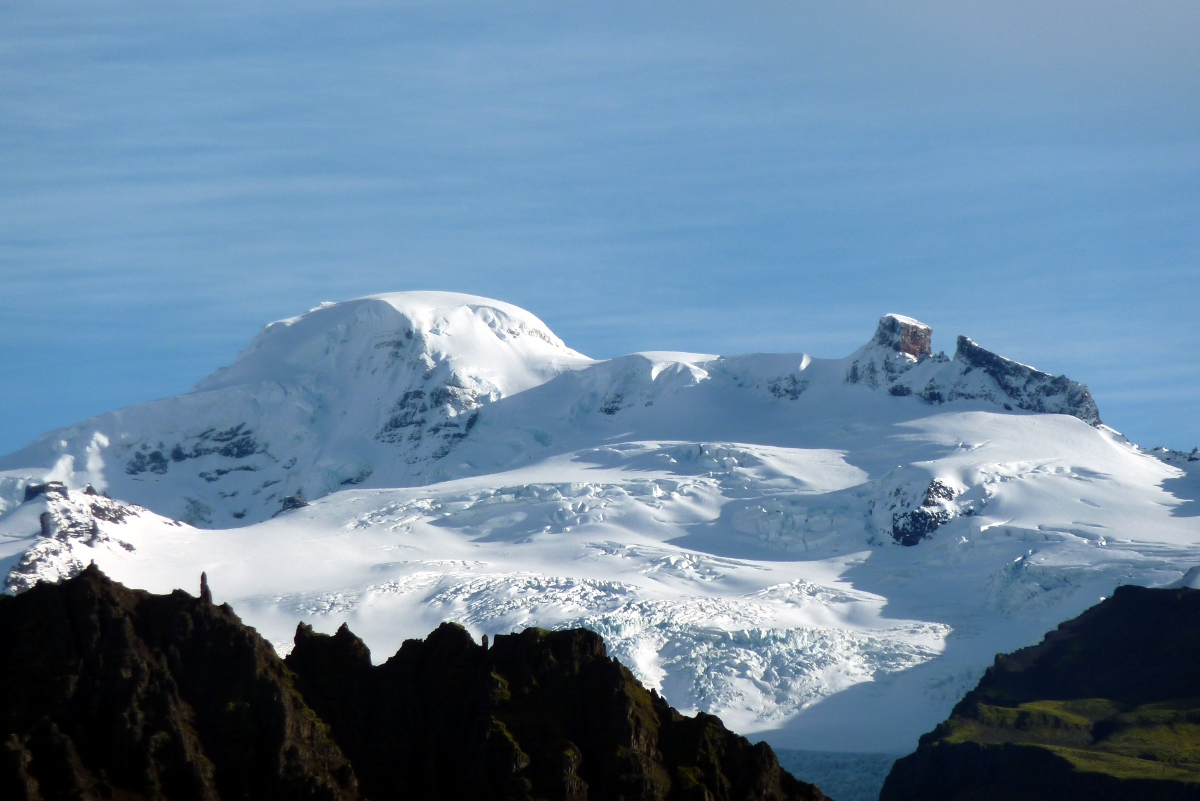
Öræfajökull and Hvannadalshnjúkur as seen from Skaftafell

Broad wetlands and expansive ranges distinguish the areas near the glacier and farther east, around Snæfell. These areas are an important habitat for reindeer and pink-footed geese.

The south side of Vatnajökull is characterised by many high, majestic mountain ridges, with outlet glaciers descending between them onto the lowlands. The southernmost part of the glacier envelops the central volcano Öræfajökull and Iceland's highest peak, Hvannadalshnjúkur. Sheltered by the high ice, the vegetated oasis of Skaftafell overlooks the black sands deposited to its west by the river Skeiðará. These sands are mostly composed of ash which stems from the frequent eruptions at Grímsvötn and is brought to the coast by jökulhlaups, or glacial floods.

Substantial volcanic activity also characterises the landscape west of Vatnajökull, where two of the world's greatest fissure and lava eruptions of historical times occurred, at Eldgjá in 934 and Lakagígar 1783–1784. Vonarskarð [ˈvɔːnarˌskarθ], northwest of the glacier, is a colourful high-temperature area and a watershed between North and South Iceland.

== Climate ==
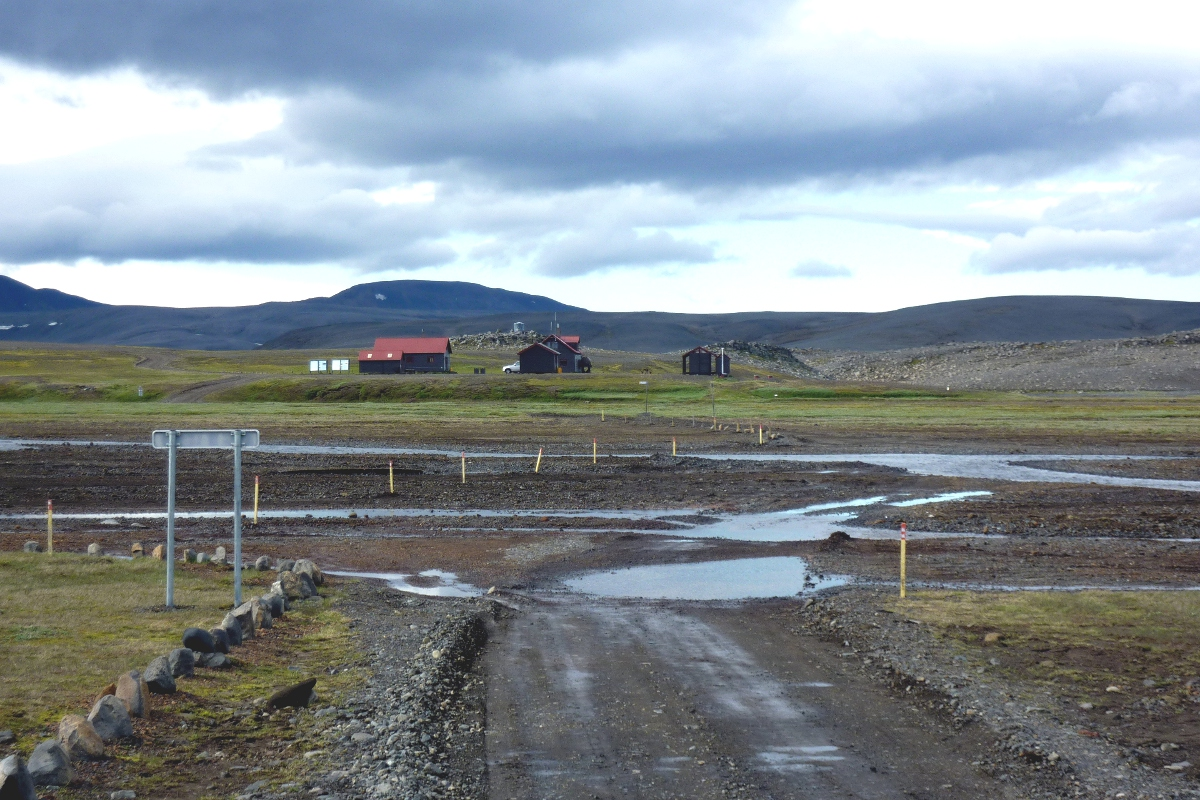
Nýidalur [ˈniːɪˌtaːlʏr̥] is located near the center of Iceland, on mountain track F26. Snowfall can be expected there any time of the year, so travelers must be well prepared and check the weather forecast before driving up there.

The weather can vary considerably in an area as extensive as that covered by the National Park with its wide range of elevations. Precipitation in low-lying areas south of the Vatnajökull ice cap is considerable, ranging from 1,000 mm a year to 3,000 mm per year. Temperatures range between 10 °C and 20 °C in summer, while winters are rather mild (the thermometer rarely falls below −10 °C and the temperature is often well above freezing point).

In the mountains and on the ice cap itself, annual precipitation can reach to between 4,000 and 5,000 mm, for the most part in the form of snow. The depth of snow on Öræfajökull after a high-precipitation winter is between 10 and 15 m. Some of the snow will melt, while the rest forms glacial ice. This process happens everywhere above the snowline on the Vatnajökull ice cap.

Temperatures on the southern part of the ice cap are almost always below zero in winter and can reach −20 °C or −30 °C. High winds and storms are common, and therefore wind-chill has to be taken into account as the wind can have a substantial effect on outdoor comfort, even when the ambient temperature is relatively high.

Further north beyond the ice cap, annual precipitation decreases. North-east of the ice cap it drops to between 350 and 450 mm per year, the lowest in Iceland. Precipitation increases closer to the north coast and in parts of the highlands such as at Askja. Temperatures can fall quite low in clear and calm weather during winter.

Southerly winds generally mean little or no precipitation in the north, along with higher temperatures. Northerly winds bring clouds, with cool and possibly wet weather in the north of the country, while the south is brighter and milder. The same applies to westerly or south westerly winds, which bring warmer weather in the east. The reverse is true of easterly winds, which bring coolness and precipitation in the east and dry, better weather in the west of Iceland. This is the result of the phenomenon of foehn wind. Humid, rather cool air rises as it nears the highlands; condensation then falls in the highlands as rain while warmer, drier air flows down to lower ground on the other side. The difference in temperature can be 10 °C or greater.

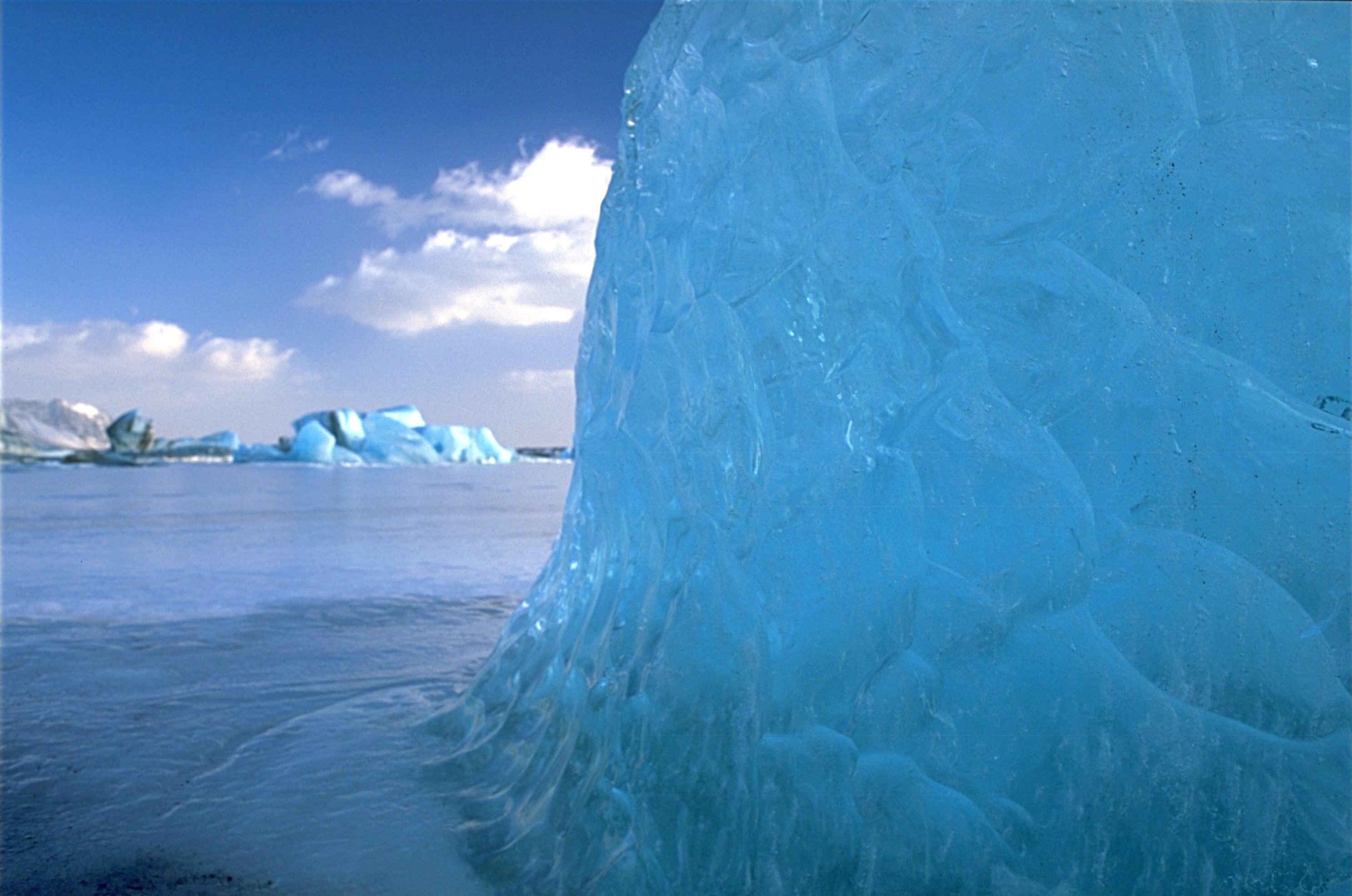
Blue ice iceberg in Jökulsárlón

== Operations and services ==
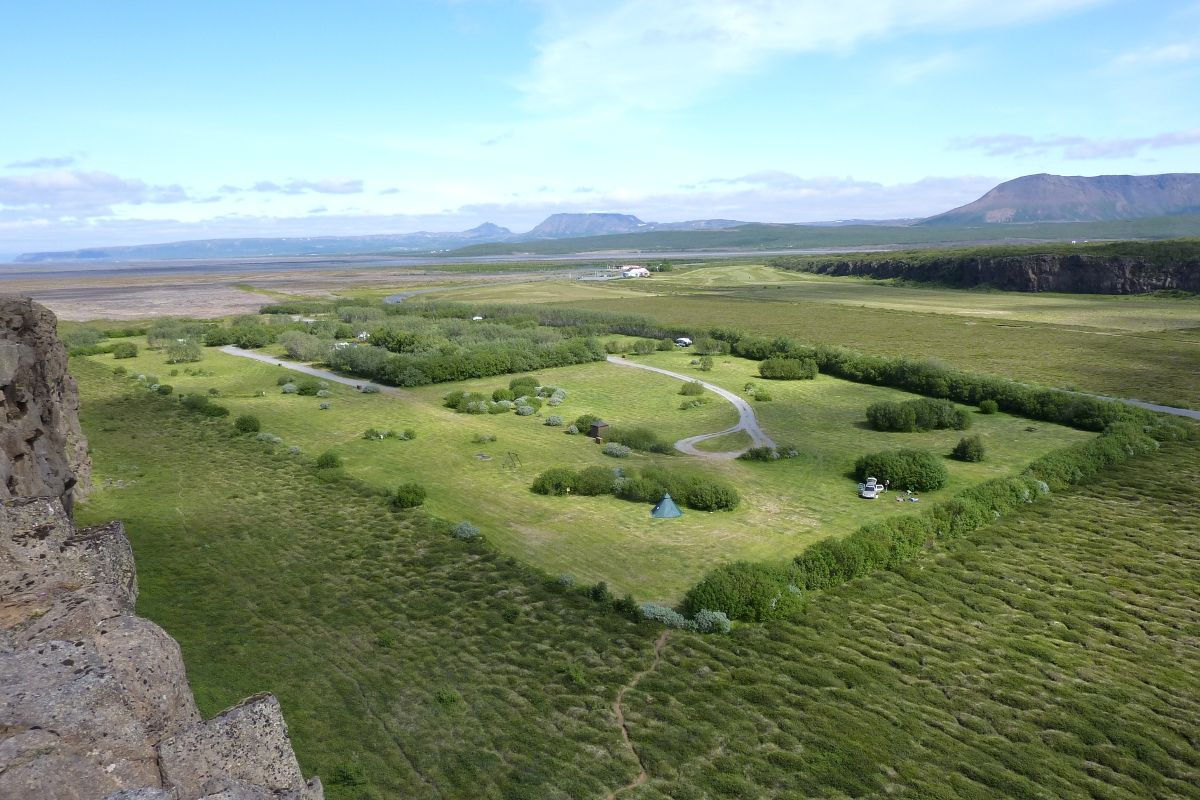
The campsite in Ásbyrgi. Vatnajökull National Park's visitor centre, Gljúfrastofa [ˈklju(v)raˌstɔːva], can be seen further away.

Vatnajökull National Park is divided into four territories, each of them locally managed.

The Northern Territory consists of north-western Vatnajökull, Askja caldera and its surroundings, Jökulsárgljúfur canyon and some of Jökulsá á Fjöllum riverbed. A visitor centre and a campsite are located in Ásbyrgi, along with a campsite in Vesturdalur [ˈvɛstʏrˌtaːlʏr̥].

The Eastern Territory includes Kverkfjöll mountains and north-eastern Vatnajökull, as well as the expanses of Snæfellsöræfi [ˈstnaiːˌfɛlsˌœːrˌaiːvɪ]. A visitor centre is located at Skriðuklaustur.

The Southern Territory extends throughout the south-eastern part of Vatnajökull, or from Lómagnúpur mountain in the west to Lón [ˈlouːn] and Lónsöræfi in the east. A visitor centre and a campsite are located in Skaftafell. Information centres in co-operation with the national park are run in Höfn, Hoffell, Hólmur [ˈhoulmʏr̥] and Skálafell [ˈskauːlaˌfɛtl̥].

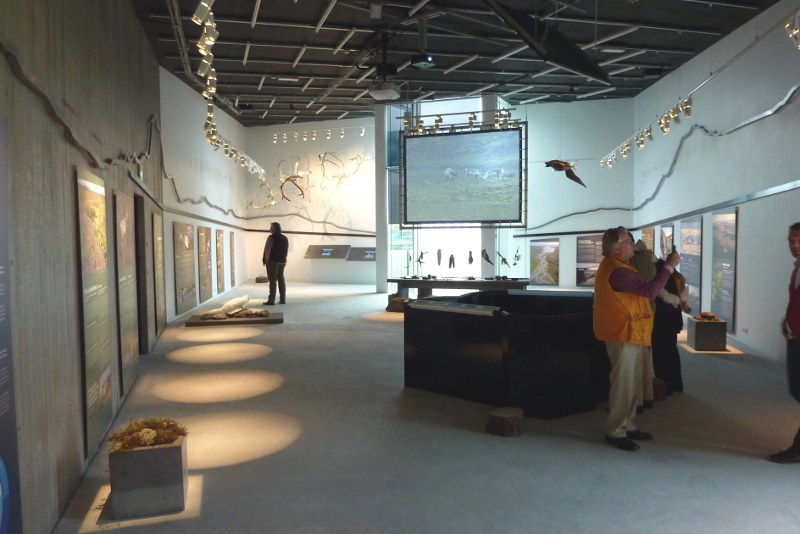
Snæfellsstofa [ˈstnaiːˌfɛlsˌstɔːva] is Vatnajökull National Park's most recent visitor centre.

The Western Territory extends over the south-western part of Vatnajökull and a large area outside the glacier, including Lakagígar craters and Langisjór. The Vatnajökull National Park Visitor Centre, which also serves as information centre for the Skaftárhreppur district, is located in Kirkjubæjarklaustur, jointly run by the national park and the local community.

The visitor centre in Skaftafell is open all year round. The visitor centres in Ásbyrgi and Skriðuklaustur are open from the beginning of May throughout September, but can be opened during winter on appointment. Most of the national park's highland area is however inaccessible during the winter.

National park rangers conduct patrols and provide educational services in the park's highland areas. The opening times of the stations vary from area to area, with the first rangers arriving when the relevant highland roads are opened, soon after the middle of June, and the last rangers leaving at the end of September.

During the summer, national park rangers offer short walks with an emphasis on nature interpretation. From mid-June to mid-August, rangers guide daily interpretive walks at Ásbyrgi and Skaftafell. In the highlands, most ranger stations offer daily interpretive walks from early July until mid-August.

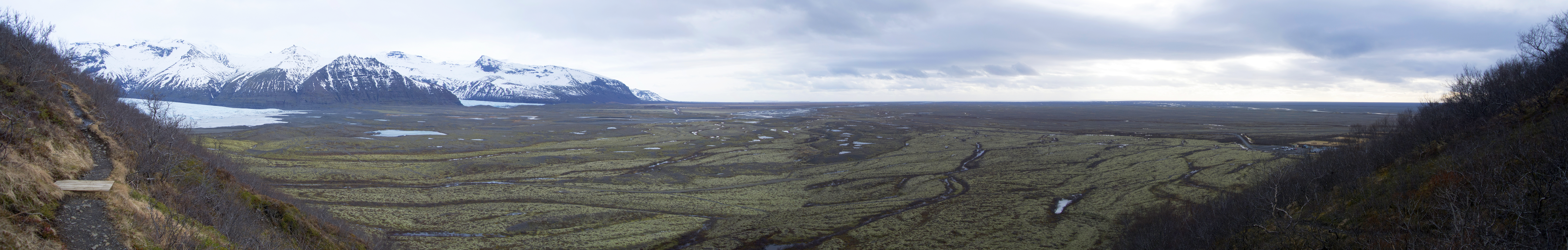
Vatnajökull National Park, 2014

== See also ==
- Vatnajökull
