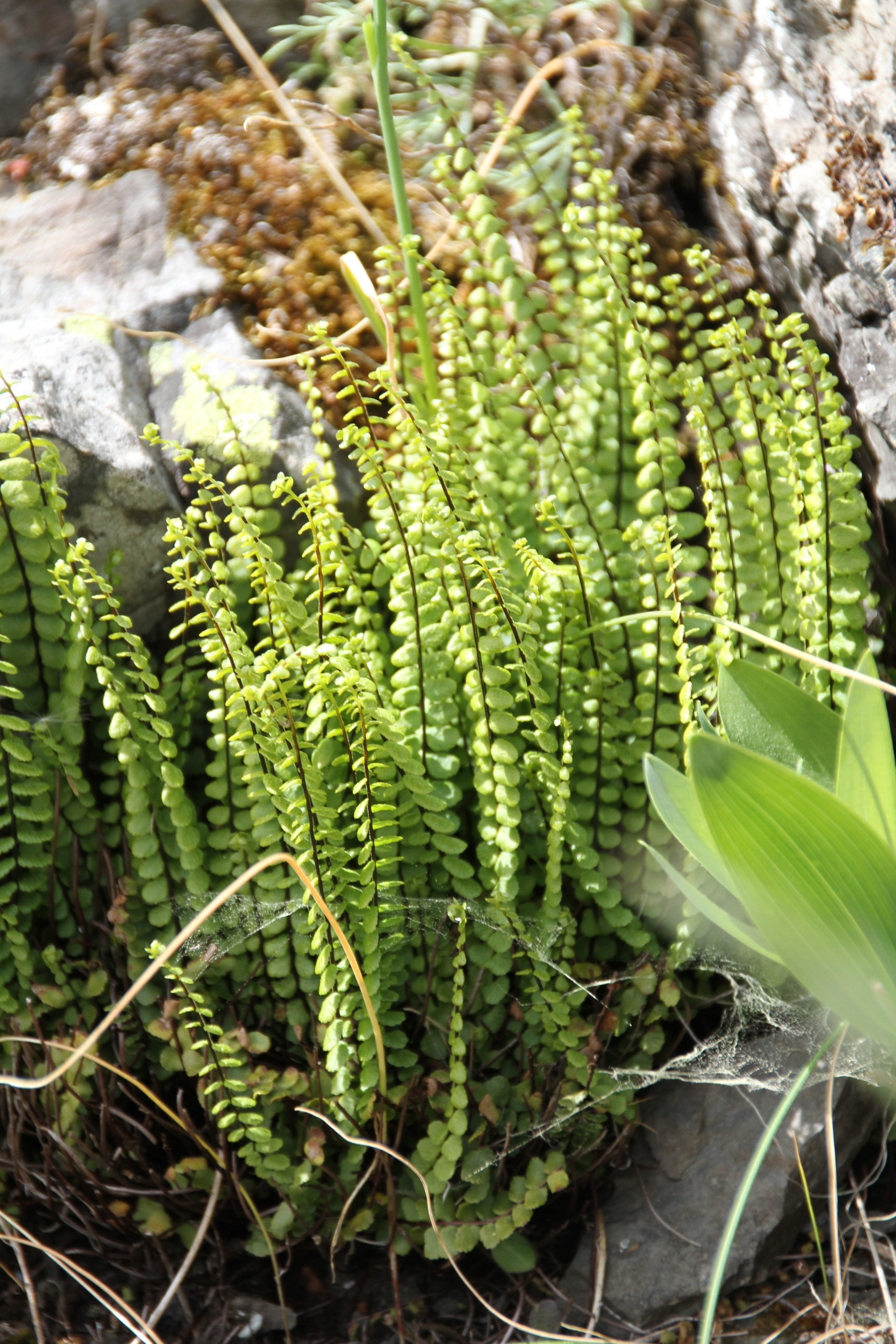
- Asplenium trichomanes subsp. trichomanes, Langaara, Oslo Fjord, Norway

Conservation status
- Secure (NatureServe)

Scientific classification
- Kingdom: Plantae
- Clade: Tracheophytes
- Division: Polypodiophyta
- Class: Polypodiopsida
- Order: Polypodiales
- Suborder: Aspleniineae
- Family: Aspleniaceae
- Genus: Asplenium
- Species: A. trichomanes

Binomial name
- Asplenium trichomanes L.

Infraspecific taxa
- See text

= Asplenium trichomanes =

Species of fern in the spleenwort family

Asplenium trichomanes, the maidenhair spleenwort (not to be confused with the similarly-named but very different maidenhair fern), is a small fern in the spleenwort genus Asplenium. It is a widespread and common species, occurring almost worldwide in a variety of rocky habitats. It is a variable fern with several subspecies.

The specific epithet trichomanes refers to a Greek word for fern.

== Description ==
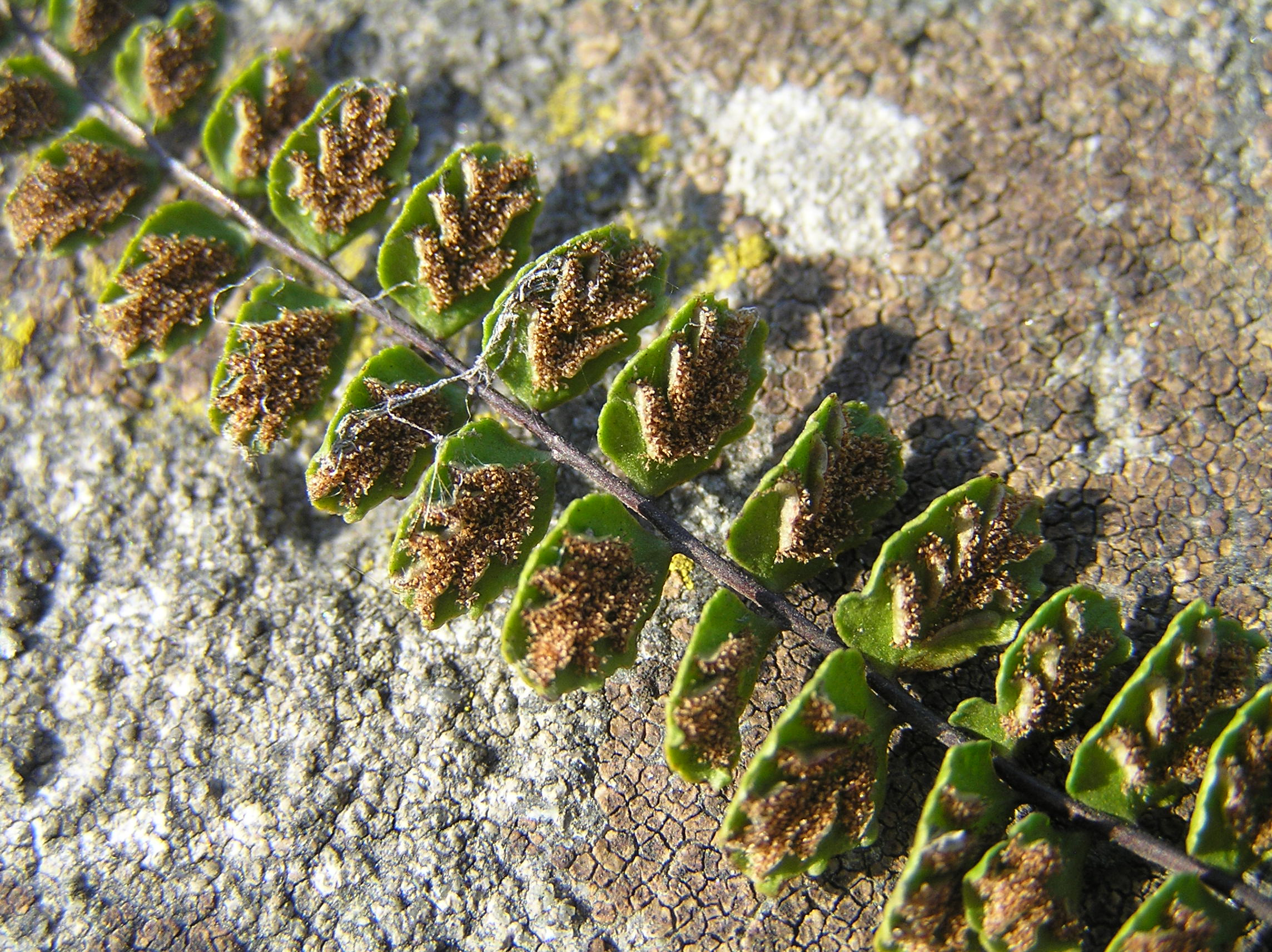
Sori on the underside of the frond

Asplenium trichomanes is a small plant forming tufts between 10 and 30 cm (3.9 and 11.8 in) tall, arising from a short, scaly rhizome. The scales are dark and the evergreen fronds are long and narrow, gradually tapering towards the tip. They are simply divided into small, yellow-green to dark-green, roundish leaflets or pinnae. The stipe and rachis of the frond are dark all along their length. The fronds can reach 40 cm (16 in) in length but are more commonly between 8 and 20 cm (3.1 and 7.9 in). The indusia are linear to oval, straight, and attached to the upper-side of the fertile vein. There are usually four to eight sori per pinna, and each may be up to 3.5 mm (0.14 in) long. The diploid (2n) chromosome count is 72. It is known to display foliage motion; in this regard it resembles the unrelated Codariocalyx motorius though this has its leaflets in motion much of the time.

== Distribution and habitat ==
It is widespread in temperate and subarctic areas and also occurs in mountainous regions in the tropics. Its range includes most of Europe and much of Asia south to Turkey, Iran and the Himalayas with a population in Yemen. It occurs in northern, southern and parts of eastern Africa and also in eastern Indonesia, south-east Australia, Tasmania, New Zealand and Hawaii. It is found in North America and Central America and Cuba, and the northern and western regions of South America such as Chile. Even though its range is wide spread, it is often rare, and populations are widely spread out from each other based on the availability of suitable habitat.

It grows in rocky habitats such as cliffs, scree slopes, walls and mine waste, the type of rock used as a substrate depending on the subspecies. It grows from sea-level up to 3000 metres in North America while in the British Isles it reaches 870 metres.

In the US state of Minnesota A. trichomanes is listed as a threatened species. It occurs on ledges and in crevices on moist, east-facing cliffs and occasionally on talus with similar conditions. The Minnesota populations are Asplenium trichomanes subsp. trichomanes.

== Taxonomy ==
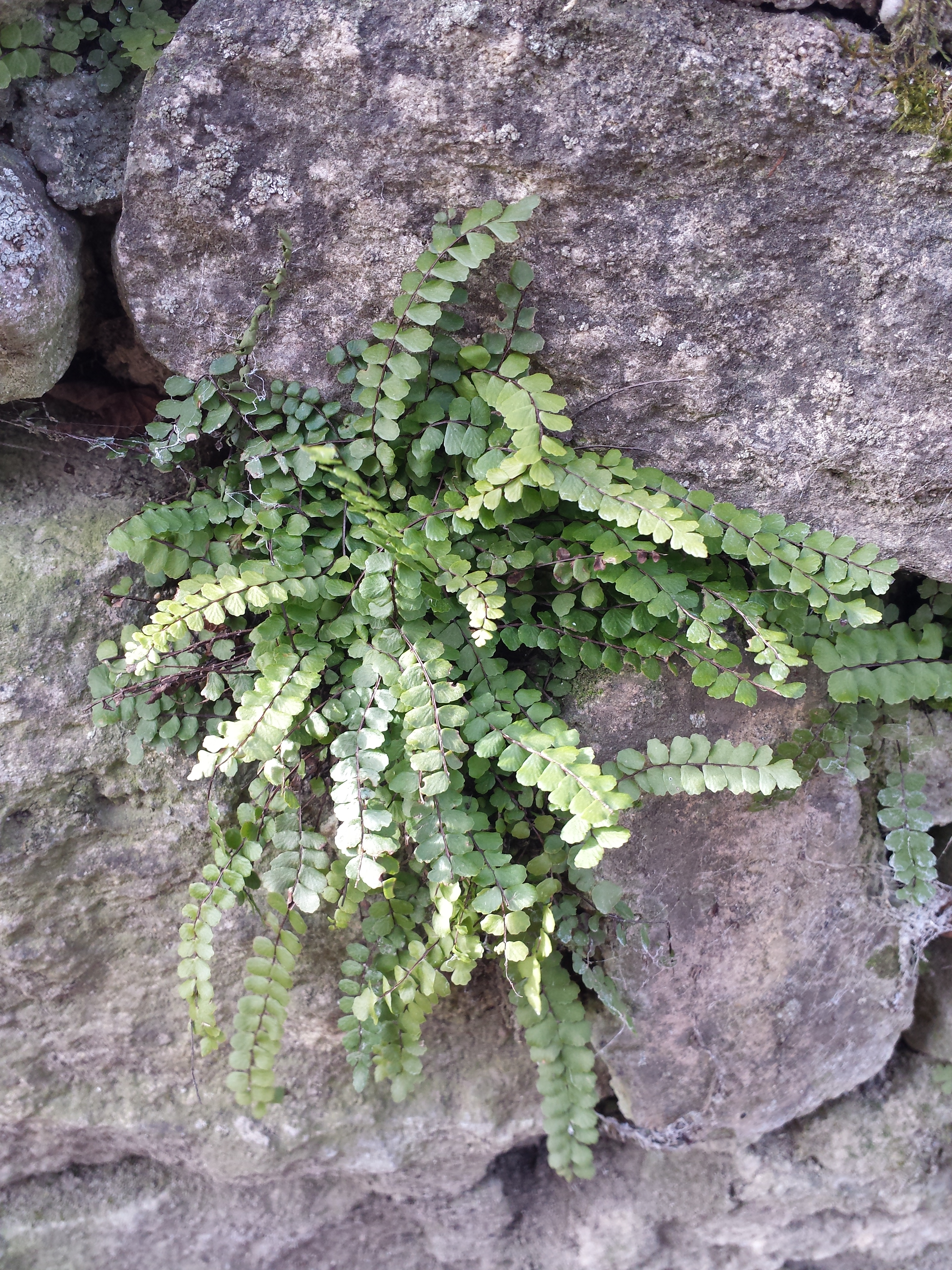
Asplenium trichomanes subsp. quadrivalens, Austria

Linnaeus was the first to describe maidenhair spleenwort with the binomial Asplenium trichomanes in his Species Plantarum of 1753.

Asplenium trichomanes has diploid, tetraploid and hexaploid cytotypes, which it has been argued should be recognised as distinct species. A triploid cytotype (a sterile hybrid between the diploid and tetraploid cytotype) is also known. Within these cytotypes several subspecies are recognised. Plants of the World Online accepts 20 infraspecific subdivisions as of February 2025. These include:

- Asplenium trichomanes subsp. trichomanes prefers acidic rocks such as sandstone, basalt and granite. In Europe and North America it is most often found in mountainous areas and is commonest in the north. It is a delicate plant with a slender stipe and rachis and relatively few pinnae. Diploid.
- Asplenium trichomanes subsp. quadrivalens D.E.Mey. prefers calcareous rocks such as limestone and dolomite and often grows on the mortar in walls. It is commoner than A. t. subsp. trichomanes in much of Europe but is less widespread in North America, although it is present in southern North America where ssp. trichomanes is absent. Compared to the nominate subspecies it is stouter and has more pinnae which are more square in shape and have less of a stalk. The fronds tend to grow close to the rock while those of A. t. subsp. trichomanes tend to arch away. Tetraploid.
- Asplenium trichomanes subsp. pachyrachis (Christ) Lovis & Reichst. (syn. Asplenium csikii) is mainly found on limestone rocks and walls. It is small and delicate, grows close to the rock and has a rigid, fragile stipe and rachis. Tetraploid.
- Asplenium trichomanes subsp. coriaceifolium Rasbach, K.Rasbach, Reichst. & Bennert (syn. Asplenium azomanes): Mallorca, Spain, Morocco. Tetraploid.
- Asplenium trichomanes subsp. densum (Brack.) W.H.Wagner – Hawaiian Islands
- Asplenium trichomanes subsp. hastatum (Christ) S.Jess.. Tetraploid.
- Asplenium trichomanes subsp. humistratum (Ching) Fraser-Jenk.
- Asplenium trichomanes subsp. inexpectans Lovis. Diploid.
- Asplenium trichomanes subsp. kulumyssiense Stepanov
- Asplenium trichomanes subsp. maderense Gibby & Lovis. Madeira, Azores. Hexaploid. Hexaploids also occur in Australia and New Zealand.
- Asplenium trichomanes nothosubsp. barraraense Rasbach, K.Rasbach, Reichst. & Bennert. Tetraploid (coraceifolium × quadrivalens) – Balearic Islands
- Asplenium trichomanes nothosubsp. lovisianum. Tetraploid (hastatum × quadrivalens).
- Asplenium trichomanes nothosubsp. lucanum Cubas, Rosselló & Pangua – Balearic Islands
- Asplenium trichomanes nothosubsp. lusaticum (D.E.Mey.) Lawalrée. Triploid (trichomanes × quadrivalens).
- Asplenium trichomanes nothosubsp. malacitense Rasbach, K.Rasbach, Reichst. & Bennert. Triploid (coraceifolium × inexpectans).
- Asplenium trichomanes nothosubsp. melzeri Lovis, Rasbach & Reichst.. Triploid (quadrivalens × inexpectans).
- Asplenium trichomanes nothosubsp. melzerianum S.Jess.. Triploid (hastatum × inexpectans).
- Asplenium trichomanes nothosubsp. moravicum S.Jess.. Tetraploid (hastatum × pachyrachis).
- Asplenium trichomanes nothosubsp. staufferi Lovis & Reichst.. Tetraploid (pachyrachis × quadrivalens).
- Asplenium trichomanes nothosubsp. tadei-reichsteinii S.Jess.. Triploid (pachyrachis × inexpectans).

== Cultivation ==
Asplenium trichomanes is valued in cultivation for its hardiness (down to −20 °C (−4 °F)), its evergreen foliage and its ability to colonise crevices in stone walls. It prefers a fully or partially shaded aspect. It has gained the Royal Horticultural Society's Award of Garden Merit.
