= Rugbyfélag Reykjavíkur =

- Nickname: Reykjavík Raiders
- Founded: 2010
- Location: Reykjavík, Iceland
- Ground(s): Safamýri, Kaplakriki
- President: Birnir Orri Pétursson
Team kit

Rugbyfélag Reykjavíkur (Reykjavík Raiders) is the first registered and officially recognized rugby team in Iceland, both with the Icelandic sport authority (The National Olympic and Sports Association of Iceland) as well as Rugby Europe. The Raiders are situated in Reykjavík and have regular training sessions for both men and women as well as being active in raising rugby development and awareness in Iceland.

Their development program holds regular presentations in schools as well as hosting open introductory sessions for new players.

The Club fields both a 7s and a 15s team.

== History ==
The club was founded in 2010 and competed for the first time in the Scandinavian Sevens in Copenhagen, Denmark in August of that year. This was the first time an Icelandic rugby team had played anywhere abroad. The Raiders have been regulars in Copenhagen ever since.

Sunday 3 July 2011, was an historic date for the development of rugby union in Iceland and a major milestone for the Reykjavík Raiders. This was the date of the first 15s match played by the club and the first ever match played on Icelandic soil. The game was played against the Thunderbird Old boys from Phoenix (Arizona) at the Valur sports complex in Reykjavík. This was an important step for the Icelandic team that ended with an Icelandic win.

2013 Was an incredibly important year for the development of the Raiders club and rugby in Iceland. The Icelandic Exiles rugby team was created as a touring club for Icelandic and international players for occasions which did not warrant a full Raiders team. The Icelandic Exiles in their first years had players from Iceland, Ireland, Australia, the U.S. and Japan to name a few. The tour started in Canada before traveling by bus to the United States, playing six 15s games on the way before participating in the Vegas HSBC Invitational Rugby Tournament. Members of the Reykjavík Raiders have attended several tournaments since then under as the Exiles with players from all over the world. Also in 2013 The Icelandic National Rugby Team (which in those first several years was made entirely out of Raiders players) played its first official rugby 7s tournament. The FIRA-AER Rugby 7s tournament was held on Saturday the 1st of June in Riga, Latvia. The national team continued its participation in the FIRA-AER Rugby 7s tournament, remaining an active participant (as FIRA-AER became Rugby Europe) until the 2018 tournament in Estonia. After the 2018 tournament, Rugby Europe reshuffled the tournament organization following rugby 7s inauguration as an Olympic sport which resulted in several national teams (Iceland included) being cut from the tournament.

In later years the Reykjavík Raiders have continued to develop and have played regular international games both abroad and in Iceland. They are currently one of only three rugby clubs in Reykjavík.

During the COVID-19 pandemic the club was not allowed to train for almost two years and as a result suffered a loss in registered members. Furthermore, several key players and organizers moved abroad during this period which delayed the resurgence of the club. Since autumn of 2021 the Raiders have been fully active and developing in numbers and ambition, achieving full 15s team numbers in 2023 during which the Raiders played three matches against visiting international teams in Iceland. Winning two out of three.

== Current squad ==
Current Squad (2024)
Player	Position	Height	Weight	Date of birth	Caps	Nationality
Alexandre Paumier	Prop	1.85 m (6 ft 1 in)	105 kg (231 lb)	01.06.1997	4	Luxembourg
André Ventura	Prop	1.80 m (5 ft 11 in)	100 kg (220 lb)	22.11.1994	0	Portugal
Florin-Robertino Alexa	Prop	1.82 m (6.0 ft) 11 1/2 in)	103 kg (227 lb)	27.01.1979	5	Romania
Kristján Wales	Hooker	1.80 m (5 ft 11 in)	110 kg (240 lb)	16.04.1997	6	Iceland
Daníel Árnason	Hooker	1.79 m (5.9 ft) 10 1/2 in)	99 kg (218 lb)	28.01.2001	0	Iceland
Höskuldur Sylvain	Hooker	1.70 m (5 ft 7 in)	98 kg (216 lb)	20.09.1985	21	Iceland
Birnir Pétursson	Lock	1.95 m (6 ft 5 in)	118 kg (260 lb)	25.06.1985	46	Iceland
Þorkell Guðnason	Lock	1.95 m (6 ft 5 in)	135 kg (298 lb)	21.03.1987	21	Iceland
Orri Viðarsson	Lock	1.98 m (6 ft 6 in)	118 kg (260 lb)	01.03.1994	18	Iceland
Michael Nestor	Lock	1.95 m (6 ft 5 in)	100 kg (220 lb)	20.05.1996	2	(Republic of Ireland) Ireland
Thomas Clogan	Loose Forward	1.94 m (6.4 ft) 4 1/2 in)	110 kg (240 lb)	15.02.1987	5	(United States) USA
Björn Lerm	Loose Forward	1.88 m (6 ft 2 in)	95 kg (209 lb)	07.07.1996	2	South Africa
Henning Sørensen	Loose Forward	1.88 m (6 ft 2 in)	97 kg (214 lb)	26.04.1979	16	Denmark
Radosław Jasiński	Loose Forward	1.90 m (6 ft 3 in)	103 kg (227 lb)	22.10.1988	3	Poland
Sean Wales	Loose Forward	1.85 m (6 ft 1 in)	90 kg (200 lb)	06.05.2004	2	Uganda
Antoine Cordier	Scrum-half	1.80 m (5 ft 11 in) )	83 kg (183 lb)	14.12.1985	6	France
Christopher Long	Scrum-half	1.73 m (5 ft 8 in)	76 kg (168 lb)	18.12.1994	1	Scotland
Romain Lasseur	Fly-half	1.72 m (5.6 ft) 8 ¾ in)	78 kg (172 lb)	11.04.1993	4	France
Phillip Kendrick (C)	Fly-half	1.73 m (5 ft 8 in)	108 kg (238 lb)	13.05.1981	18	Wales
Heiðar Heiðarson	Centre	1.81 m (5.9 ft) 11 1/2 in)	93 kg (205 lb)	19.09.1973	24	Iceland
Martin Nizon	Centre	1.83 m (6.0 ft)	80 kg (180 lb)	29.10.2002	0	France
Ágúst Ágústsson	Centre	1.80 m (5 ft 11 in)	88 kg (194 lb)	16.11.2001	4	Iceland
Ruairi Hanlon	Centre	1.79 m (5.9 ft) 10 1/2 in)	80 kg (180 lb)	21.09.2005	0	(Republic of Ireland) Ireland
Thejus Venkatesh	Wing	1.75 m (5 ft 9 in)	75 kg (165 lb)	14.05.1995	5	India
Áki Jarl Láruson	Wing	1.77 m (5.8 ft) 9 1/2 in)	87 kg (192 lb)	25.11.1985	4	Iceland
Sebastían Sigurðarson	Wing	1.85 m (6 ft 1 in)	82 kg (181 lb)	17.03.2001	0	Iceland
Egill Helgason	Full-back	1.90 m (6 ft 3 in)	80 kg (180 lb)	04.04.2001	3	Iceland
Guillaume Janson	Full-back	1.84 m (6.0 ft) ¼ in)	84 kg (185 lb)	01.07.1991	2	France

Staff
Name	Position
Birnir Pétursson	Club President
Phillip Kendrick	Head coach
Kristján Wales	Strength and Conditioning Coach
Cécile Dargentolle	Assistant Coach (Backline)
Thomas Clogane	Assistant Coach (Forwards)
Didier Roulin	Logistics Manager
Fearghus Omaitiu	Team Physiotherapist
Höskuldur Dutilh	Event Manager
Tómas Gunnar Tómasson	Disciplinary Advisor
