= Safnahúsið =

Coordinates: 64.147419°N 21.932283°W

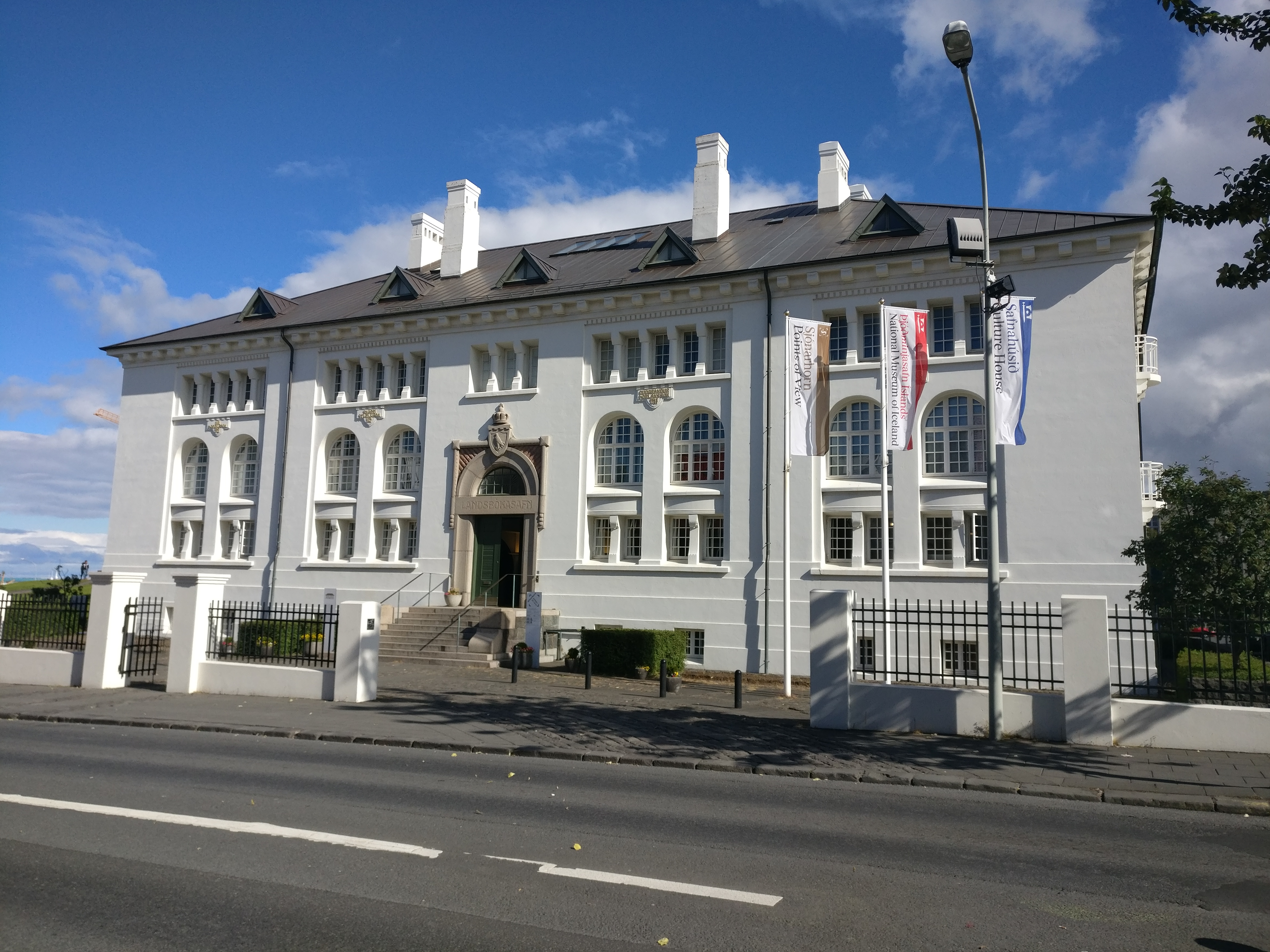
The Culture House

Safnahúsið (Icelandic pronunciation: [ˈsapnaˌhuːsɪθ], meaning "the Culture House"), but called "the House of Collections" in English, formerly Þjóðmenningarhúsið [ˈθjouðˌmɛnːiŋkarˌhuːsɪθ], is an exhibition space in Reykjavík, Iceland, which houses an exhibition, Points of View, drawn from various national museums and other cultural institutions. It has been part of the National Museum of Iceland since 2013. The director is Markús Þór Andrésson. The building, Hverfisgata 15, was constructed to house the National Library and at one time also housed a number of other museums.

== Building ==
Safnahúsið was constructed in 1906–08 to a design by the Danish architect Johannes Magdahl Nielsen, to house the National Library (now combined with the library of the University of Iceland to form the National and University Library of Iceland) and the National Archives. The façade is decorated with crests bearing the names of literary figures. It was originally to be built of dolerite, like the parliament house, and to have a copper roof, but this was judged to be too expensive so the building was instead constructed of concrete with an iron roof. It was at the time one of the largest and finest buildings in the country.

== Former uses ==
The National Library, which had been in the parliament building since 1881, moved into the building in 1909 and was housed there until 1994, when it was combined with the university library and moved into a new building.

The National Archives, which had been in the parliament building since 1900, moved into the building in 1909 and were housed there until 1987.

The Museum of Antiquities, later renamed the National Museum of Iceland, moved into the building in 1908; it had previously been housed in various locations including Reykjavík Cathedral and the parliament building. It moved to its own building in 1950.

The Natural History Museum of Iceland also moved into the building in 1908. In 1947 the Icelandic Natural History Society handed the exhibition over to the state, but it was closed in 1960 because of lack of space. It reopened in 1967 at a temporary location.

== Current uses ==
Main Entrance

The building was renamed the Culture House and has since hosted a variety of exhibits. An exhibit by the National and University Library opened in 2000, an exhibit of manuscripts from the Árni Magnússon Institute for Icelandic Studies opened in 2002, and the National Museum has mounted exhibitions there. In 2009 there was a temporary exhibition of photographs by the novelist Halldór Laxness, during Hönnunarmars (Design March) in 2014, Sigríður Rún Kristinsdóttir gave a workshop titled "Anatomy of Letters", and in 2012 French artist Anne Herzog showed Islande-Isräel there.

In Spring 2012, the former reading room served as the court room for the trial of former Prime Minister Geir Haarde by the Landsdómur on charges of misconduct while in office.

In Spring 2014, the institution reverted to its former name of Safnahúsið.

A new permanent exhibit on the visual history of Iceland called Points of View, curated by director Markús Þór Andrésson, opened in April 2015. It draws primarily from the National Museum, the National Gallery and the Natural History Museum, together with the National Archives, the National and University Library and the Árni Magnússon Institute.
