= Reykjavík Green Days =

The Reykjavík Green Days is an annual event which takes place in Reykjavík, Iceland. This event was founded by a group of students at the University of Iceland in the Environmental and Natural resources program.

"Gaia", as the group is known, aims to raise awareness. It also works to stimulate citizens, businesses, non-governmental organizations, local authorities and other urban actors to improve the environment's quality by implementing changes in behavior.

The event runs across several days in March.

It's considered by the Reykjavík town Council an environmental education initiative that encourages all stakeholders to take steps towards becoming more environmentally responsible.

The initiate has been organized by the SEED Iceland association in collaboration with other minor local institutions. The staff has been made up of people with 9 nationalities and so the event has been a relevant tourist attraction. The most important happening of the 2009 edition was the Reykjavík critical mass, which was actually the first one in Iceland.
