= Reykjavík =

Capital and most populous city of Iceland

- Capital city and Municipality
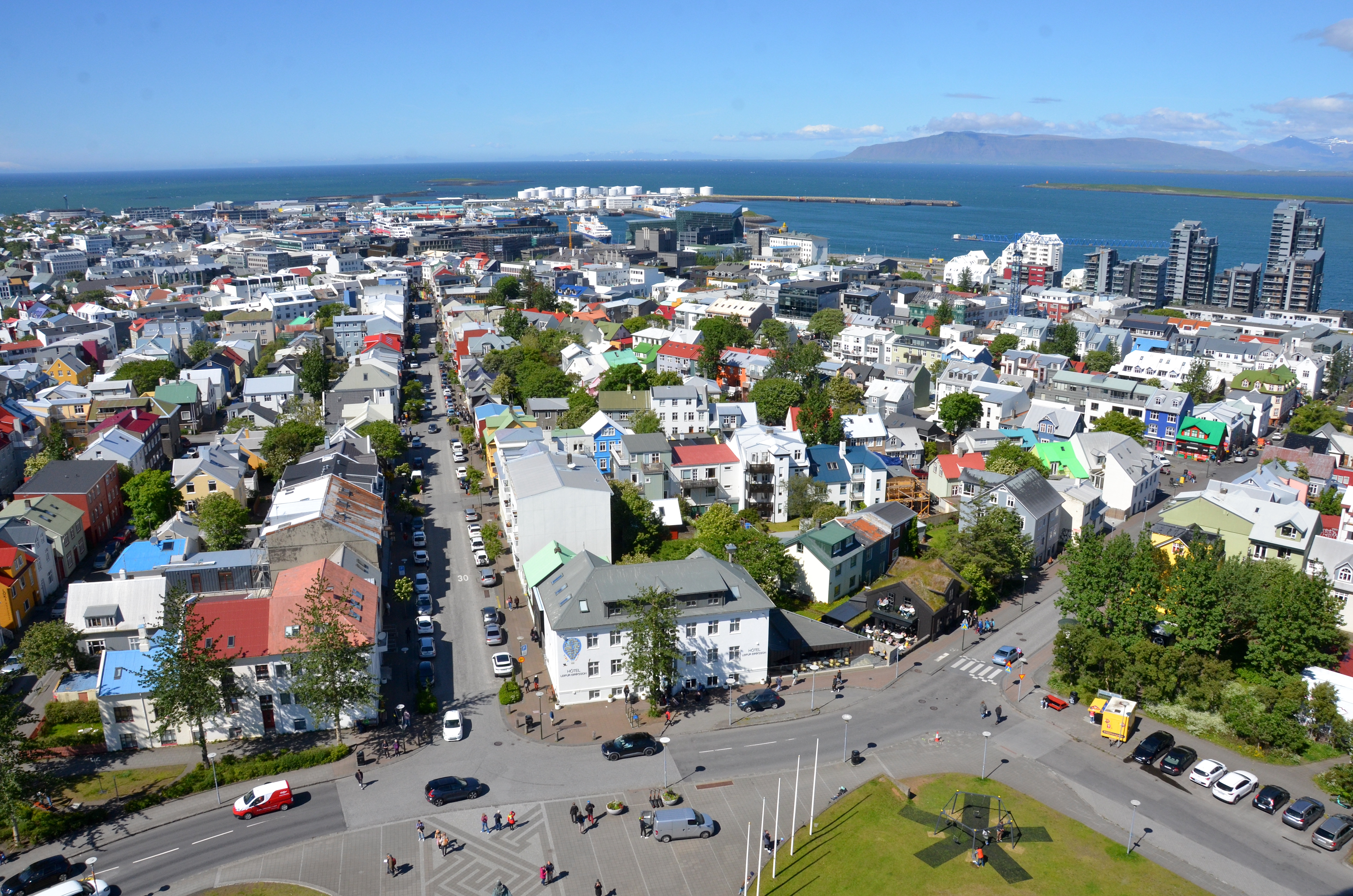
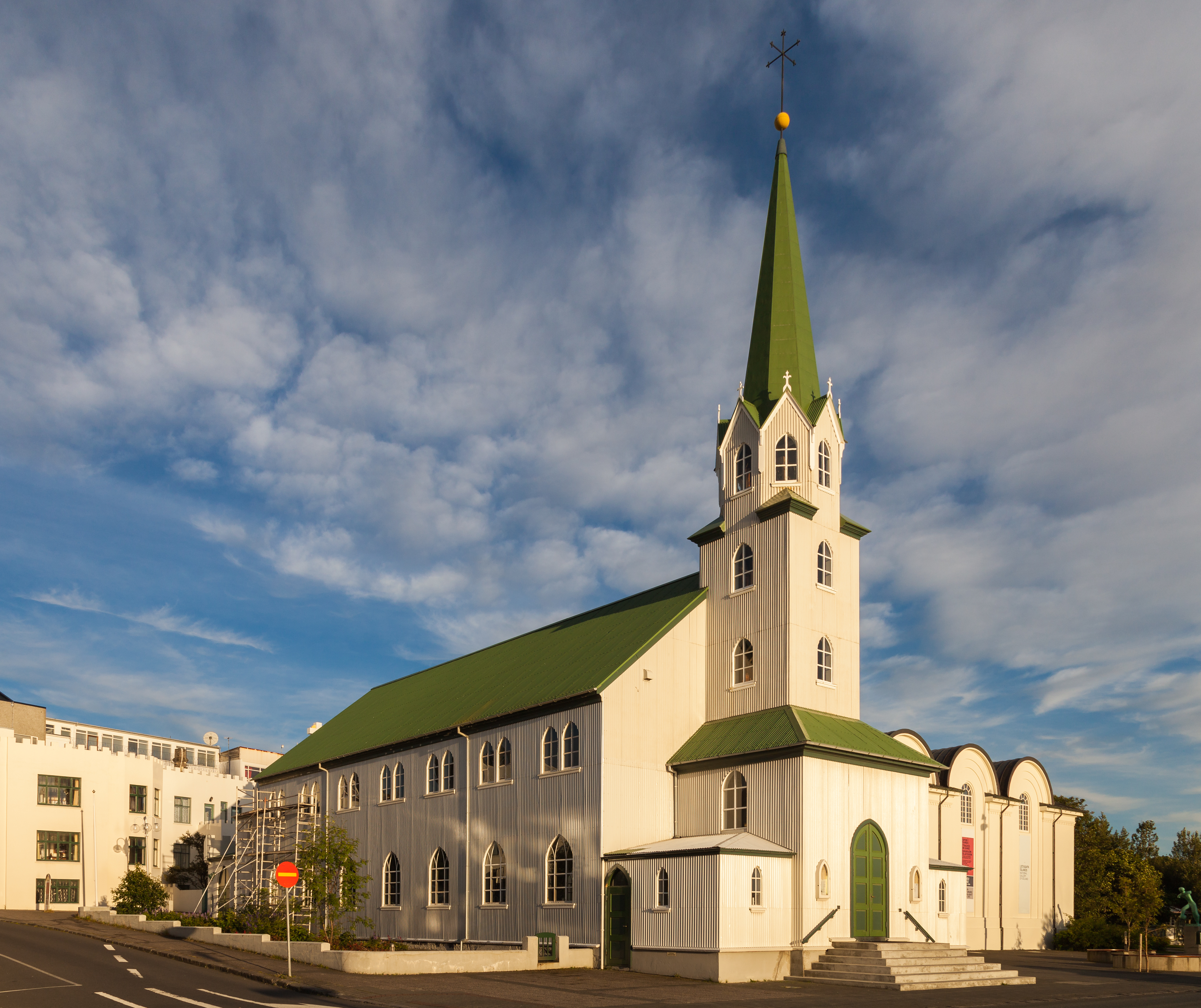
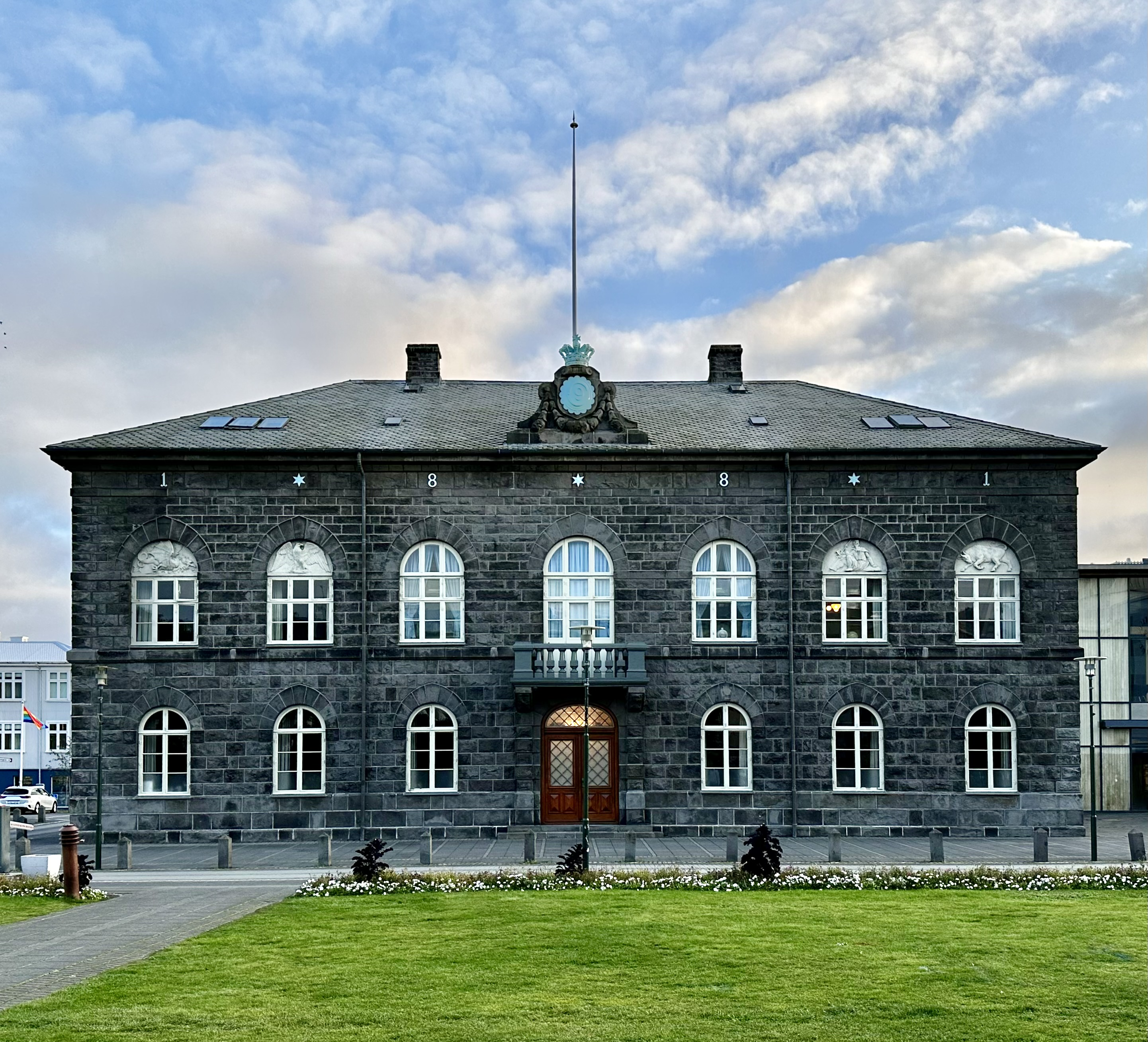
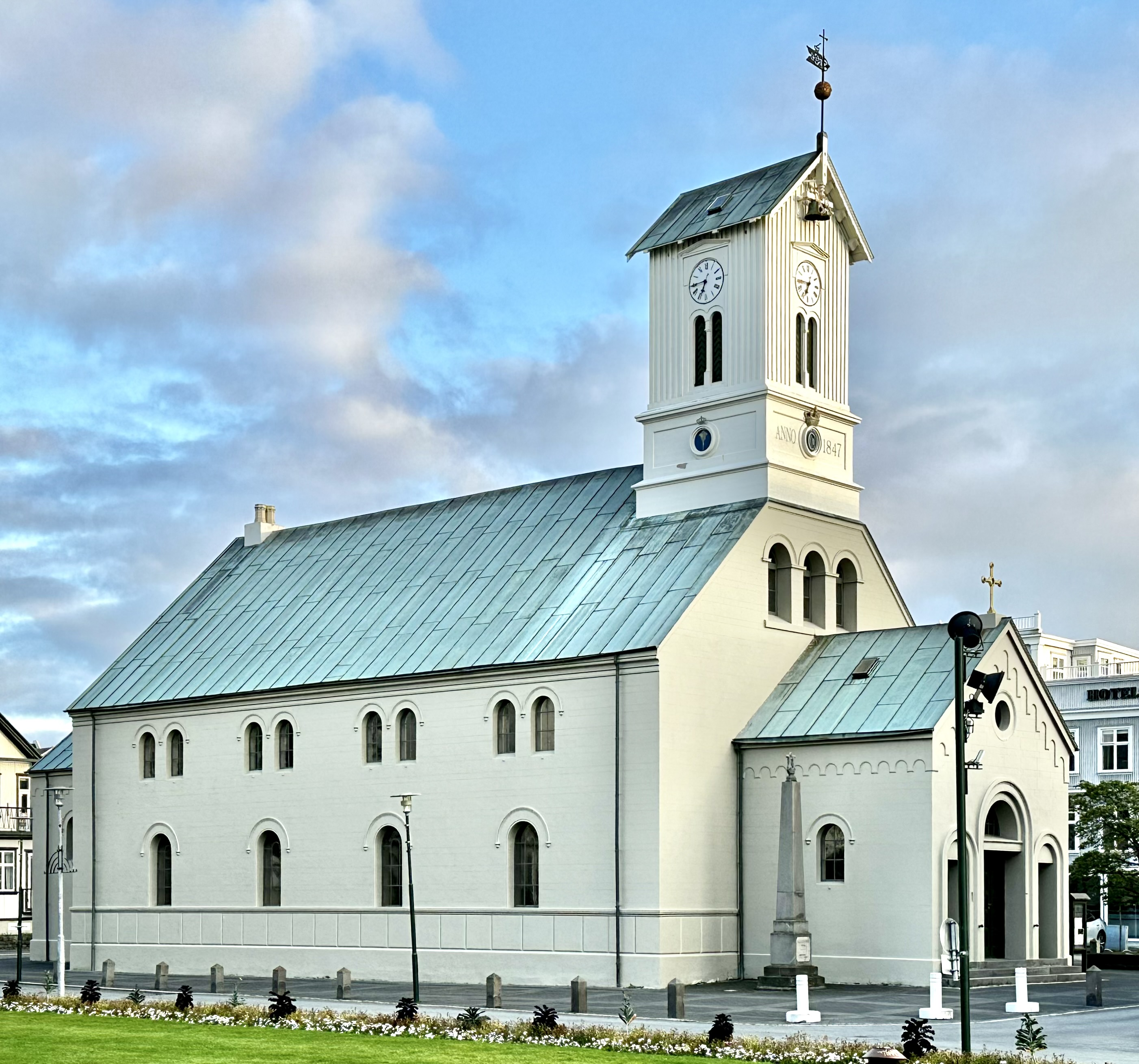
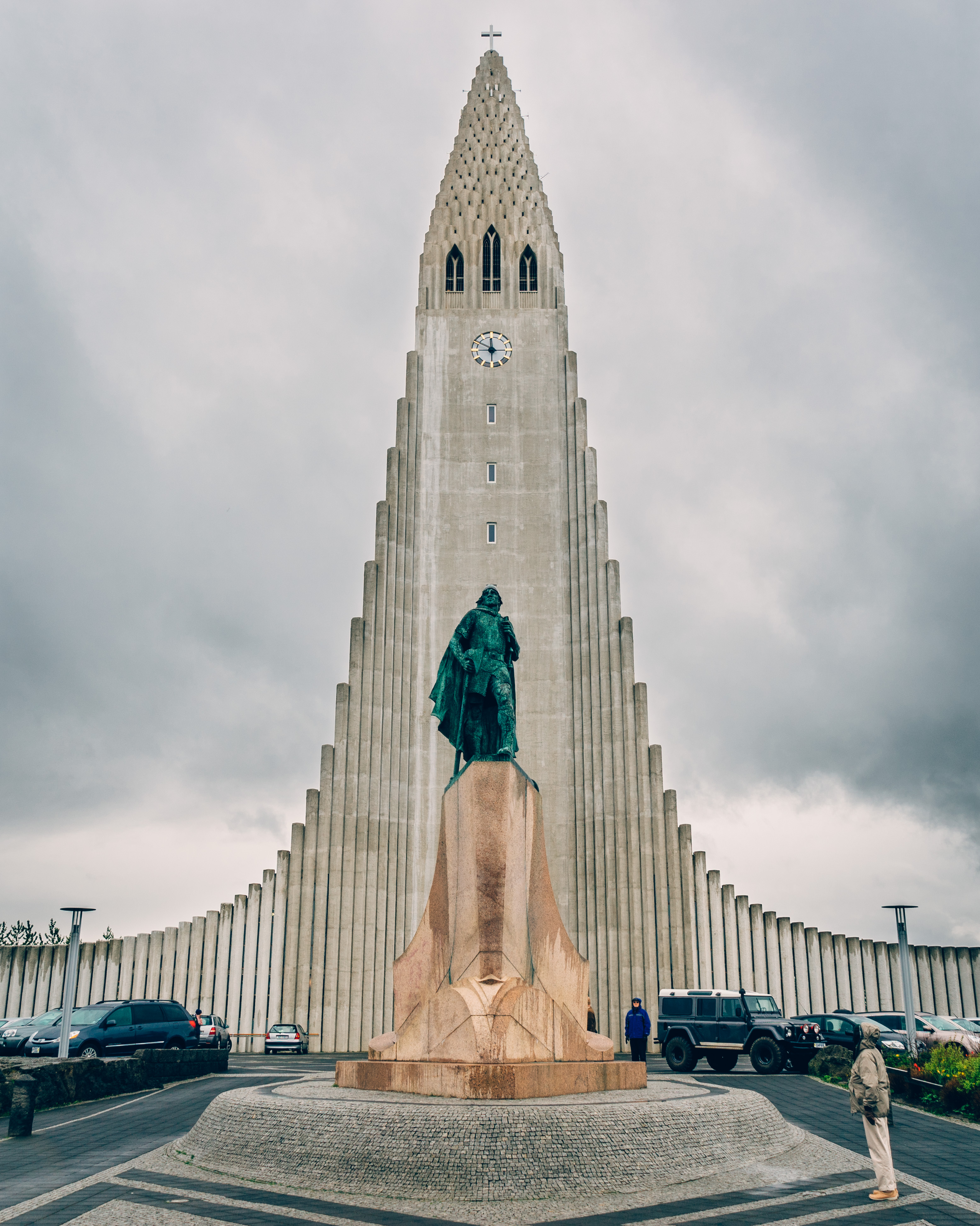
- Skyline from the Hallgrímskirkja Höfði Perlan Fríkirkjan í Reykjavík Alþingishúsið Reykjavík Cathedral Harpa Hallgrímskirkja

- Flag Coat of arms
- Etymology: Old Norse: "Smoky bay"
- Nickname: The City of Sagas – Referring to Iceland's rich literary history, especially the famous Icelandic sagas that tell stories of Viking life and history.
- Location of Reykjavík

- Location within Iceland Location within Europe
- Coordinates: 64°08′45″N 21°56′33″W
- Country: Iceland
- Region: Capital Region
- Constituency: Reykjavík Constituency North; Reykjavík Constituency South
- Market right: 18 August 1786

Government
  - Type: Council–manager
  - Body: City Council
  - Mayor: Hildur Björnsdóttir (Independence Party)
  - City Council President: Björg Magnúsdóttir
  - City Executive Council Chairman: Einar Þorsteinsson

Area
  - Capital city: 244 km^{2} (94 sq mi)
  - Metro: 1,046 km^{2} (404 sq mi)

Population (2026)
  - Capital city: 138,753
  - Density: 569/km^{2} (1,470/sq mi)
  - Metro: 251,912
  - Municipality: 139,804
- Demonym(s): Reykvíkingur, Reykvíkingar (Icelandic)
- Time zone: UTC+00:00 (WET)
- Postal code(s): 101–155
- Municipal number: 0000
- Council: Reykjavík City Council
- Website: reykjavik.is

Reykjavík (Note: English: /ˈreɪkjəvɪk, -viːk/ RAYK-yə-vik, -veek; Icelandic: [ˈreiːcaˌviːk].) is the capital and largest city of Iceland. It is located on the southern shore of the Faxaflói bay in southwest Iceland and has a latitude of 64°08′ N, making it the world's northernmost capital of a sovereign state. (Note: Greenland's capital Nuuk is farther north, but Greenland is not a sovereign state.) Reykjavík has a population of around 140,000 as of 2026, and the surrounding Capital Region has a population of around 252,000, constituting approximately 64% of Iceland's population.

According to Landnámabók, the settlement of Iceland began in Reykjavík when Ingólfur Arnarson arrived from Norway in the year 874. For over 900 years following this, there was no urban development; the city was officially founded in 1786 as a trading town and grew steadily as it transformed into its current state as the centre of Iceland's cultural, economic, and governmental activity. It is popular with tourists and is consistently ranked as one of the cleanest, safest, and most environmentally friendly cities in the world.

== History ==
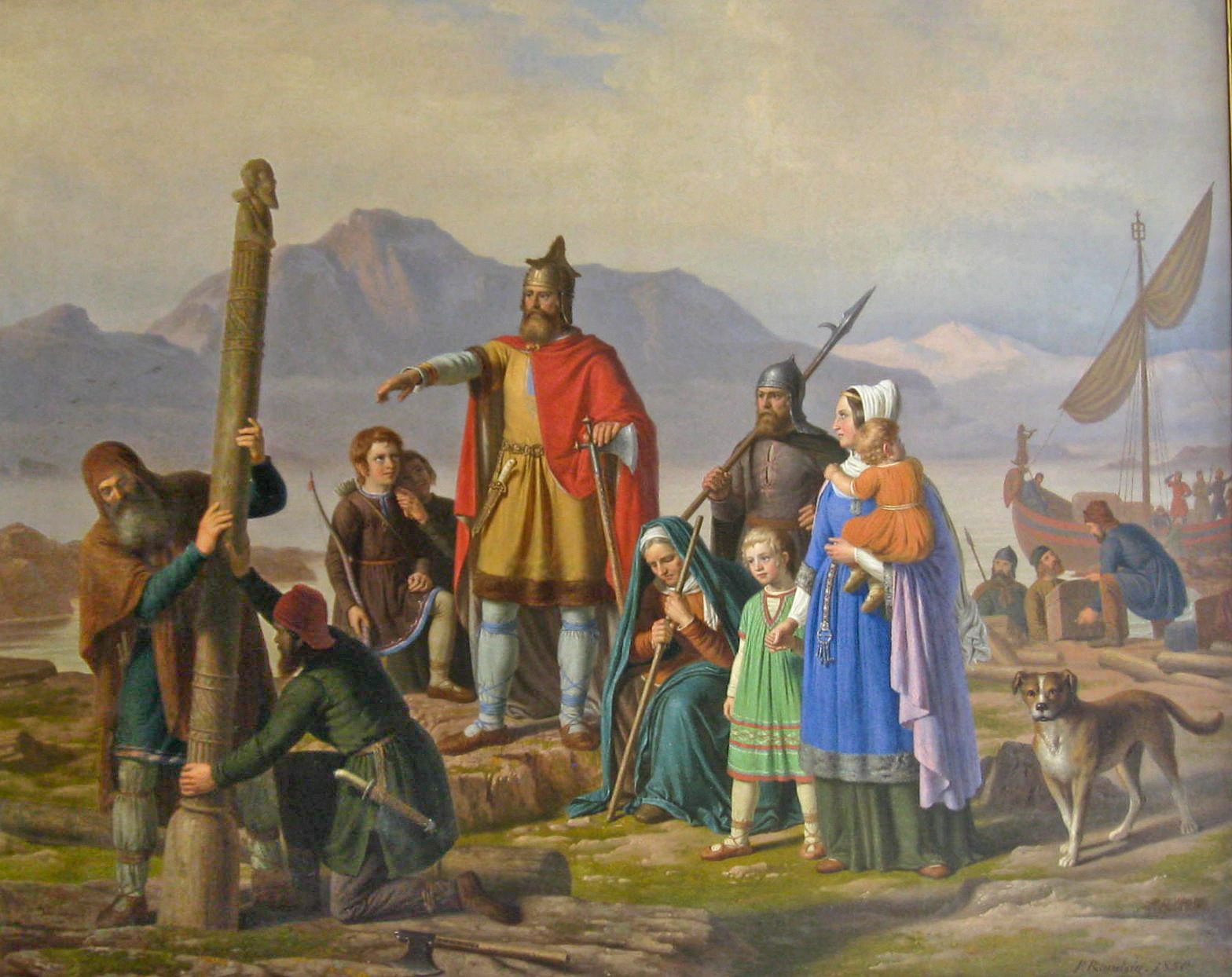
A painting by Johan Peter Raadsig of Ingólfr commanding his high seat pillars to be erected

According to legend, the first permanent Norse settlement in Iceland was established at Reykjavík by Ingólfr Arnarson circa AD 870, as described in the Book of Settlement. Ingólfr is said to have decided the location of his settlement using a traditional Norse method: when land was in sight, he cast his high seat pillars overboard and promised to settle where the gods decided to bring them ashore. Two of his slaves then searched the coasts for three years before finding the pillars in the bay which eventually became the site of Reykjavík.

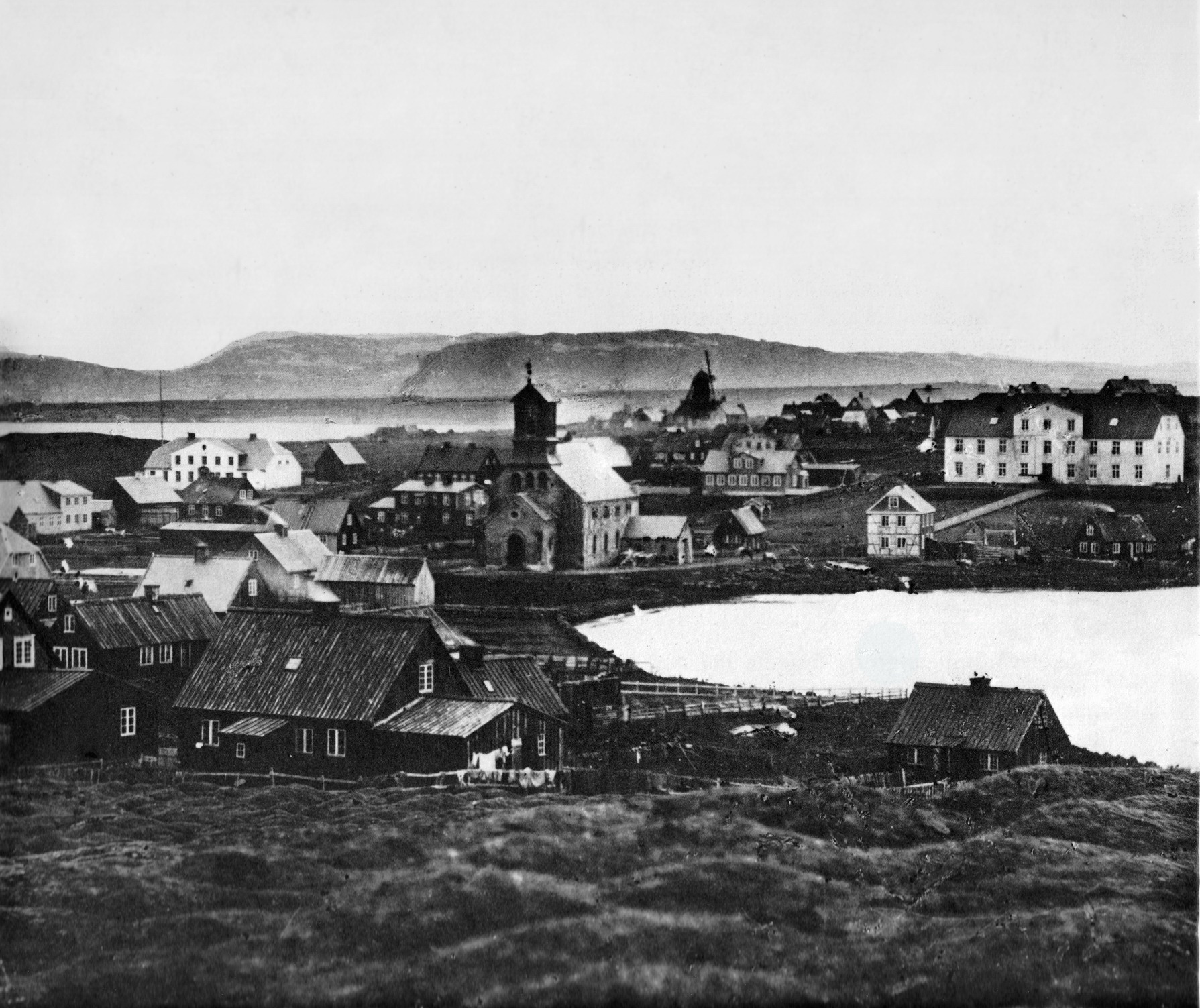
Reykjavík in the 1860s

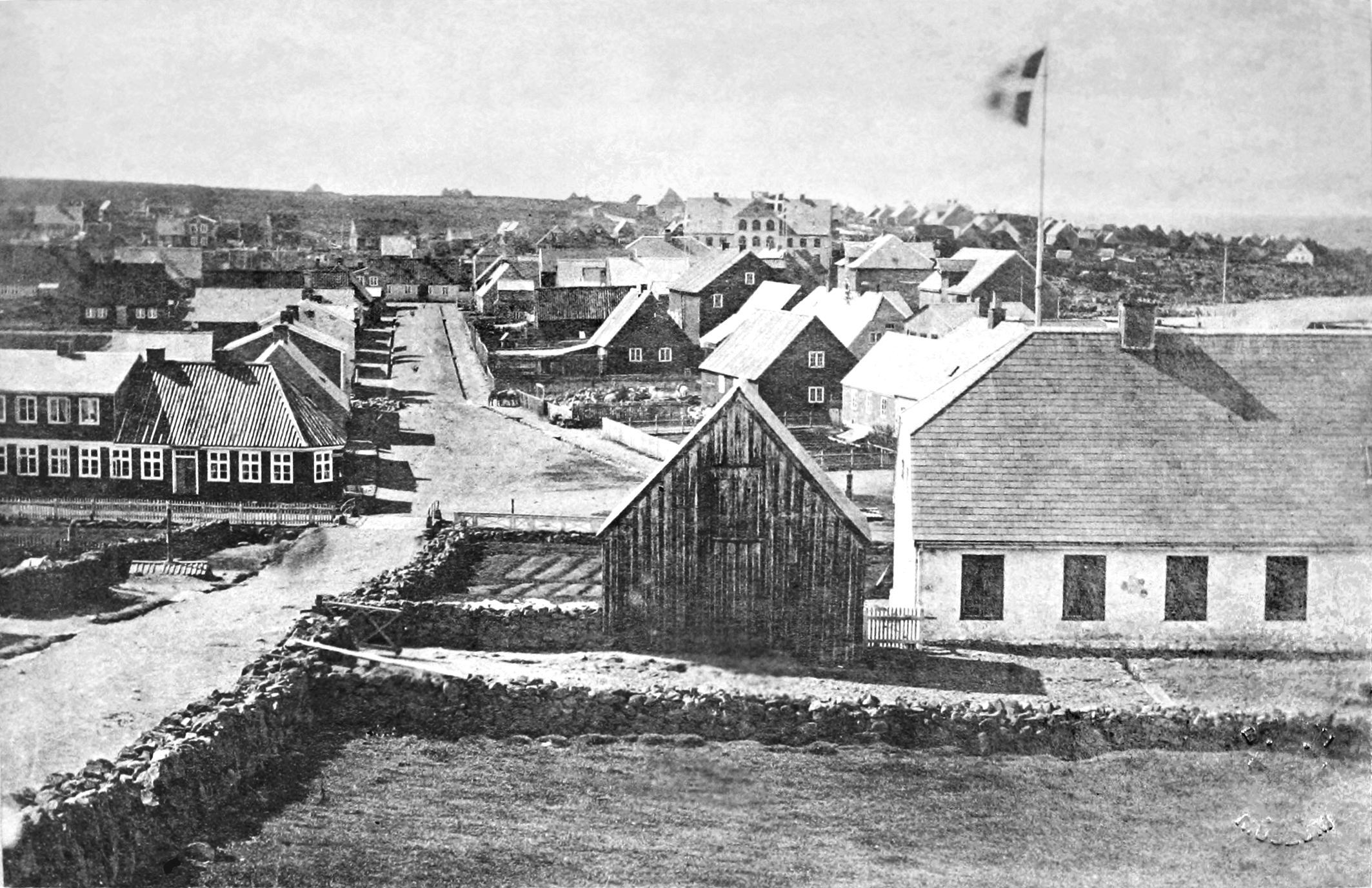
Reykjavík in 1881

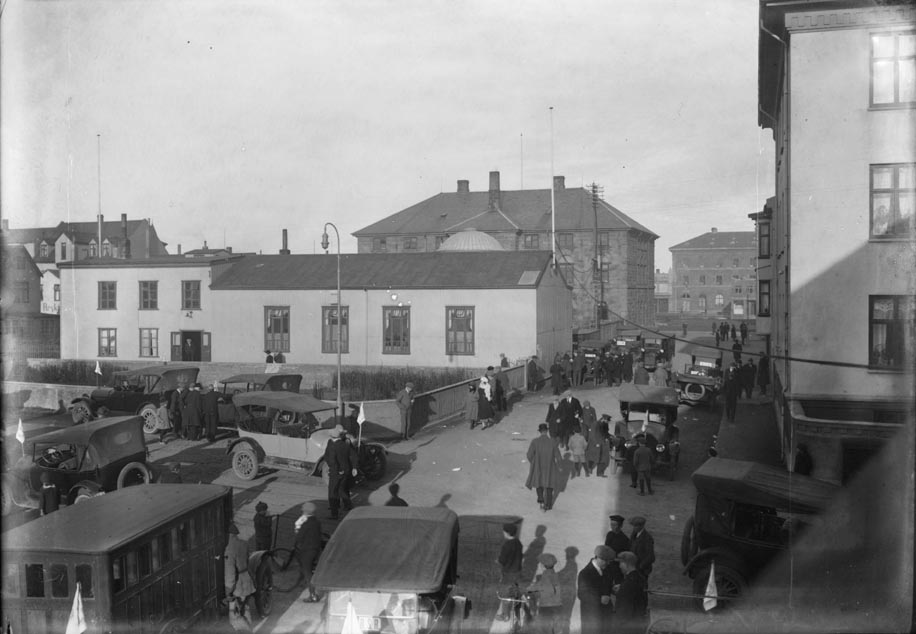
Reykjavík in the 1920s

=== Etymology ===
The name is of Old Norse origin, derived from the roots reykr ('smoke') and vík ('bay'). The name is said to be inspired by steam rising from hot springs in the region. The original name was Reykjar-vík, with an "r" suffix for the genitive singular of reykr; the modern version reykja- uses the genitive plural. The name's meaning is still transparent in modern Icelandic, and in modern Norwegian (røyk + vik). The name originally referred to both the bay on the northern shore of the modern city centre, between Örfirisey and Laugarnes, as well as the estate and farm of Ingólfr Arnarson. This form of the name fell out of use shortly after settlement, and the estate was referred to as Vík á Seltjarnarnesi until the name Reykjavík was revived when urban development began centuries later. The name has been translated as Bay of Smoke in English-language travel guides.

=== Urban development ===
The site of the modern city centre was farmland until the 18th century. In 1752, King Frederik V of Denmark donated the estate of Reykjavík to the Innréttingar corporation. The leader of this movement was Skúli Magnússon. In the 1750s, several houses were built to house the wool industry, which was Reykjavík's most important employer for a few decades and the original reason for its existence. Other industries were undertaken by the Innréttingar, such as fisheries, sulphur mining, agriculture, and shipbuilding.

The Danish Crown abolished monopoly trading in 1786 and granted six communities around the country an exclusive trading charter. Reykjavík was one of them and the only one to hold on to the charter permanently. 1786 is thus regarded as the date of the city's founding. Trading rights were limited to subjects of the Danish Crown, and Danish traders continued to dominate trade in Iceland. Over the following decades, their business in Iceland expanded. Trade restrictions were lifted entirely in 1855, when Iceland was opened to trade with countries outside the Kingdom of Denmark, although Danish merchants continued to dominate the country's foreign trade for decades thereafter.

=== Rise of nationalism ===
Icelandic nationalist sentiment gained influence in the 19th century, and the idea of Icelandic independence became widespread. Reykjavík, as Iceland's only city, was central to such ideas. Advocates of an independent Iceland realized that a strong Reykjavík was fundamental to that objective. All the important events in the history of the independence struggle were important to Reykjavík as well. In 1845 the Alþingi, the general assembly formed in 930 AD, was re-established in Reykjavík; it had been suspended a few decades earlier when it was located at Þingvellir. At the time it functioned only as an advisory assembly, advising the king about Icelandic affairs. The location of Alþingi in Reykjavík effectively established the city as the capital of Iceland.

In 1874, Iceland was given a constitution; with it, Alþingi gained some limited legislative powers and in essence became the institution that it is today. The next step was to move most of the executive power to Iceland: Home Rule was granted in 1904 when the office of Minister for Iceland was established in Reykjavík. On 1 December 1918, Iceland became a sovereign country, the Kingdom of Iceland, in personal union with the Crown of Denmark.

By the 1920s and 1930s, Reykjavík was Iceland's principal trawler port; cod production was its main industry, but the Great Depression hit Reykjavík hard with unemployment, and labour union struggles sometimes became violent.

=== World War II ===
On the morning of 10 May 1940, following the German occupation of Denmark and Norway on 9 April 1940, four British warships approached Reykjavík and anchored in the harbour. In a few hours, the Allied occupation of Reykjavík was complete. There was no armed resistance, and taxi and truck drivers even assisted the invasion force, which initially had no motor vehicles. The Icelandic government had received many requests from the British government to consent to the occupation, but it always declined on the basis of its policy of neutrality. For the remaining years of World War II, British and later American soldiers occupied camps in Reykjavík, and the number of foreign soldiers in Reykjavík became about the same as the local population of the city. The Royal Regiment of Canada formed part of the garrison in Iceland during the early part of the war.

The economic effects of the occupation were positive for Reykjavík: the unemployment of the Depression years vanished, and construction work began. The British built Reykjavík Airport, which remains in service today, mostly for short-haul flights (to domestic destinations and Greenland). The Americans, meanwhile, built Keflavík Airport, situated 50 km (31 mi) WSW of Reykjavík, which became Iceland's primary international airport. In 1944, the Republic of Iceland was founded and a president, elected by the people, replaced the king; the office of the president was placed in Reykjavík.

=== Post-war development ===
In the post-war years, the growth of Reykjavík accelerated. An exodus from the rural countryside began, largely because improved technology in agriculture reduced the need for manpower, and because of a population boom resulting from better living conditions in the country. A once-primitive village was rapidly transformed into a modern city.

In 1972, Reykjavík hosted the famous World Chess Championship between Bobby Fischer and Boris Spassky. The 1986 Reykjavík Summit between Ronald Reagan and Mikhail Gorbachev underlined Reykjavík's international status. Deregulation in the financial sector and the computer revolution of the 1990s again transformed Reykjavík. The financial sector is now a significant employer in the city.

== Geography ==
Aerial view of Reykjavík and its coastline

Reykjavík is located in the southwest of Iceland. The Reykjavík area coastline is characterized by peninsulas, coves, straits, and islands.

During the Ice Age (up to 10,000 years ago) a large glacier covered parts of the city area, reaching as far out as Álftanes. Other parts of the city area were covered by sea water. In the warm periods and at the end of the Ice Age, some hills like Öskjuhlíð were islands. The former sea level is indicated by sediments (with clams) reaching (at Öskjuhlíð, for example) as far as 43 m (141 ft) above the current sea level. The hills of Öskjuhlíð and Skólavörðuholt appear to be the remains of former shield volcanoes which were active during the warm periods of the Ice Age. After the Ice Age, the land rose as the heavy load of the glaciers fell away, and began to look as it does today.

The capital city area continued to be shaped by earthquakes and volcanic eruptions, such as the one 4,500 years ago in the mountain range Bláfjöll, when the lava coming down the Elliðaá valley reached the sea at the bay of Elliðavogur.

The largest river to run through Reykjavík is the Elliðaá River, which is non-navigable. It offers salmon fishing within the city limits. Mount Esja, at 914 m (2,999 ft), is the highest mountain in the vicinity of Reykjavík.

The city of Reykjavík is mostly located on the Seltjarnarnes peninsula, but the suburbs reach far out to the south and east. Reykjavík is a spread-out city: most of its urban area consists of low-density suburbs, and houses are usually widely spaced. The outer residential neighbourhoods are also widely spaced from each other; in between them are the main traffic arteries and a lot of empty space. The city's latitude is 64°08' N, making it the world's northernmost capital of a sovereign state (Nuuk, the capital of Greenland, is slightly further north at 64°10' (about 4 km) but Greenland is a constituent country, not an independent state).

=== Climate ===
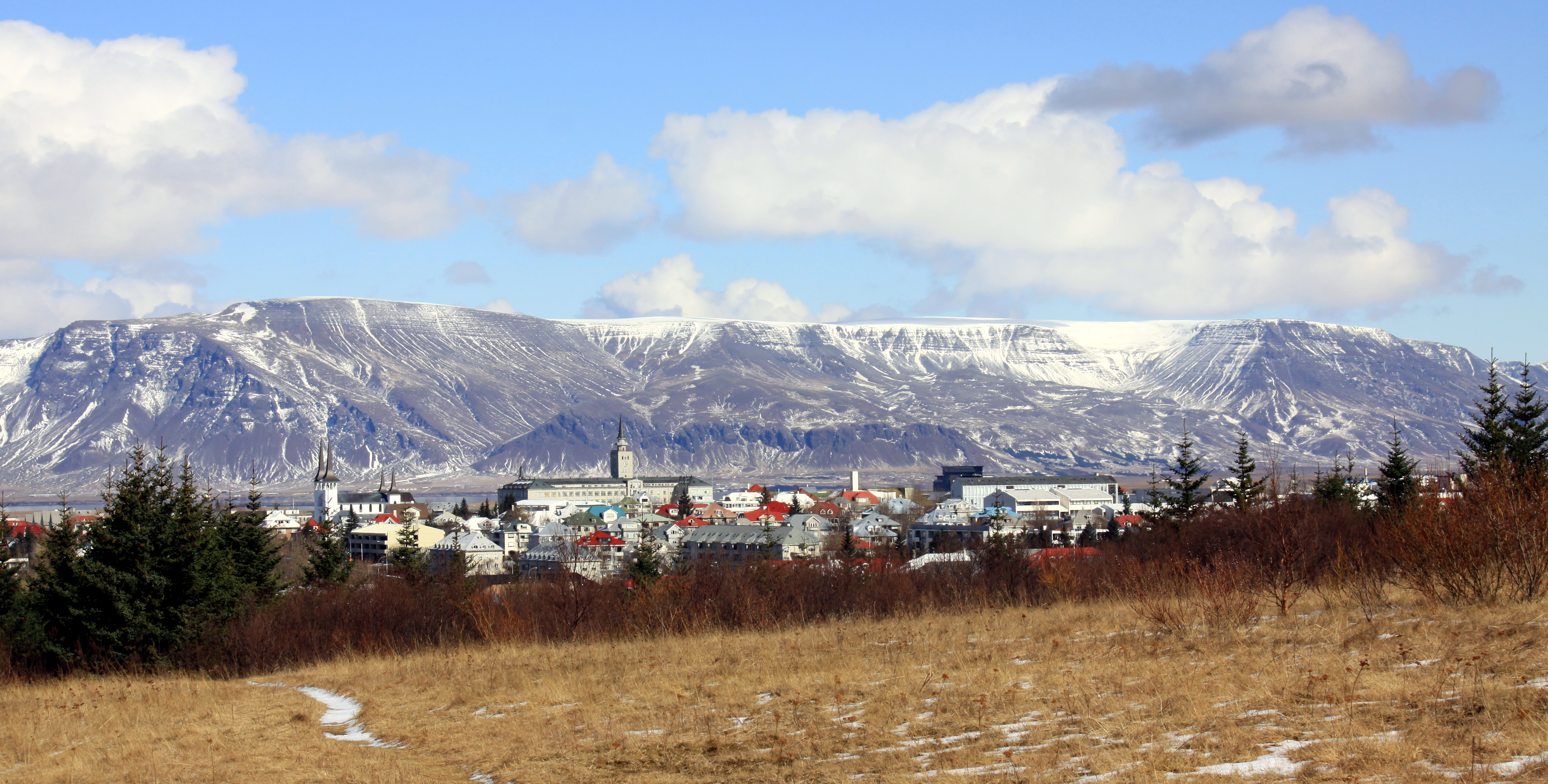
Esja, the mountain range to the north of Reykjavík

Reykjavík has a subpolar oceanic climate (Köppen: Cfc, Trewartha: Eolk). At 64° north, Reykjavík is characterized by extremes of day and night length over the course of the year. From 20 May to 24 July, daylight is essentially permanent as the sun never gets more than 5° below the horizon. Day length drops to less than five hours between 2 December and 10 January. The sun climbs just 3° above the horizon during this time. However, day length begins increasing rapidly during January and by month's end there are seven hours of daylight.

Despite its northern latitude, temperatures very rarely drop below −15 °C (5 °F) in the winter. The proximity to the Arctic Circle and the strong moderation of the Atlantic Ocean in the Icelandic coast (influence of North Atlantic Current, an extension of the Gulf Stream) shape a relatively mild winter and a cold to cool summer. The city's coastal location does make it prone to wind, however, and gales are common in winter (influence of the Icelandic Low). Summers are cold, with temperatures fluctuating between 10 and 15 °C (50 and 59 °F), rarely exceeding 20 °C (68 °F). This is a result of exposure to the maritime winds in its exposed west coast location that causes it to be much cooler in summer than similar latitudes in mainland Scandinavia. Contrasting this, winter days are milder than anywhere in far southern Sweden and the vast majority of Denmark. In fact, winter temperatures are comparable to those of New York City, which is more than 20 degrees farther south. Reykjavík averages 147 days of rain (more than 1mm) per year. Droughts are uncommon, although they occur in some summers. In the summer of 2007, no rain was measured for one month. July and August are the warmest months of the year on average and January and February the coldest.

Summer tends to be the sunniest season, although May averages the most sunshine of any individual month. Overall, the city receives around 1,300 annual hours of sunshine, which is comparable with other places in northern and north-western Europe such as Ireland and Scotland, but substantially less than equally northern regions with a more continental climate, including the Bothnian Bay basin in Scandinavia. Nonetheless, Reykjavík is one of the cloudiest and coldest capitals of any nation in the world. The highest temperature recorded in Reykjavík was 25.7 °C (78 °F), reported on 30 July 2008, while the lowest-ever recorded temperature was −24.5 °C (−12 °F), recorded on 21 January 1918. The coldest month on record is January 1918, with an average temperature of −7.2 °C (19 °F). The warmest is July 2019, with an average temperature of 13.4 °C (56 °F).

Climate data for Reykjavík, 1991–2020 normals, extremes 1829–present
Month	Jan	Feb	Mar	Apr	May	Jun	Jul	Aug	Sep	Oct	Nov	Dec	Year
Record high °C (°F)	10.7 (51.3)	10.2 (50.4)	14.2 (57.6)	17.1 (62.8)	20.6 (69.1)	22.4 (72.3)	25.7 (78.3)	24.8 (76.6)	20.1 (68.2)	15.7 (60.3)	12.9 (55.2)	12.0 (53.6)	25.7 (78.3)
Mean daily maximum °C (°F)	3.2 (37.8)	3.3 (37.9)	4.2 (39.6)	6.9 (44.4)	10.1 (50.2)	13.0 (55.4)	14.9 (58.8)	14.1 (57.4)	11.4 (52.5)	7.6 (45.7)	4.7 (40.5)	3.3 (37.9)	8.1 (46.6)
Daily mean °C (°F)	0.7 (33.3)	0.5 (32.9)	1.2 (34.2)	3.7 (38.7)	6.7 (44.1)	9.8 (49.6)	11.6 (52.9)	11.0 (51.8)	8.5 (47.3)	4.9 (40.8)	2.2 (36.0)	0.8 (33.4)	5.1 (41.2)
Mean daily minimum °C (°F)	−1.7 (28.9)	−1.9 (28.6)	−1.3 (29.7)	1.0 (33.8)	4.0 (39.2)	7.2 (45.0)	9.1 (48.4)	8.6 (47.5)	6.2 (43.2)	2.7 (36.9)	−0.1 (31.8)	−1.6 (29.1)	2.7 (36.9)
Record low °C (°F)	−24.5 (−12.1)	−17.6 (0.3)	−16.4 (2.5)	−16.4 (2.5)	−7.7 (18.1)	−0.7 (30.7)	1.4 (34.5)	−0.4 (31.3)	−4.4 (24.1)	−10.6 (12.9)	−15.1 (4.8)	−16.8 (1.8)	−24.5 (−12.1)
Average precipitation mm (inches)	87.1 (3.43)	90.6 (3.57)	80.7 (3.18)	59.0 (2.32)	52.6 (2.07)	43.3 (1.70)	49.9 (1.96)	64.5 (2.54)	87.0 (3.43)	79.8 (3.14)	86.5 (3.41)	94.9 (3.74)	875.9 (34.48)
Average snowfall cm (inches)	19.9 (7.8)	17.1 (6.7)	23.2 (9.1)	12.1 (4.8)	1.6 (0.6)	0.0 (0.0)	0.0 (0.0)	0.0 (0.0)	0.0 (0.0)	1.4 (0.6)	8.7 (3.4)	17.8 (7.0)	101.8 (40.1)
Average precipitation days (≥ 1.0 mm)	15.3	15.0	14.2	12.0	10.8	9.3	10.3	11.6	15.0	13.1	13.7	14.6	154.9
Average snowy days (≥ 0 cm)	12.2	12.4	9.6	2.1	0.3	0.0	0.0	0.0	0.0	0.6	5.3	12.6	55.1
Average relative humidity (%)	78.1	77.1	76.2	74.4	74.9	77.9	80.3	81.6	79.0	78.0	77.7	77.7	77.8
Average dew point °C (°F)	−2.9 (26.8)	−3.3 (26.1)	−3.0 (26.6)	−1.0 (30.2)	2.0 (35.6)	5.6 (42.1)	7.9 (46.2)	7.6 (45.7)	5.1 (41.2)	1.2 (34.2)	−1.5 (29.3)	−2.9 (26.8)	1.2 (34.2)
Mean monthly sunshine hours	22.6	61.6	110.3	165.1	209.0	189.5	183.1	164.8	118.3	91.6	39.7	12.6	1,368.2
Percentage possible sunshine	12	25	29	36	35	28	28	31	31	31	21	16	27
Average ultraviolet index	0	0	1	2	3	4	4	3	2	1	0	0	2
Source 1: Icelandic Met Office, NOAA
Source 2: timeanddate.com (sunshine percent and dewpoints), Weather Atlas, (UV) and Meteo Climat

Coastal temperature data for Reykjavík
Month	Jan	Feb	Mar	Apr	May	Jun	Jul	Aug	Sep	Oct	Nov	Dec	Year
Average sea temperature °C (°F)	3.9 (39.02)	3.7 (38.66)	4.1 (39.38)	4.7 (40.46)	6.5 (43.70)	8.8 (47.84)	10.5 (50.90)	11.4 (52.52)	9.9 (49.82)	7.7 (45.86)	6.4 (43.52)	5.5 (41.90)	6.9 (44.47)
Source 1: Seatemperature.net

== City administration ==
Map of Reykjavík and nearby towns

The Reykjavík City Council governs the city of Reykjavík and is directly elected by those aged over 18 domiciled in the city. The council has 23 members who are elected using the open list method for four-year terms.

The council selects members of boards, and each board controls a different field under the city council's authority. The most important board is the City Board that wields the executive rights along with the City Mayor. The City Mayor is the senior public official and also the director of city operations. Other public officials control city institutions under the mayor's authority. Thus, the administration consists of two different parts:

- The political power of City Council cascading down to other boards
- Public officials under the authority of the city mayor who administer and manage implementation of policy.

=== Political control ===
The Independence Party was historically the city's ruling party; it had an overall majority from its establishment in 1929 until 1978, when it narrowly lost. From 1978 until 1982, there was a three-party coalition composed of the People's Alliance, the Social Democratic Party, and the Progressive Party. In 1982, the Independence Party regained an overall majority, which it held for three consecutive terms. The 1994 election was won by Reykjavíkurlistinn (the R-list), an alliance of Icelandic socialist parties, led by Ingibjörg Sólrún Gísladóttir. This alliance won a majority in three consecutive elections, but was dissolved for the 2006 election when five different parties were on the ballot. The Independence Party won seven seats, and together with the one Progressive Party it were able to form a new majority in the council which took over in June 2006.

In October 2007, a new majority was formed on the council, consisting of members of the Progressive Party, the Social Democratic Alliance, the Left-Greens and the F-list (liberals and independents), after controversy regarding REI, a subsidiary of OR, the city's energy company. However, three months later the F-list formed a new majority together with the Independence Party. Ólafur F. Magnússon, the leader of the F-list, was elected mayor on 24 January 2008; further, in March 2009, the Independence Party was due to appoint a new mayor. This changed once again on 14 August 2008 when the fourth coalition of the term was formed by the Independence Party and the Social Democratic Alliance, with Hanna Birna Kristjánsdóttir becoming mayor.

The City Council election in May 2010 saw a new political party, The Best Party, win six of 15 seats, and it formed a coalition with the Social Democratic Alliance; comedian Jón Gnarr became mayor. At the 2014 election, the Social Democratic Alliance had its best showing yet, gaining five seats in the council, while Bright Future (successor to the Best Party) received two seats and the two parties formed a coalition with the Left-Green movement and the Pirate Party, which won one seat each. The Independence Party had its worst election ever, with only four seats.

=== Mayor ===
The mayor is appointed by the city council. Typically, one of the council members is chosen; however, they may also appoint a mayor who is not a member of the council. The post was created in 1907 and advertised in 1908. Two applications were received, from Páll Einarsson, sheriff and town mayor of Hafnarfjörður and from Knud Zimsen, town councillor in Reykjavík. Páll was appointed on 7 May and was mayor for six years. At that time the city mayor received a salary of 4,500 ISK per year and 1,500 ISK for office expenses. The current mayor is Hildur Björnsdóttir.

== Demographics ==
Historical population
Year	Pop.	±% p.a.
1901	6,667	—
1910	11,600	+6.35%
1920	17,679	+4.30%
1930	28,304	+4.82%
1940	38,196	+3.04%
1950	56,251	+3.95%
1960	72,407	+2.56%
1970	81,693	+1.21%
1980	83,766	+0.25%
1990	97,569	+1.54%
2000	109,887	+1.20%
2010	118,326	+0.74%
2020	126,549	+0.67%
2026	139,804	+1.67%
Source: Statistics Iceland

Reykjavík is by far the largest and most populous urban area in Iceland. The municipality of Reykjavík had a population of 139,804 on 1 January 2026, comprising 35.5% of the country's population. The Capital Region, which includes the capital and six municipalities around it, was home to 251,912 people; that is about 64% of the country's population.

On 1 January 2026, of the city's population of 139,804, immigrants of the first and second generation numbered 37,348 (26.7%), increasing from 19,801 (16.1%) in 2018, 12,352 (10.4%) in 2008 and 3,106 (2.9%) in 1998. The most common foreign citizens are Poles, Lithuanians, Ukrainians and Romanians. As of 2024, about 64.8% of the city's foreign residents originate in European Union and EFTA member states, and around 48.9% are from the new member states of the EU, mainly former Eastern Bloc countries, which joined in 2004, 2007 and 2013.

Children of foreign origin form a more considerable minority in the city's schools: as many as a third in places. The city is also visited by thousands of tourists, students, and other temporary residents, at times outnumbering natives in the city centre.

Residents by citizenship (1 January 1998 – 2018)
Citizenship^{[a]}	2018			2008			1998		
Citizenship^{[a]}	Number	% of total population	% of foreign citizens	Number	% of total population	% of foreign citizens	Number	% of total population	% of foreign citizens
Iceland	110,445	87.63%		109,111	91.82%		104,920	97.74%	
Poland	5,526	4.38%	35.43%	3,146	2.65%	32.38%	95	0.09%	3.92%
Lithuania	1,733	1.37%	11.11%	811	0.68%	8.35%	8	0.01%	0.33%
Latvia	595	0.47%	3.82%	217	0.18%	2.23%	1	0.00%	0.04%
United Kingdom	487	0.39%	3.12%	222	0.19%	2.28%	153	0.14%	6.32%
Spain	482	0.38%	3.09%	87	0.07%	0.90%	41	0.04%	1.69%
Germany	481	0.38%	3.08%	450	0.38%	4.63%	148	0.14%	6.11%
United States	420	0.33%	2.69%	331	0.28%	3.41%	313	0.29%	12.93%
Romania	419	0.33%	2.69%	50	0.04%	0.51%	4	0.00%	0.17%
Philippines	409	0.32%	2.62%	453	0.38%	4.66%	110	0.10%	4.54%
Portugal	393	0.31%	2.52%	278	0.23%	2.86%	31	0.03%	1.28%
France	371	0.29%	2.38%	145	0.12%	1.49%	71	0.07%	2.93%
Denmark^{[b]}	354	0.28%	2.27%	419	0.35%	4.31%	358	0.33%	14.79%
Vietnam	243	0.19%	1.56%	207	0.17%	2.13%	43	0.04%	1.78%
Italy	242	0.19%	1.55%	80	0.07%	0.82%	17	0.02%	0.70%
Thailand	216	0.17%	1.38%	286	0.24%	2.94%	155	0.14%	6.40%
Czech Republic	176	0.14%	1.13%	72	0.06%	0.74%	8	0.01%	0.33%
Hungary	172	0.14%	1.10%	48	0.04%	0.49%	3	0.00%	0.12%
China	164	0.13%	1.05%	144	0.12%	1.48%	40	0.04%	1.65%
Sweden	156	0.12%	1.00%	201	0.17%	2.07%	117	0.11%	4.83%
Croatia	153	0.12%	0.98%	18	0.02%	0.19%	8	0.01%	0.33%
Slovakia	127	0.10%	0.81%	91	0.08%	0.94%	3	0.00%	0.12%
Norway	120	0.10%	0.77%	141	0.12%	1.45%	154	0.14%	6.36%
Bulgaria	115	0.09%	0.74%	57	0.05%	0.59%	17	0.02%	0.70%
Russia	110	0.09%	0.71%	109	0.09%	1.12%	32	0.03%	1.32%
Syria	109	0.09%	0.70%	7	0.01%	0.07%	3	0.00%	0.12%
Netherlands	100	0.08%	0.64%	75	0.06%	0.77%	28	0.03%	1.16%
Ukraine	81	0.06%	0.52%	89	0.07%	0.92%	9	0.01%	0.37%
Canada	80	0.06%	0.51%	63	0.05%	0.65%	35	0.03%	1.45%
India	73	0.06%	0.47%	86	0.07%	0.89%	10	0.01%	0.41%
Greece	60	0.05%	0.38%	4	0.00%	0.04%	3	0.00%	0.12%
Ireland	60	0.05%	0.38%	25	0.02%	0.26%	13	0.01%	0.54%
Finland	59	0.05%	0.38%	62	0.05%	0.64%	51	0.05%	2.11%
Iran	56	0.04%	0.36%	16	0.01%	0.16%	5	0.00%	0.21%
Morocco	53	0.04%	0.34%	54	0.05%	0.56%	22	0.02%	0.91%
Afghanistan	50	0.04%	0.32%	1	0.00%	0.01%	0	0.00%	0.00%
Austria	49	0.04%	0.31%	45	0.04%	0.46%	17	0.02%	0.70%
Switzerland	48	0.04%	0.31%	32	0.03%	0.33%	11	0.01%	0.45%
Japan	45	0.04%	0.29%	34	0.03%	0.35%	14	0.01%	0.58%
Serbia^{[c]}	43	0.03%	0.28%	69	0.06%	0.71%			
Iraq	42	0.03%	0.27%	2	0.00%	0.02%	4	0.00%	0.17%
Mexico	40	0.03%	0.26%	15	0.01%	0.15%	12	0.01%	0.50%
Nigeria	40	0.03%	0.26%	25	0.02%	0.26%	3	0.00%	0.12%
Albania	39	0.03%	0.25%	15	0.01%	0.15%	1	0.00%	0.04%
Belgium	38	0.03%	0.24%	26	0.02%	0.27%	8	0.01%	0.33%
Australia	37	0.03%	0.24%	28	0.02%	0.29%	9	0.01%	0.37%
Brazil	37	0.03%	0.24%	26	0.02%	0.27%	8	0.01%	0.33%
Estonia	34	0.03%	0.22%	40	0.03%	0.41%	5	0.00%	0.21%
Colombia	32	0.03%	0.21%	72	0.06%	0.74%	10	0.01%	0.41%
Pakistan	30	0.02%	0.19%	6	0.01%	0.06%	4	0.00%	0.17%
Slovenia	25	0.02%	0.16%	6	0.01%	0.06%	3	0.00%	0.12%
Kosovo^{[d]}	24	0.02%	0.15%						
Kenya	23	0.02%	0.15%	23	0.02%	0.24%	2	0.00%	0.08%
Ethiopia	22	0.02%	0.14%	35	0.03%	0.36%	1	0.00%	0.04%
Nepal	20	0.02%	0.13%	40	0.03%	0.41%	2	0.00%	0.08%
(Federal Republic of Yugoslavia) Yugoslavia^{[e]}							65	0.06%	2.68%
Other Asia	143	0.11%	0.92%	165	0.14%	1.70%	33	0.03%	1.36%
Other Africa	129	0.10%	0.73%	88	0.07%	0.91%	40	0.04%	1.65%
Other Americas	104	0.08%	0.67%	111	0.09%	1.14%	39	0.04%	1.61%
Other Europe^{[f]}	41	0.03%	0.26%	223	0.19%	2.29%	81	0.08%	3.35%
Stateless	38	0.03%	0.27%	58	0.05%	0.60%	2	0.00%	0.08%
Other Oceania	11	0.01%	0.07%	10	0.01%	0.10%	0	0.00%	0.00%
Other EU and EFTA	8	0.01%	0.08%	5	0.00%	0.05%	0	0.00%	0.00%
Total: EU and EFTA^{[g]}	12,583	9.98%	80.68%	6,835^{[h]}	5.75%	70.35%	1,258^{[i]}	1.17%	51.96%
Total: Asia	1,580	1.25%	10.13%	1,407	1.18%	14.48%	421	0.39%	17.39%
Total: Nordic countries^{[j]}	689	0.55%	4.42%	823	0.69%	8.47%	680	0.63%	28.09%
Total: Northern America	500	0.40%	3.21%	394	0.33%	4.06%	348	0.32%	14.37%
Total: Europe outside of EU and EFTA	338	0.27%	2.17%	523	0.44%	5.38%	278	0.26%	11.48%
Total: Africa	296	0.23%	1.90%	237	0.20%	2.44%	73	0.07%	3.02%
Total: Latin America and the Caribbean	213	0.17%	1.37%	224	0.19%	2.31%	69	0.06%	2.85%
Total: Oceania	48	0.04%	0.33%	38	0.03%	0.39%	9	0.01%	0.37%
Total foreign citizens	15,596	12.37%	100%	9,716	8.18%	100%	2,421	2.26%	100%
Total population	126,041	100%		118,827	100%		107,341	100%	

^{a} Showing only countries with 20 or more citizens in the 2018 census.
^{b} Including citizens of the Faroe Islands and Greenland.
^{c} Not included in the 1998 census. See Yugoslavia.
^{d} Included as part of Serbia in the 2008 census, and as part of Yugoslavia in the 1998 census.
^{e} Federal Republic of Yugoslavia (1992–2006). Some persons who were registered as Yugoslavians after 1992 may in fact have origins in any of the six original republics of the union.
^{f} Including citizens of unspecified countries of former Yugoslavia and the former Soviet Union.
^{g} Including the Nordic countries except Iceland.
^{h} Not including the 2013 enlargement of the European Union.
^{i} Not including the 2004 and 2007 enlargement of the European Union.
^{j} Excluding Iceland.

Historical population of Reykjavík

=== Districts ===
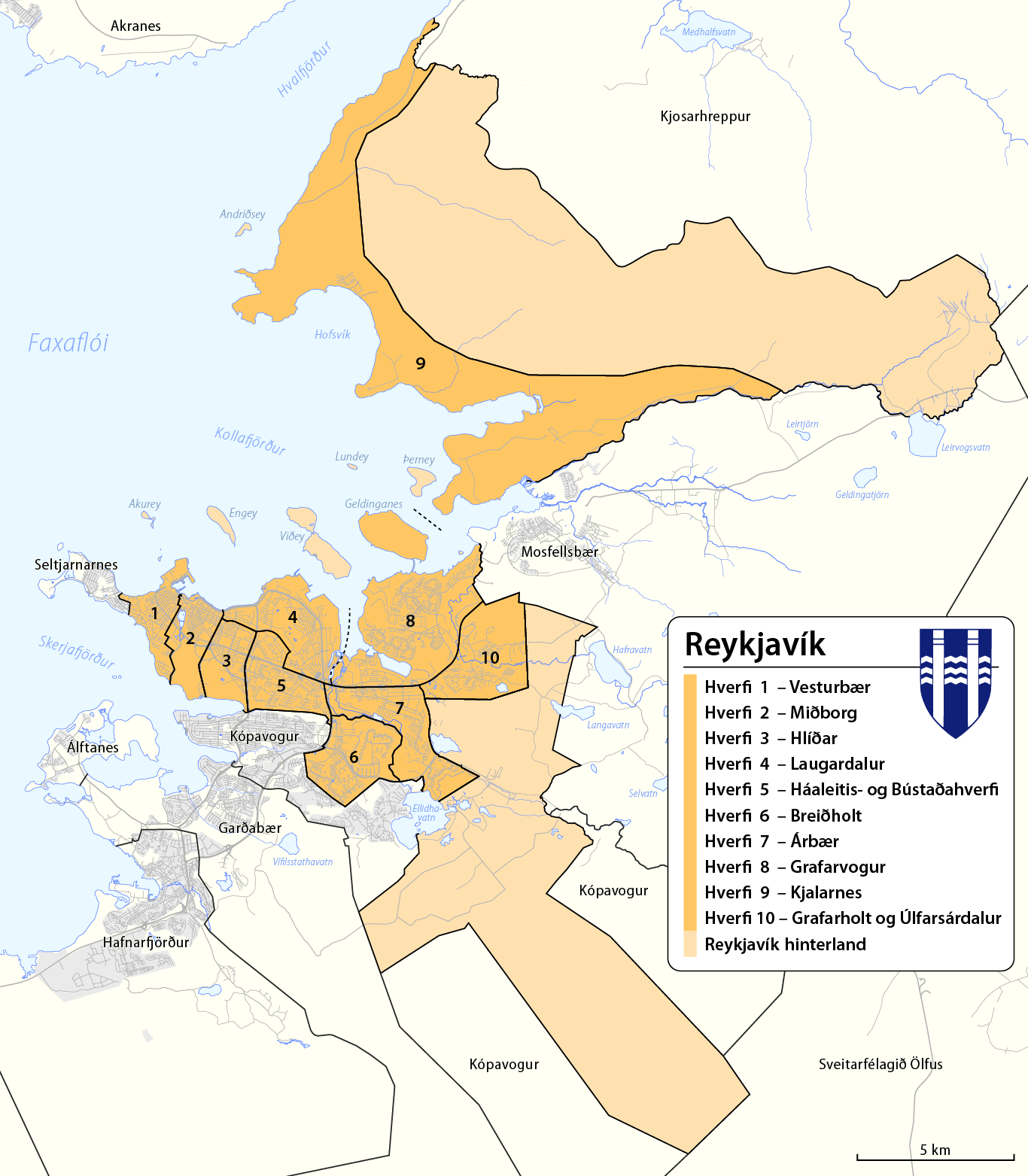
Districts of Reykjavík

Reykjavík is divided into 10 districts:

- Vesturbær (District 1)
- Miðborg (District 2, city centre)
- Hlíðar (District 3)
- Laugardalur (District 4)
- Háaleiti og Bústaðir (District 5)
- Breiðholt (District 6)
- Árbær (District 7)
- Grafarvogur (District 8)
- Kjalarnes (District 9) (in the north)
- Grafarholt og Úlfarsárdalur (District 10)

In addition, there are hinterland areas (lightly shaded on the map) which are not assigned to any district.

== Economy ==
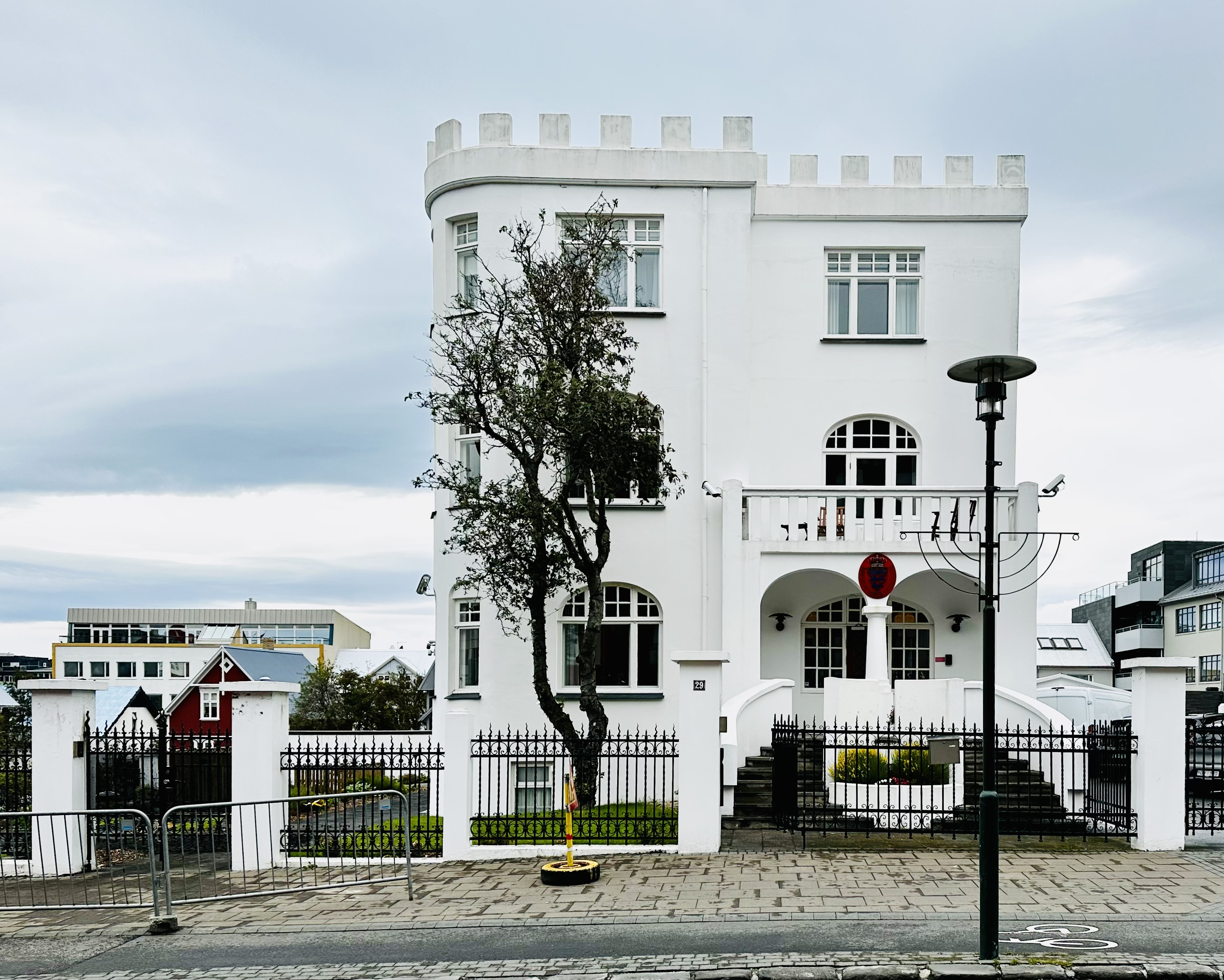
Embassy of Denmark

Borgartún is the financial centre of Reykjavík, hosting a large number of companies. Reykjavík has been at the centre of Iceland's economic growth and subsequent economic contraction over the 2000s, a period referred to in foreign media as the "Nordic Tiger" years, or "Iceland's Boom Years". The economic boom led to a sharp increase in construction, with large redevelopment projects such as Harpa concert hall and conference centre and others. Many of these projects were halted during the 2008 financial crisis.

There are 14 embassies in Reykjavik, in addition to ambassadorial residences, and representative offices for Greenland, the Faroe Islands, and the European Union and for example China.

== Infrastructure ==
=== Roads ===
Automobile ownership in Reykjavík is high—Iceland has one of the highest car ownership rates in the world—with 779 cars per 1000 people (as of 2024), a figure similar to the United States. Throughout the latter half of the 20th century, city policy and investment was based on road transport. As a result, Reykjavík is highly car-dependent and public transport systems in Iceland are relatively underdeveloped. Several multi-lane highways, mainly dual carriageways, run between the most heavily populated areas and are the most frequently driven routes.

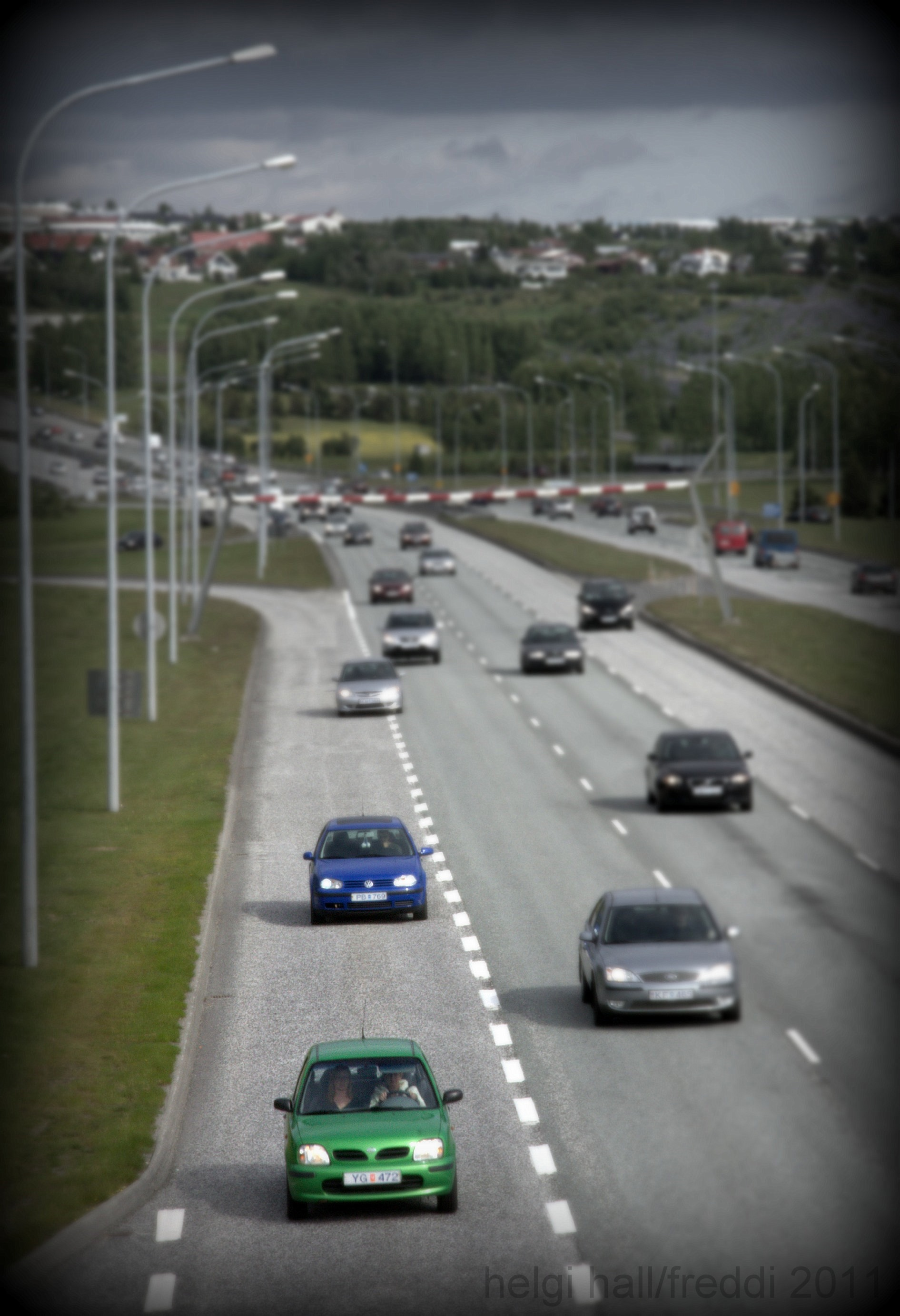
Trunk road in Reykjavík

Since the 2010s, Reykjavík has increasingly been affected by traffic congestion, due to its car-centric nature and peninsular geography . Parking spaces are plentiful in most suburban areas. Route 1 (the Ring Road) runs through the city outskirts and connects the city to the rest of Iceland.

=== Public Transport ===
Public transportation is operated by Strætó bs. by a fleet of city buses serving Reykjavík and its surrounding towns. Strætó also manages rural coach services for most of the country in co-operation with the Icelandic Road Administration.

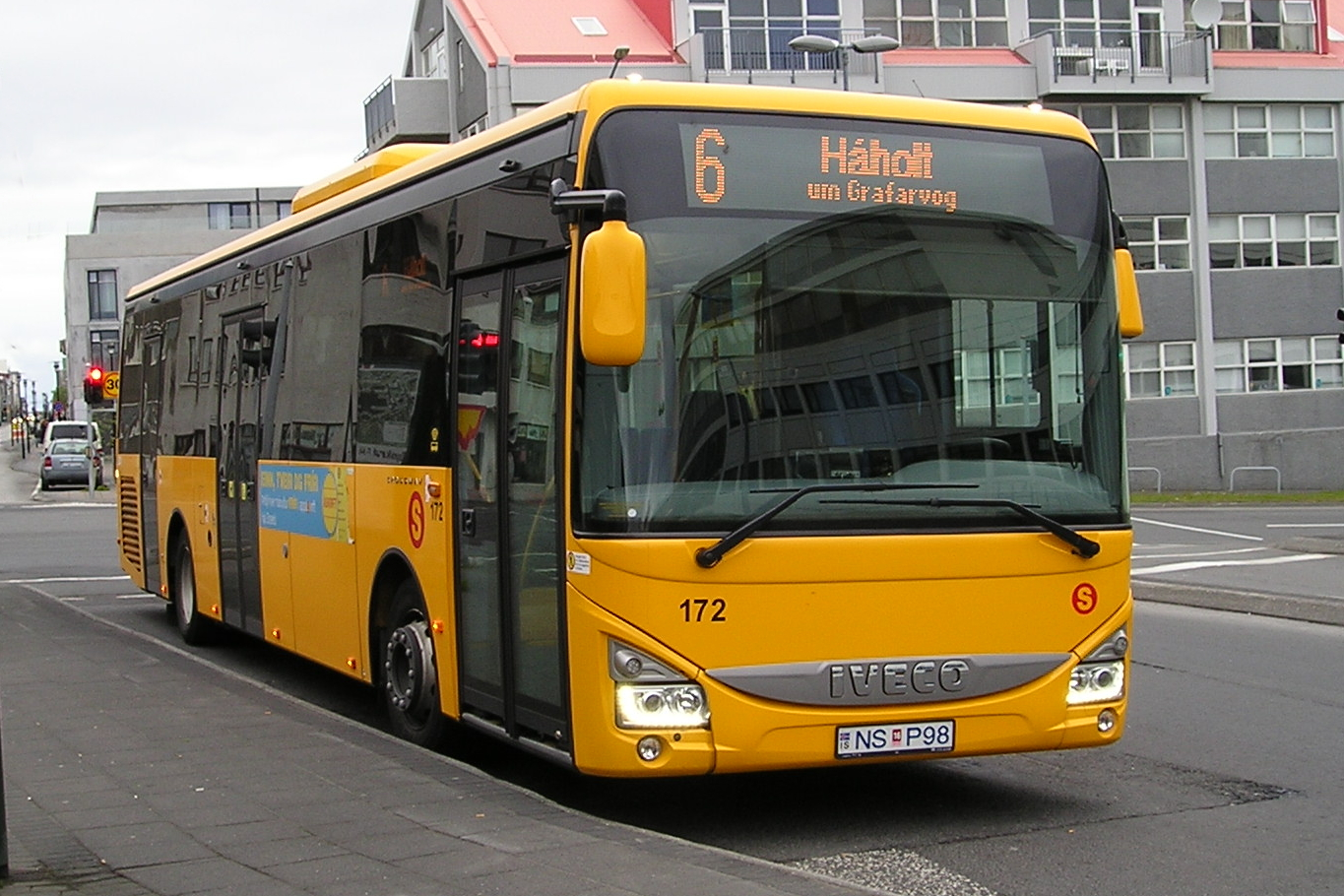
Bus in Reykjavík

A bus rapid transit system is planned for the Greater Reykjavík Area, called Borgarlína. Originally envisioned as a light rail system, the network will be composed of dedicated rights of way for buses and prioritised junctions. As of 2025, the first phase is due to open in 2031.

=== Airports ===
Keflavík International Airport, also known as Reykjavík-Keflavík, is located around 40 km southwest of the city, serves international flights and is the main gateway to the country. Reykjavík Airport is positioned inside the city, just south of the city centre. It is used for domestic flights, general aviation and medical flights. There has been some discussion of the relocation or removal of the airport, but no decision has been made as of 2026.

=== Seaports ===
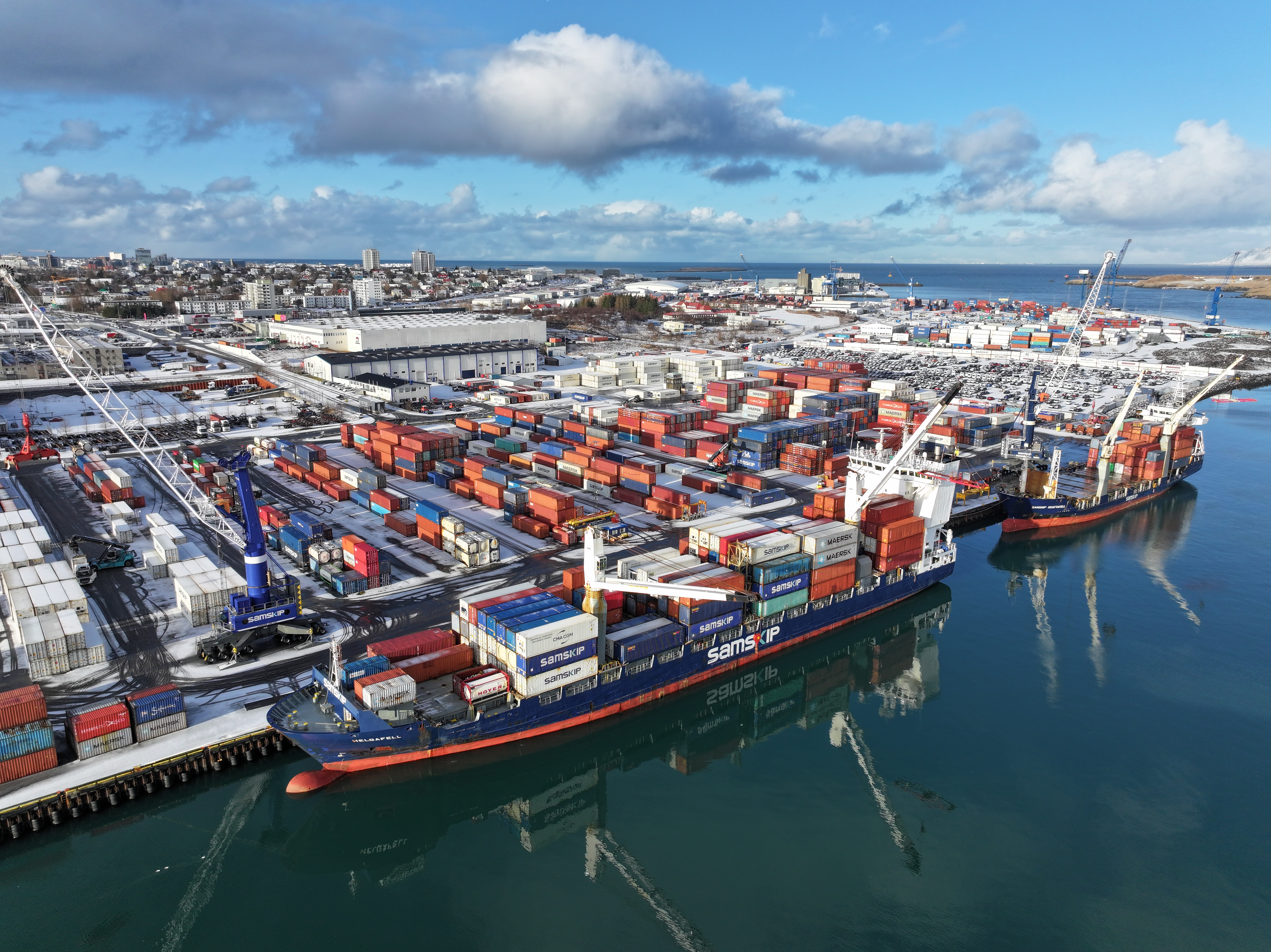
Container terminal at Sundahöfn

Reykjavík has two seaports: the old harbour near the city centre, which is mainly used by trawlers, tourists vessels, visiting ships and smaller cruise ships, while Sundahöfn in the east city, is the largest cargo port in the country and serves larger cruise ships.

=== Railways ===
There are no railways in Iceland. A narrow-gauge locomotive was used to haul quarried stones from mines in Öskjuhlíð, Þingholtum and other locations, which now all sits inside the city limits, to construct the harbour, its quays and its defensive walls in the early 20th century, and is on display by the harbour in the summer time. Proposals have been made for a high-speed rail link between the city and Keflavík.

=== District heating ===
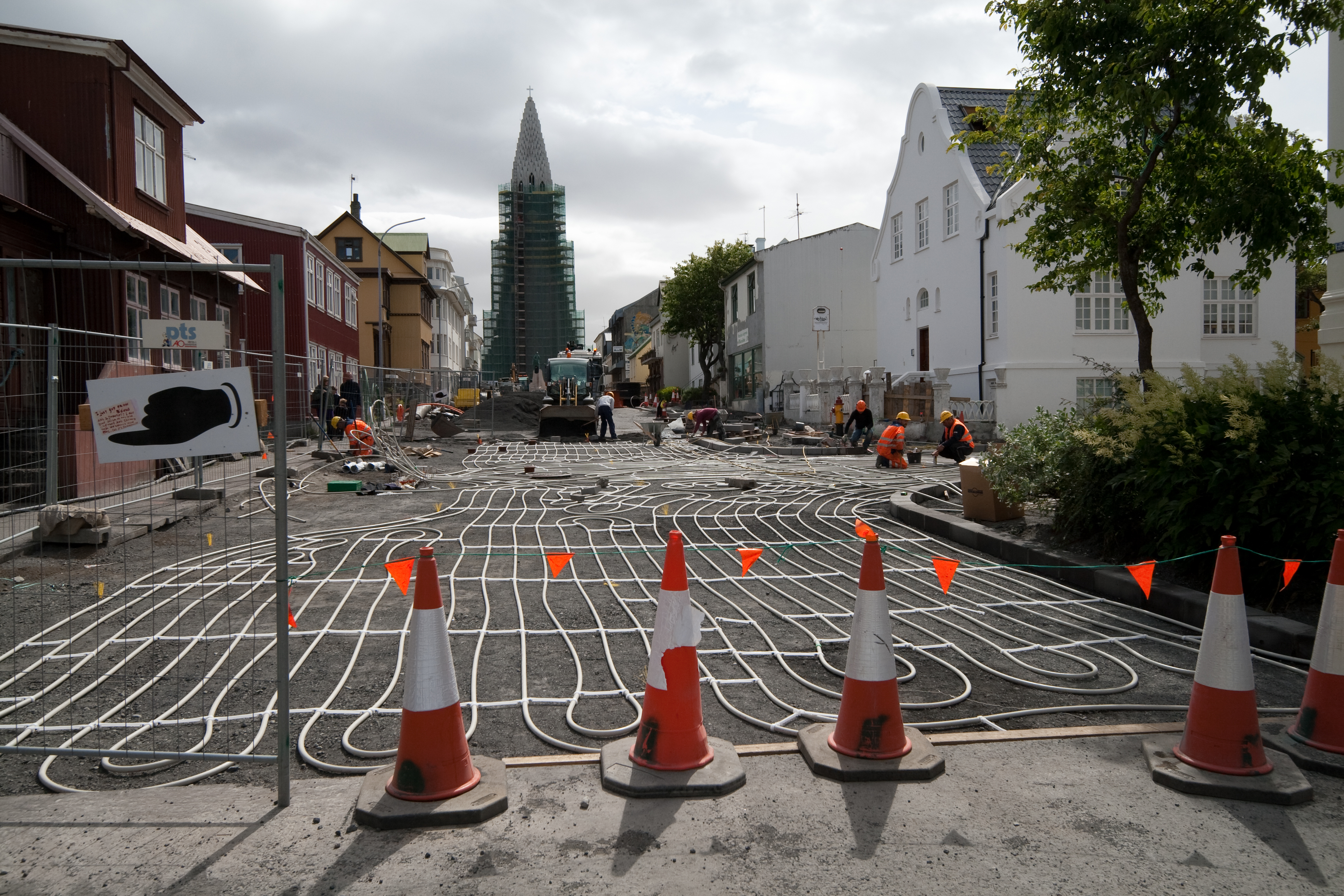
Geothermally powered snow-melting system being installed on Skólavörðustígur, Reykjavík.

Volcanic activity provides all of Reykjavík and surrounding areas with geothermal district heating systems for both residential and industrial districts. Geothermal hot water is used to heat roughly 90% of all buildings in Iceland. All buildings in Reykjavík are heated by geothermal means. Geothermal hot water is also used to heat the city's numerous public pools and hot tubs.

In heavily trafficked areas, mostly in the city centre, pavements and streets use geothermal snow-melting systems. In addition, many driveways of private residences are also fitted with geothermal snow-melting systems. The total thermal capacity of Reykjavíks geothermal hot water production is around 830MW, and the city has an average heating demand of 473 MW. Hot water for Reyjavík's district heating system comes from lower temperature geothermal fields within the city as well as two combined heat and power (CHP) geothermal power plants:

- Nesjavellir CHP plant
- Hellisheiði CHP plant

== Cultural heritage ==
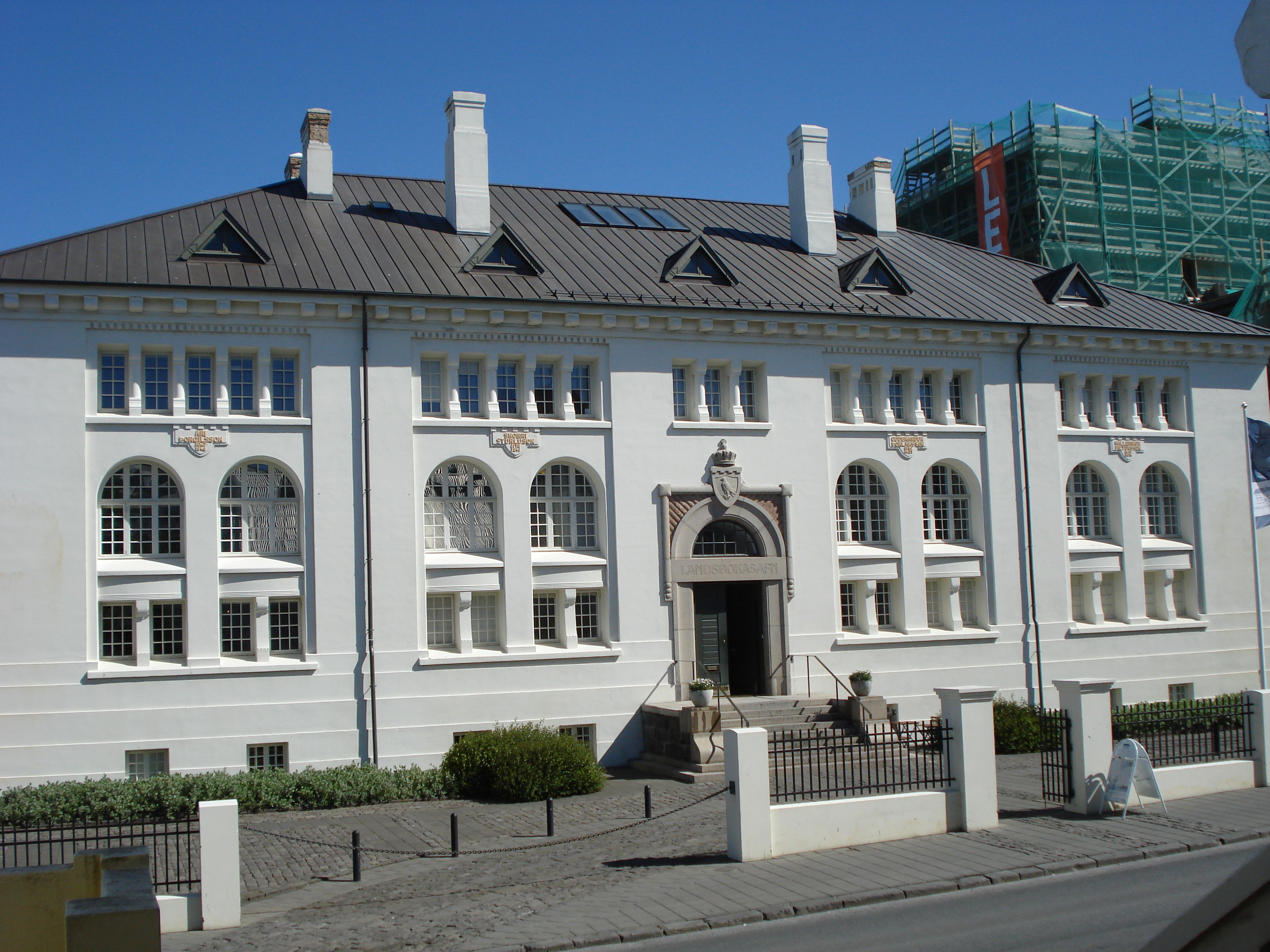
Safnahúsið

Safnahúsið (the Culture House) was opened in 1909 and has a number of important exhibits. Originally built to house the National Library and National Archives and also previously the location of the National Museum and Natural History Museum, it was re-modeled in 2000 to promote the Icelandic national heritage. Many of Iceland's national treasures are on display, such as the Poetic Edda, and the Sagas in their original manuscripts. There are also changing exhibitions of various topics.

== Literary heritage ==
As Reykjavík is Iceland's capital and largest city, it plays a vital role in all cultural life in the country. The city is home to Iceland's main cultural institutions, its arts scene and it has a diverse range of cultural happenings and grassroots activities. Most of the country's writers live in the city, and it also provides the setting for the majority of contemporary Icelandic literature – a development that has gone hand in hand with the expansion of the city in the past 100 years or so.

Reykjavík is home to Icelandic medieval literature, including the Sagas of the Icelanders and the Poetic Edda, landmarks of world literature still widely read and translated today. This literary heritage is the core of the nation's identity and narrative art is the single most important part of its cultural history. The Árni Magnússon Institute for Icelandic Studies in Reykjavík is the centre of this heritage. It preserves manuscripts, conducts research on them and publishes texts for the public, in addition to offering research facilities and tutoring to foreign scholars and students. The Arnamagnæan Manuscript Collection was added to the UNESCO Memory of the World Register in July 2009. Reykjavík city was designated as a UNESCO City of Literature in 2011 and joined then the UNESCO Creatives Cities network.

Iceland is one of the smallest linguistic areas in the world, with only around 330,000 inhabitants and very few speakers outside the country. The language has not changed much since the time of settlement in the 9th century and modern Icelanders can still read the original medieval texts with relative ease. Literature plays a vital role in cherishing and cultivating the language, both original Icelandic literature and translations. Language undergoes constant renewal and development in fiction, and translation of foreign work has also been instrumental in conserving this thousand-year-old literary language.

Several Reykjavík writers have received international and Nordic awards. Halldór Laxness was awarded the Nobel Prize for Literature in 1955 for "vivid epic power which has renewed the great narrative art of Iceland". The House of Halldór Laxness, Gljúfrasteinn, in the capital area can be visited year-round. A number of writers have won the Nordic Council's Literature Prize, among them are Thor Vilhjálmsson, Einar Már Guðmundsson and Sjón, and authors such as Guðrún Helgadóttir, Kristín Steinsdóttir and Ragnheiður Gestsdóttir are winners of The Nordic Children's Literature Prize. Crime writer Arnaldur Indriðason has won prizes abroad, including The Golden Dagger Award. Among other prizes awarded to writers from Reykjavík are the Kairos Preis (Andri Snaer Magnason), the Swedish Academy's Nordic Literature Prize (Guðbergur Bergsson) and the Prix de Page (Auður Ava Ólafsdóttir). Contemporary Icelandic writers are published in an increased number in translations throughout the world.

== Lifestyle ==
=== Nightlife ===
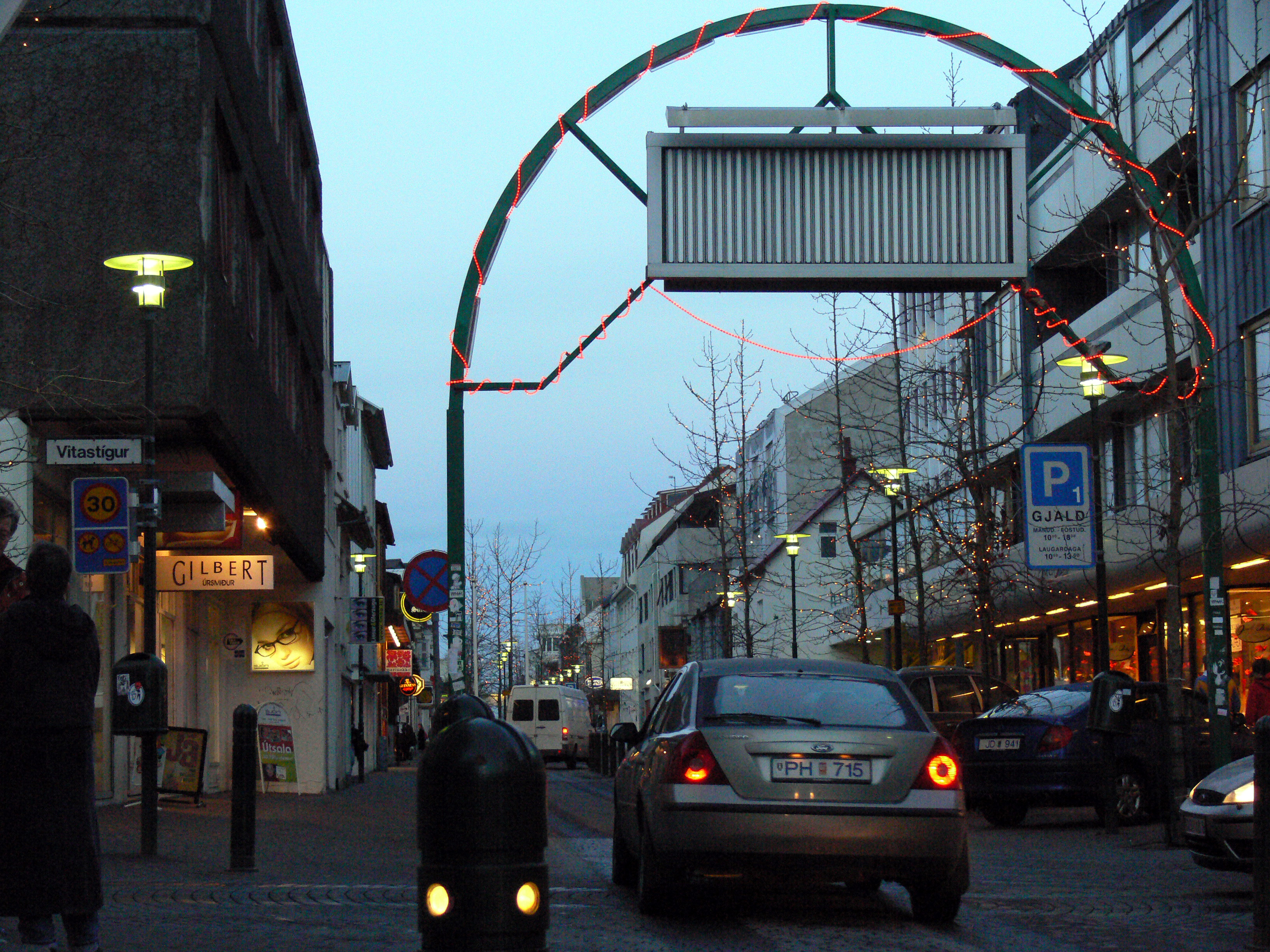
Laugavegur main street in downtown Reykjavík

Alcohol is expensive at bars. People tend to drink at home before going out. Beer was banned in Iceland until 1 March 1989 but has since become popular among many Icelanders as their alcoholic drink of choice.

=== Live music ===
The Iceland Airwaves music festival is staged annually in November. This festival takes place all over the city, and the concert venue Harpa is one of the main locations. Other venues that frequently organise live music events are Kex, Húrra, Gaukurinn, Mengi (centre for contemporary music, avant-garde music and experimental music), the Icelandic Opera and the National Theatre of Iceland for classical music.

=== New Year's Eve ===
The arrival of the new year is a particular cause for celebration to the people of Reykjavík. Icelandic law states that anyone may purchase and use fireworks between 28 December and 6 January. As a result, every New Year's Eve the city is lit up with fireworks displays.

== Main sights ==
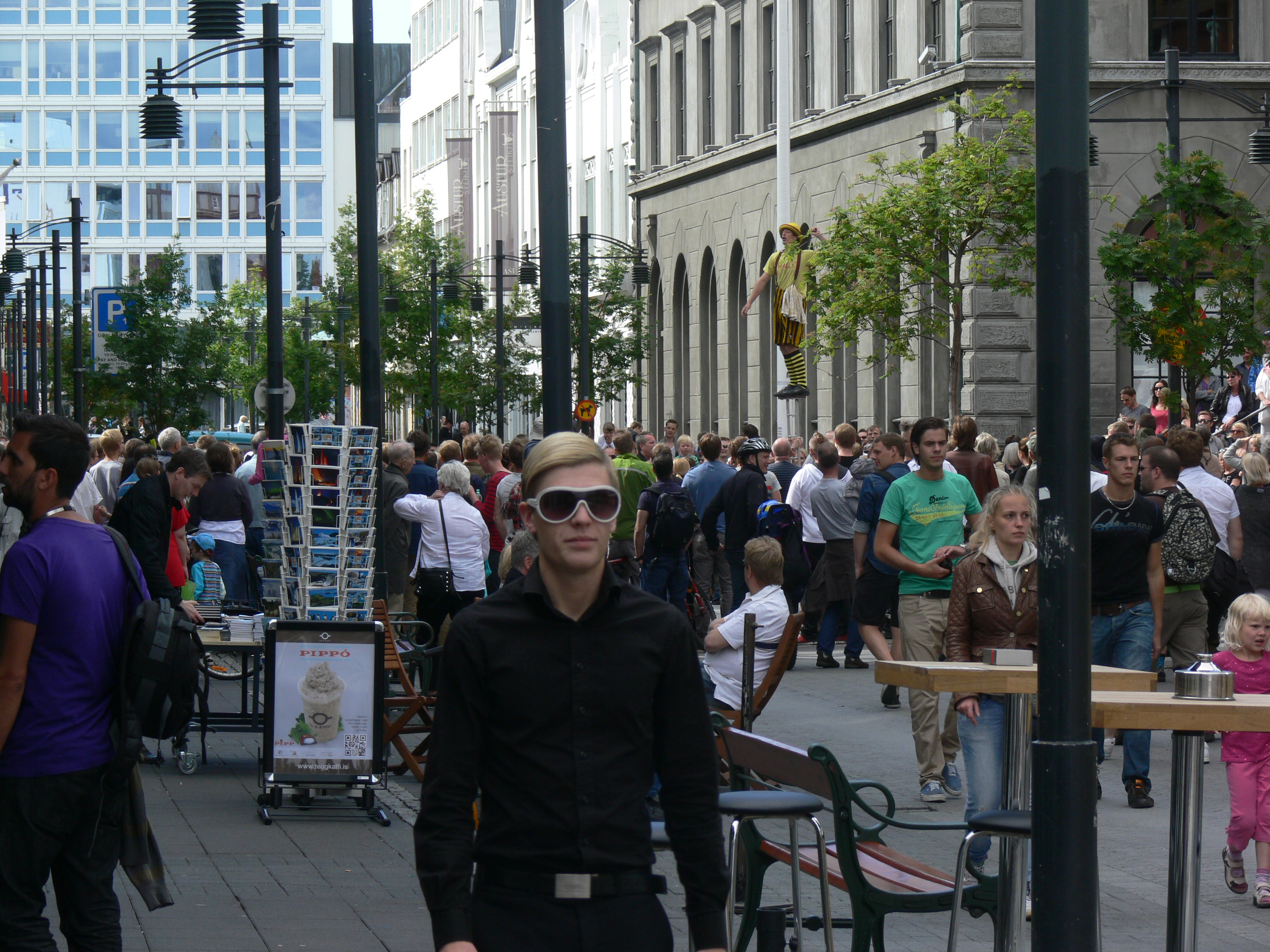
Austurstræti street

- Alþingishúsið – the Icelandic parliament building
- Austurvöllur – a park in central Reykjavík surrounded by restaurants and bars
- Árbæjarsafn (Reykjavík Open Air Museum) – Reykjavík's Municipal Museum
- CIA.IS – Center for Icelandic Art – general information on Icelandic visual art
- Hallgrímskirkja – the largest church in Iceland
- Harpa Reykjavík – Reykjavík Concert & Conference Center
- Heiðmörk – the largest forest and nature reserve in the area
- Höfði – the house in which Gorbachev and Reagan met in 1986 for the Iceland Summit
- Kringlan – the second-largest shopping mall in Iceland
- Laugardalslaug – swimming pool
- Laugavegur – main shopping street
- National and University Library of Iceland (Þjóðarbókhlaðan)
- National Museum of Iceland (Þjóðminjasafnið)
- Nauthólsvík – a geothermally-heated beach
- Perlan – Reykjavík's natural history museum, housed in a glass dome resting on six water tanks
- Reykjavík Town Hall – city hall
- Rauðhólar – a cluster of red pseudo- craters
- Reykjavík 871±2 – exhibition of an archaeological excavation of a Viking-age longhouse, from about AD 930
- Reykjavík Art Museum – the largest visual art institution in Iceland
- Reykjavík Botanic Garden
- Reykjavík Maritime Museum – a maritime museum located by the old harbour
- Safnahúsið, culture house, National Centre for Cultural Heritage (Þjóðmenningarhúsið)
- Tjörnin – a small lake in central Reykjavík
- University of Iceland
- The Volcano Express - an immersive cinematic experience and flight simulator at Harpa Concert Hall

== Education ==
=== Secondary schools ===
- Borgarholtsskóli (Borgó)
- Fjölbrautaskólinn í Breiðholti (FB)
- Fjölbrautaskólinn við Ármúla (FÁ)
- Kvennaskólinn í Reykjavík (Kvennó)
- Menntaskólinn Hraðbraut
- Menntaskólinn í Reykjavík (MR)
- Menntaskólinn við Hamrahlíð (MH)
- Menntaskólinn við Sund (MS)
- Tækniskólinn
- Verzlunarskóli Íslands (Verzló)

=== Universities ===
- Iceland Academy of the Arts
- Reykjavík University
- University of Iceland

=== International schools ===
- International School of Iceland
- International Department at Landakotsskóli

=== Defunct schools ===
- Hvassaleitisskóli

== Sports ==
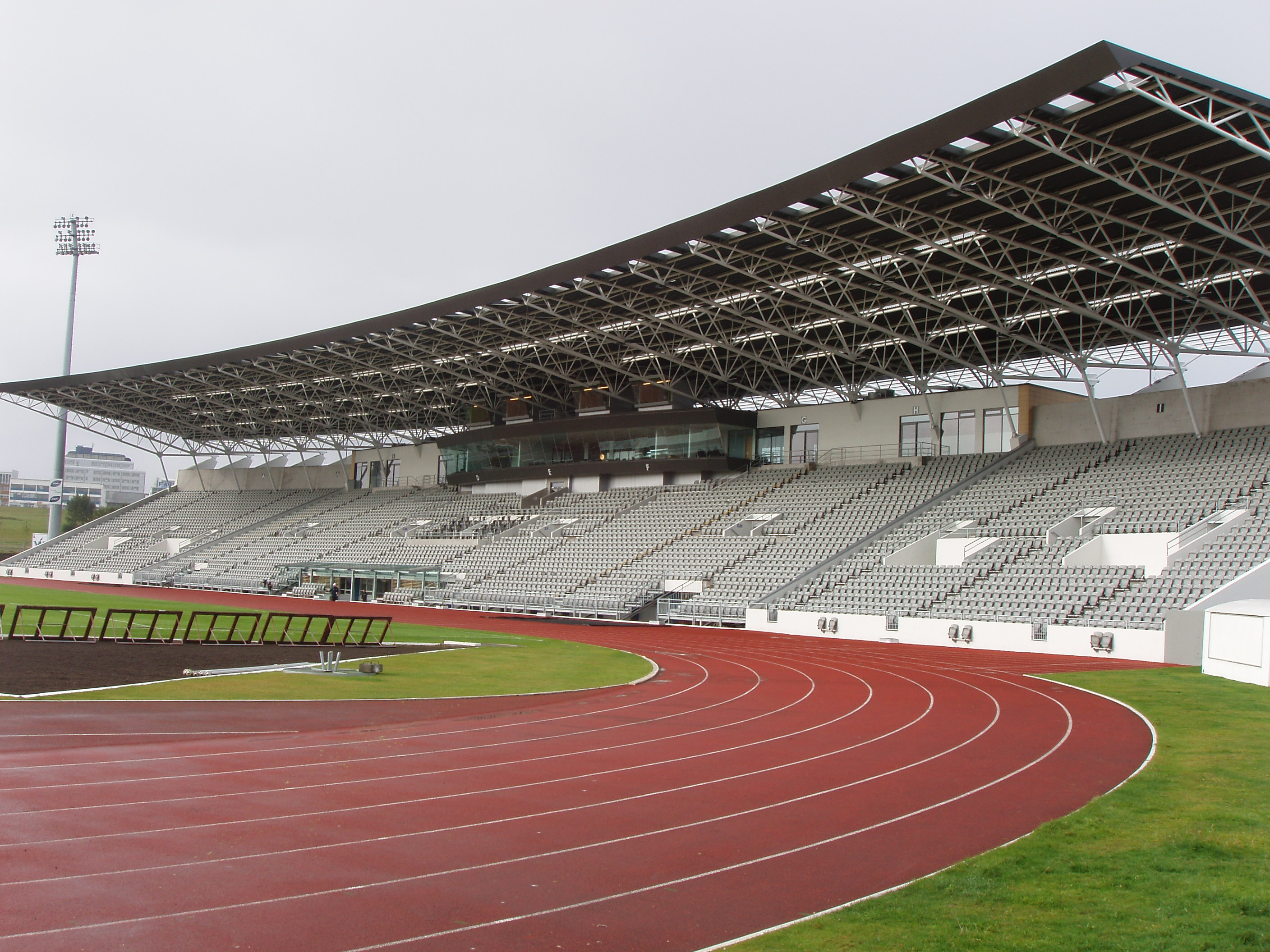
Laugardalsvöllur

=== Football teams ===
==== Úrvalsdeild ====
- Fram (Grafarholt og Úlfarsárdalur youth club)
- KR (Vesturbær youth club)
- Leiknir (Breiðholt youth club (Efra-Breiðholt))
- Valur (Hlíðar/Miðborg youth club)
- Víkingur (Háaleiti og Bústaðir youth club)

==== 1. deild karla ====
- Fjölnir (Grafarvogur youth club)
- Fylkir (Árbær youth club)
- Kórdrengir
- KV

==== Youth clubs ====
Clubs classified as youth clubs offer youth teams where anyone can train with the team, though each club is based in a certain area of Reykjavík and mainly serves that area.

- ÍR (Breiðholt youth club (Breiðholt)
- Þróttur (Laugardalur youth club)

=== Other clubs ===
Reykjavík Golf Club was established in 1934. It is the oldest and largest golf club in Iceland, and consists of two 18-hole courses – one at Grafarholt and the other at Korpa. The Grafarholt golf course opened in 1963, which makes it the oldest 18-hole golf course in Iceland. The Korpa golf course opened in 1997.

- Glímufélagið Ármann (sports club)
- Skautafélag Reykjavíkur (hockey)
- Skylmingafélag Reykjavíkur (fencing)
- Skotfélag Reykjavíkur (shooting)
- Íþróttafélag fatlaðra í Reykjavík (sports club for the disabled in Reykjavík)
- Rugbyfélag Reykjavíkur (rugby union)

== Twin towns – sister cities ==
Reykjavík is twinned with:

- Lviv, Ukraine (2023)
- Seattle, United States (1986)
- Vilnius, Lithuania (2006)
- Winnipeg, Canada (1971)
- Wrocław, Poland (2017)

In July 2013, mayor Jón Gnarr filed a motion before the city council to terminate the city's relationship with Moscow, in response to a trend of anti-gay legislation in Russia. Lviv in Ukraine replaced Moscow in 2023.

== Gallery ==
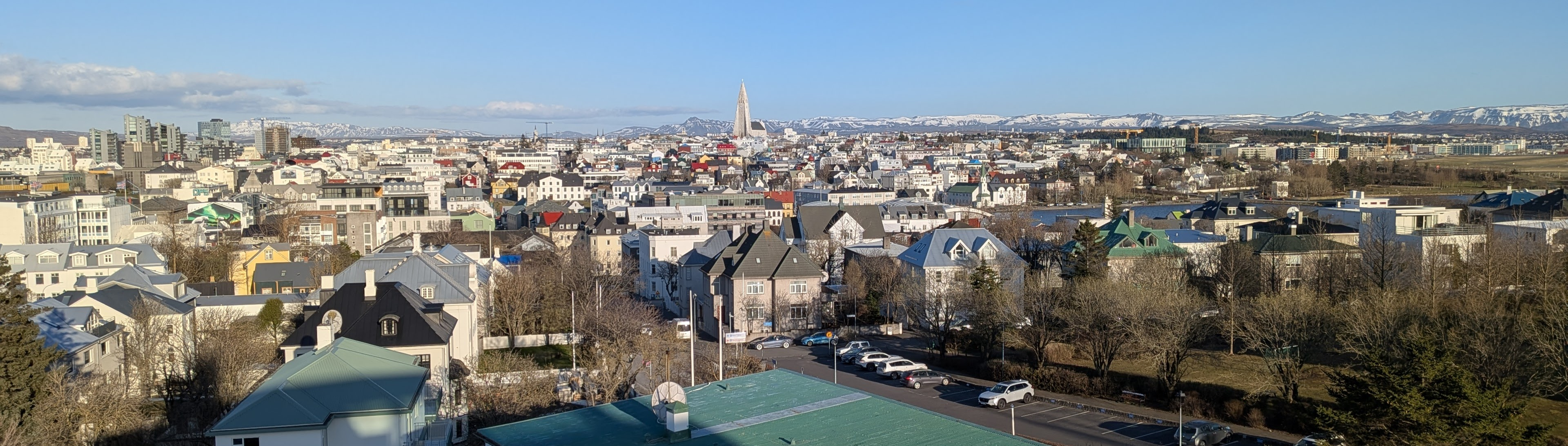
View of Reykjavík from Landakot hostpital

Harpa Hall, Downtown Reykjavík

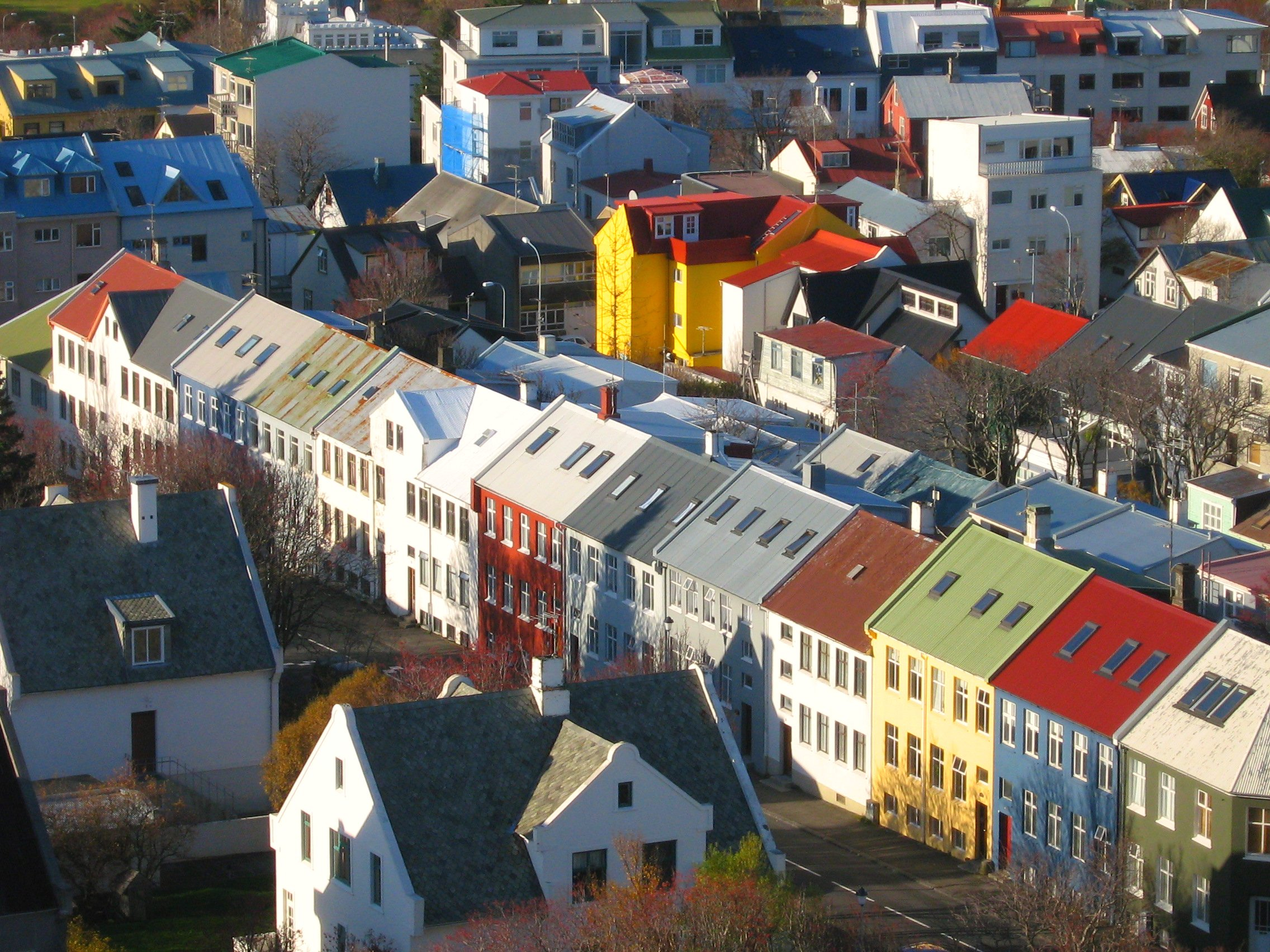
Colourful rooftops line Reykjavík

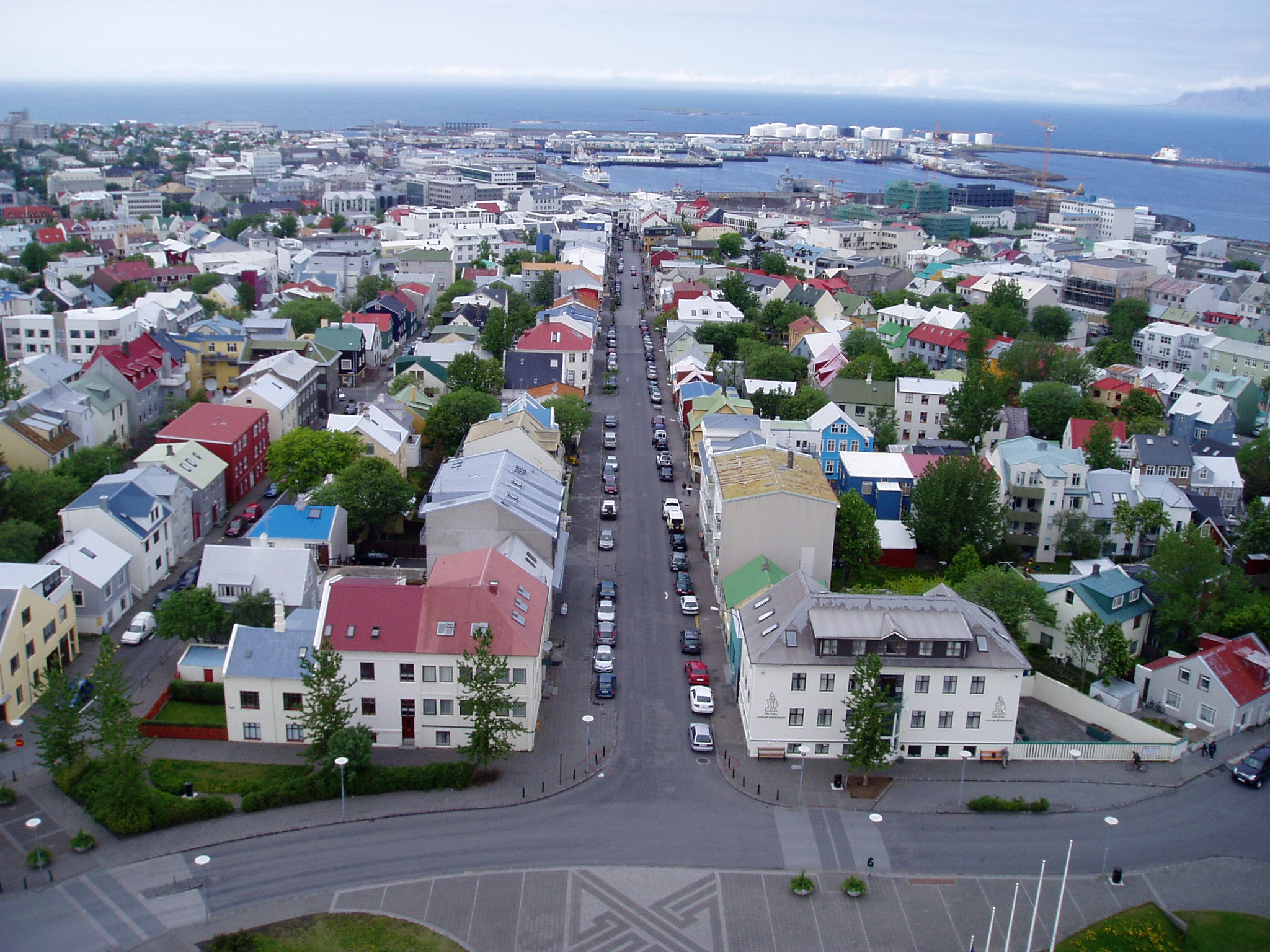
Central Reykjavík seen from Hallgrímskirkja

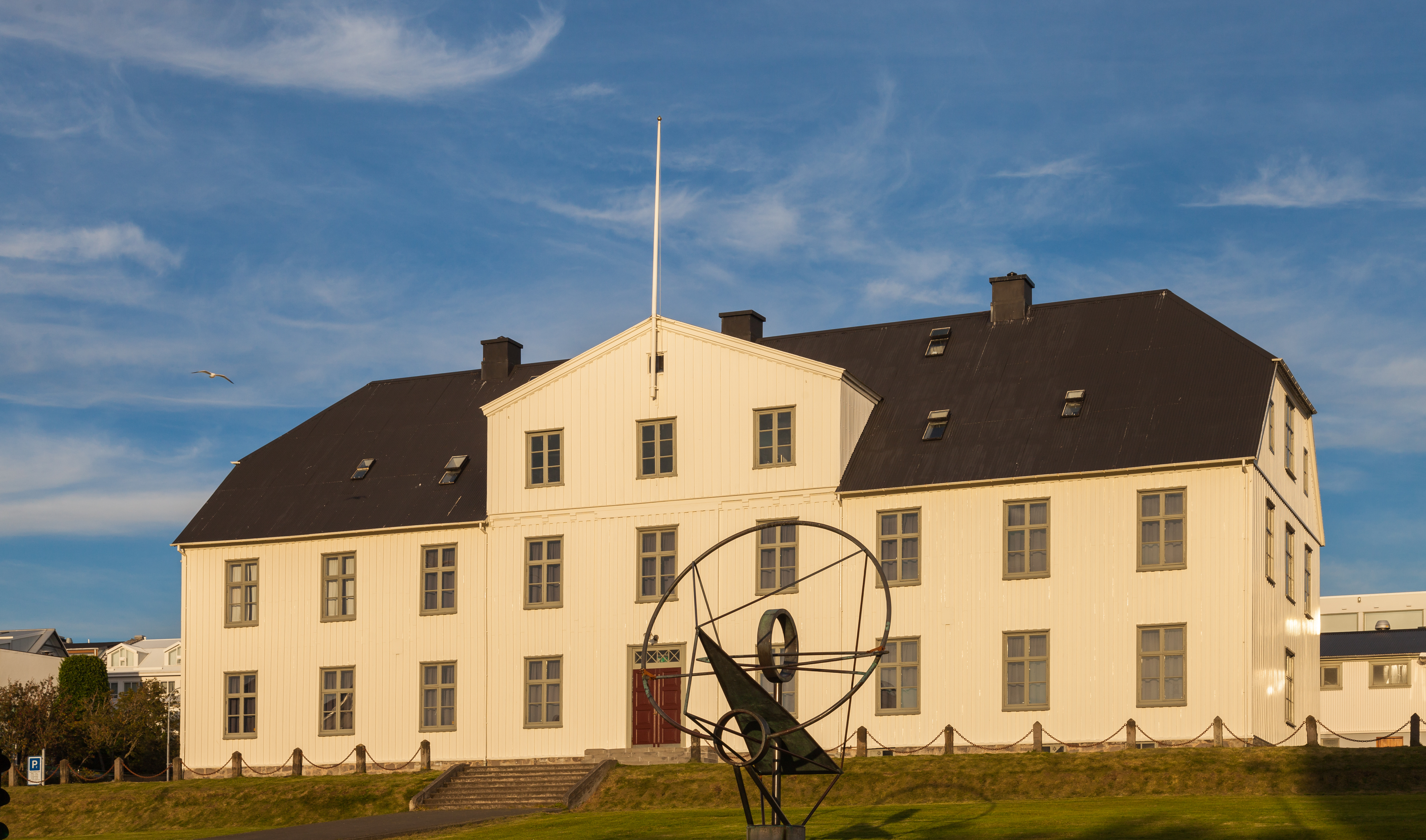
Menntaskólinn (Junior College) í Reykjavík or MR

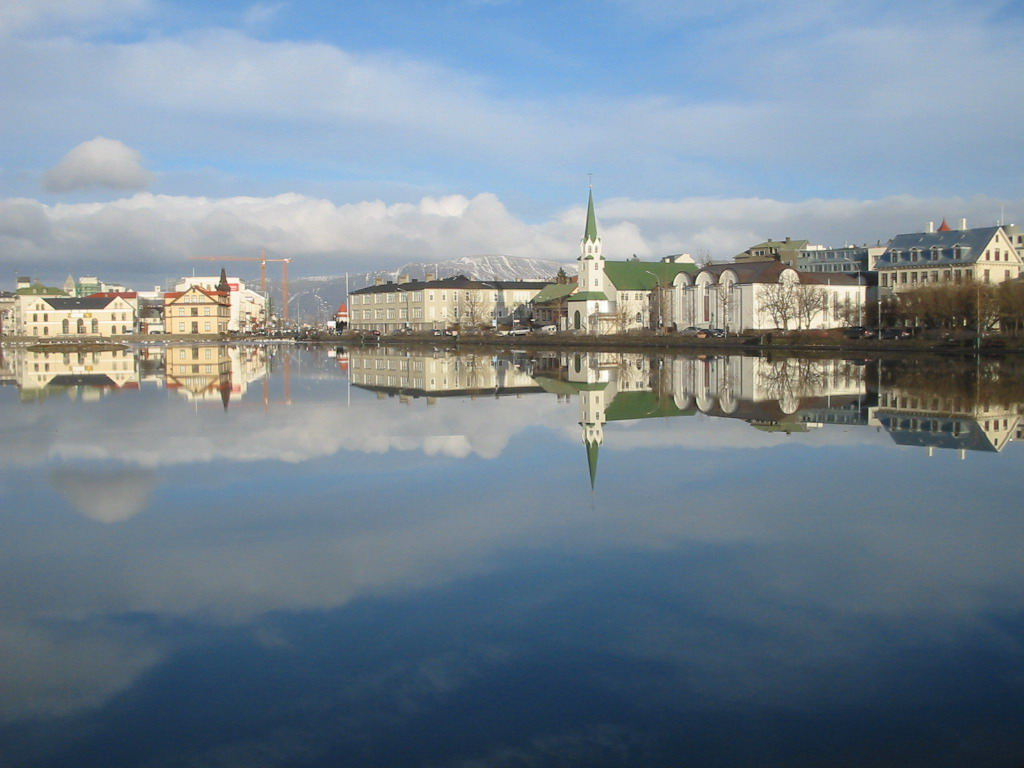
Tjörnin (The Pond) in Miðborg

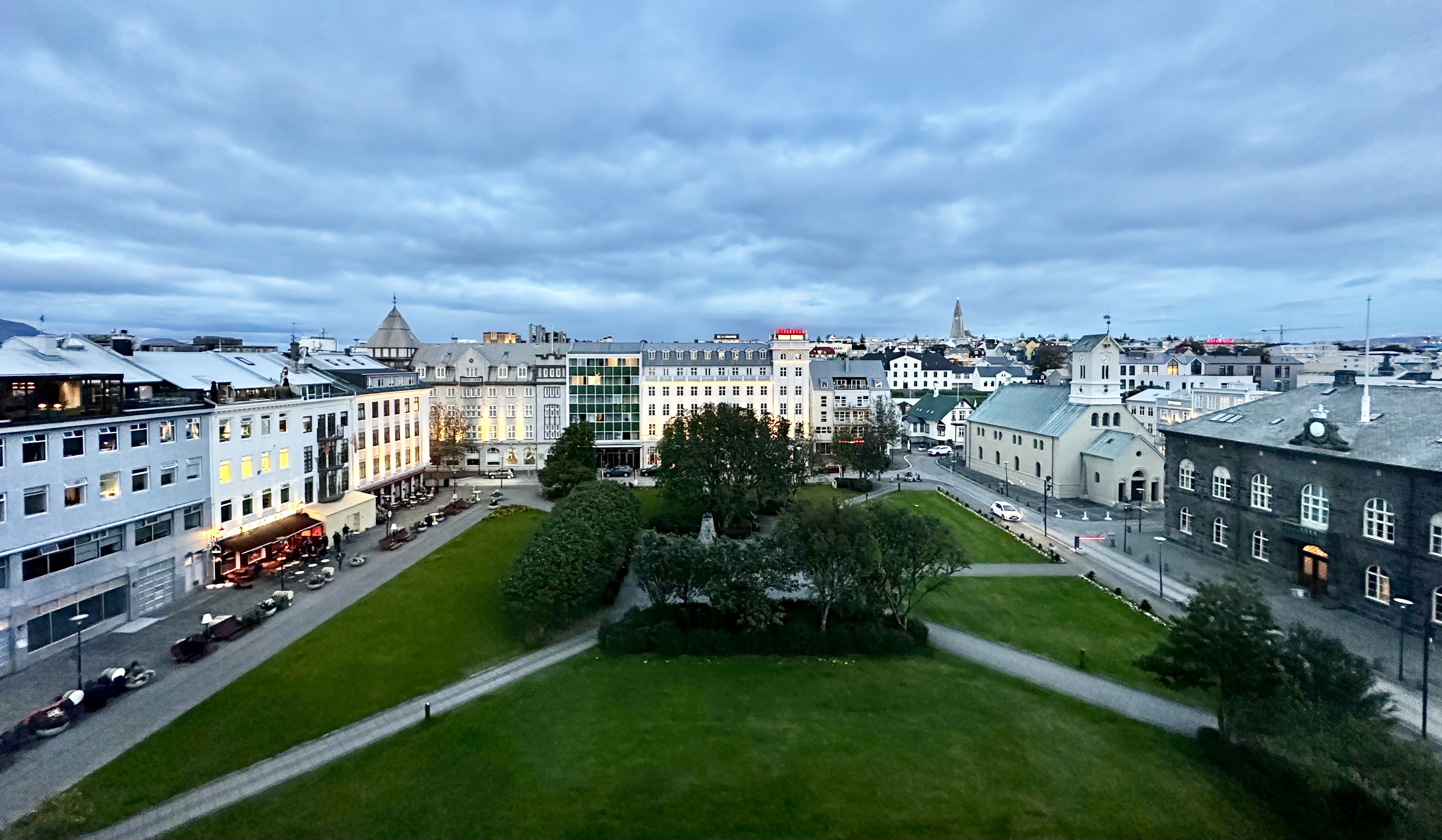
Austurvöllur with Reykjavík Cathedral and Parliament House (Alþingishúsið) visible on the right

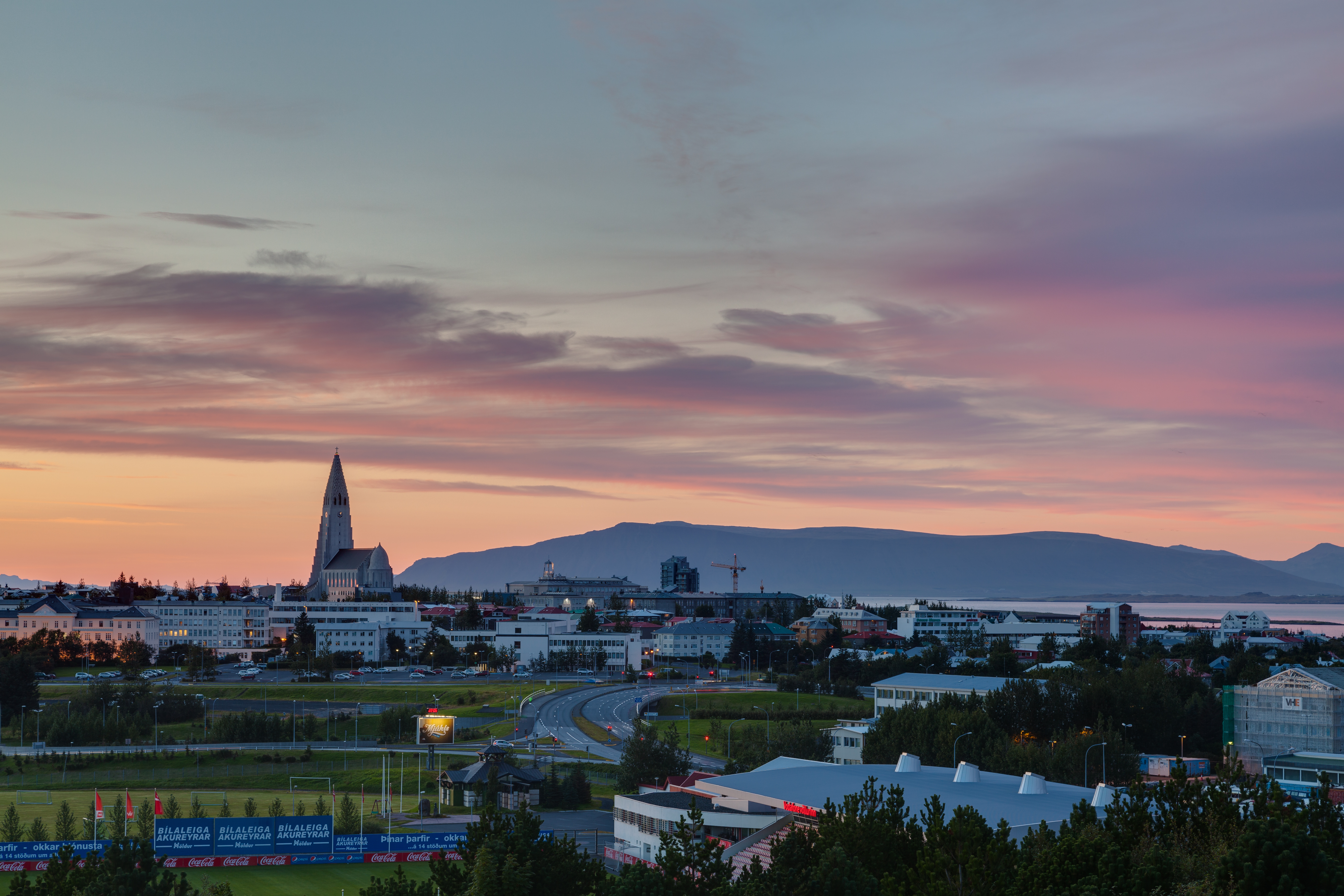
Reykjavík sunset from Perlan

== See also ==
- Althing, national parliament
- Beer Day (Iceland)
- Icelandic Phallological Museum
- Kringlan, a shopping mall
- Menningarnótt, an annual music festival
- Rail transport in Iceland
- Reykjavík Green Days, an environment-related annual event
- Reykjavik Open, an annual chess tournament
- Headphones On, a music video filmed around Reykjavík.

== Sources ==
- Hermannsdóttir, Edda (3 July 2006). "Consumption of alcoholic beverages 2005". Prices and consumption. Reykjavík: Hagstofa Íslands. Archived from the original on 14 December 2006.
