= Leitin =

Small shield volcano

Coordinates: 64.008056°N 21.543611°W

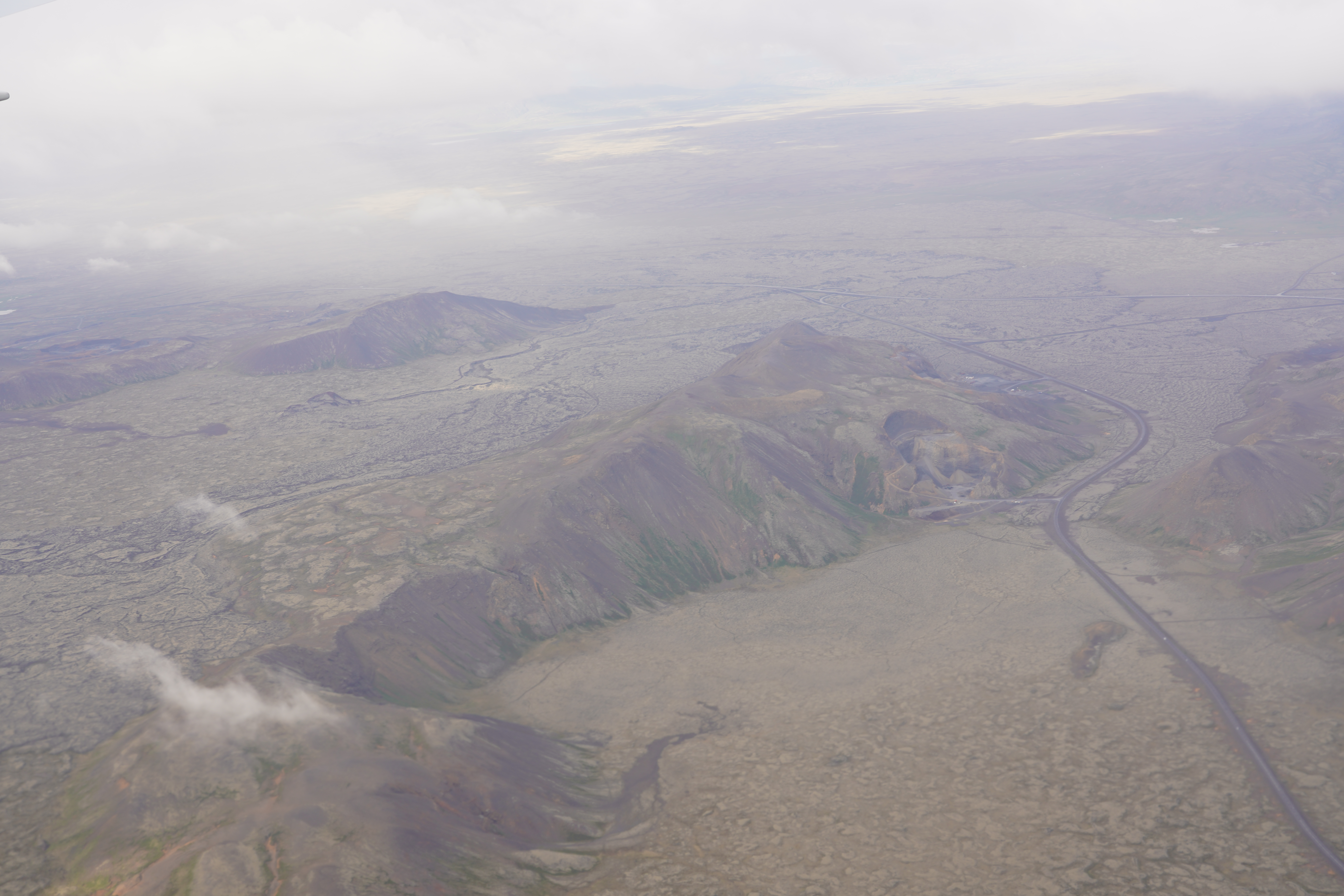
Aerial photograph of Hellisheiði: Lambafell in the foreground, behind it to the left the valley with the low shield of Leitin, Leitarhraun lavas and small craters of the Brennisteinsfjöll volcanic system

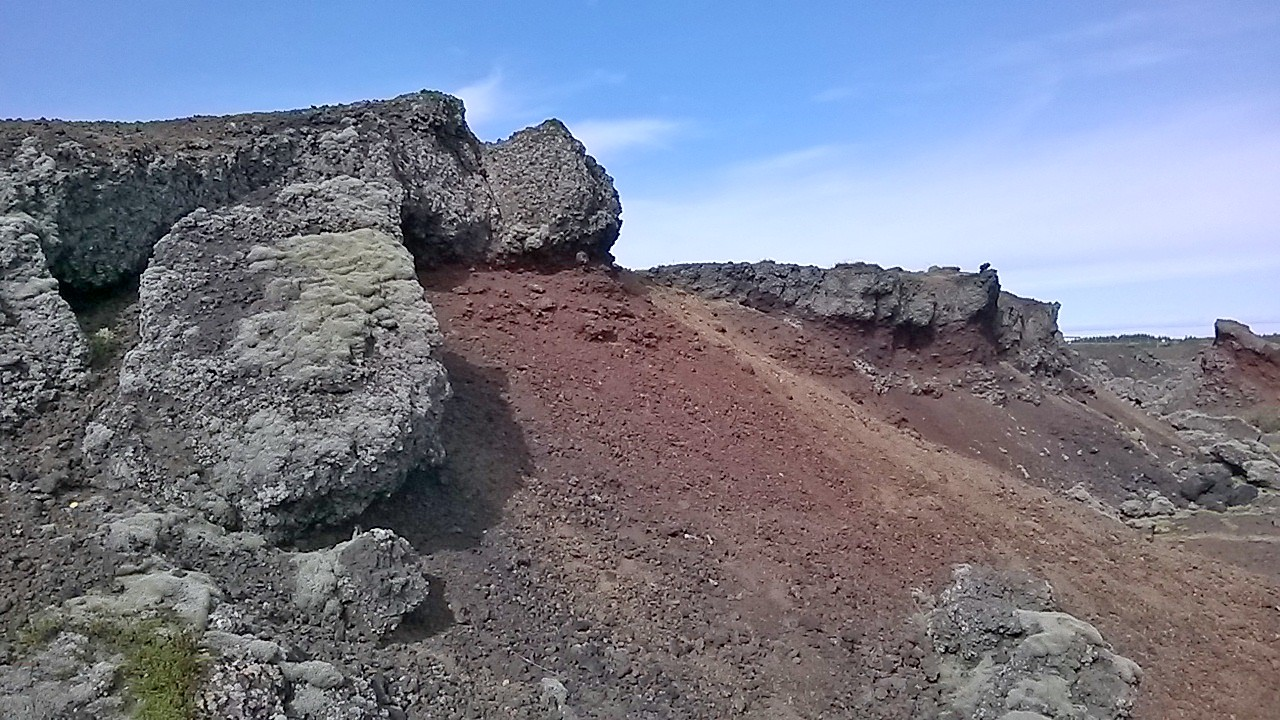
Rauðhólar

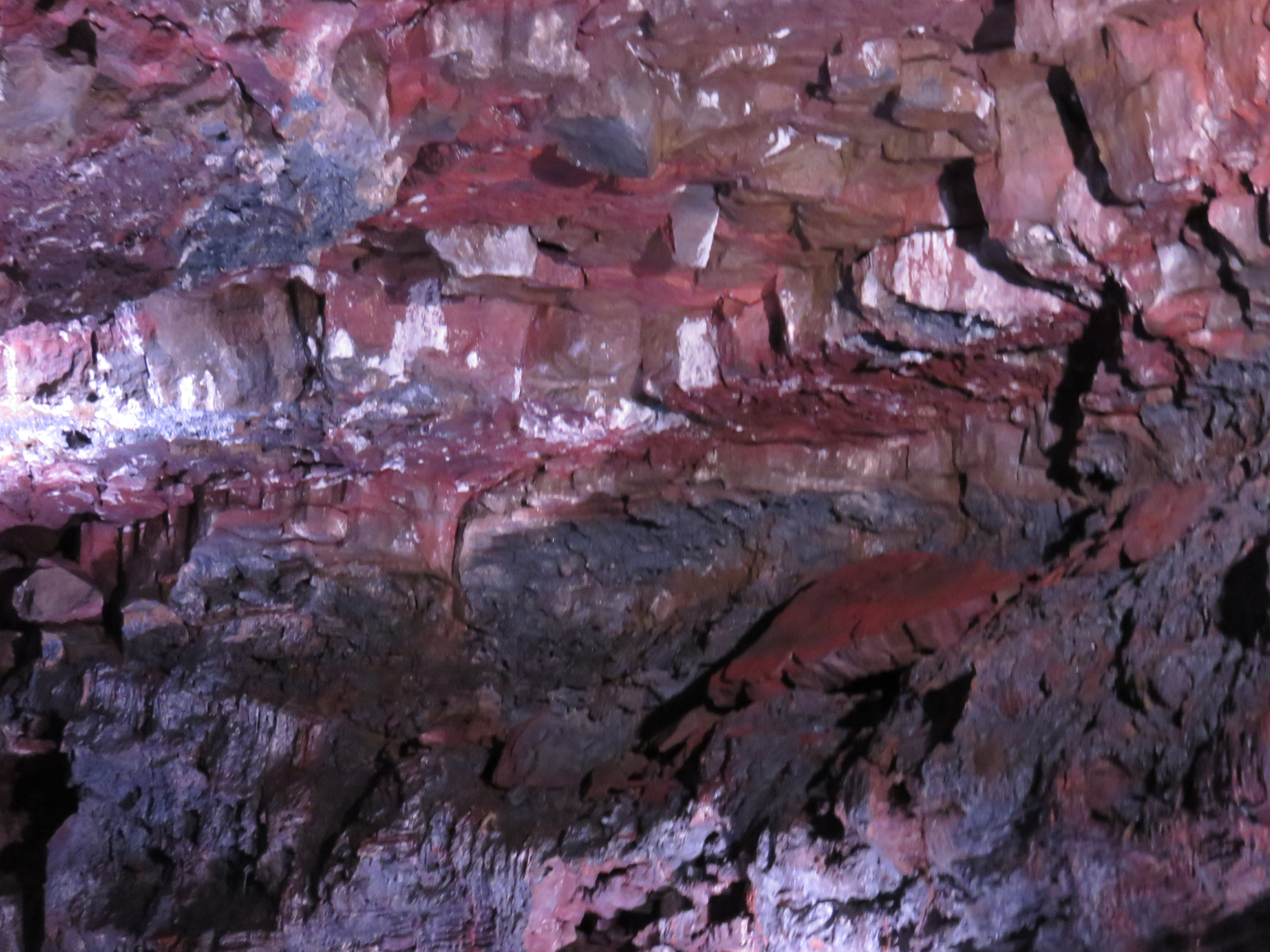
Within Raufarhólshellir lava tube

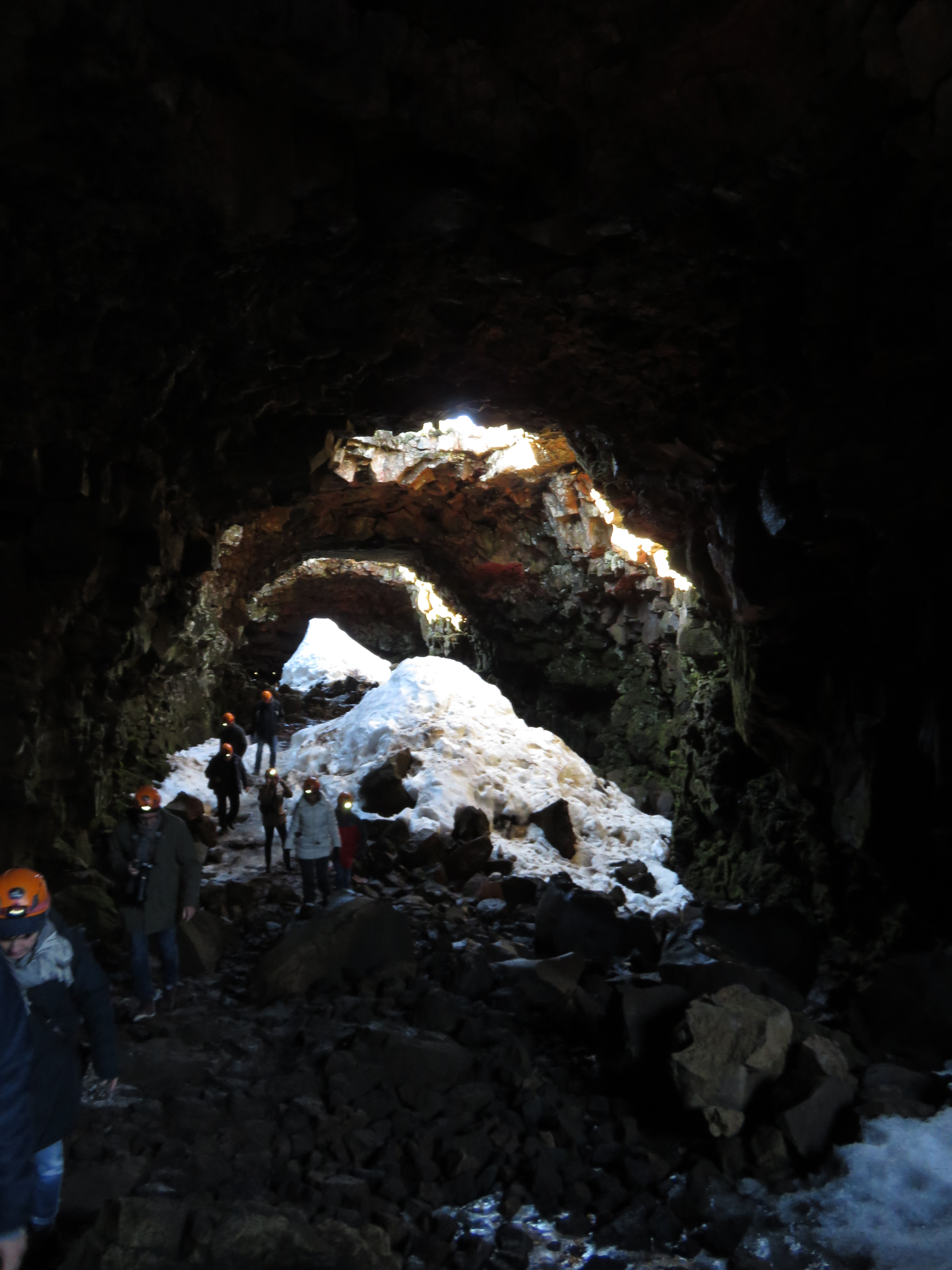
In the lava tube of Raufarhólshellir

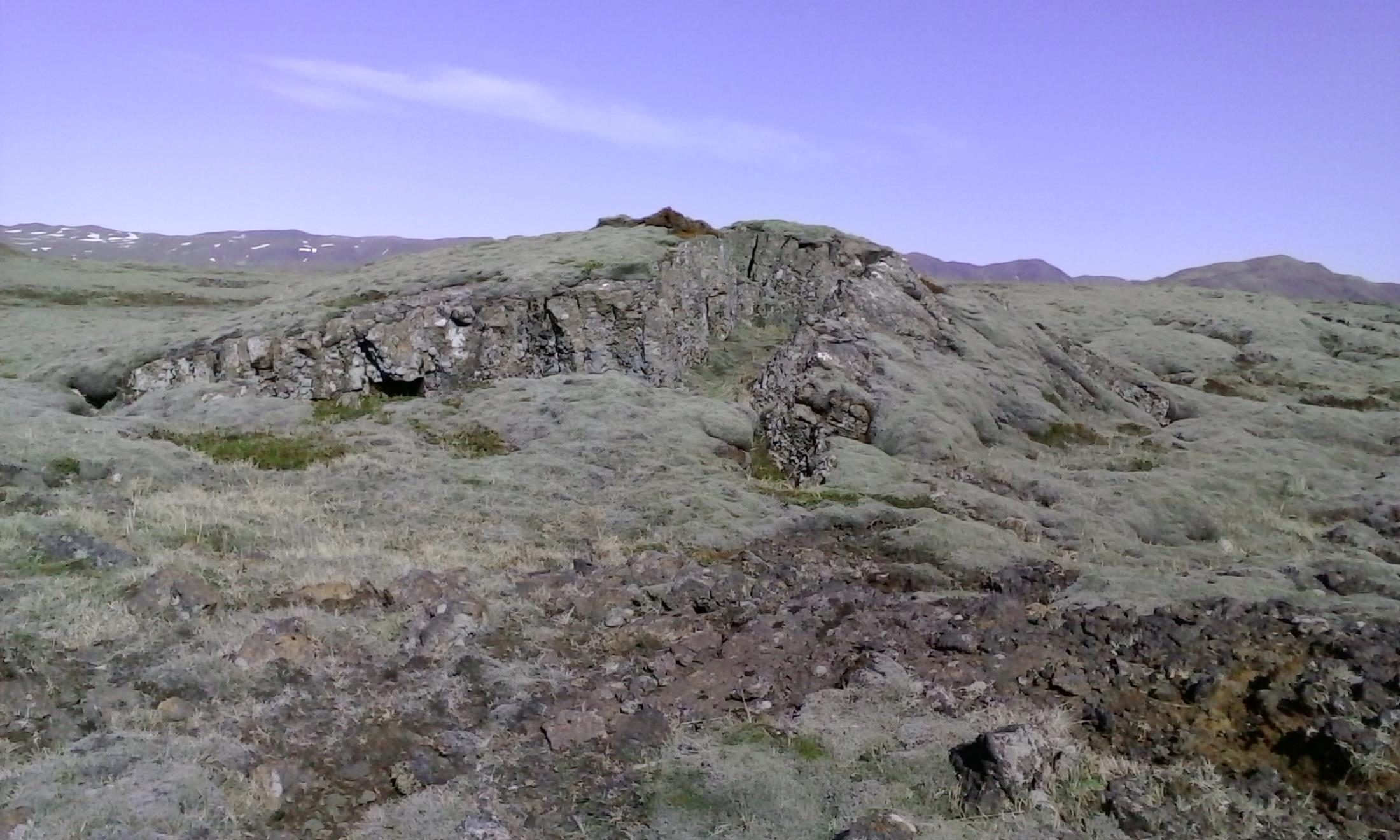
Leitarhraun with a (volcanogenic) tumulus in the foreground, Bláfjöll in the background

Leitin (Icelandic pronunciation: [ˈleiːtɪn]) is a small shield volcano in the southwest of Iceland.

== Name ==
Leitin ("the hills") is sometimes also called Leiti [ˈleiːtɪ] ("hills") or Leitahraun [ˈleiːtaˌr̥œyːn] after its eruption products (“the lava of Leiti”).

== Geography ==
The lava shield is located on the big Reykjanes peninsula some 25 km south of Reykjavík.

When travelling on the hringvegur and looking to the west, the volcano is to be seen in a broad valley between the palagonite ridges of Lambafell [ˈlampaˌfɛtl̥] with its quarries and Sauðadalahnúkar [ˈsœyːðaˌtaːlaˌn̥uːkar̥] and behind some small cones, the Nyrðri [ˈnɪrðrɪ] and Syðri Eldborg [ˈsɪðrɪ ˈɛltˌpɔrk], eruptive vents of the Brennisteinsfjöll volcanic system.

== Geology and volcanism ==
The Holocene shield volcano Leitin is itself also part of the Brennisteinsfjöll volcanic system and therefore of the Reykjanes Volcanic Belt.

It originated in a probably long drawn, mostly effusive eruption, ca. 5000 years ago.

This small volcano produced an astonishing quantity of lavas reaching like a girdle over the peninsula of Reykjanes, entering the sea to the north next to the present capital city of Iceland Reykjavík as well as to the south in the bay of Selvogur. Today, these lavas are partially covered by younger lava flows.

=== Lava flows and fields: Leitahraun, Svínahraun, Elliðahraun ===
Part of the Leitahraun lava flows travelled to the west against the valley opening between Sauðadalahnúkar and Lambafell and then to the north. People of the region call the lava field here Svínahraun [ˈsviːnaˌr̥œyːn].

But actually, the Svínahraun is composed of 3 lava layers, all from the same volcanic system, the Brennisteinsfjöll, but from different times. The lowermost layer is the 5000 year old Leitahraun, in between is a 2000 year old lava, more or less from the same time as the eruptions in the neighbouring Hengill system, and the uppermost layer is the Kristnitökuhraun [ˈkʰrɪstnɪˌtʰœːkʏˌr̥œyːn] or Svínahraunsbruni [ˈsviːnaˌr̥œynsˌprʏːnɪ] emitted by the small craters Nyðri and Syðri Eldborg in the year 1000.

Acc. to Medieval sources, this lava, the Kristnitökuhraun (“Christianisation-Lava”), is connected to a special story: When in June of the year 1000, Christian vikings were discussing with pagan ones at Þingvellir, if all Icelanders should become Christians, a messenger came running from Hellisheiði and called out: “There is a fire up there.” After the decision was made, that all Icelanders—willing or not—should leave the pagan gods behind, some said that it were the wrath of the pagan gods that had caused the eruption.

Some parts of the Leitahraun travelled to the south, over the mountain pass of Þrengsli [ˈθreiŋstlɪ] and reached the coast not far from today’s fisher village of Þorlákshöfn.

Part of the northern Leitahraun flows is also called Elliðahraun [ˈɛtlɪːðaˌr̥œyːn], because it followed the course of the river Elliðaár where outcrops are to be found in the valley.

=== Other connected volcanic landforms ===
This Elliðahraun travelled about 27 km down to today’s Reykjavík, and on its way it initiated explosions on a swamp or more probably on small lake which produced the rootless cone group Rauðhólar. The pseudocraters are located immediately at the western side of the Hringvegur when entering the city from the south.

The same lava flow branch produced other interesting landforms like the group of hornitos, called Tröllabörn [ˈtʰrœtlaˌpœ(r)tn̥], some 10 km up the Hringvegur in the direction of Hellisheiði and again on its western side. They are under nature protection.

The Hringvegur itself is also for a good part constructed on top of these lavas.

The southern Leitahraun produced a.o. multi colored lava tubes of which the best known are Búri [ˈpuːrɪ] and Raufarhólshellir, situated between the south coast of Reykjanes and the pass of Þrengsli on Hellisheiði.

== Visitor attractions ==
Whereas the volcano itself is rather remote, some of its eruption products like the Rauðhólar rootless cone group or the Raufarhólshellir lava tube which can be visited with guided tours are well known visitor attractions.
