= Breiðholt =

Coordinates: 64°06′28″N 21°49′56″W

- District
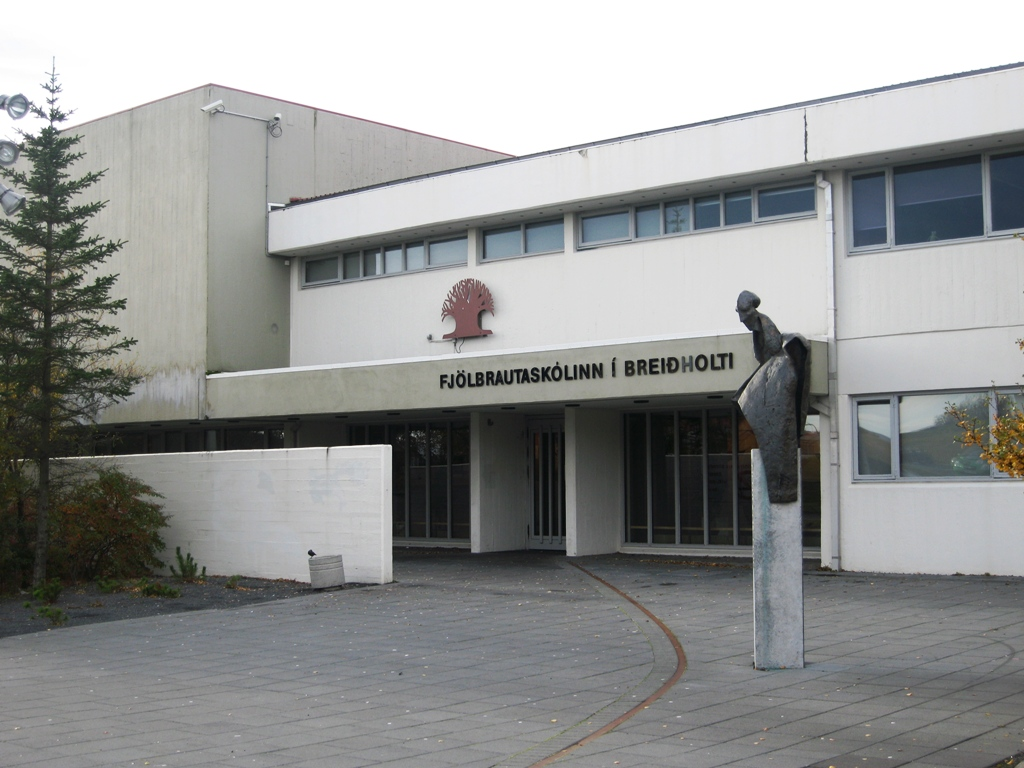
- Entrance to the secondary school in Breiðholt

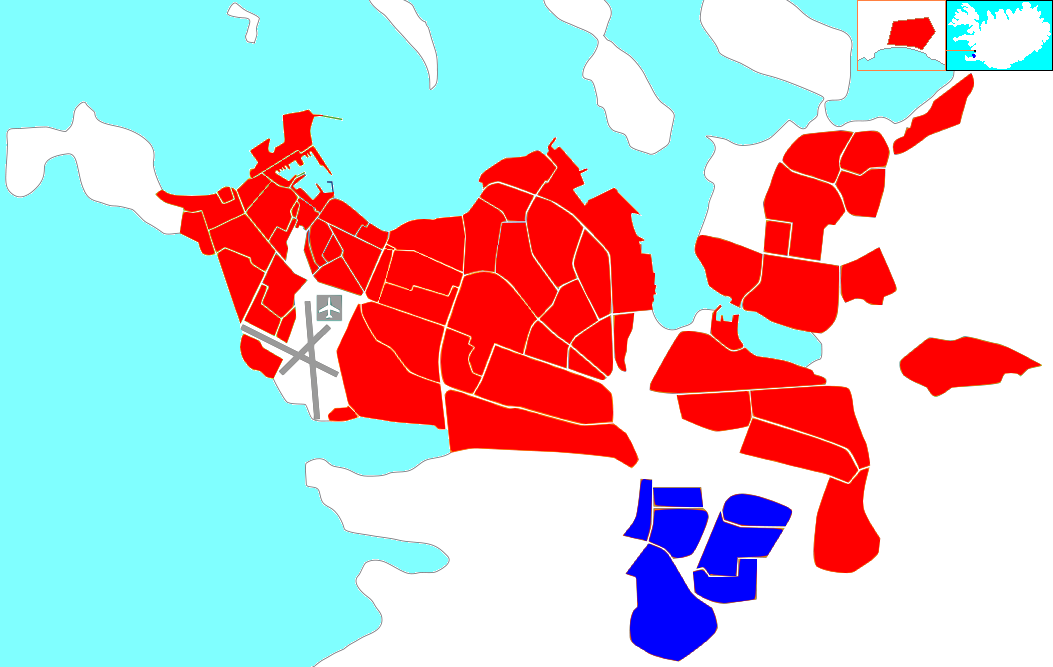
- Country: Iceland
- Municipality: Reykjavík

Area
  - District: 5.5 km^{2} (2.1 sq mi)
  - Urban: 4.7 km^{2} (1.8 sq mi)

Population (2023)
  - District: 22.795
  - Density: 4.1/km^{2} (11/sq mi)
- Postal code: IS-109, IS-111

Breiðholt (Icelandic pronunciation: [ˈpreiðˌhɔl̥t]) is a southeastern district of Reykjavík, Iceland. It includes three neighbourhoods: Neðra-Breiðholt ([ˈnɛðra-ˌpreiðˌhɔl̥t], Bakkar; [ˈpahkar̥], Mjódd; [ˈmjoutː], and Stekkir; [ˈstɛhcɪr̥]), Efra-Breiðholt ([ˈɛvra-ˌpreiðˌhɔl̥t], Hólar; [ˈhouːlar̥], Berg; [ˈpɛrk], and Fell; [ˈfɛtl̥]) and Seljahverfi ([ˈsɛljaˌkʰvɛrvɪ], Sel; [ˈsɛːl̥]). It is one of the largest districts in Reykjavík, with a population of around 20,000.

The neighborhood has the highest amount of foreign-born residents of any in Reykjavík.

== History ==
Breiðholt was originally a farm, first mentioned in the 10th century, in recent times a small village. From the end of World War II to 1960, the population of Reykjavík grew from 46,578 to 72,270. Inadequate housing had been a significant problem, forcing many families to live in the cold, frail barracks that the British and American armies had left behind. In 1965, Breiðholt was mostly an outer boundary to the inhabited areas of Reykjavík.

During the 1960s, Reykjavík underwent an unprecedented boom period, and in 1962 work began implementing zoning plans for all of Reykjavík, lasting until 1983, and Italian architect Aldo Rossi was influential in the development. Due to population pressure in the 1960s, development plans were published for Breiðholt in 1966 in the hills east of the city, with the idea of building single-family houses and low-priced apartment buildings mixed together. Breiðholt was divided into three smaller neighborhoods. The first part (lower Breiðholt) arose between 1966–1973, the second in 1980 and the third in 1985. In 1999, Breiðholt was the highest populated area in Reykjavik with 22,030 inhabitants, but as of 2012 the population had fallen to 20,546.

The film Children is set in this suburb of the Icelandic capital, and portrays a grittiness which is in "stark contrast to the tourist-friendly portrayal of Reykjavík."

== Landmarks ==
The district contains a large school which serves the wider area and has a significant foreign population and several colleges and other schools which have sprung up in recent times, and it also contains the 25 metre Breiðholtslaug leisure pool, the Landsbankinn building, and the SAMfilms studios next to it. To the southeast is Lake Elliðavatn, fed by the Elliðaár river which flows through the district, and to the east is Lake Rauðavatn.
