= Rauðhólar =

Rauðhólar may refer to the following volcanic landforms:

- Rauðhólar (Reykjavík), Iceland
- Rauðhólar (Vesturdalur), Iceland
