= Árbær =

Coordinates: 64.118°N 21.818°W

- District
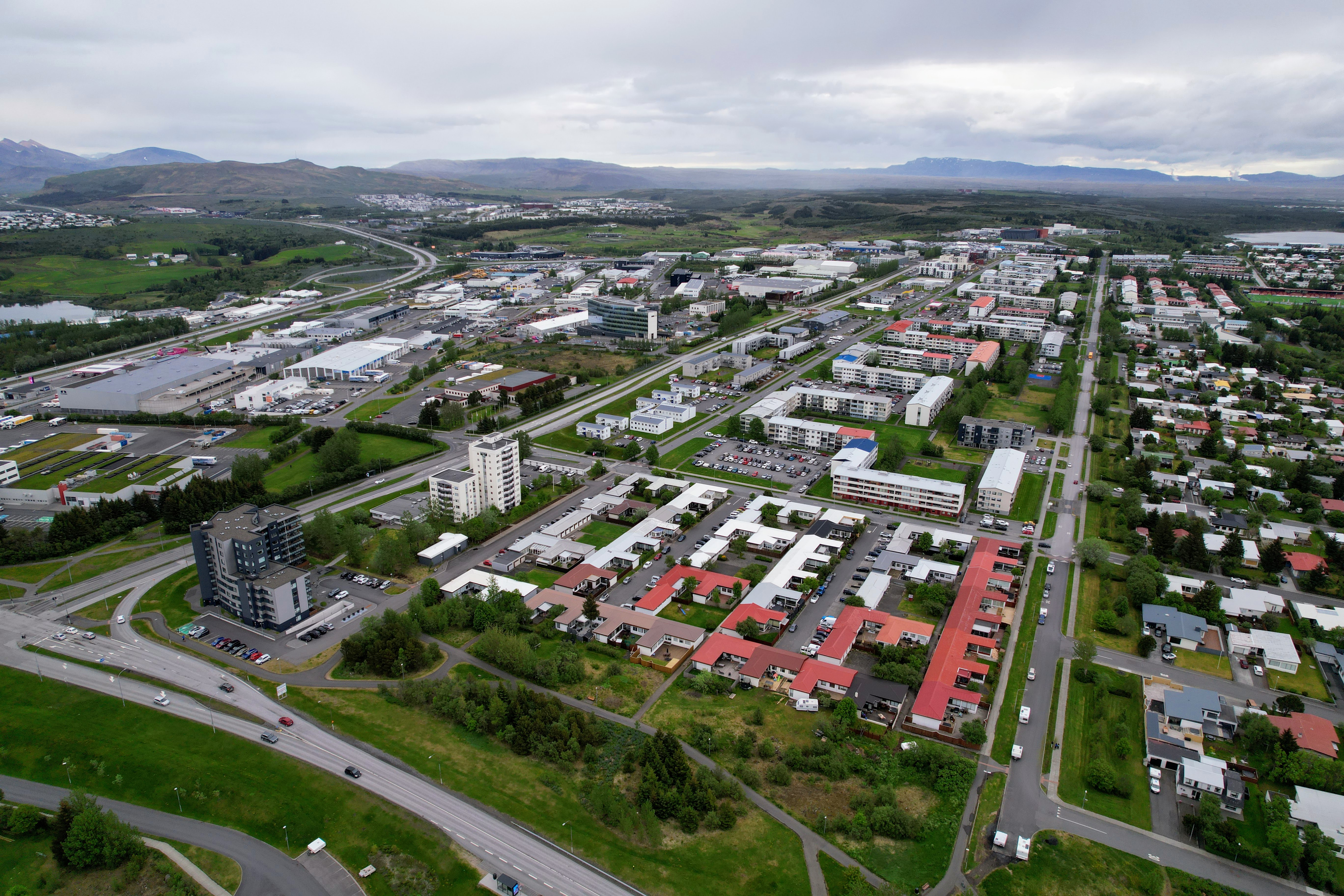

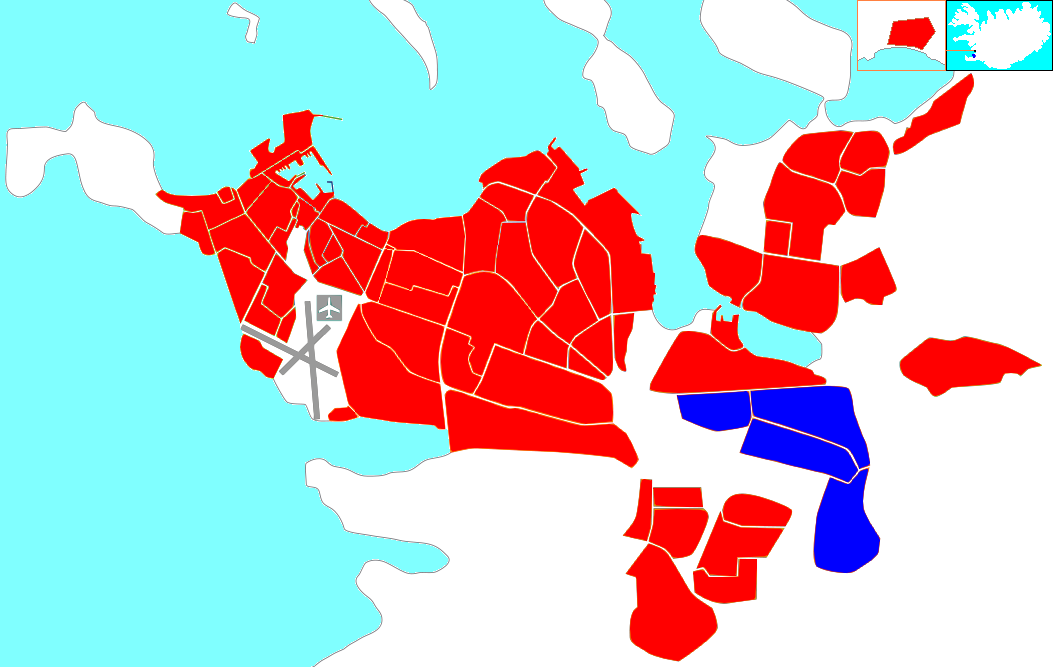
- Country: Iceland
- Municipality: Reykjavík

Area
  - District: 6.1 km^{2} (2.4 sq mi)
  - Urban: 3.8 km^{2} (1.5 sq mi)

Population (2010)
  - District: 10,000
  - Density: 1,600/km^{2} (4,200/sq mi)
- Postal code: IS-110

Árbær (Icelandic pronunciation: [ˈaurˌpaiːr̥]) is a district within the city of Reykjavík, Iceland. It includes five neighbourhoods: Árbær proper, Ártúnsholt [ˈaurˌtʰunsˌhɔl̥t], Norðlingaholt [ˈnɔ(r)tliŋkaˌhɔlt̥], Selás [ˈsɛːlˌauːs] and the industrial area Hálsar [ˈhaulsar̥]. The area has approximately 11.974 inhabitants in 2023.

It is located in the eastern part of the city. At the heart of Árbær are the Elliðaár river and valley.

== History ==
The core residential part was built in the 1960s to 1970s in a Nordic functionalistic style, similar to nearby Breiðholt. Development of the outer parts started in the 1980s and continued well into the 1990s. The 2000s saw the construction of Norðlingaholt at the eastern edge of the city, as well as a new commercial lot adjacent to the oldest part.

== Sport ==
The local sports club is Fylkir, who play in the Icelandic Premier League and are two times Icelandic Men's Football Cup winners. The upper part of the valley is also a centre for horseback riding in the city, offering facilities and designated tracks.

== Sights ==
- Árbæjarsafn
- Rauðhólar
- Elliðaár
