= Heiðmörk =

Conservation area in Reykjavík, Iceland

Coordinates: 64°04′03″N 21°45′51″W

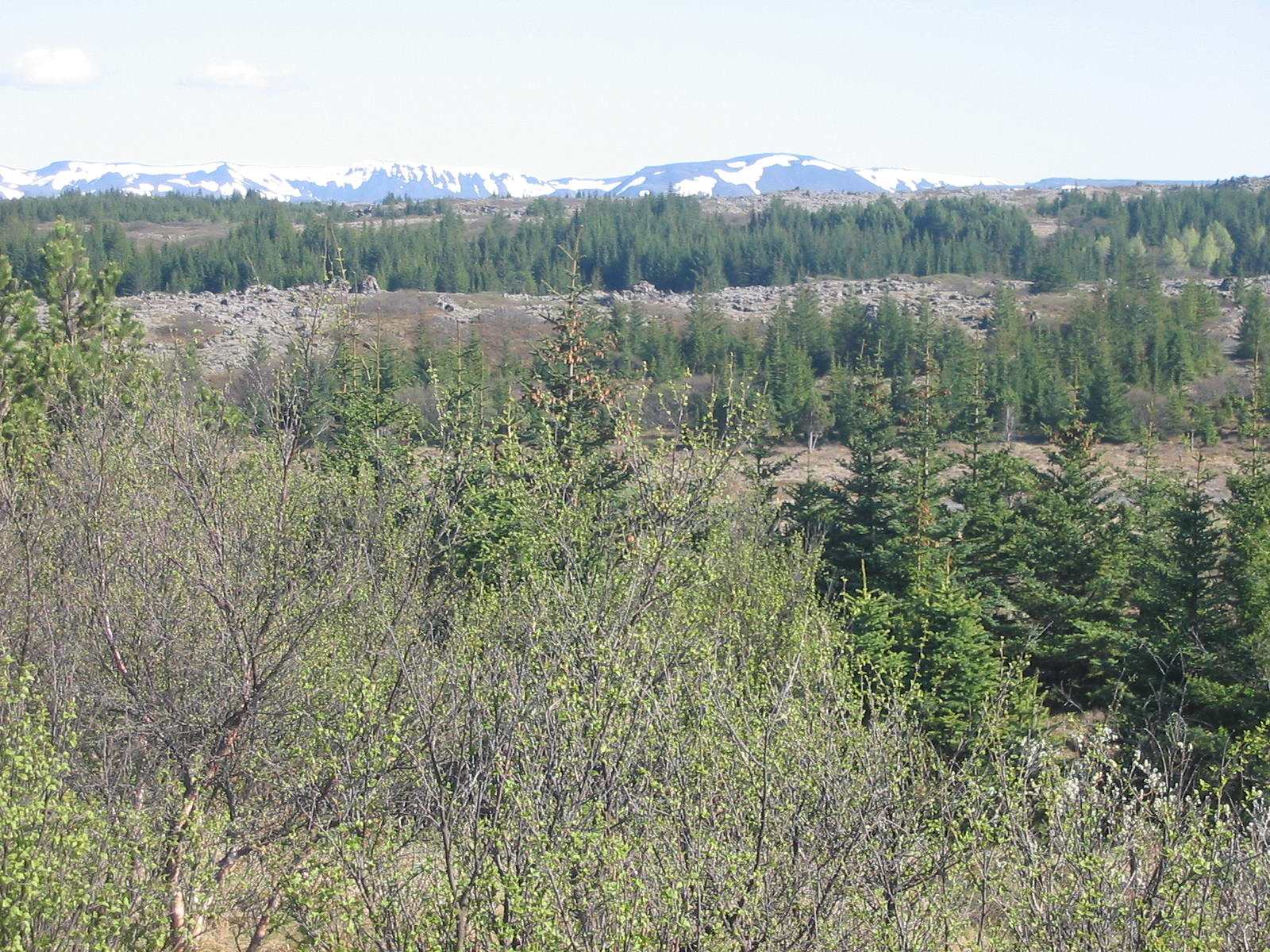
Heiðmörk reserve, Iceland.

Heiðmörk (Icelandic pronunciation: [ˈheiðˌmœr̥k]) was proclaimed a municipal conservation area of Reykjavík in 1950. It is located southeast of Elliðavatn, Iceland, and is about 10 kilometres (6.2 mi) from central Reykjavík. Its name is derived from its namesake in Norway, Hedmark (both derive from the Old Norse Heiðmǫrk [ˈhɛiðˌmɔrk]), an area with deep forests.

The total area of the conservation area is 3,200 hectares (7,900 acres). It is a popular recreational area in Iceland. Heiðmörk is where Reykjavík's water reservoirs and drinking water wells are located.

Rauðhólar are a notable natural formation of Heiðmörk, a cluster of red coloured pseudocraters.

== Flora ==
More than 4 million trees have been planted since 1950 and the existing vegetation has thrived since the area has been fenced off. The most prominent of the 26 species of trees at Heiðmörk is the Sitka Spruce and at least 150 wild flower species have been counted.

== Fauna ==
More than 60 species of wild birds have been counted, especially around Elliðavatn and Myllulækjartjörn.

== Recreational area ==
Tree planting in Heidmork began in the summer of 1949 in so-called Teygingar on the heathland above the old farm of Elliðavatn (Elliðavatnsheiði). There were planted 8,000 Scots pine (Pinus sylvestris), 500 Norway spruce (Picea abies), and 500 Sitka spruce (Picea sitchensis) which now form a part of the woodland in Heiðmörk now known as Undanfari. Scots pine is scattered near Undanfara and on Elliðavatnsheiði, and probably some can be traced back to the first planting in Heiðmörk. It is worth mentioning that the spring of 1949 was one of the coldest during the 20th century. The forest in Heiðmörk now covers 820 ha of conifer and 650 ha of birch in gross profit. Reykjavík Forestry Association has supervised and managed the afforestation in Heiðmörk from the starting point. Reykjavík Municipal Work School has done an invaluable work on the premises and the teenagers continue their work in the summer.

Since Heiðmörk was opened “pioneers” have worked in Heiðmörk. At first 50 strips of land were allotted to these groups of pioneers (often comprising societies of individuals), and each allotment was on the scale of 1–5 ha. Now there are approximately 140 “pioneer plots” altogether. The plots have been allotted to associations and groups within this field of interest for planting and outdoor recreational area. The associations are supplied with tree seedlings, equipment, fertilizer, and guidance as needed by Reykjavík Forestry Association in return for planting and keeping the area clean. Proprietary right does not comply with the plots, but it is marked the party in question. In latter years there are increasingly more groups which are making footpaths, thinning, and installing benches and alike, each at their own patch. In the recent years there have been 20–30 groups taking an active part in the planting process, and every year the number of groups increases by 2–4 new ones.

The function of Reykjavík Forestry Association as a guardian and the prime executive power in Heiðmörk has naturally undergone considerable changes. At first the activities was mainly about conservation, planting and rehabilitation of severe damaged ecosystems, and in addition improvement of accessibility was made through road and path constructions. In latter years the activity partakes in managing this frequently-visited outdoor-forest in the country. It entails emphasis on development and management of important infrastructure, such as paths, rest stops, and educational and information signs as well as tending forest. In recent years the emphasis has been on thinning pieces of forest with the aim of improving the quality of the forest for outdoor life, and in addition gaining by-products made of wood. New forest planting is now primarily done in areas with lupine-fields, whereas before it was mainly on heathland. Reykjavík Forestry Association and Reykjavík School of Nature operate a solid and reliable education program which is held mainly in the shelter of the forest. Furthermore, an education room has been set up in the old house of stone at Elliðavatn, the birthplace of the poet Einar Benediktsson.

In the beginning the conservation area was confined to the lava field Hólmshraun, Elliðavatnsheiði, and a part of Vatnsenda estate, and the area was then 1,350 ha. A contract with public hospitals in 1957 for a 950 ha strip of land in the estate of Vífilstaðir, Heiðmörk was extended to 2,300 ha. Finally in 1964 Reykjavík city council consigned the landholding of Elliðavatn to Reykjavík Forestry Association for conservation, and Heiðmörk progressed to about 3,000 ha.

The Association's contract of management with the City of Reykjavík and Reykjavík Energy which was made in the beginning of 2013 Heiðmörk was enlarged to Suðurlandsvegur (the main road between Reykjavík and South Iceland), into 3,200 ha. Rauðhólar was within the Heiðmörk fence and became a conservation area as natural monument in 1961, and a public field in 1974.

Heiðmörk is the principal outdoor recreational area in the capital and district. Its attraction grows in accordance with enriched vegetation, and every year the number of visiting guests increases. Surveys show more visitors in Heiðmörk than in the national park at Þingvellir.
