= Rauðavatn =

Lake in Iceland

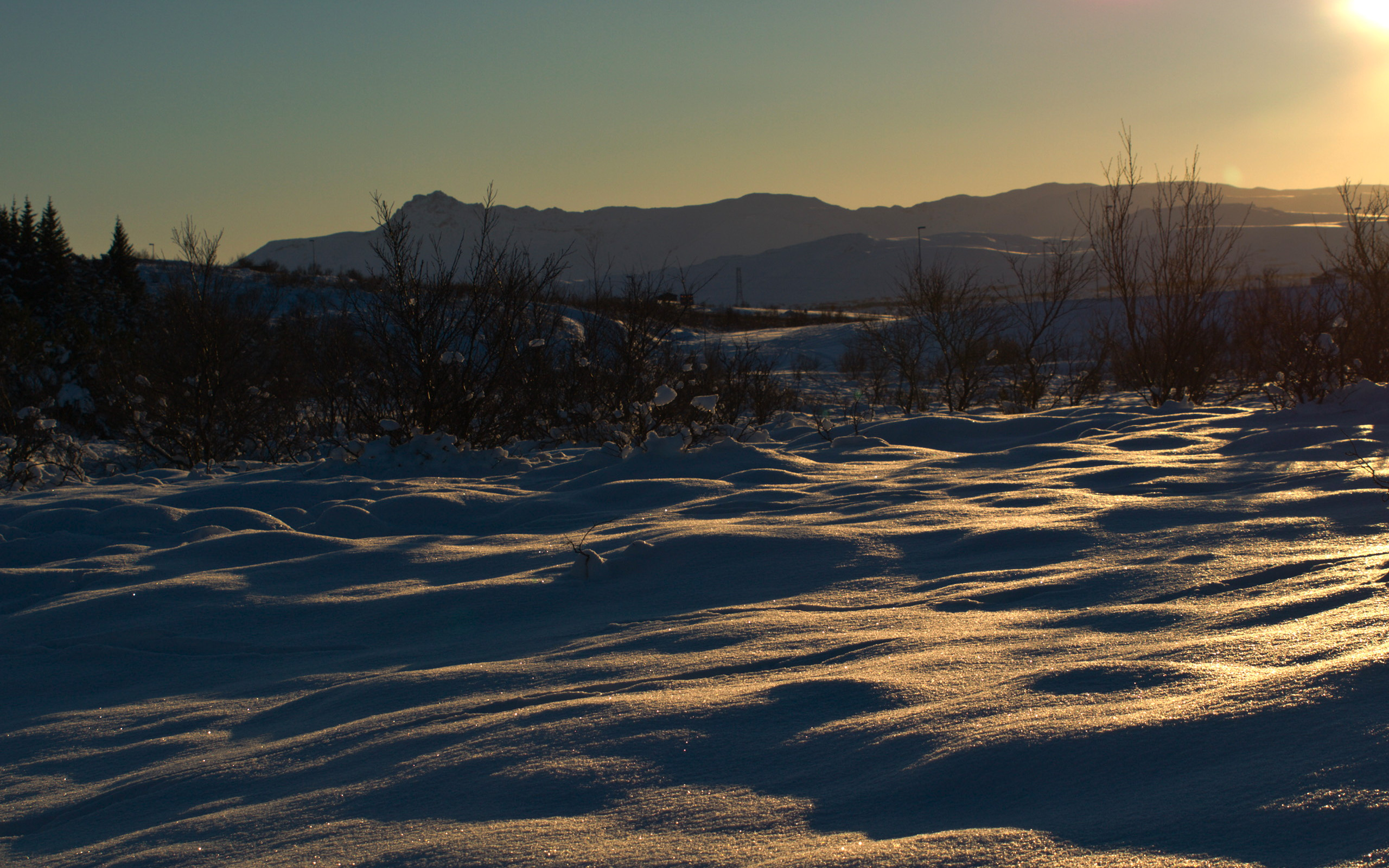
- Rauðavatn

- Location within Iceland
- Coordinates: 64°06′27″N 21°46′16″W
- Surface area: 0.32 km^{2} (0.12 sq mi)
- Average depth: 1.0 m (3 ft 3 in) (mean)
- Max. depth: 1.4 m (4 ft 7 in)

Lake Rauðavatn is a lake on the eastern side of Reykjavík, north of Elliðavatn. The Route 1 ring road passes the lake to the west, separating it from the suburb of Árbær.

In Iceland the name also describes a Lake Rauðavatn in Langanesbyggð and a wetland area near the mouth of the west bank of the river Þjórsá.

== See also ==
- List of lakes of Iceland
