= Rauðhólar (Reykjavík) =

Coordinates: 64.0954°N 21.7559°W

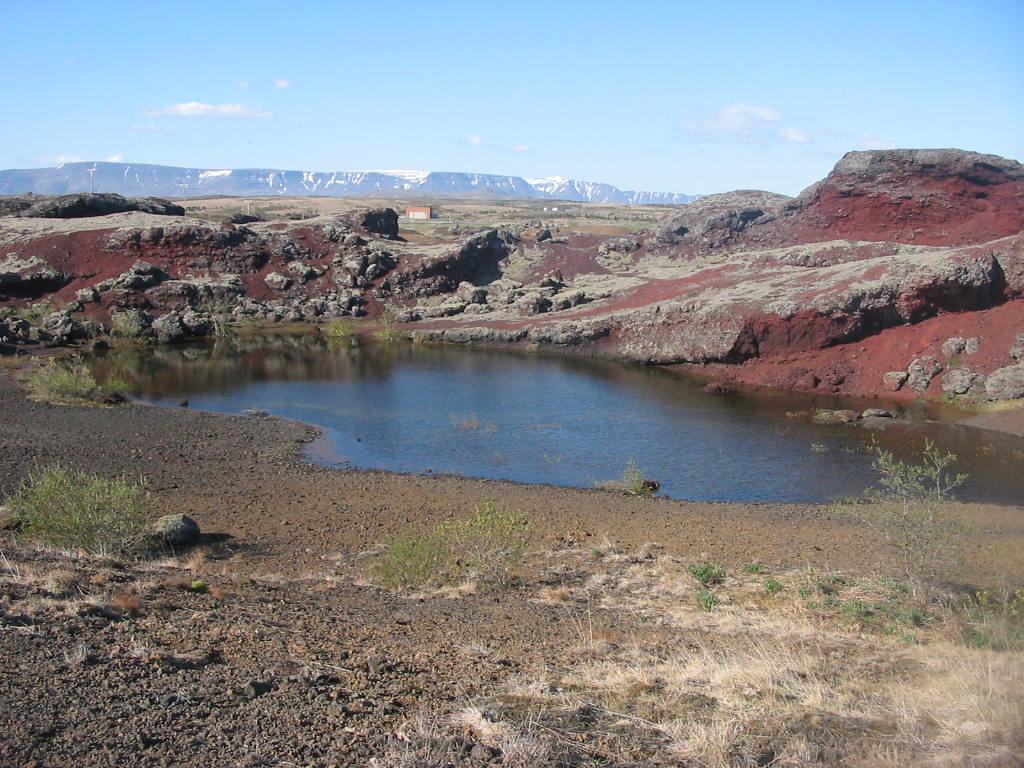
Esja behind one of the quarried cones

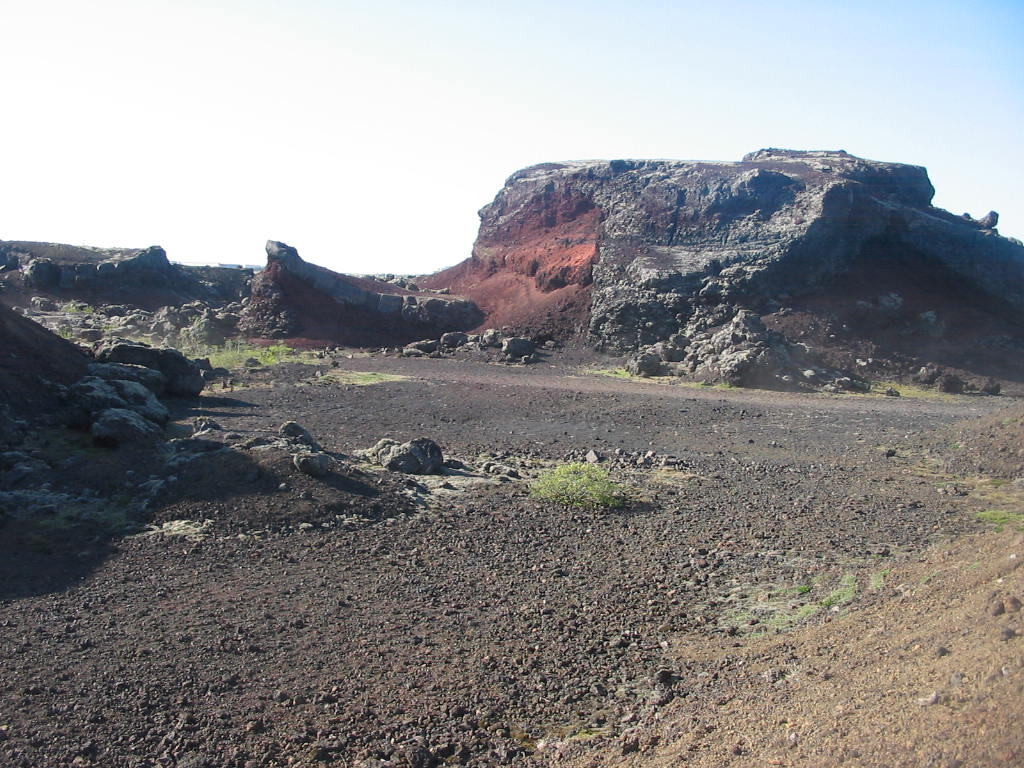
Outcrops at the Rauðhólar

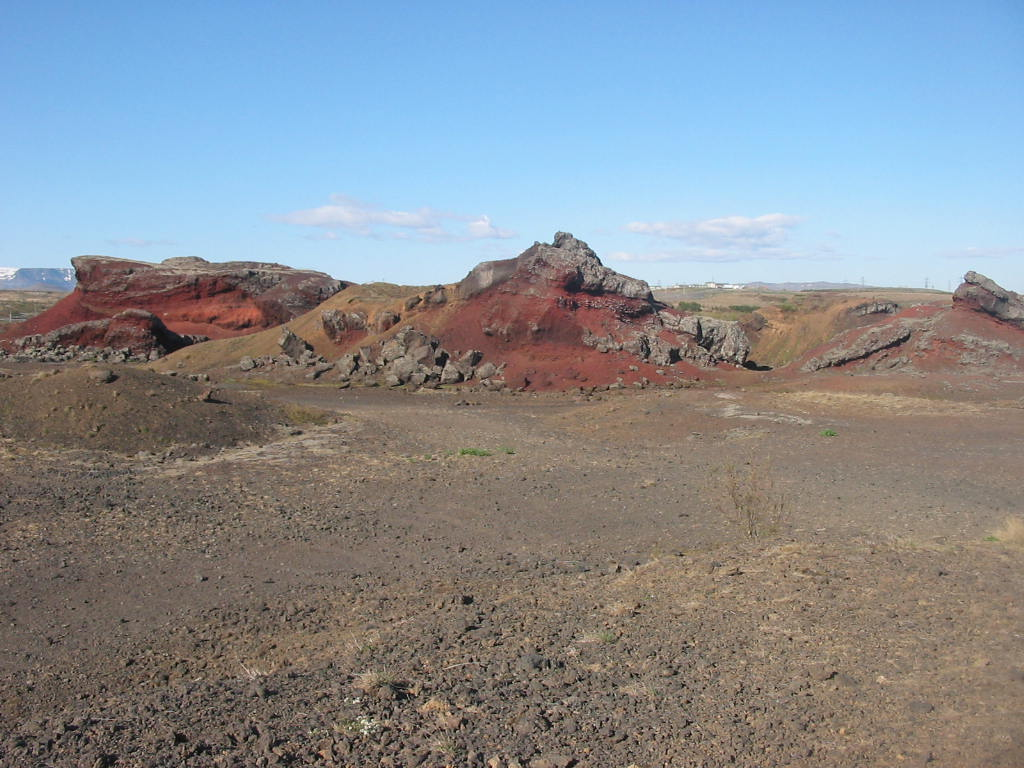
Rauðhólar

The Rauðhólar (Icelandic pronunciation: [ˈrœyðˌhouːlar̥]) are remnants of a cluster of rootless cones in Elliðaárhraun [ˈɛtlɪːðaˌaur̥ˌr̥œyːn] lava fields on the south-eastern outskirts of Reykjavík, Iceland next to the South Iceland part of Hringvegur, the Suðurlandsvegur.

== Name ==
The name Rauðhólar means “Red Mounds”. It refers to the reddish color of their rocks due to iron oxidations.

Some other volcanic cone groups in Iceland also bear the name of Rauðhólar (see e.g. Rauðhólar (Vesturdalur)).

== Geography ==
The cone group is situated not far from Reykjavík's district of Norðlingaholt [ˈnɔ(r)tliŋkaˌhɔl̥t] and between the Hringvegur and the lake Elliðavatn. Sometimes the rootless cone group is also called Rauðhólar við/near Elliðavatn.

The cones are placed directly over the connected lava flow, in this case the Elliðaárhraun, which has a width of about 2 km (1.2 mi) and a length of about 27 km (17 mi). Scientists to the beginning of the 20th century counted 150 cones.“The largest cone of the group had a width of 212 m and rose 22 m above the surrounding lava surface.”.

== Geology ==
These rootless cones, also called pseudocraters, are part of the Leitahraun lava, lava flows from a shield volcano up on Hellisheiði. This shield volcano, Leitin, is part of the Brennisteinsfjöll volcanic system. A branch of the Leitahraun lava flow, is called Elliðaárhraun and was emitted by the shield volcano about 5000 years ago.

The Rauðhólar built up on a location where lava flows entered and covered a small lake just north of today's Elliðavatn.

The stratigraphy shows a mudstone bed (the lake bottom before-eruption), a 7 m (23 ft) high lava flow and a 5 m (16 ft) high scoria platform.

=== Formation of the rootless cones ===
"When lava flows over shallow lakes, marshland or in river channels pseudocraters are formed." The heat of the lava causes expansion and boiling, the water content is changed into steam and this initiates hydromagmatic explosions “This often leads to the formation of very regularly shaped scoria craters“. The cones are fed laterally, from feeders which actually are lava tubes of advancing pāhoehoe flows.

In this way, these craters have no direct connection with a magma reservoir in the Earth's crust, thence the denomination as rootless cones.

The internal stratigraphy of the cones shows the different phases of the eruption: “They are typically stratified (formed by multiple eruptive events), inversely size graded (showing decreasing explosivity with time), and capped with welded spatter (indicating cessation of explosivity due to volatile depletion).” Some cones have more than one crater.

=== Grouping of the rootless cones ===
They are arranged in irregular groups which are not believed to be random. Most of the craters are in lines or groups, and are found at a short distance of the next crater, and may overlap. This may be due to “the underlying lava pathway geometry and/or by the substrate hydrology”, i.e. the form of the lava pathway it the water content of the sediments below the lava when it erupted.

=== Other rootless cone groups in Iceland ===
Rootless cone groups are common in Iceland. Other well known rootless cone groups in Iceland are the Landbrotshólar in the Eldgjáhraun lava field near Kirkjubæjarklaustur, the Álftaversgígar on Mýrdalssandur and the Skútustaðagígar at lake Mývatn in North Iceland.

The phenomenon is rarely found elsewhere on Earth, than Iceland. Scientists have identified potentially similar geological structures on Mars, and if confirmed they could be a sign of the existence of water at the time of eruptions on that planet.

== Quarry ==
Originally there were over 100 craters, but the gravel from them was taken and used for construction. Most of the material was removed around World War II and used for projects such as Reykjavík Airport and road building.

== Nature protection ==
Today, Rauðhólar are protected as part of Reykjavík's nature reserve of Heiðmörk.

== See also ==
- Heiðmörk
- Elliðavatn
- Rauðhólar (Vesturdalur)

== Sources ==
- Big Map of Reykjavik. 2007 - 2008 / Iceland Road Atlas.
