= Littoral cone =

Type of volcanic cone

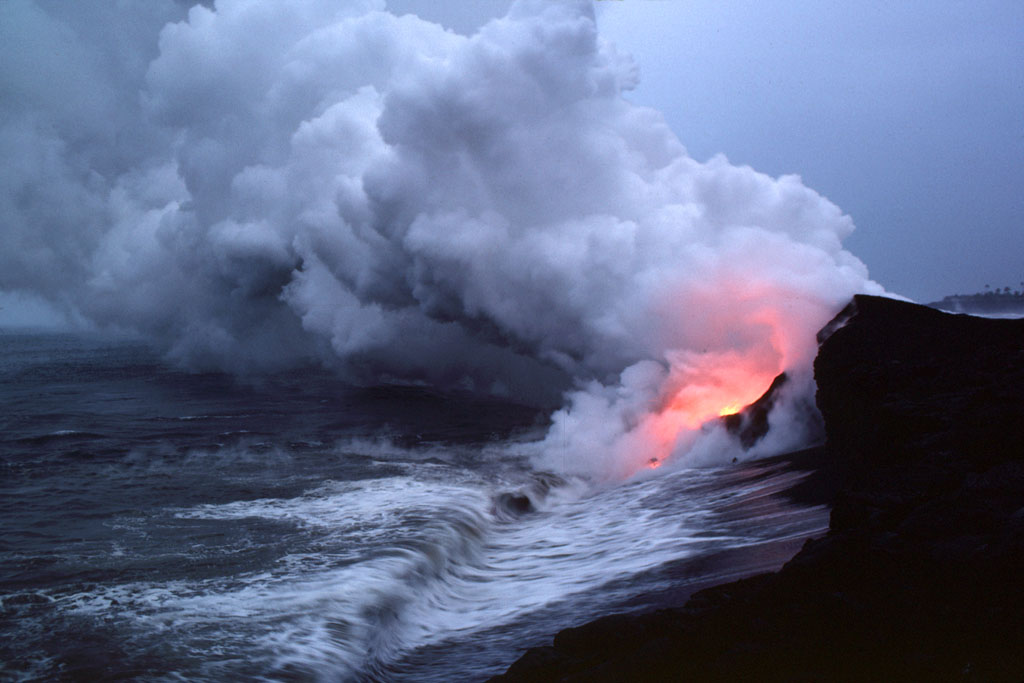
A littoral cone lies on the right, on top of the cliffs

A littoral cone is a type of volcanic cone formed from the interaction between lava flows and water. Steam explosions fragments the lava and the fragments can pile up and form a cone. Such cones usually form on ʻaʻā lava flows, and typically are formed only by large lava flows. They have been found on Hawaii and elsewhere.

== Description ==
Littoral cones are semicircular cones which are breached in the direction of the lava flow that created them. They are formed by mounds of clasts that appear like cones without a crater. Littoral cones are constructed by volcanic ash, lava bombs and lapilli. Their component material is usually poorly sorted and can feature agglutinated structures and layering. Sometimes spatter-fed lava flows occur on such cones. They are formed by degassed hyaloclastite. The most common form found on Hawaiʻi involves two semicircles on both sides of the lava flow that generated them; some such cones in Hawaiʻi form a complete rim with diameters of 200–400 metres (660–1,310 ft). Puʻu Kī in Hawaiʻi has nested craters on top of a lava tube. Typically such cones are not larger than 800 metres (2,600 ft) wide and 75 metres (246 ft) high. Other smaller cones in Hawaii have diameters of 40 metres (130 ft) and heights reaching 15 metres (49 ft). They are not as well known as the Icelandic pseudocraters.

Littoral cones not primary volcanic vents and distinguishing between a littoral cone and a primary vent can be difficult. A littoral cone forms when lava flows from land into water. Interaction between the water and the lava leads to steam explosions. These explosions throw lava fragments into the air; under favourable circumstances these fragments pile up on land and form a cone. This activity may resemble that of fire fountaining, and produces tephra columns, lava bubbles, steam blasts and lava fountains. Repeated phases of magma-water mixing lead to the formation of bedded deposits. The steam explosions can lead to the formation of Pele's hair and can constitute a hazard to people close to the ocean entry. There are two types of such cones, depending on whether the magma-water mixing was free or whether it occurred in an enclosed environment; the former produces typical phreatomagmatic deposits, the latter more ash-poor cones than the former.

The forming lava flows need to be sufficiently large; the minimum size of lava flows that have formed such cones in Hawaiʻi is 38,000,000 cubic metres (50,000,000 yd^{3}). Of these, about 5-6% of their volume is converted to fragments. Usually littoral cones are formed by ʻaʻā lava as their fragmented nature allows ideal water-lava interactions, but pāhoehoe and intermediary lavas can also form littoral cones. Other properties such as the speed of the lava flow and the structure of the flow front also influence the formation of littoral cones. Larger lava flow rates generate larger cones. In some littoral cones in Hawaiʻi that were formed by pāhoehoe lava flows, the collapse of a lava bench and subsequent steam explosions formed the cones instead. Pyroclastic flows can also form littoral cones, one such cone has been found on Lombok and formed during the 1257 Samalas eruption.

== Examples ==
Pseudocraters and littoral cones have been found on Iceland, Hawaiʻi, Cerro Azul in the Galápagos Islands, Deception Island, Antarctica, Réunion and Medicine Lake Volcano, California. Sometimes the words "pseudocrater" and "littoral cone" are used as synonyms. Littoral cones are usually quickly removed by lava flow burial or sea erosion; thus littoral cones rarely survive as landscape features.

Prehistorical littoral cones have been found on the coast of Hawaiʻi, where the volcanoes Mauna Loa and Kīlauea face the sea. They were named "littoral cones" by Wentworth in 1938. About 50 large cones are found on these two volcanoes and only three of them were formed during historical times; no such cones have been found on the other Hawaiian volcanoes. The Puʻu ʻŌʻō and Mauna Ulu eruptions of Kīlauea have also formed small littoral cones.

Examples of littoral cones include one formed at Piton de la Fournaise on Reunion in 2007, Sand Hills (1840 eruption) on Kīlauea in Hawaiʻi, ʻAuʻau, Nā Puʻu a Pele, Puʻu Hou (1868 eruption) and Puʻu Kī (eruption 1300 years ago) at Mauna Loa in Hawaiʻi, a cone close to Villamil at Sierra Negra, Galapagos, several cones south of Krýsuvík and Eldborg (1800 years ago) at Hengill both on Iceland, a cone in the Winter Water unit of the Columbia Plateau Basalts, Oregon, several cones along the shores of Lake Kivu in East Africa, a cone at Becharof Lake, Alaska, Burilan and Devil Rock on Gaua, and Ponta de Ferraria (eruption 840 ± 60 years ago) on São Miguel Island, Azores. The Speedwell Vent in Derbyshire, United Kingdom may also be a littoral cone of Carboniferous age. Pleistocene littoral cones may also exist in Lake Tahoe, California, while Archean littoral cones may have formed in the Barberton Greenstone Belt of South Africa.
