= Raufarhólshellir =

Coordinates: 63°56′23″N 21°24′03″W

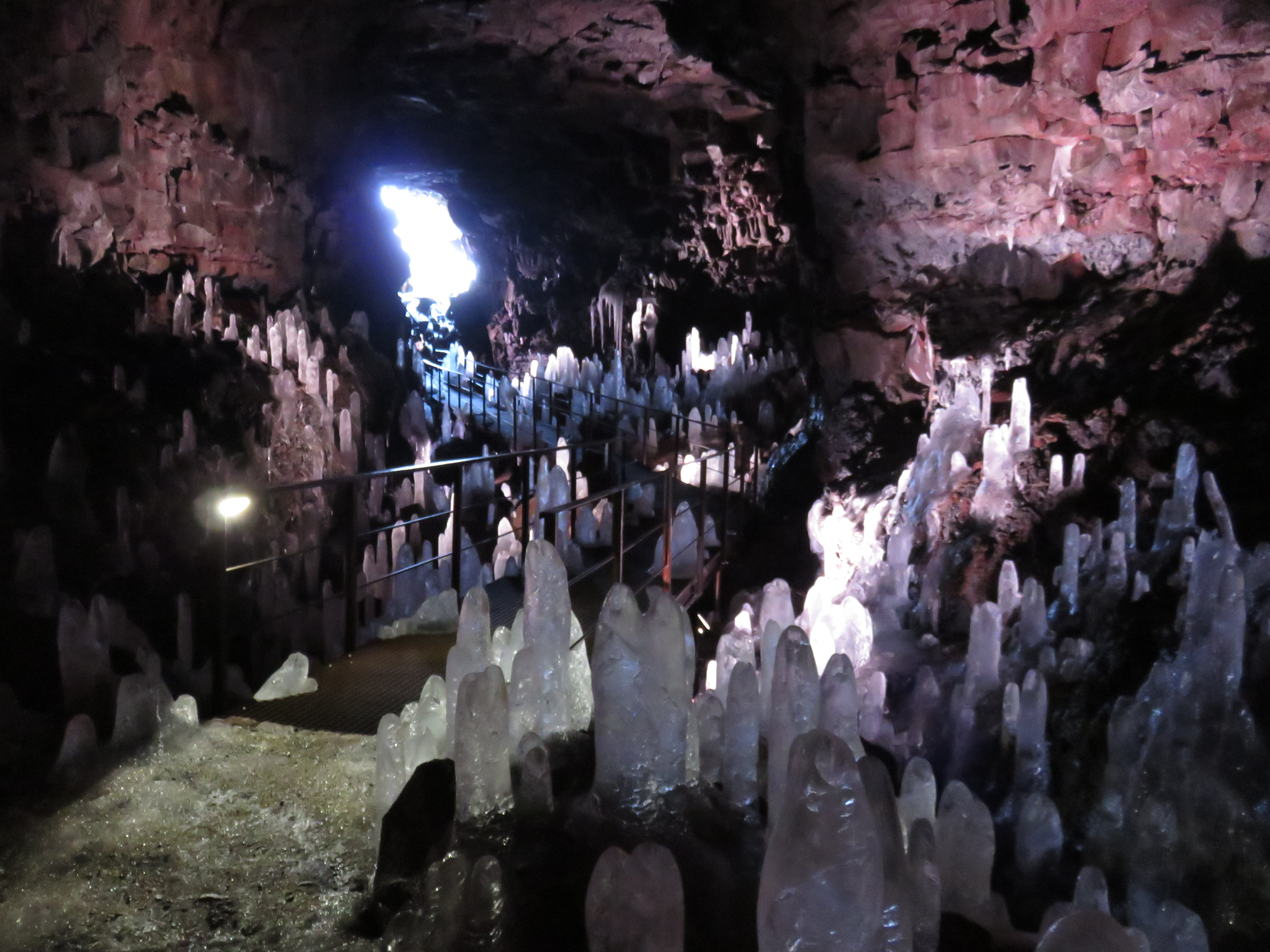
Area near the entrance of Raufarhólshellir showing ice stalagmites and part of the metal walkway

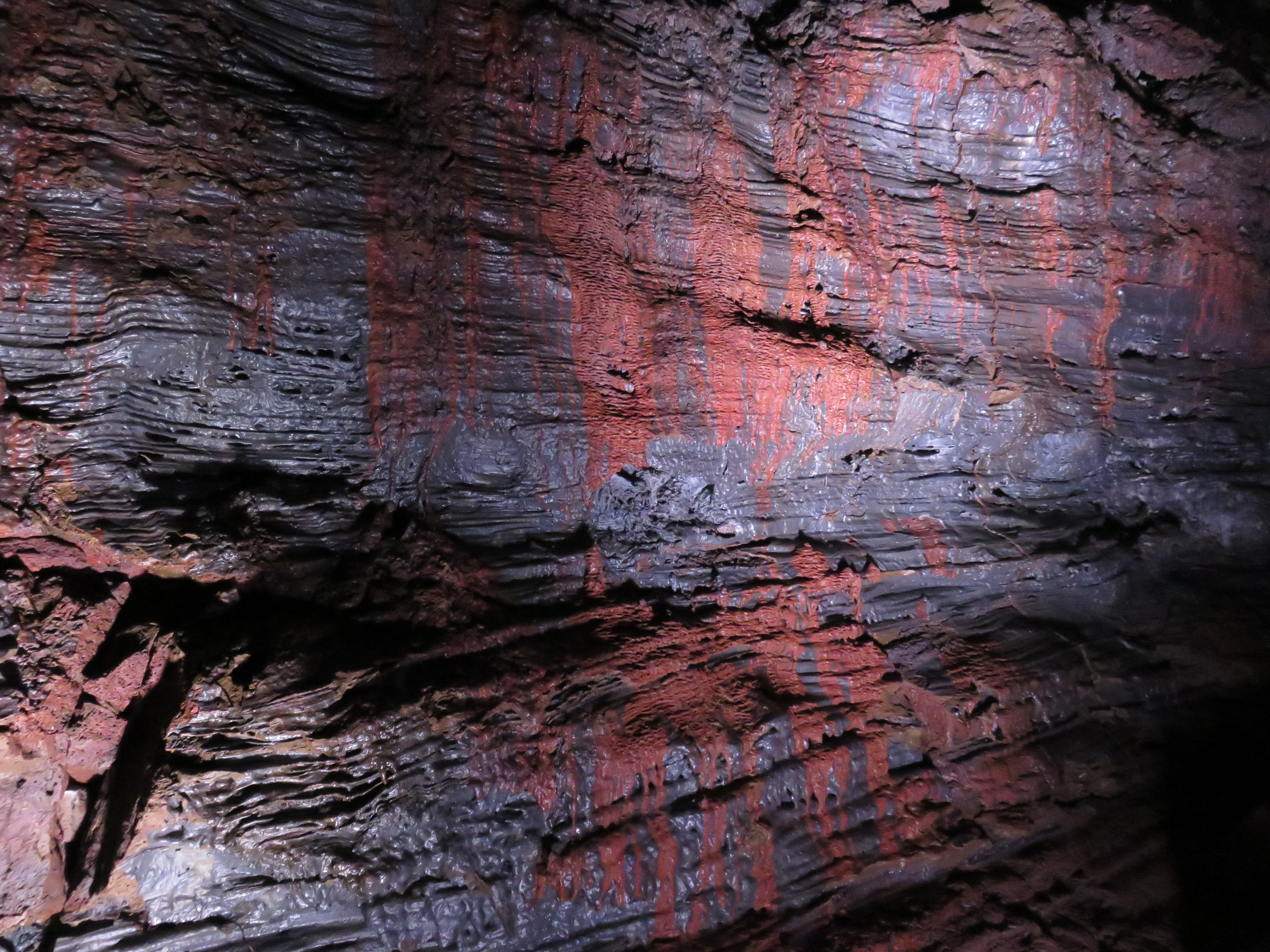
Detail of the cave wall, showing bathtub rings and red-on-black coloration

Raufarhólshellir (Icelandic pronunciation: [ˈrœyːvarˌhoulsˌhɛtlɪr̥]) is the fourth-longest lava tube in Iceland. The cave's proximity to Reykjavík made it popular with visitors, who caused damage to the cave. In late 2016 the cave was closed to the public to clear accumulated garbage and install lighting and a walkway to part of the cave. The cave reopened for guided tours the following year.

== Description ==
Raufarhólshellir is the fourth-longest lava tube in Iceland, at 1,360 metres (4,460 ft) long, with a typical height of at least 10 metres (33 ft) and width up to 30 metres (98 ft). The cave has multiple skylights, or holes in the ceiling, under which snow accumulates. Iceland Route 39 crosses over the cave at a point where it is about 15 meters in diameter. The cave hosts microbial mats containing a variety of microorganisms, including actinomycetota and acidobacteriota. The land containing the cave is owned by the Seventh-day Adventist Church and rented to a company that operates the guided tours.

== History ==
Raufarhólshellir formed 5600 years ago, based on carbon dating. The source of the lava flow that created the tube is 10 kilometres (6.2 mi) uphill from the cave and was part of the Leitahraun eruption. An expedition in 1971 by the Shepton Mallet Caving Club was one of the first systematic explorations of caves in Iceland.

Given its proximity to Reykjavík, it is popular with visitors. Over 20,000 people visited the cave in 2015. The cave was also used as a filming location for the 2014 film Noah and the series Sense8.

Prior to 2016, it was freely open to the public, but it closed late that year due to concerns with garbage accumulation, damage to the cave, and the cost of rescuing visitors. Nearly all of the fragile lava straws had been destroyed by visitors. The cave reopened in mid-2017 after a renovation in which walking decks and lighting was added to the part of the cave nearest the opening, and the removal of several metric tons of trash. The infrastructure improvements were constructed in a way so as not to damage the cave. After the renovation, the cave can only be visited by guided tour.

In June 2017, two concerts were held in the cave as part of the Secret Solstice music festival, which included a performance by Helgi Björnsson, for which only 50 tickets were available.
