= Rootless cone =

Volcanic landform

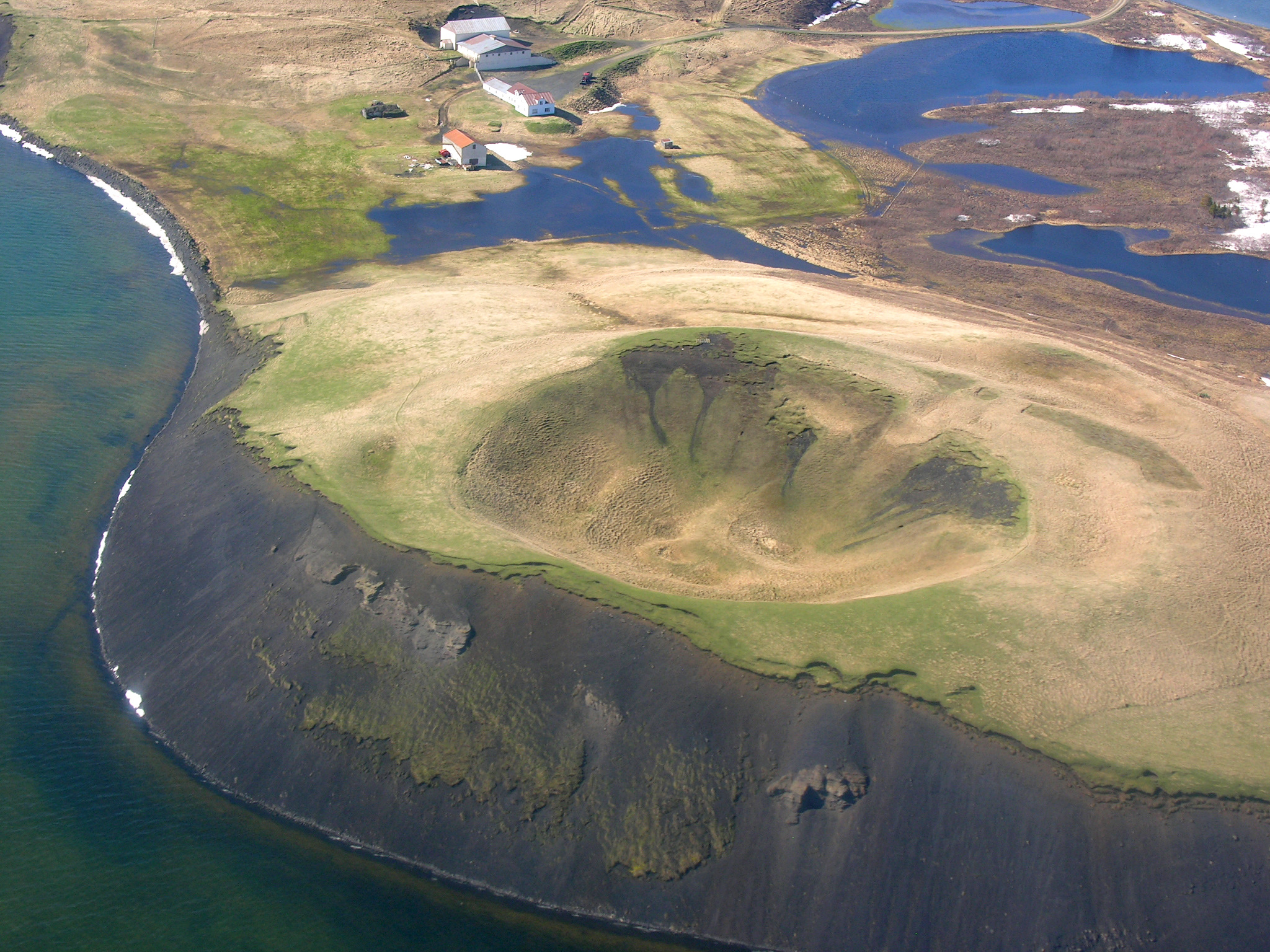
A rootless cone at Myvatn Lake, Iceland.

A rootless cone, also formerly called a pseudocrater, is a volcanic landform which resembles a true volcanic crater, but differs in that it is not an actual vent from which lava has erupted. They are characterised by the absence of any magma conduit ("root") which connects below the surface of a planet.

Rootless cones are formed by steam explosions as flowing hot lava crosses over a wet surface, such as a swamp, a lake, or a pond. The water from the wetland heats up and forms steam underneath the lava. The explosive gases eventually break through the lava surface in a manner similar to a phreatic eruption, and the tephra builds up crater-like forms which can appear very similar to real volcanic craters.

Well known examples are found in Iceland such as the craters in the lake Mývatn (Skútustaðagígar), the Rauðhólar in the region of the capital city Reykjavík or the Landbrotshólar of South-Iceland's Katla UNESCO Global Geopark near Kirkjubæjarklaustur.

Volcanologists witnessed the formation of a rootless cone for the first time in history during a steam explosion in connection with the first eruption of Eyjafjallajökull in March 2010.

== Martian rootless cones ==
Rootless cones have also been discovered in the Athabasca Valles region of Mars, where lava flowed over superheated groundwater in the underlying rocks. Many such rootless cones have been imaged by the HiRISE camera on the Mars Reconnaissance Orbiter (MRO).

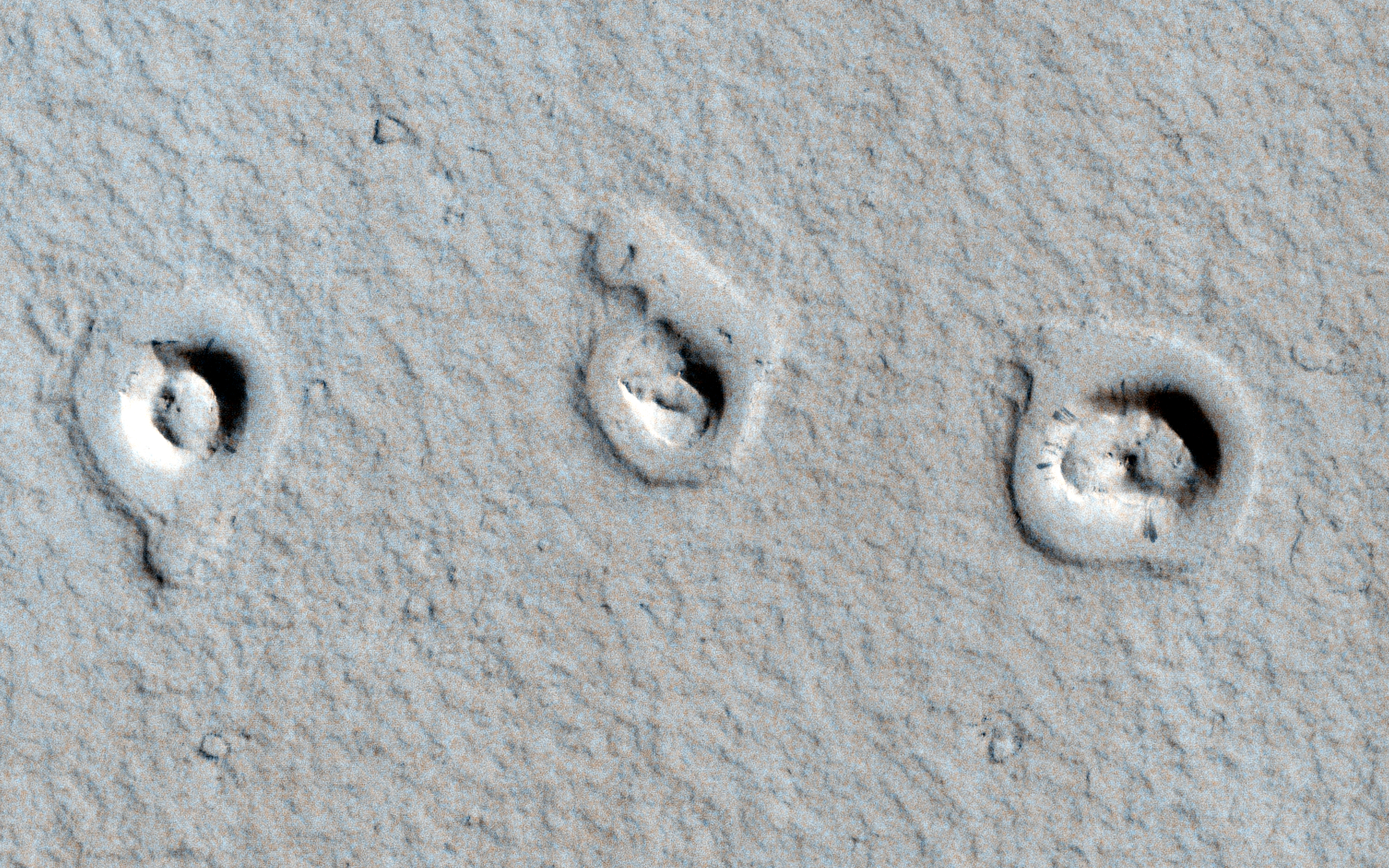
Rootless cones imaged by the MRO, January 4, 2013 (21.965°N 197.807°E).

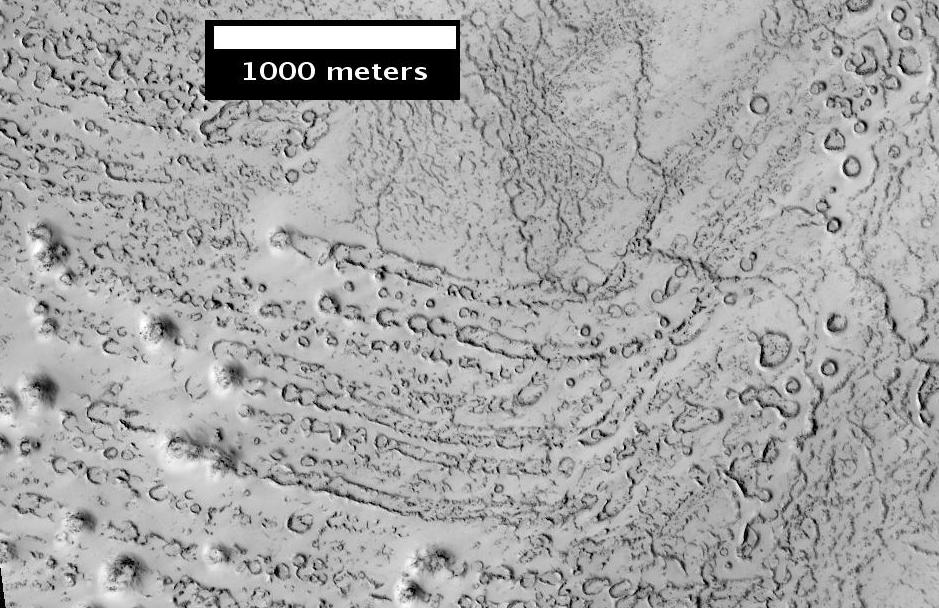
Rootless cones imaged by the MRO, January 4, 2008 (25.910°N 173.760°E)

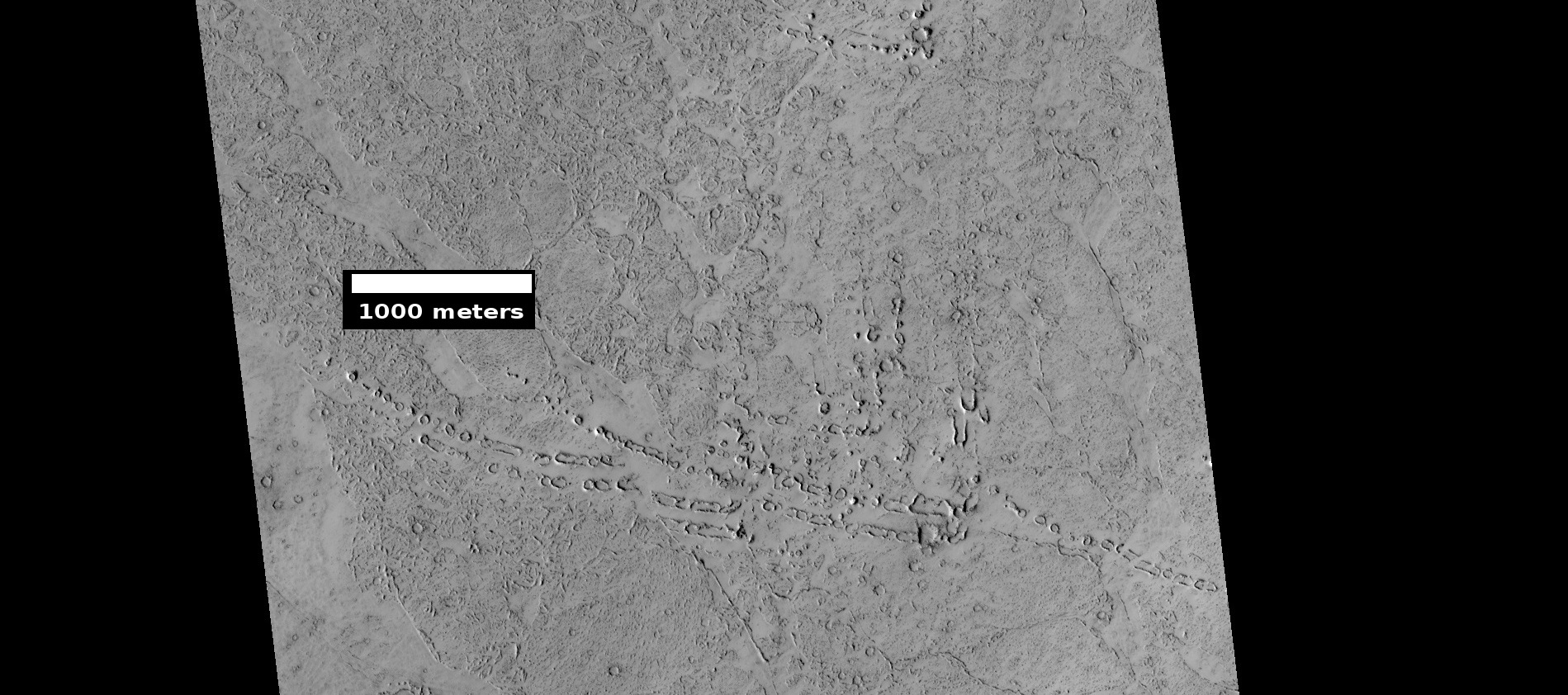
Rootless cones as seen by the HiRISE camera under HiWish program.

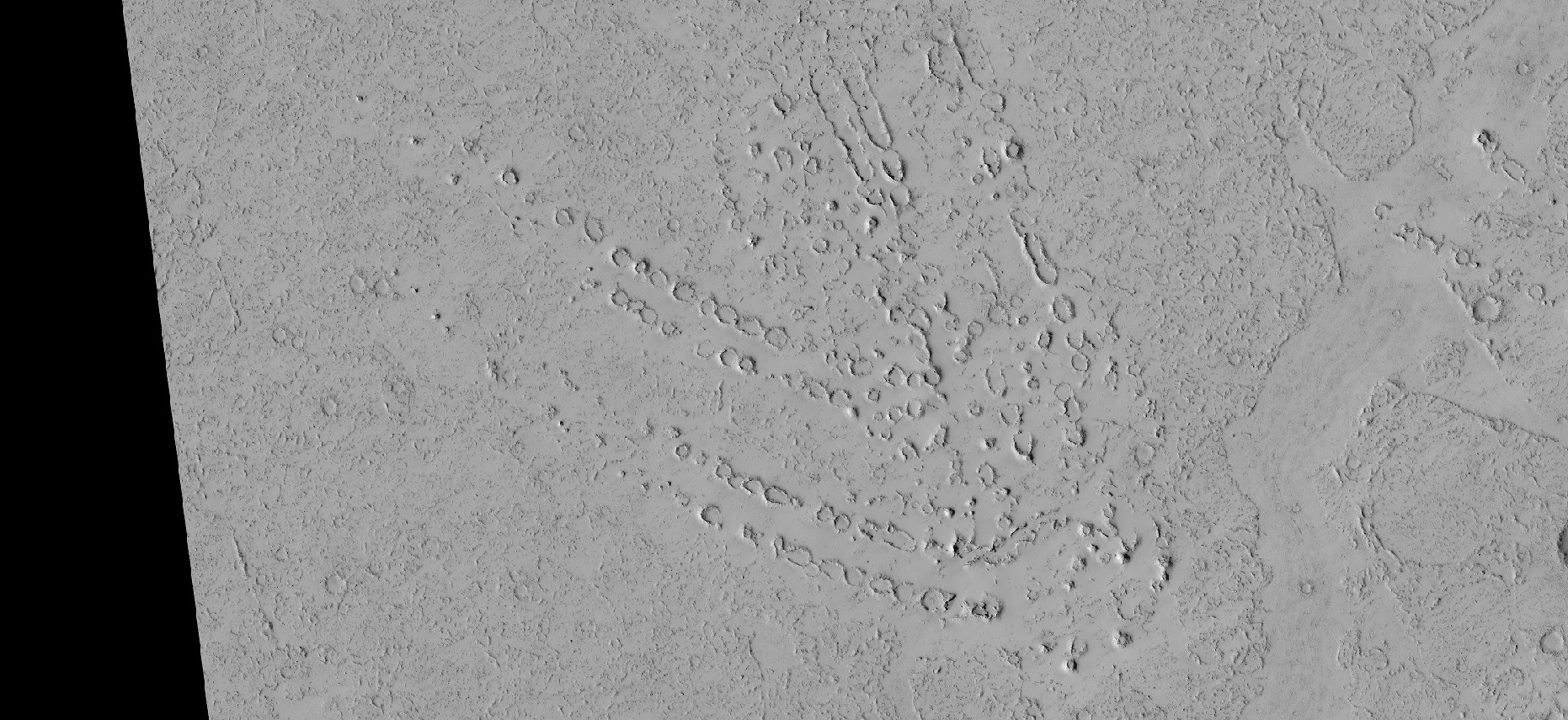
Rootless cones, as seen by HiRISE under HiWish program. Here the kink in the chain may have been caused by the lava changing direction.

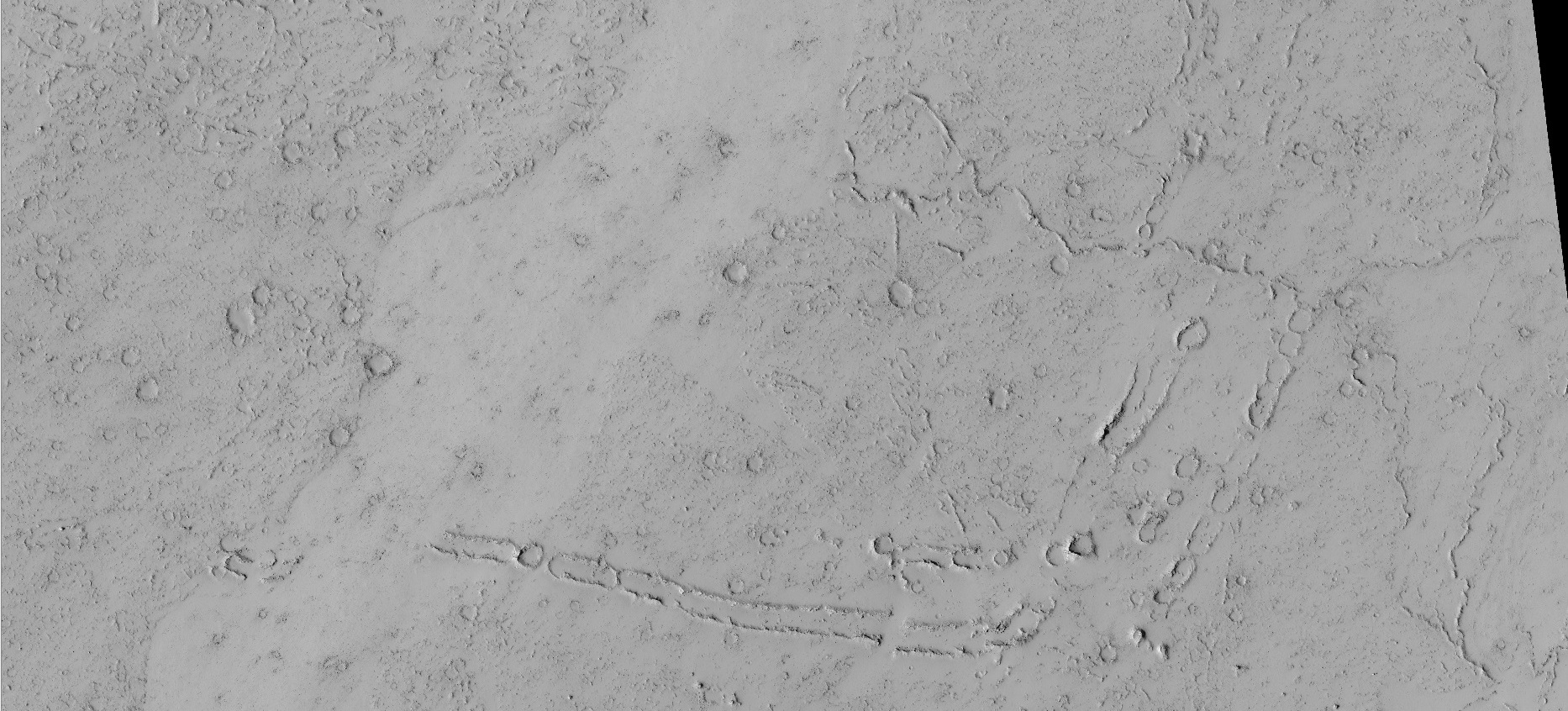
Rootless cones, as seen by HiRISE under HiWish program. Some of the forms do not have the shape of rings or cones because the lava may have moved too quickly; thereby not allowing a complete cone shape to form.

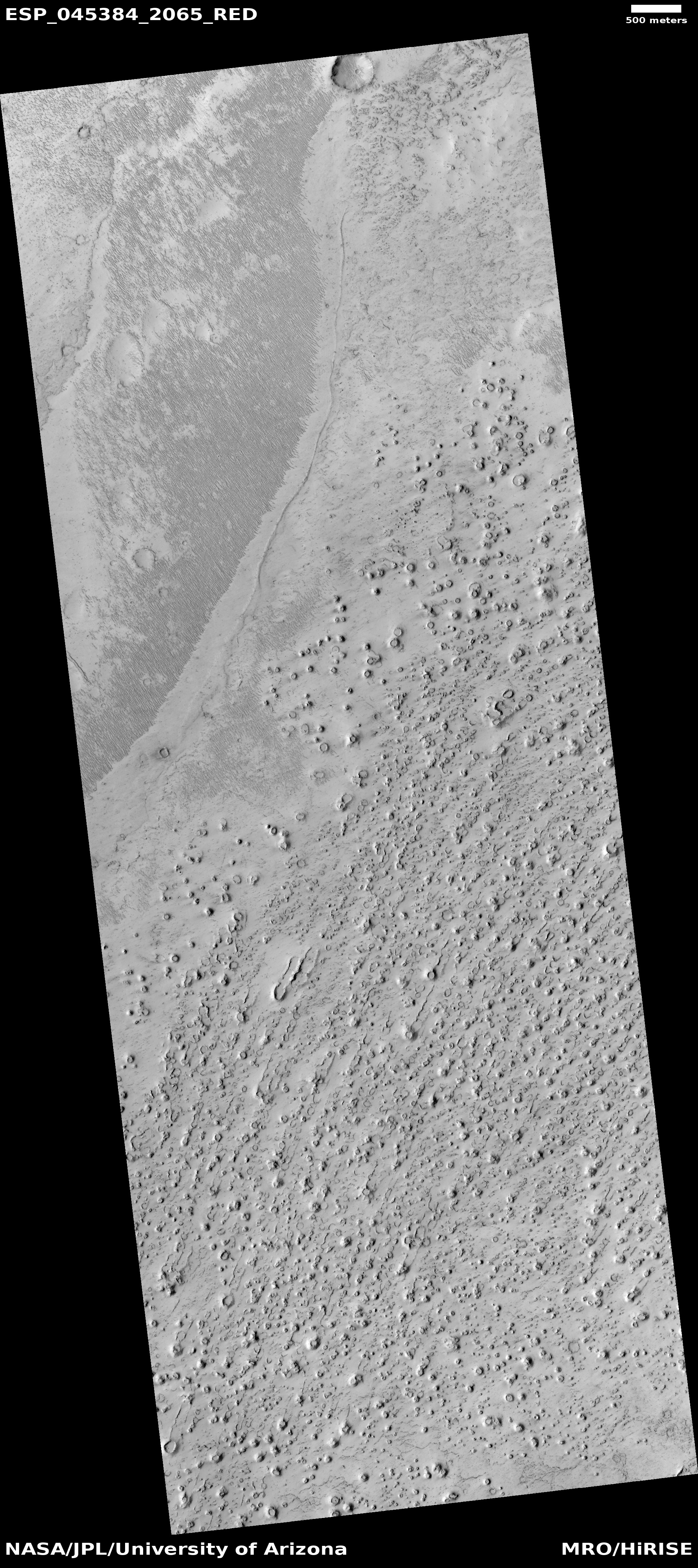
Wide view of field of rootless cones, as seen by HiRISE under HiWish program

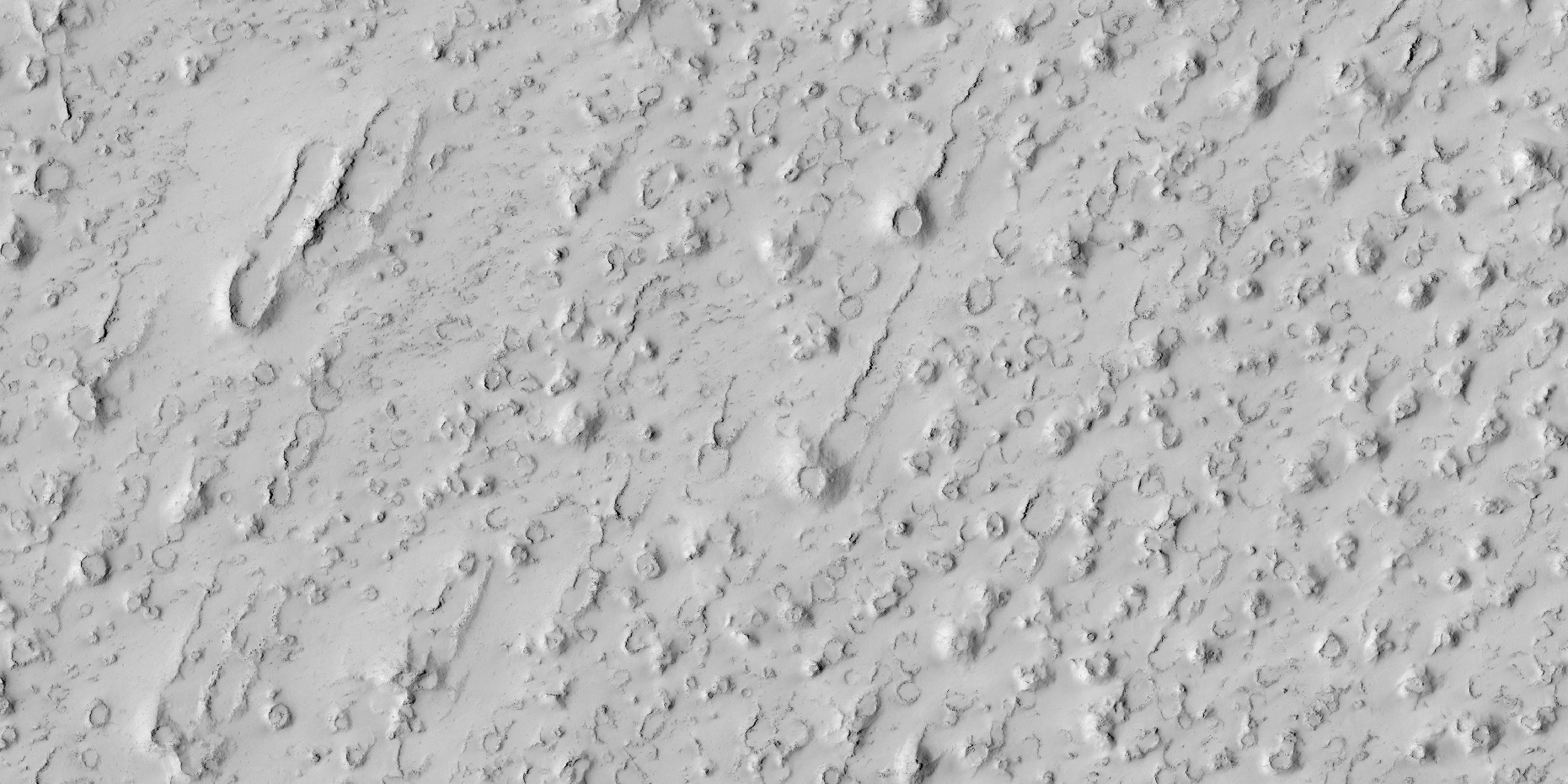
Close view of rootless cones with tails that suggest lava was moving toward the Southwest over ice-rich ground, as seen by HiRISE under HiWish program

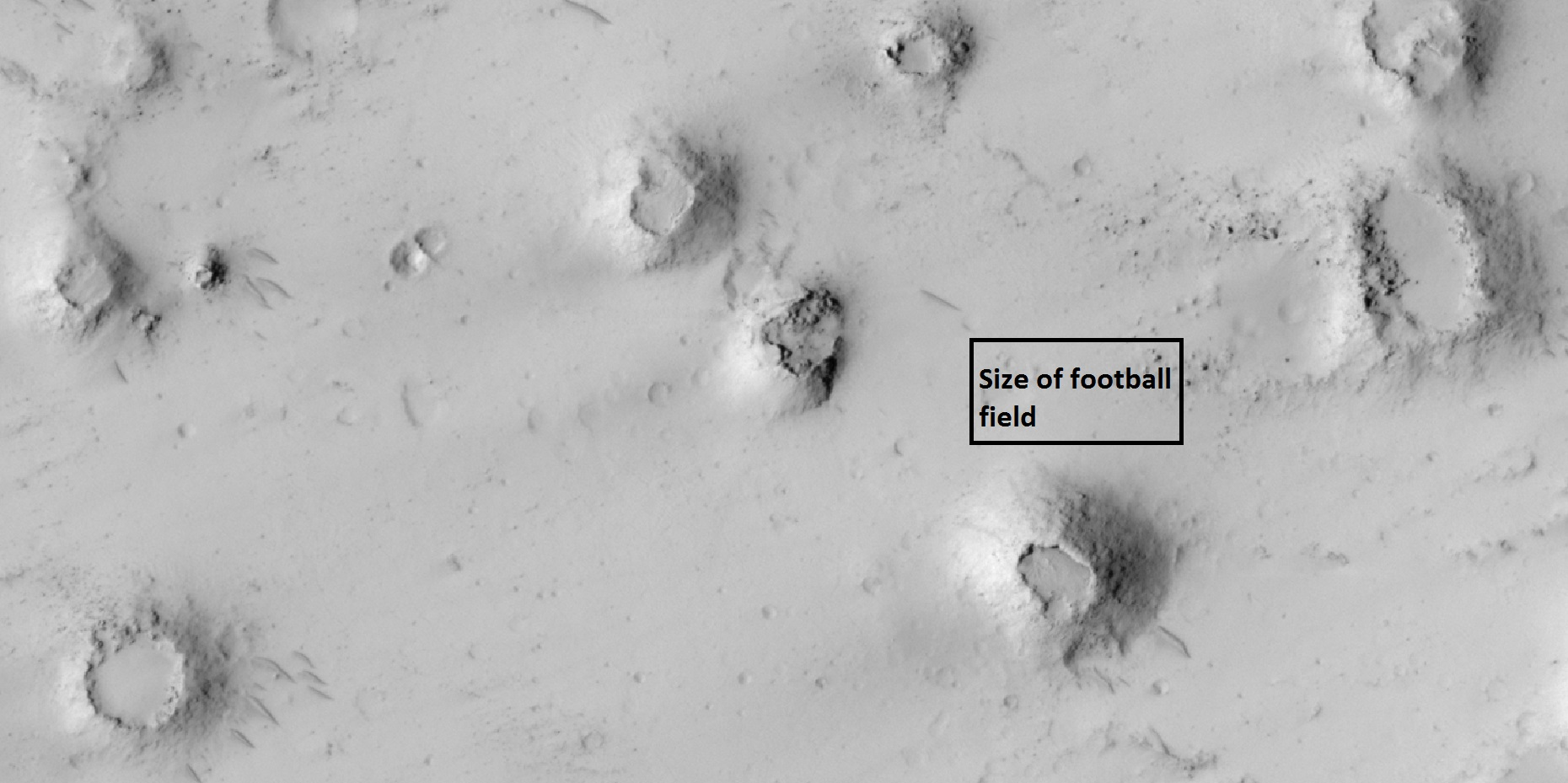
Close view of cones with the size of a football field shown, as seen by HiRISE under HiWish program

== See also ==
- Hornito
- List of rocks on Mars
- Littoral cone
- Maar
- Volcanism of Iceland
