= Rauðhólar (Vesturdalur) =

Chain of volcanoes in Iceland

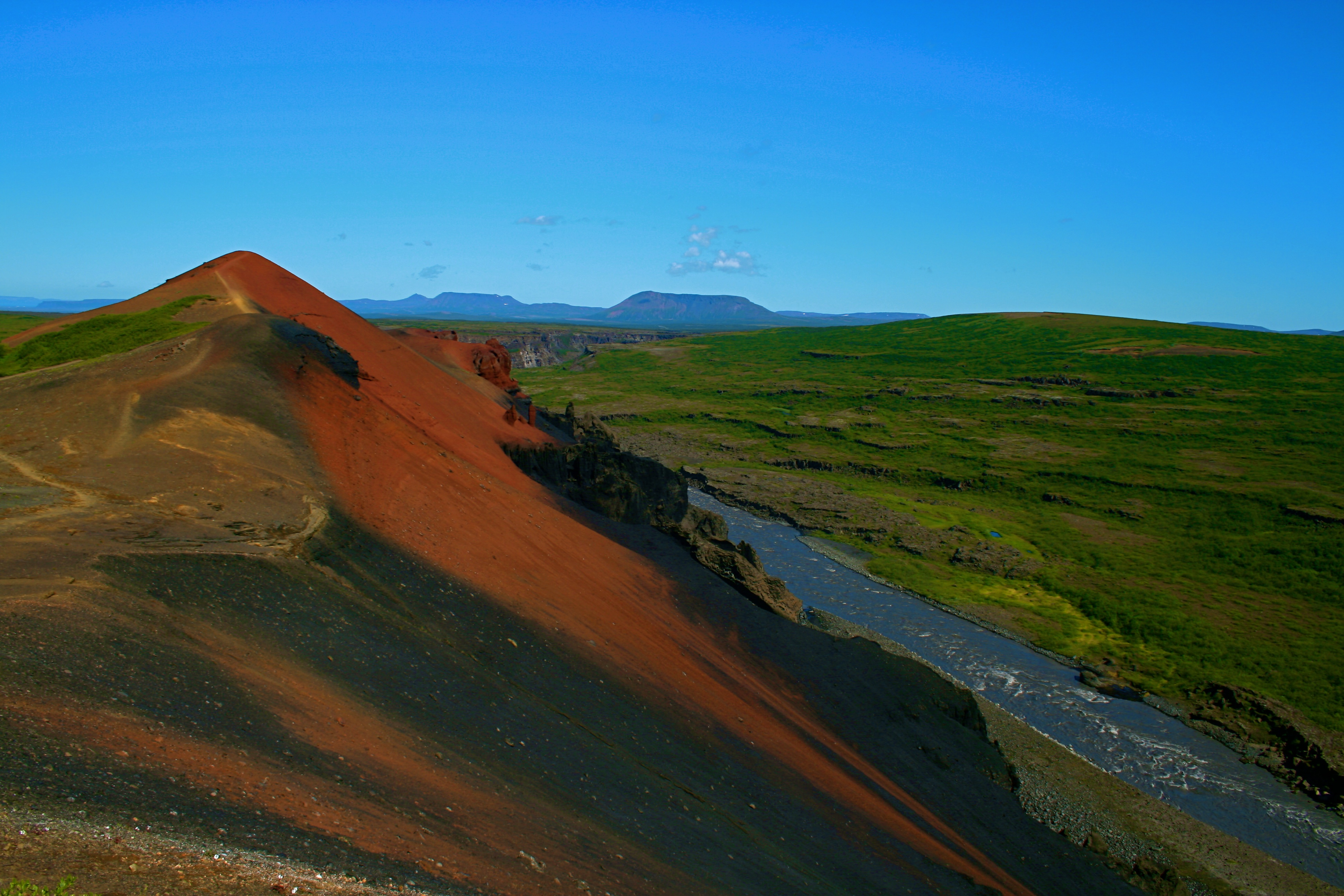
Rauðhólar (Vesturdalur)

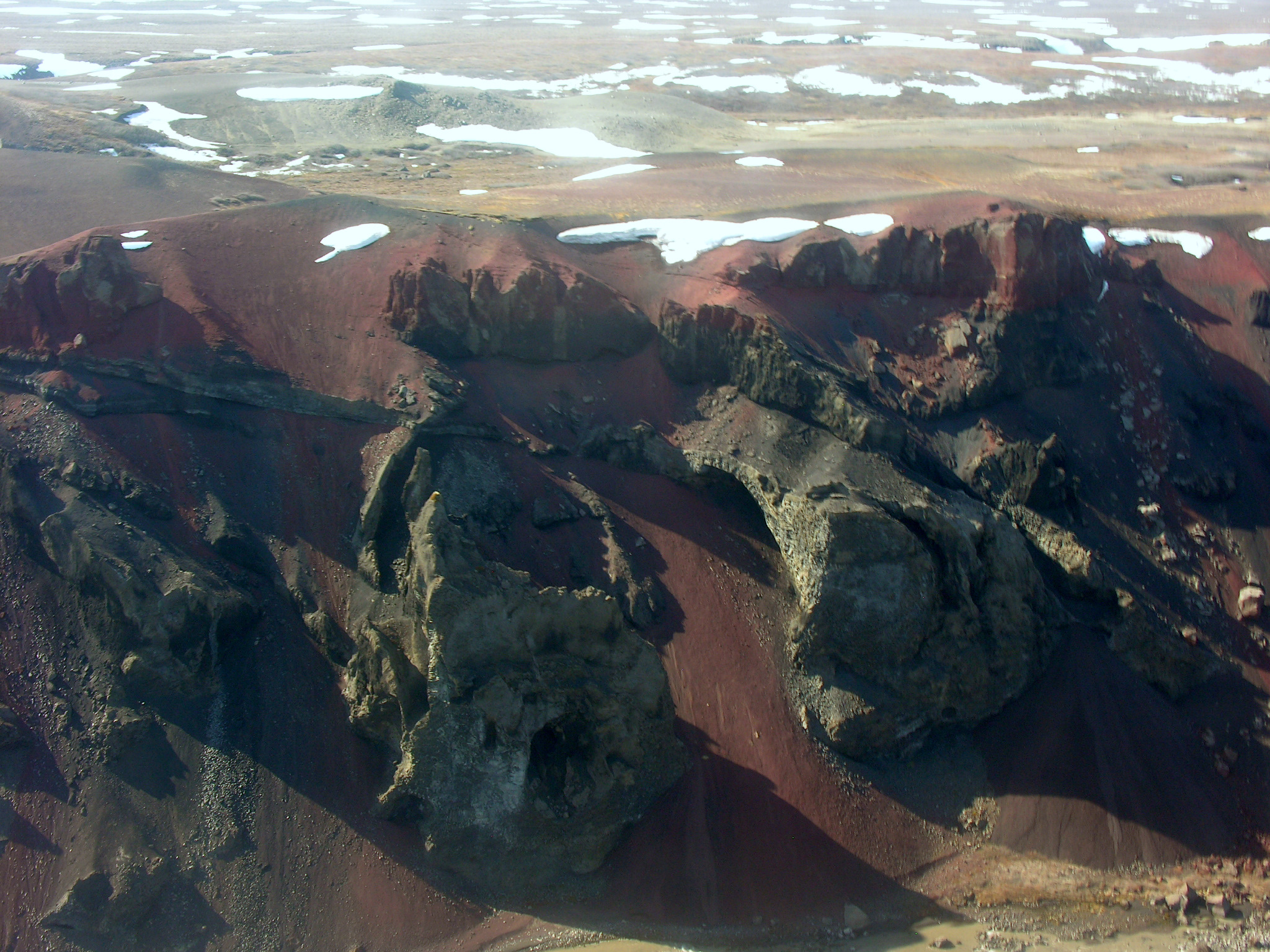
Magmatic plumbing system exposed by erosion: Rauðhólar (Vesturdalur)

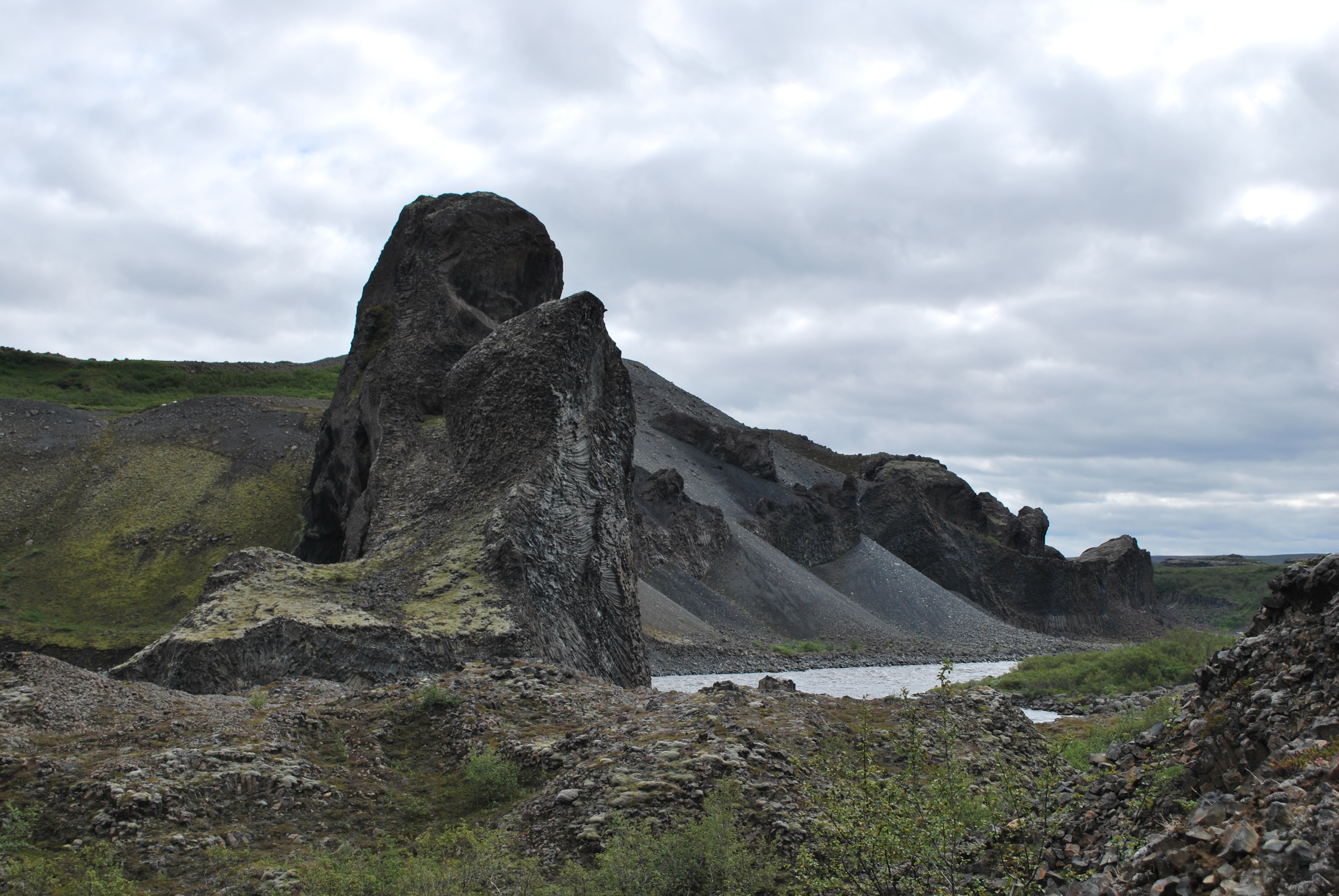
Hljóðaklettar

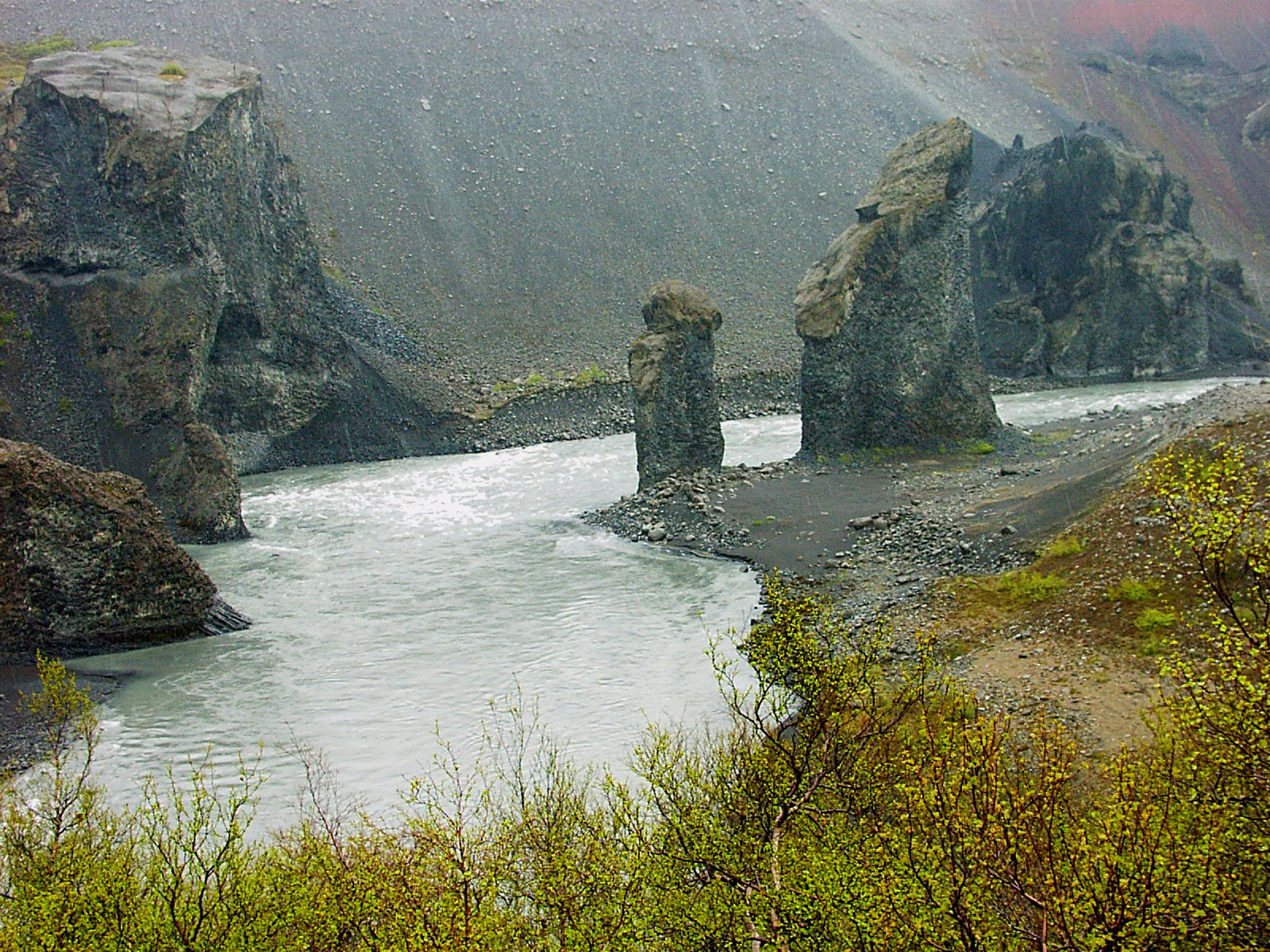
Karl og Kerling, volcanic plugs in Vesturdalur

Rauðhólar (Vesturdalur) is a small chain of volcanoes within the Askja or the Fremrinámur volcanic systems in the north of Iceland.

They are located at the lower course of the river Jökulsá á Fjöllum, around 25 km from Öxarfjörður fjord and at the same time near Vesturdalur in Jökulsárgljúfur National Park next to the Hljóðaklettar (the echo cliffs).

== Geology ==
=== Hljóðaklettar and Rauðhólar ===
The latter vents and Rauðhólar build together a small volcanic chain, consisting of eruption fissures which were active 11.000 years ago. Some of the fissures crossed the river. The river destroyed the craters of Hljóðaklettar and only remnants were left standing, dikes, volcanic plugs, sills and lava flows. The erosion started with phreatomagmatic explosions during the eruption series, when water and magma met, but there was also steady fluvial erosion afterwards, incl. many big jökulhlaup. The volcanic edifices of Rauðhólar on the other hand were just opened in the direction of the river, but left intact.

=== Jökulhlaups of Jökulsá á Fjöllum ===
Scientists are still discussing the exact data of the Holocene volcanogenic jökulhlaups of Jökulsá á Fjöllum, but it is possible to show the sedimentary record of no less than 16 jökulhlaups in Vesturdalur.

=== Magmatic plumbing system ===
The magmatic plumbing system of Rauðhólar was exposed by erosion, so that a.o. the feeder dike can be seen and analyzed whereby the geologist A. Gudmundsson saw a connection between the dike and a normal fault (re)activated by the dike movements. as this is still a location on the active Icelandic rift zone. Other scientists refer to the type of volcanoes as scoria cones which in this case expose a rather complicated plumbing system connected to repeated intrusions.

== Visitor attraction ==
The region with its very unusual rock formations is also a visitor attraction with many hiking trails, a camping area nearby and some simple facilities. The road has newly been upgraded (in 2020).

The Vesturdalur valley and its rock formations are part of Jökulsárgljúfur National Park, today integrated in the bigger Vatnajökull National Park.

== External sources ==
- Friese, N., Bense, F.A., Tanner, D.C. et al. From feeder dykes to scoria cones: the tectonically controlled plumbing system of the Rauðhólar volcanic chain, Northern Volcanic Zone, Iceland. Bull Volcanol 75, 717 (2013). https://doi.org/10.1007/s00445-013-0717-2
