= Elliðaár =

River in Iceland

Coordinates: 64°07′18″N 21°50′27″W

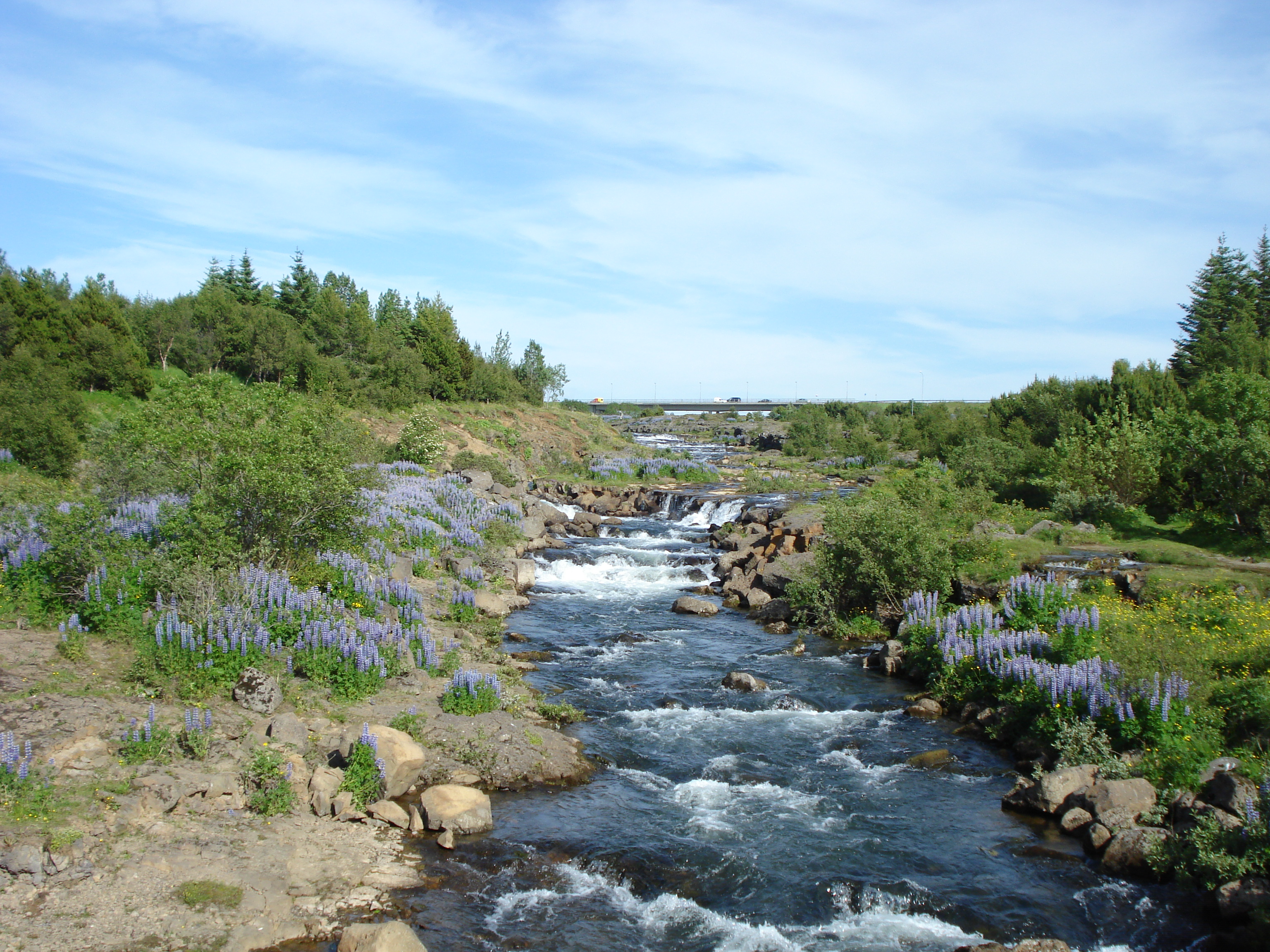
Elliðaá River, Reykjavík, Iceland

The rivers Elliðaár (Icelandic pronunciation: [ˈɛtlɪːðaˌauːr̥], "Elliði's rivers") are situated in the Reykjavík area in the south-west of Iceland. Two small rivers have their source in the volcanic mountain range of Bláfjöll and stream down to Elliðavatn lake at the eastern suburban border of the city, its outlet forming the river. On their way, they pass through the nature reserve area of Heiðmörk.

On its way to the sea, which is reached in the Elliðavogur bay in Reykjavík, not far from the open-air folk museum of Árbæjarsafn in Árbær, the river cascades over several small waterfalls, within the boundary of the city.

The river is an excellent place to fish salmon.

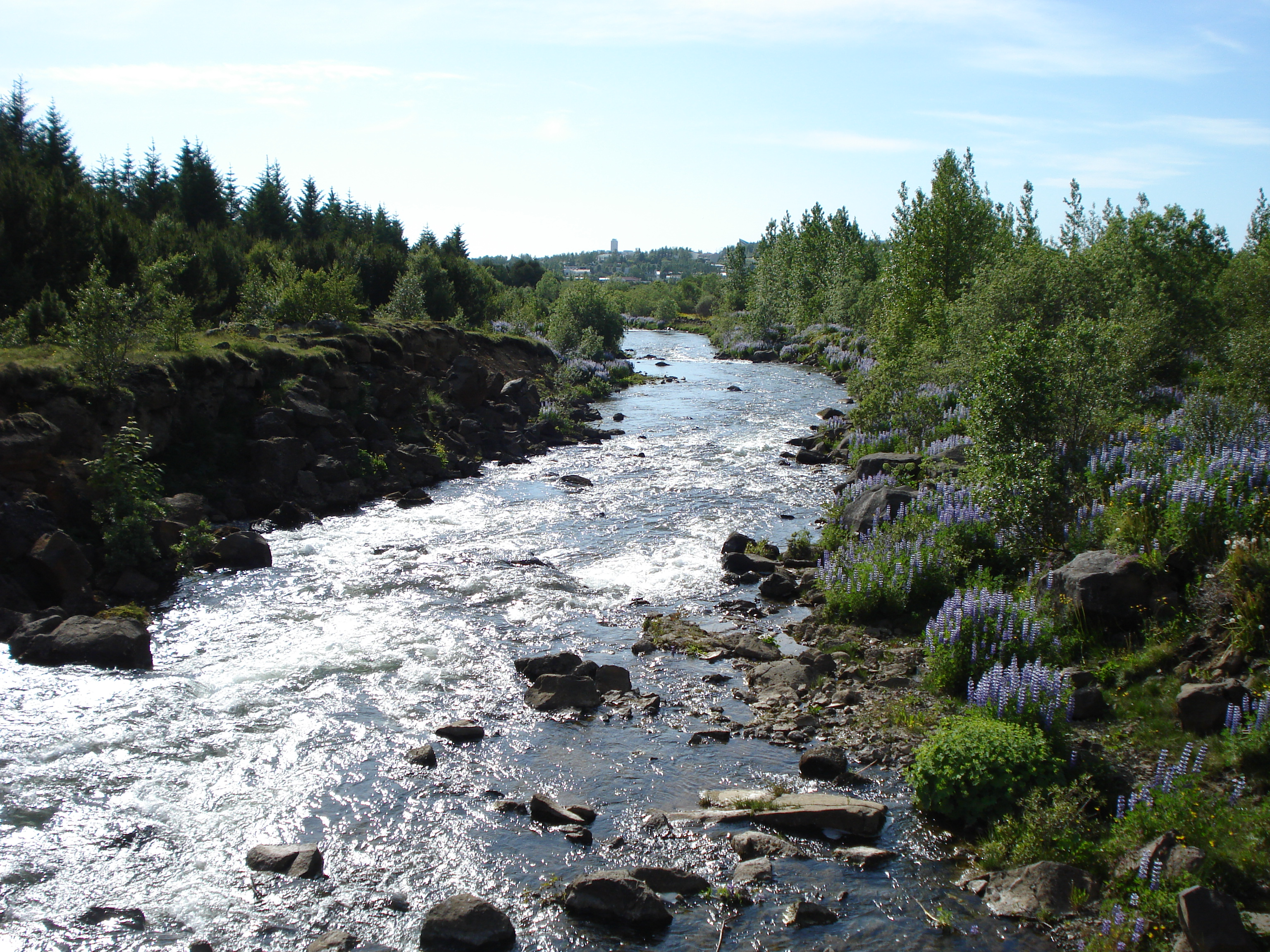
Another view of the Elliðaá near Reykjavík.

== The valley ==
The valley Elliðaárdalur [ˈɛtlɪːðaˌaurˌtaːlʏr̥] is one of the green recreational areas of Reykjavík with hiking and bicycle paths. There is also a swimming pool, a small ski lift and horse riding facilities in the valley. Since the beginning of the 20th century, this has been a reforestation area with birch, fir and pine trees planted.

Very interesting and varied bird life is found in the valley including swans and 8 different species of ducks. All together, 60 species of birds can be found here. Many song birds such as that of the thrush can be heard.

In 1921, the second hydroelectric power station in Iceland was constructed here and is still in use, the first being situated in the nearby town of Hafnarfjörður. A museum in the power station tells the story of the electrification of Reykjavík.

The base of the valley is a lava field dating from a volcanic eruption 4500 years ago in the Bláfjöll mountains some 25 km away from the city.
