= Hornito =

Conical structure built by lava ejected through the crust of a lava flow

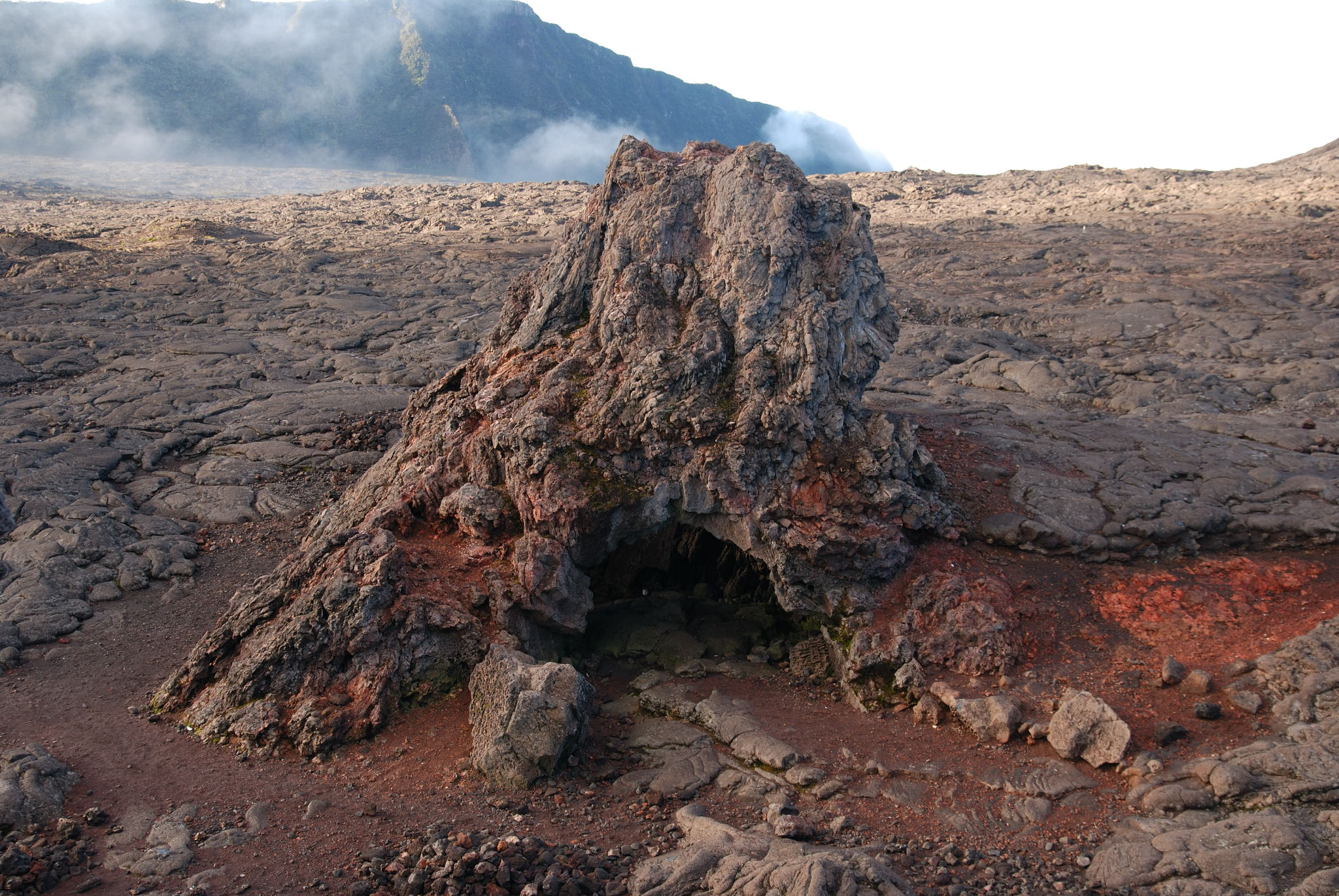
A hornito on the island of Réunion

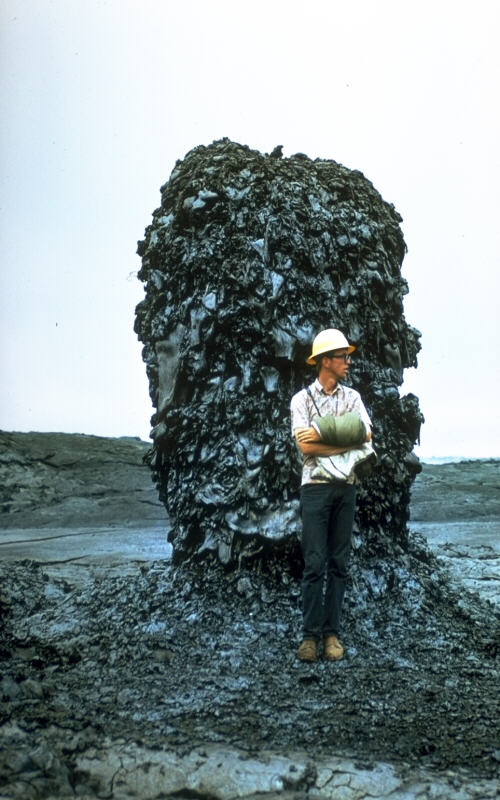
An example of a hornito on Hawaii that has built lava spatter deposits into a mound over its vent

A hornito is a conical, or pipe-like, structure built up by lava spattering or being ejected through an opening in the crust of a lava flow. Hornitos are similar to spatter cones but are rootless, meaning they were once sources of lava, but those sources were not directly associated with true vents or magma sources. They are usually created by the slow upwelling of fluid lava through the roof of lava tubes, and are often associated with pahoehoe lavas of basaltic composition. High pressure causes lava to ooze and spatter out. The lava builds up on the surface and solidifies, creating the initial structure. Hornitos can exceed 10 meters in height.

Some classic examples of hornitos have been described, or depicted, from volcanoes including El Jorullo, Mexico, which was visited by Alexander von Humboldt in 1803; Kilauea Hawaii; and Oldoinyo Lengai, Tanzania.

The term hornito comes from the Spanish for 'little oven', a reference to the way that hornitos might appear to "smoke" when they are active.
