= Elliðavatn =

Lake in Iceland

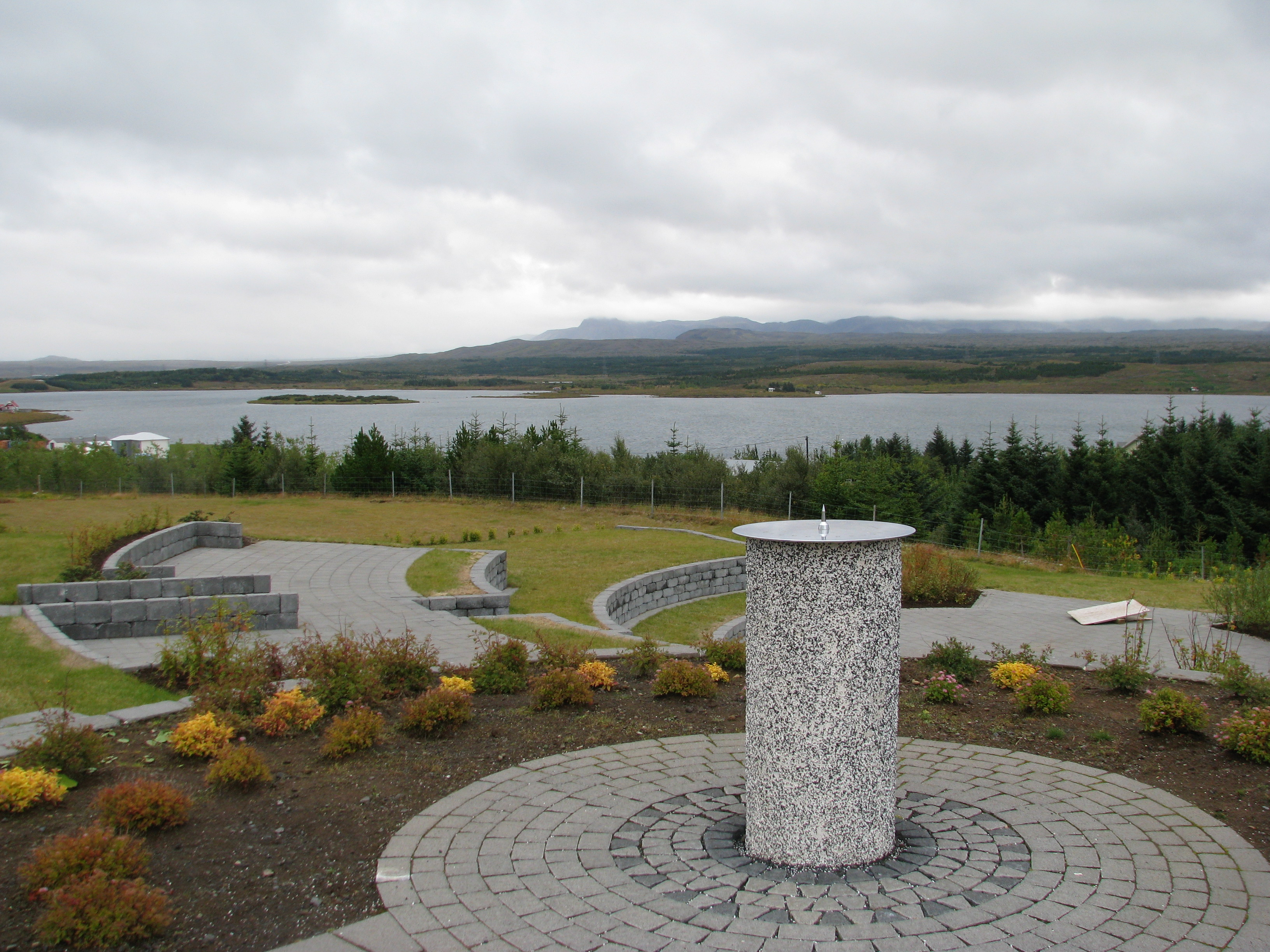

- Location within Iceland
- Coordinates: 64°05′09″N 21°47′07″W
- Primary inflows: Bugðá, Suðurá
- Primary outflows: Elliðaá
- Basin countries: Iceland
- Surface area: 2.02 km^{2} (0.78 sq mi)
- Average depth: 1.0 m (3 ft 3 in) (mean)
- Max. depth: 2.3 m (7 ft 7 in)
- Islands: Þingnes

Elliðavatn (Icelandic pronunciation: [ˈɛtlɪːðaˌvahtn̥], "Elliði's lake") is a lake in Iceland. It is situated in the area of Reykjavík.

Not far from it, there is the well known natural park Heiðmörk with its hiking and biking trails, small forests and lava formations.

The eastern shores of Elliðavatn are part of Heiðmörk nature reserve, protected by the state.

Coming on the hringvegur (Route 1) over the Hellisheiði in the direction of the capital city, travelers pass by the lake.
