= Architecture of Iceland =

The architecture of Iceland draws from Scandinavian influences and traditionally was influenced by the lack of native trees on the island. As a result, grass- and turf-covered houses were developed. Later on, the Swiss chalet style became a prevailing influence in Icelandic architecture as many timber buildings were constructed in this way. Stone and later concrete were popular building materials, the latter especially with the arrival of functionalism in the country. Contemporary architecture in Iceland is influenced by many sources, with styles varying greatly around the country.

The architecture of Iceland is mainly low-rise, with many low tower blocks and two- or three-storey buildings with pitched roofs predominating. Houses and smaller municipal buildings were traditionally wooden-framed, and clad in wooden planks or corrugated metal. Often they were painted in traditional bright colours. Many architectural influences can be seen, notably in the capital, such as the once-popular Swiss chalet style.

== Turf houses ==
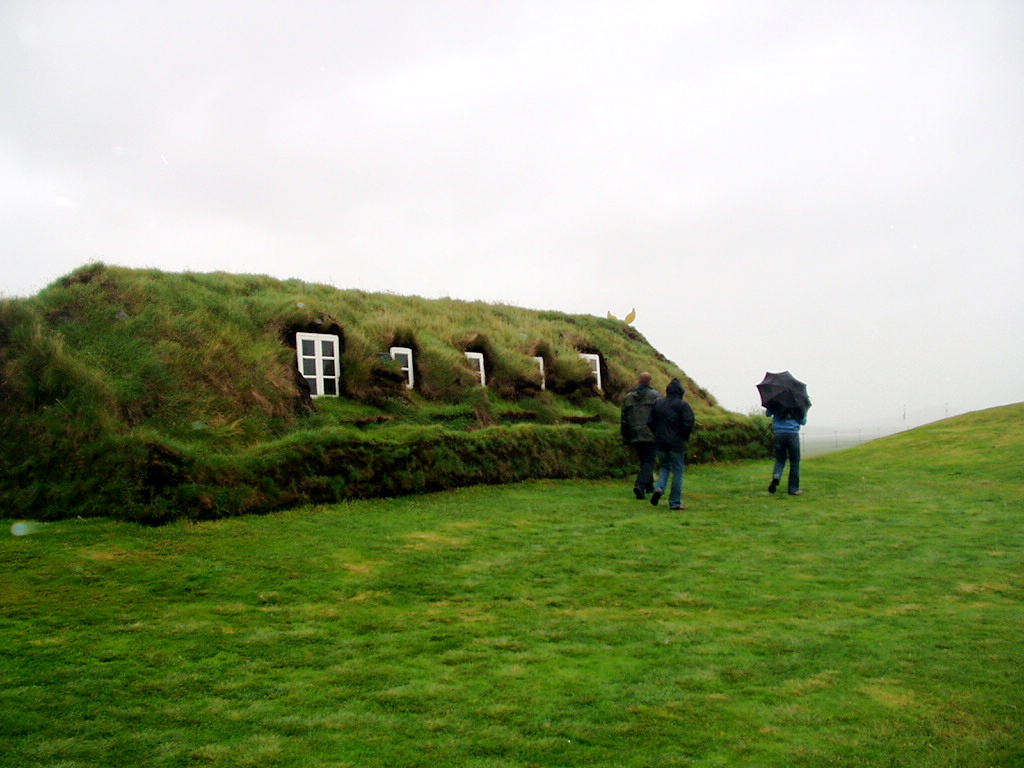
Glaumbær at Skagafjordur Folk Museum

The original turf houses constructed by the original settlers of Iceland (from the west coast of Norway) were based on Viking longhouses (langhús). The exterior turf walls were lined internally with a wooden frame, which was then paneled, with the roof resting on two rows of pillars dividing the internal space. The main room of the house was known as the skáli, consisting of a central open hearth and two raised platforms, known as set. Similar designs of longhouse have been found across Scandinavia, the Faroes and the Scottish isles, as well as Greenland.

There are many benefits and functionality to the turf houses. Turf houses provided thermal comfort to the cold, harsh climates that Iceland experiences. To prevent any cold from intruding into the house, cavities were filled with soil to add more insulation to the buildings. In addition, the turf houses required less resources, which Iceland was lacking in the late 9th century. Simple wood structures were used since wood was one of the few resources semi present. Other resources such as sod, twigs, moss, etc. were used to build the houses and further add to the thermal comfort of the houses.

Later the houses included an additional living space, the stofa, and would be accompanied by smaller outhouses. This layout also incorporated a pantry and lavatory. Over the years, the layout became more compartmentalised, eventually to include a baðstofa (a heated sauna room). In response to the colder Icelandic climate, the sleeping area was eventually moved into the baðstofa. The design evolved as the entrance was moved between the living room and main room; all the rooms in the house were joined by a central passageway, this layout was known as a gangabær. This was possibly in response to a deteriorating climate, and as timber supplies dwindled, people went back to living in the one-room baðstofa layout.

Around 1791, under Danish interest, a gable-fronted design (burstabær) was proposed by Guðlaugur Sveinsson, which became widespread in the south of Iceland where the climate is warmer. An example of this design is the Glaumbær turf farmhouse at Skagafjörður Folk Museum which was opened in 1952 at the Glaumbær Farm.

By the 20th century, the design was evolving still, seeing such additions as the framhús, a kind of timber porch at the front entrance of buildings. Today grasshouses are no longer constructed in Iceland (construction stopped in the mid-20th century), and the few remaining examples are generally open to public as open-air museums. There is some evidence to suggest a Celtic influence in early Icelandic architecture in the form of stone roundhouses and sheepcotes, however much of this is still shaded in obscurity.

== Styles and Influences ==
Like many other areas in the world, Iceland would often pull ideas from previous architectural styles, a method called historicism. Many of these styles can be seen in various buildings such as the gothic style in the churches and neoclassical style in commercial buildings such as banks. When it comes to residential buildings, a common theme seen is the simplicity in the designs, focusing more on functionality of the buildings rather than the ornamentation. Then, in the mid-18th century, there was some influence to the architecture from the Danish Government. One of the main stylistic changes seen in this time period is the transition from turf housing to stone housing.

== Stone buildings ==
Many high-quality stone buildings were erected in the 18th century, the first being a mansion on Viðey, made completely out of Icelandic stone. These were some of the first buildings in Iceland to be constructed by architects, who were from Denmark, as these buildings were constructed for the Danish authorities. The craftsmen involved in the construction of these buildings were also foreign. Icelandic stone buildings from this period were inherently similar to those in Denmark, save the use of timber to clad the roofs instead of slate. This type of building was considered very expensive and is seen in many official buildings such as Bessastaðir (the presidential residence) and Alþingishúsið in Reykjavík.

Many Icelanders learned the craft of masonry during the stone construction boom period, leading to the building of many stone houses which mimicked the design of Icelandic turf houses.

== Church buildings ==
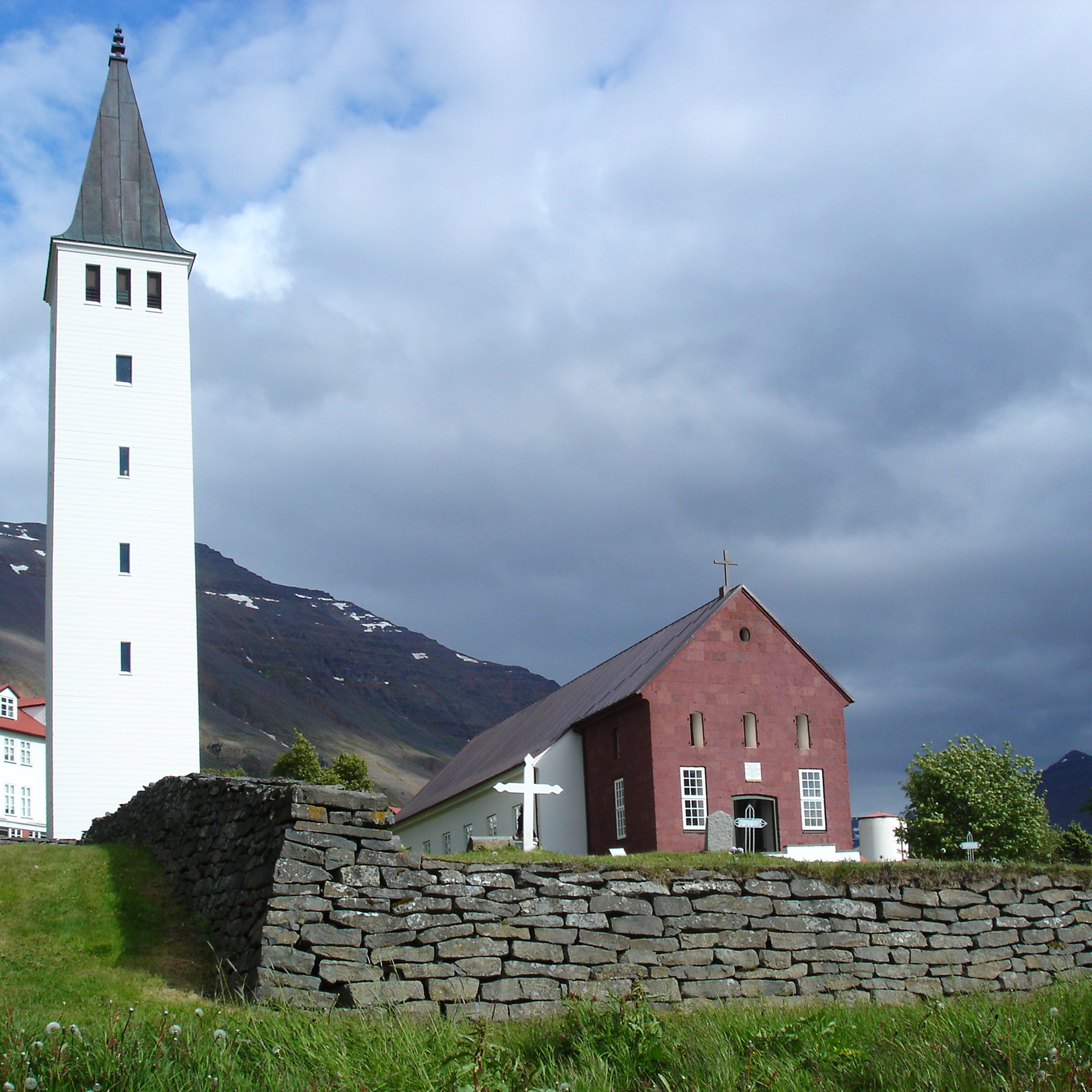
Hólar Cathedral, in Hólar, is the largest stone church constructed in the country.

With the arrival of Christianity in Iceland in 1000 AD, construction began on numerous impressive churches. A majority were probably constructed out of turf, but there were also numerous timber-framed churches, however not much remains of these buildings today. The first stone churches appeared in around in the 18th century, quite late considering the significant lack of timber on the island (even access to driftwood was not widespread).

In the oldest part of Reykjavik, the Eastern Hill, housed the Skólavörðuhol church. The Skólavörðuhol was designed by Guðjón Samúelsson, who built it with a romantic style originated in Scandinavia. It was designed with a Greek cross layout and contained a dome. In addition, over on the Western Hill, the Landakotskirkja church, also known as the Basilica of Christ the King, was built. This church was also designed by Guðjón Samúelsson but with a Neo-Gothic style. The Landakotskirkja was the largest church in Iceland in 1929. During this same time, Jón Helgason held a competition for the design of the Hallgrímskirkja church, which was to be built where the Skólavörðuhol once was. The Skólavörðuhol was to be built using the Gothic revival style and was designed by Águst Pálsson, who had won the competition.

== Urbanization ==
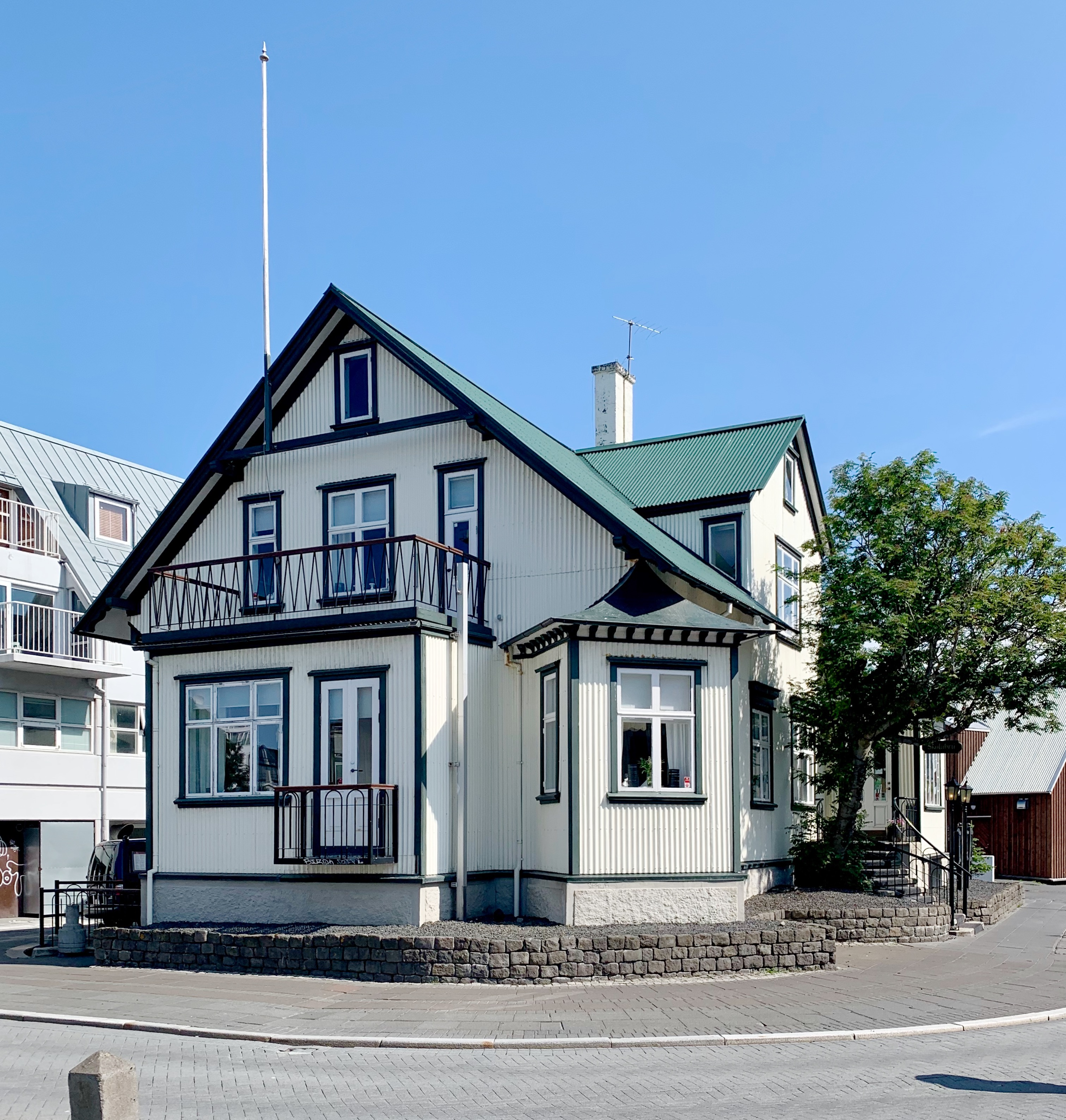
A house in Reykjavík showing typical corrugated metal siding.

Urbanization began to appear around the 18th century, when Danish merchants set up permanent trading posts for themselves. The timber for constructing these residential and commercial premises was mostly prefabricated and imported. These timber-framed buildings had high pitched roofs and low walls, and they were tarred on the outside making them dark in appearance.

With the movement towards independence from Denmark and the implementation of Icelandic free trade, more diverse architectural styles and influences were brought to the island. Classical influences can be seen in timber buildings from the 19th century, these buildings were often two-storey and had higher walls. Details such as the layout of fenestration on the building drew from classical traditions. A few buildings in this style remain today.

As the 20th century dawned, Swiss chalet style architecture was brought indirectly to Iceland under Norwegian influence. Prefabricated houses were shipped and erected in settlements in the Eastern Region and Westfjords. The buildings tended to be taller and with large windows, unlike anything of the styles that had prevailed in Iceland beforehand. Notable features of these buildings were the friezes above doors and windows, and eaves which projected out above the walls. Here the distinctive Icelandic use of corrugated iron (imported from England), in place of external cladding, was born. The Swiss chalet style was the dominant force in Icelandic architecture in the early 20th century. The use of timber was banned in urban areas after great fires in Reykjavík and Akureyri around this time.

Concrete was first used on a major scale as a building material in this period and became extremely popular as an easy and economical construction material. The material has shaped Icelandic architecture from this period. With the arrival of concrete came the first qualified Icelandic architect, Rögnvaldur Ólafsson, who had at first designed in the Swiss chalet style but soon moved on to working in concrete. His first works in concrete resembled closely the stone buildings of earlier times.

Characteristically urban buildings began to emerge, such as Austurstræti 16 (designed by Guðjón Samúelsson) which were concrete constructions. Guðjón went on to become the leading Icelandic architect of the time. Referencing traditional Icelandic architectural styles, he revived the gable-fronted house design in concrete. This influence can be seen in stylised form in the National Theatre of Iceland building, for example. Guðjón Samúelsson was also the designer of Hallgrímskirkja, one of the tallest structures in Iceland, which was modelled on cliff faces.

== Contemporary architecture ==
The functionalist architectural style arrived in Iceland in the 1930s, brought by younger architects who would later have great influence on the urban planning of the country. Unusually, functionalism was not met with as much controversy as it was in other countries at the time. Early functionalist buildings in the country resembled those elsewhere in Europe, but conventional interior layouts being their differentiating feature. Many neighbourhoods were built up using the functionalist aesthetic as their guide. The buildings were made distinctively Icelandic with the use of local minerals and seashells as dashing. Whole residential districts were dashed in this way. After World War II, larger houses with higher roofs began to appear, with a variety of decorative features marking a departure from the functionalist aesthetic.

The next wave of architectural style to arrive was modernism, appearing after the country's gain of independence from Denmark. Influential architects created modernist buildings with low roofs and large windows and large, smooth expanses of colour (in contrast to the dashing style which was popular earlier). Modernist architecture commanded a modernist interior to boot, and so here began a strong furniture industry. New building techniques led to the construction of concrete high-rises in Reykjavík. Here new movements began to show up, such as an increase in popularity of open plan interiors.

In addition to new styles and influences arriving, a sentiment for the conservation of existing older buildings was founded, with newfound interest in traditional handicrafts. Criticism of modern Icelandic architecture appeared at this time, pointing out energy-wasting designs and drawing from traditional building techniques such as steep pitched roofs to find solutions.

Many projects proposed during the boom period before the 2008–2011 Icelandic financial crisis, including Iceland's first skyscrapers, the Höfðatorg and Smáratorg towers have been constructed.

Many of the taller buildings in the Reykjavík area look out of place when compared with their neighbours, for example traditional wooden houses neighbour the Höfðatorg Tower 1.

Other projects include the Harpa, completed in 2011, whose ambitious plans had originally included a world trade centre

Funding for the concert hall became insecure with the economic crisis, although the Icelandic government later promised that the project would be completed, with state funding.

== Gallery ==
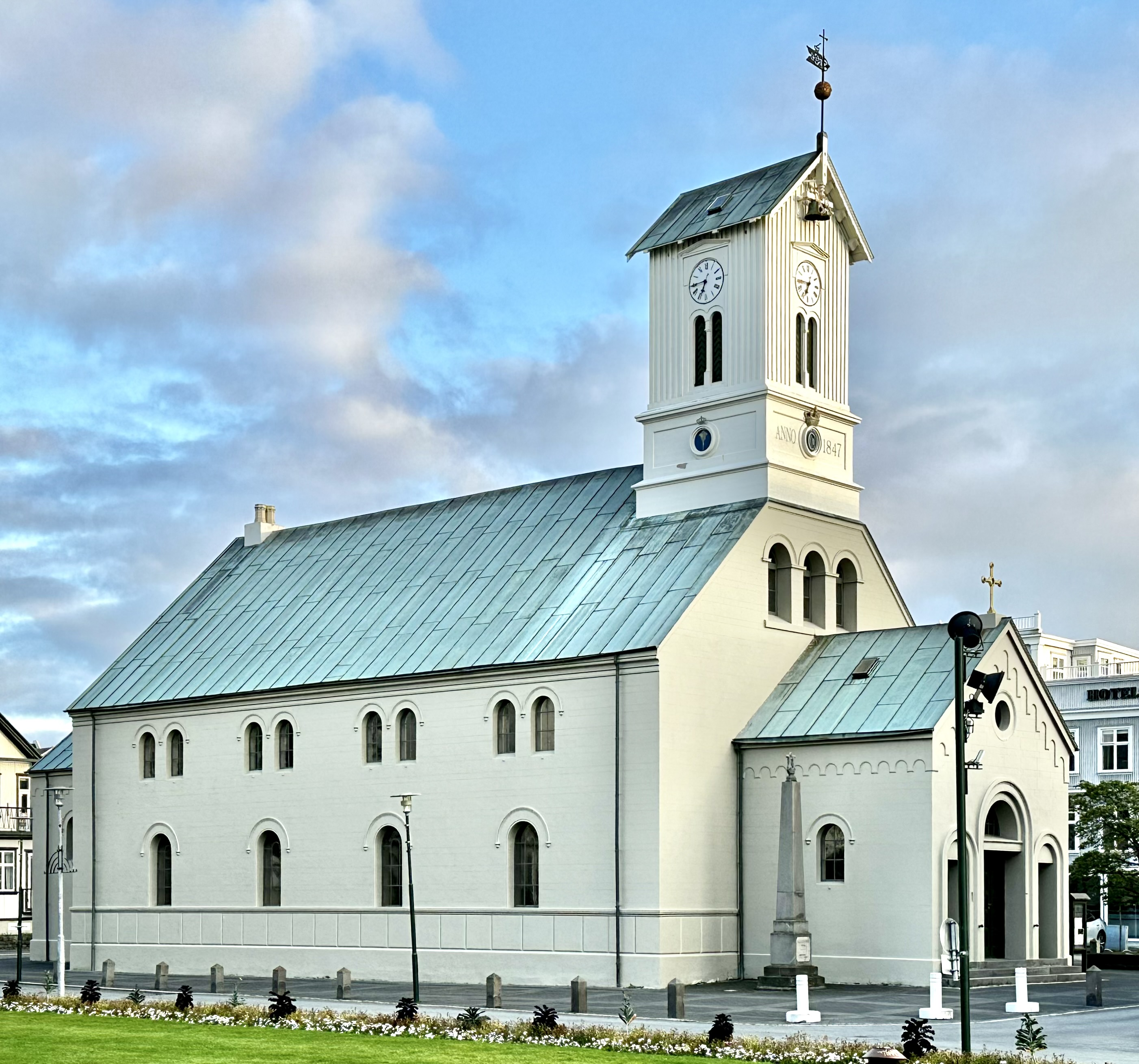
Reykjavík Cathedral (by Laurits Albert Winstrup, 1847–1849)

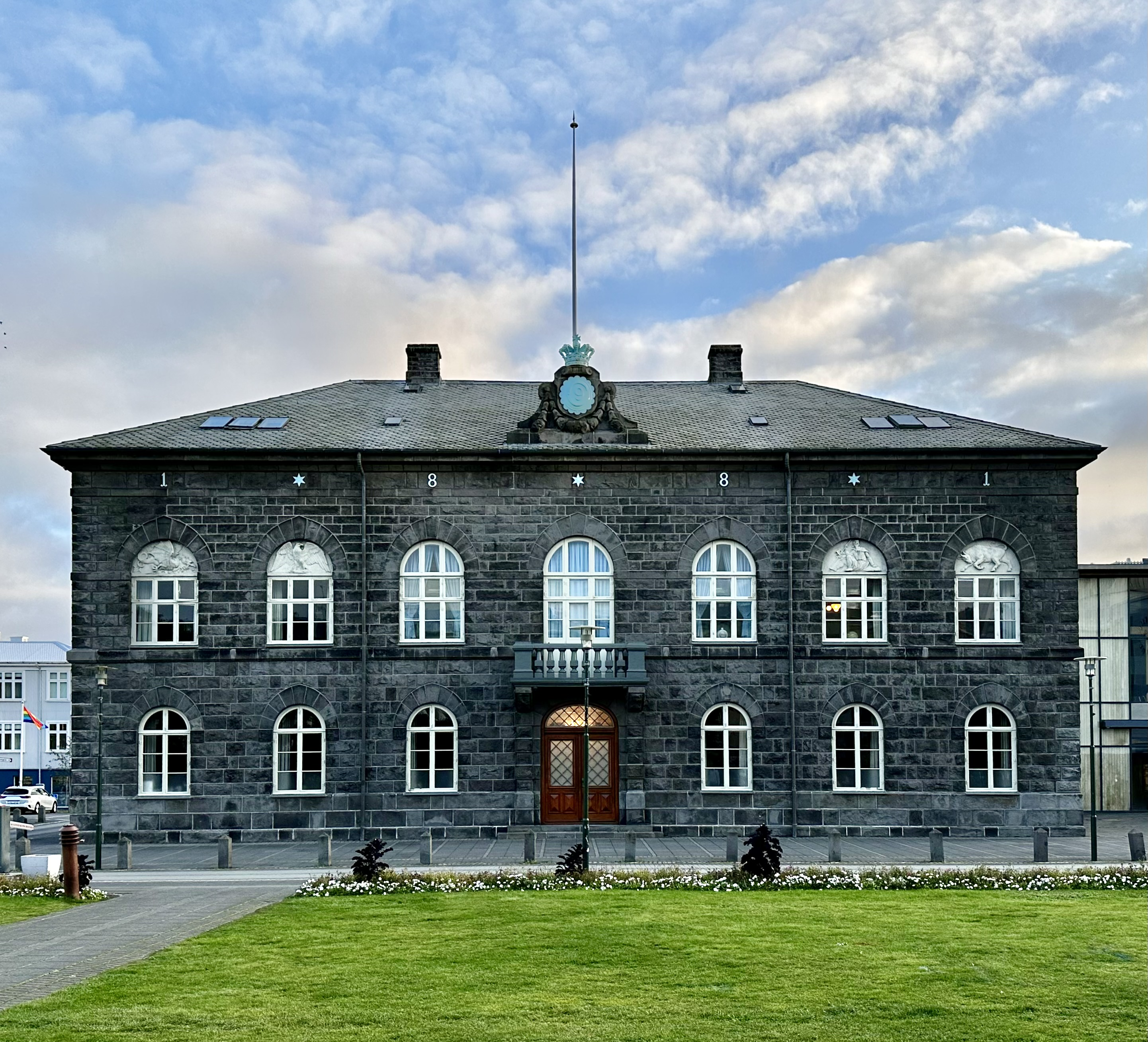
Parliament House in Reykjavík (by Ferdinand Meldahl, 1880–1881)

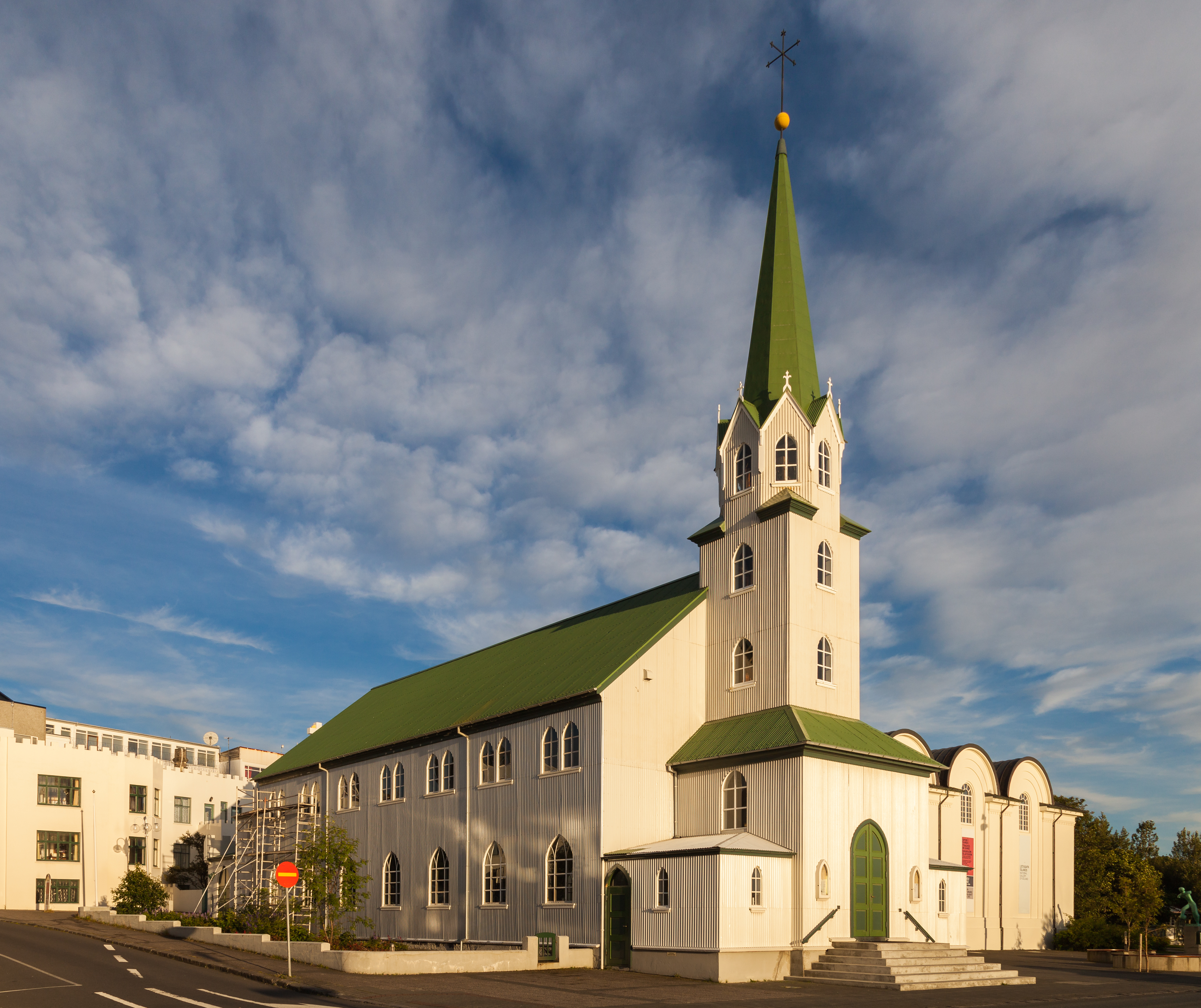
Free Church in Reykjavik (1901)

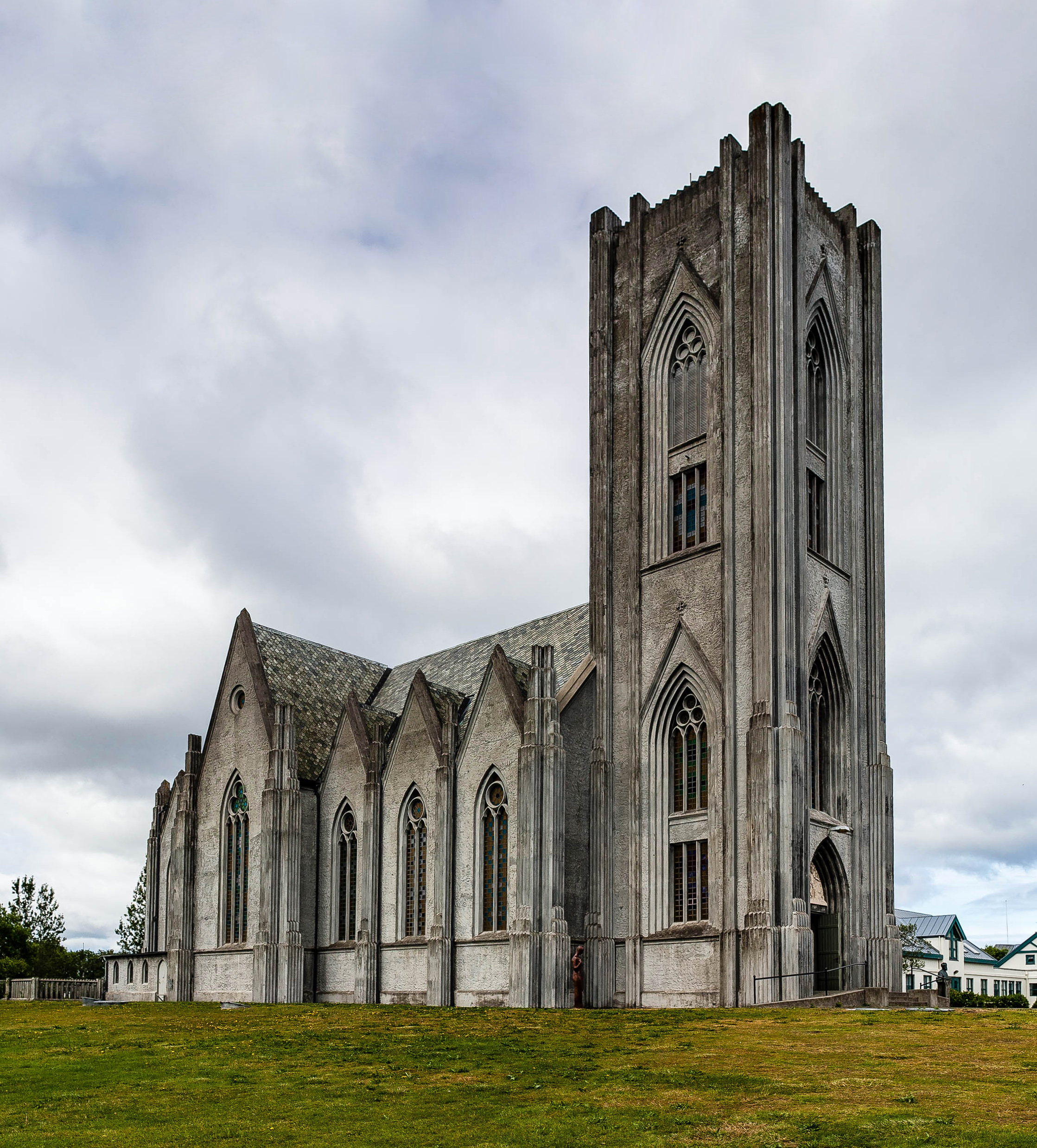
Catholic Christ the King Cathedral in Reykjavík (by Guðjón Samúelsson, 1929)

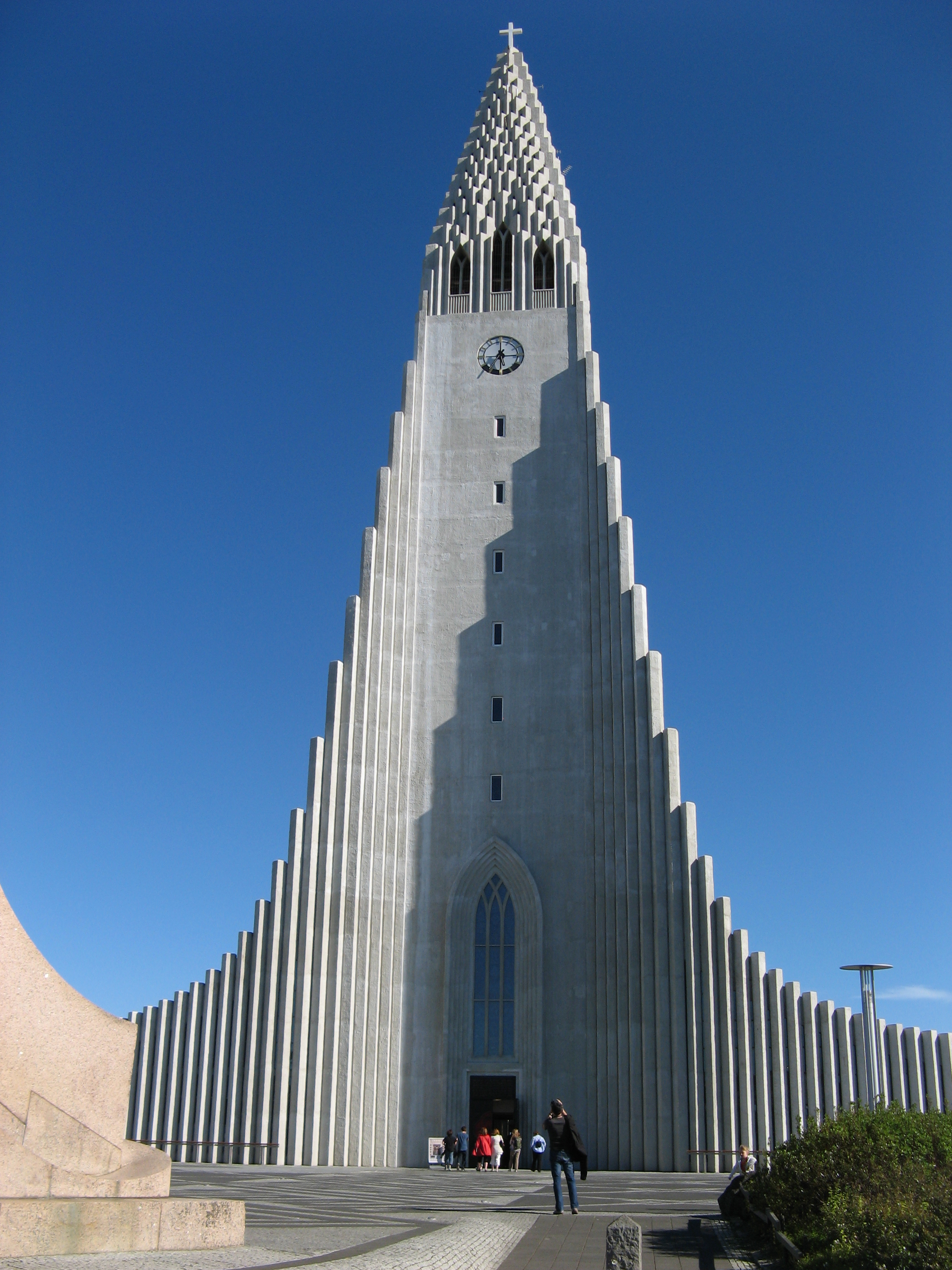
Hallgrímskirkja in Reykjavík (by Guðjón Samúelsson, 1945–1986)

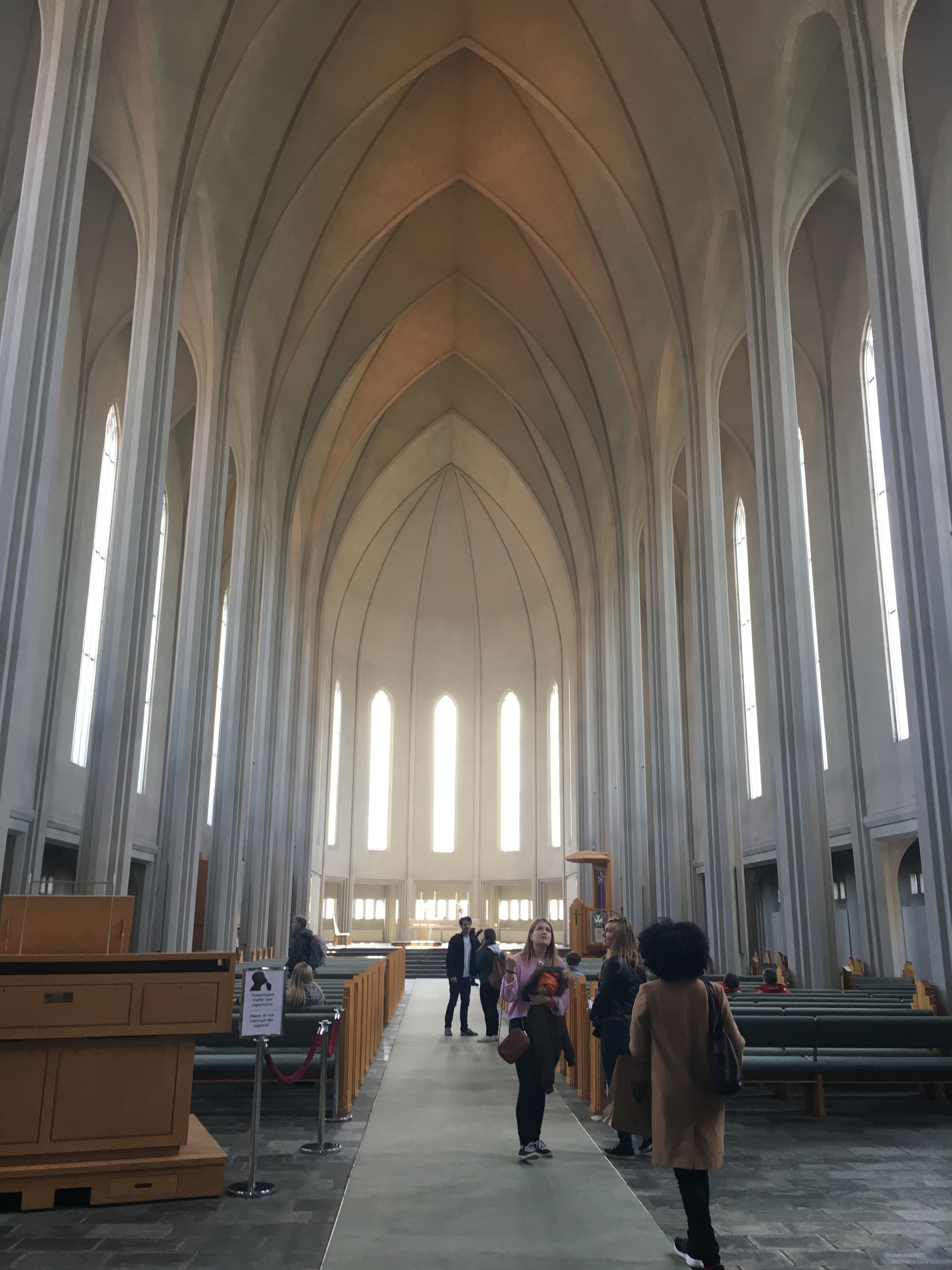
Hallgrímskirkja in Reykjavík (by Guðjón Samúelsson, 1945–1986) - interior

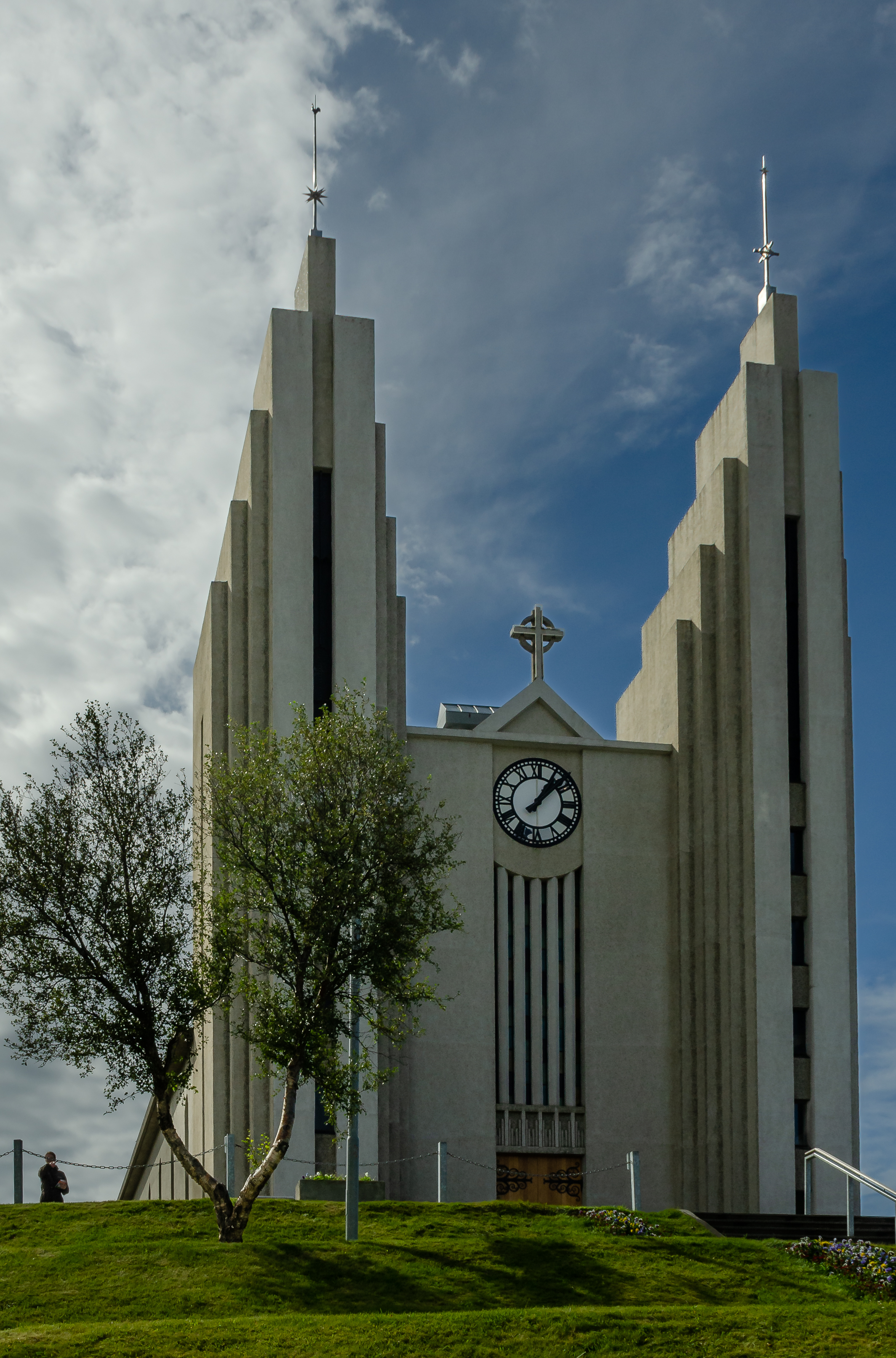
Akureyrarkirkja in Akureyri (by Guðjón Samúelsson, 1940)

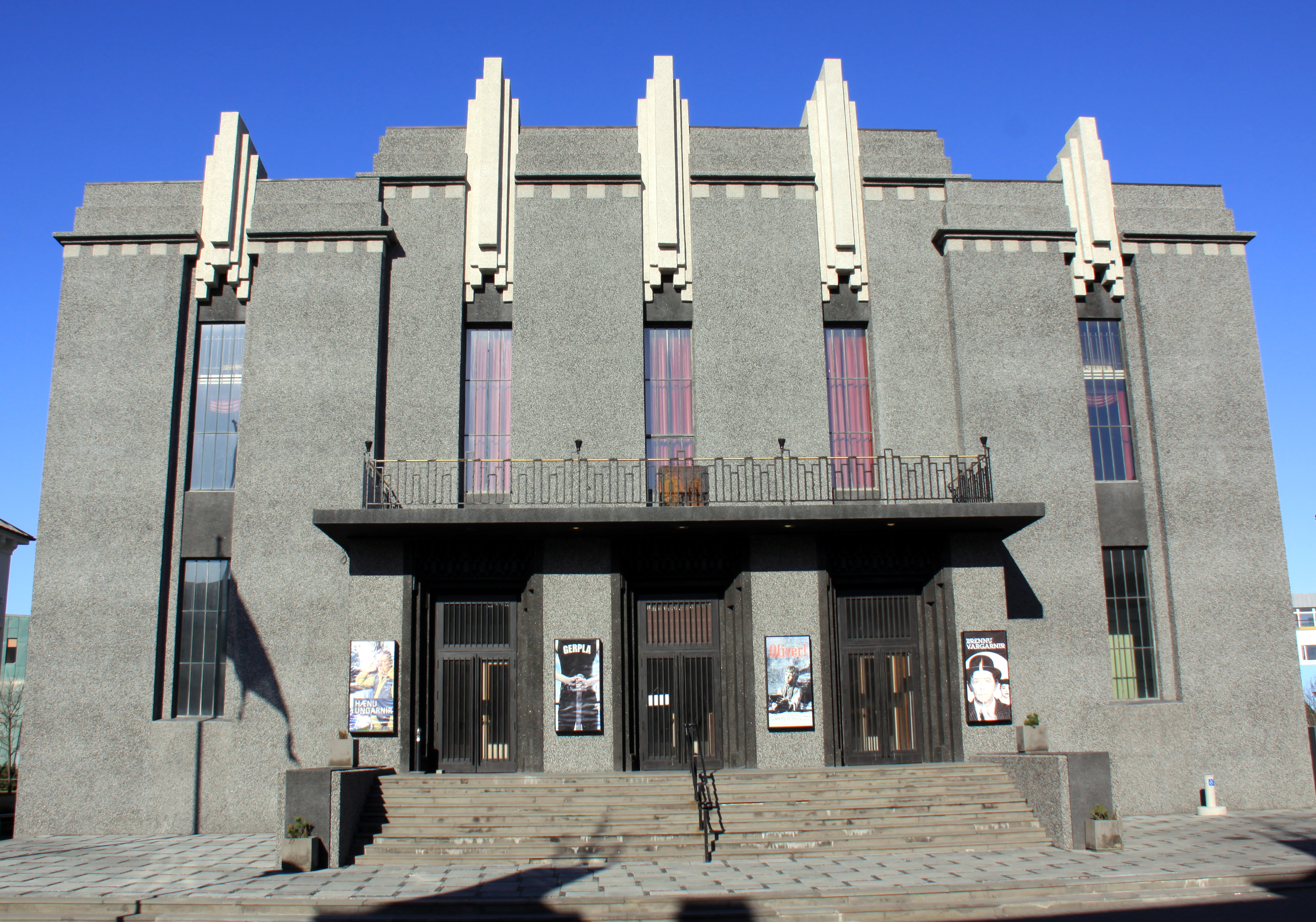
National Theatre of Iceland in Reykjavík (by Guðjón Samúelsson, 1929–1950)

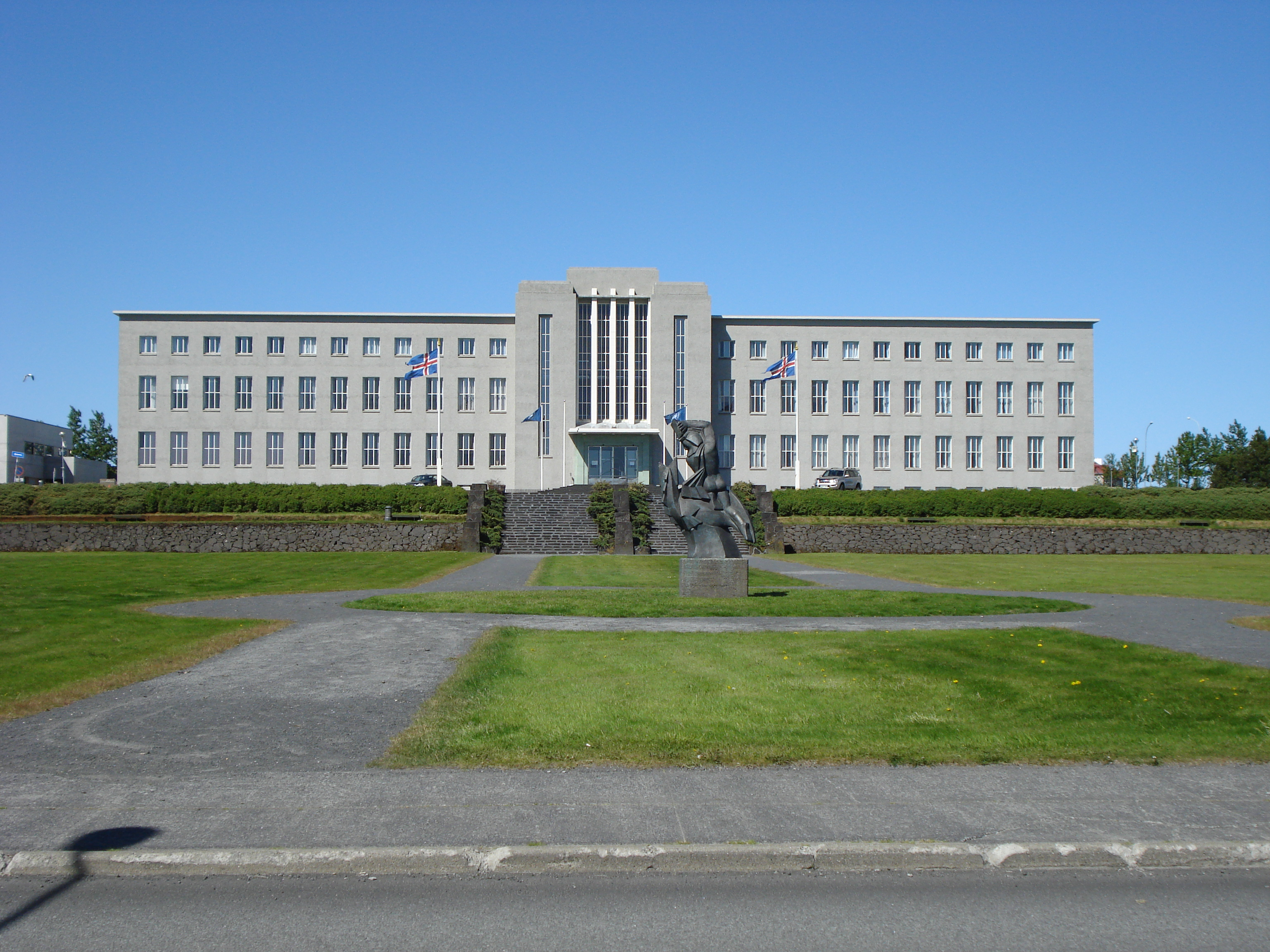
University of Iceland in Reykjavík (by Guðjón Samúelsson, 1940)

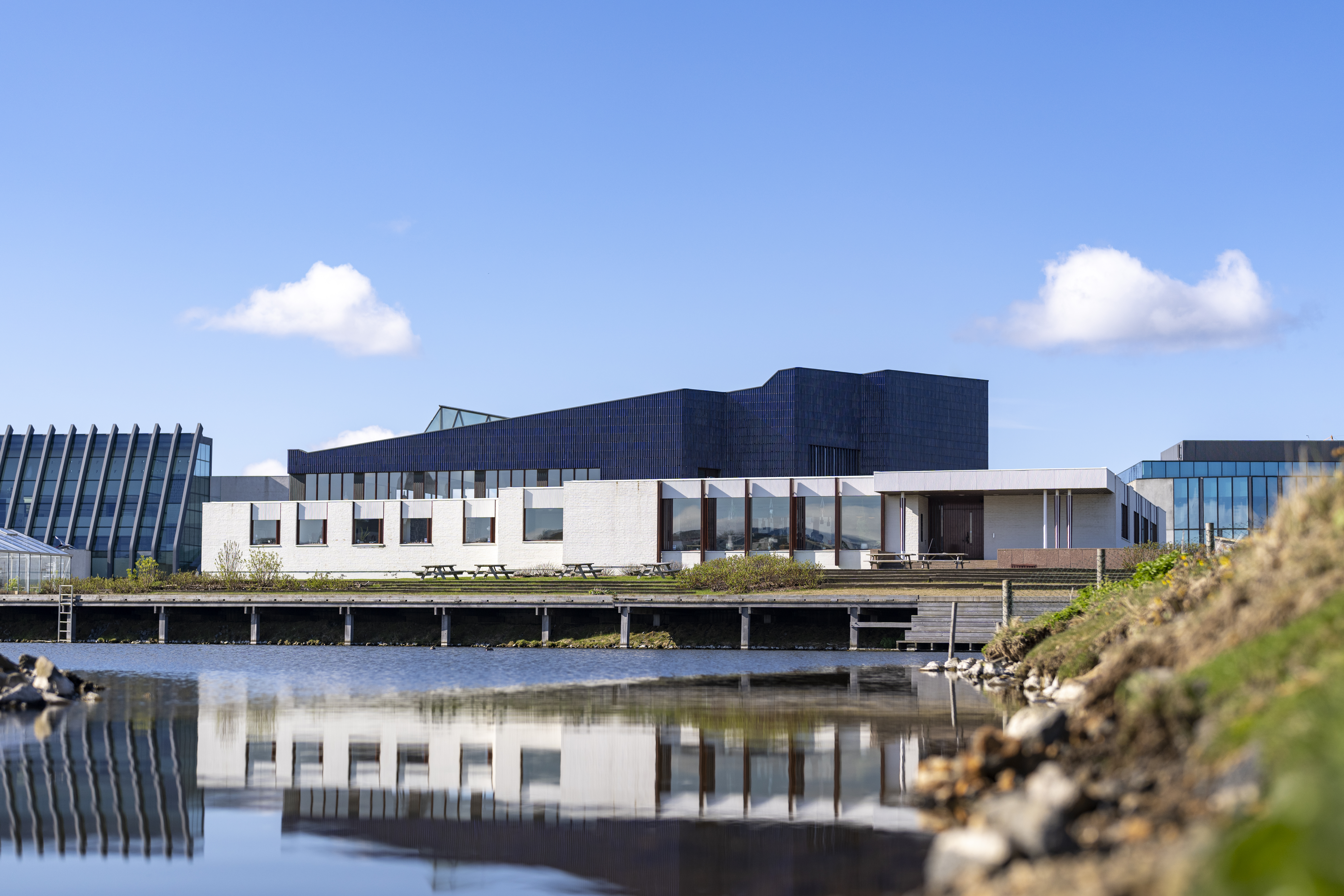
Nordic House in Reykjavík (by Alvar Aalto, 1965–1968)

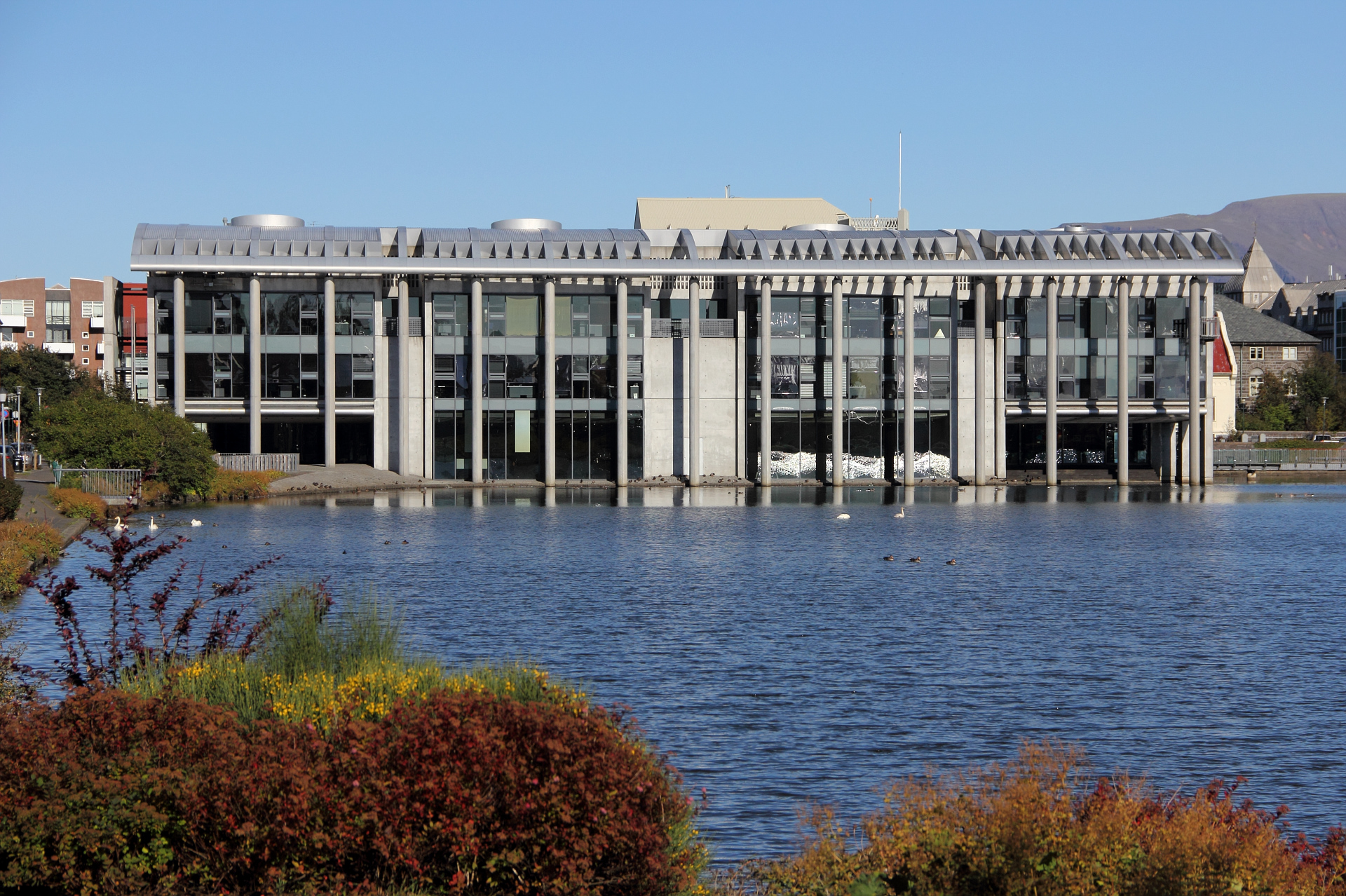
Reykjavík Town Hall (by Studio Granda, 1987–1992)

Harpa (concert hall) in Reykjavík (by Henning Larsen Architects and Olafur Eliasson, 2007–2011)

== Notable buildings ==
- Hallgrímskirkja
- Perlan
- Smáratorg Tower
- Supreme Court of Iceland

== See also ==
- Architecture of Denmark
- Architecture of Norway
