= Sundhöll Reykjavíkur =

Swimming pool in Iceland

Coordinates: 64.1417°N 21.9203°W

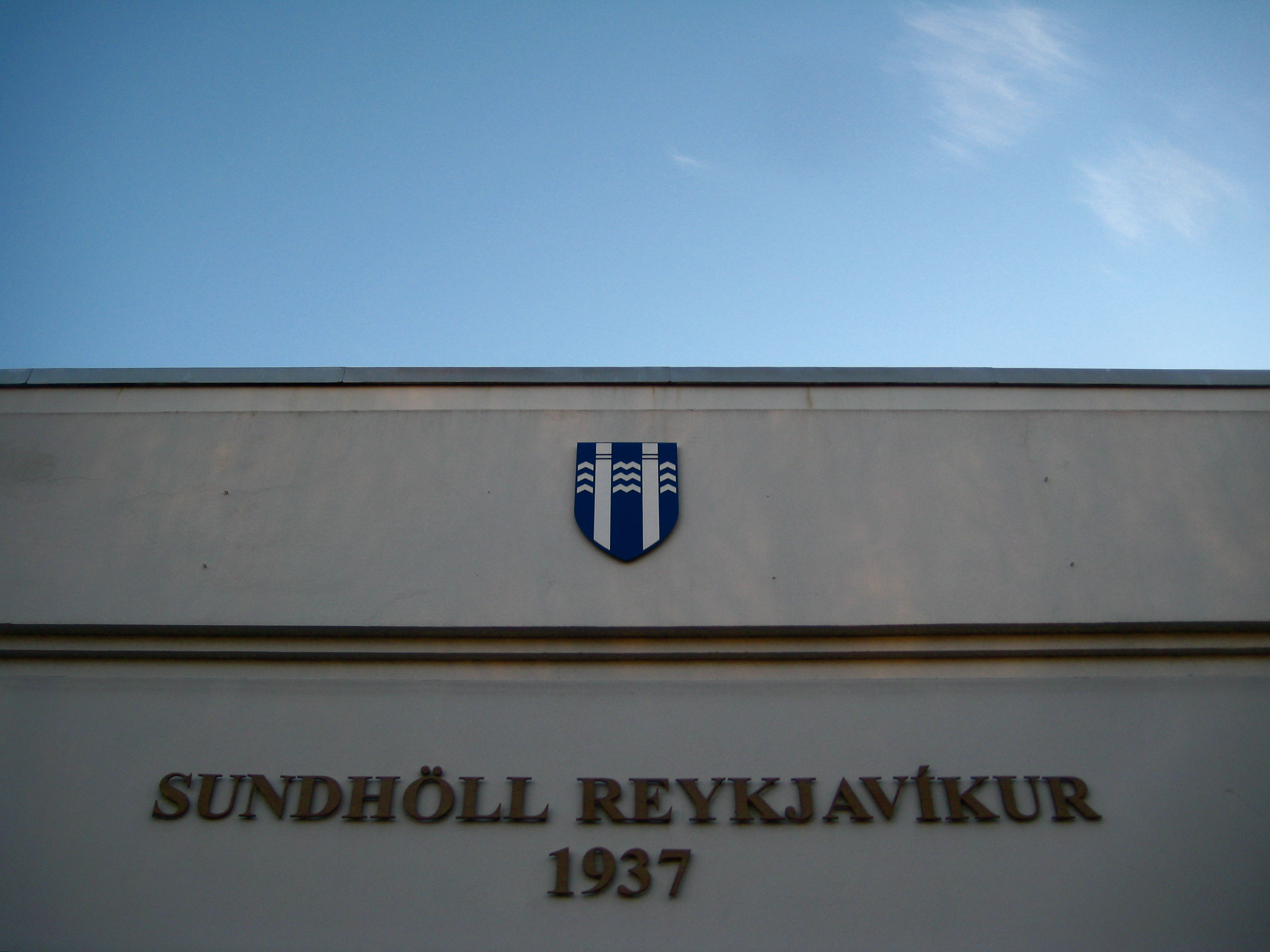
- Entrance sign.
- Interactive map of Sundhöll Reykjavíkur
- Location: Barónsstígur, Reykjavík City Center, Reykjavík, 101
- Owner: Reykjavíkurborg
- Type: Indoor + outdoor pool
- Dimensions: 25×10 m (indoor pool); Depth: 4 m (indoor pool max depth)

Construction
- Opened: 1937
- Architect: Guðjón Samúelsson

Website
- Official site

Sundhöll Reykjavíkur (lit. "Reykjavík Swimming Palace", often shortened to Sundhöllin, but that name can also apply to other indoor swimming pools in Iceland), is the oldest purpose-built indoor swimming pool in Reykjavík. It was designed by the Icelandic architect Guðjón Samúelsson and opened in 1937 at Barónsstígur, close to the elementary school Austurbæjarskóli. Along with Austurbæjarskóli and Landspítali, it was one of the first buildings in Reykjavík that made use of geothermal water that the public utility Laugaveitan pumped via a 3 km long pipe from Laugardalur. Originally the building was supposed to be finished in 1930, but work stalled due to the Great Depression. The building's exterior is a minimalist white that is almost Art Deco in style with tall narrow rectangular windows. Inside arches on the south side of the pool and the tiled changing rooms are other notable features. The main pool is 25 by 10 metres (82 by 33 ft) and with a depth from 0.9 to 4 metres (2 ft 11 in to 13 ft 1 in). There are also hot tubs, and Guðjón's Hallgrímskirkja can be seen from the sundeck.

When the pool opened it soon became the main place for teaching swimming, which had become obligatory for schoolchildren in 1927. It also became the main training pool for poolsports. Initially there were gender-segregated days each week when people could swim naked. The swimming pool had an important function as a public bath when bathrooms were still uncommon in Reykjavík. In 2010, Icelandic filmmaker Héðinn Halldórsson made the documentary film The Palace (Höllin) about Sundhöllin and the people who frequented it at the time. The film follows a group of elderly people who attend workout sessions in the pool early in the morning, and the staff who receive them.

In 2017, after a year of renovations, a new reception and an outdoor pool were added to Sundhöllin. The outdoor area was designed by VA Arkitektar. It has unheated changing areas and showers, a 25 meter long 4 lane swimming pool (much shallower than the indoor pool), a playpool, a large hot tub with massage spouts, a cold tub with water that is around 10 °C, and a sauna. New changing rooms for women were added below the reception, and the old ones closed for renovation. The new arrangement was criticised as women who use the indoor pool now had to cross the outdoor area first. The only indoor passageway from the new changing rooms was through the (now closed) old changing rooms. The old women's changing rooms were reopened in March 2022. In 2022, the city had to pay 3.5 million Icelandic krona in damages to a woman who fell and broke an arm on a mat that had been placed in the outdoor area in 2018. The surface has since been treated to make it less slippery.
