= Akureyrarkirkja =

Church building in Akureyri, Iceland

The Church of Akureyri
- Akureyrarkirkja
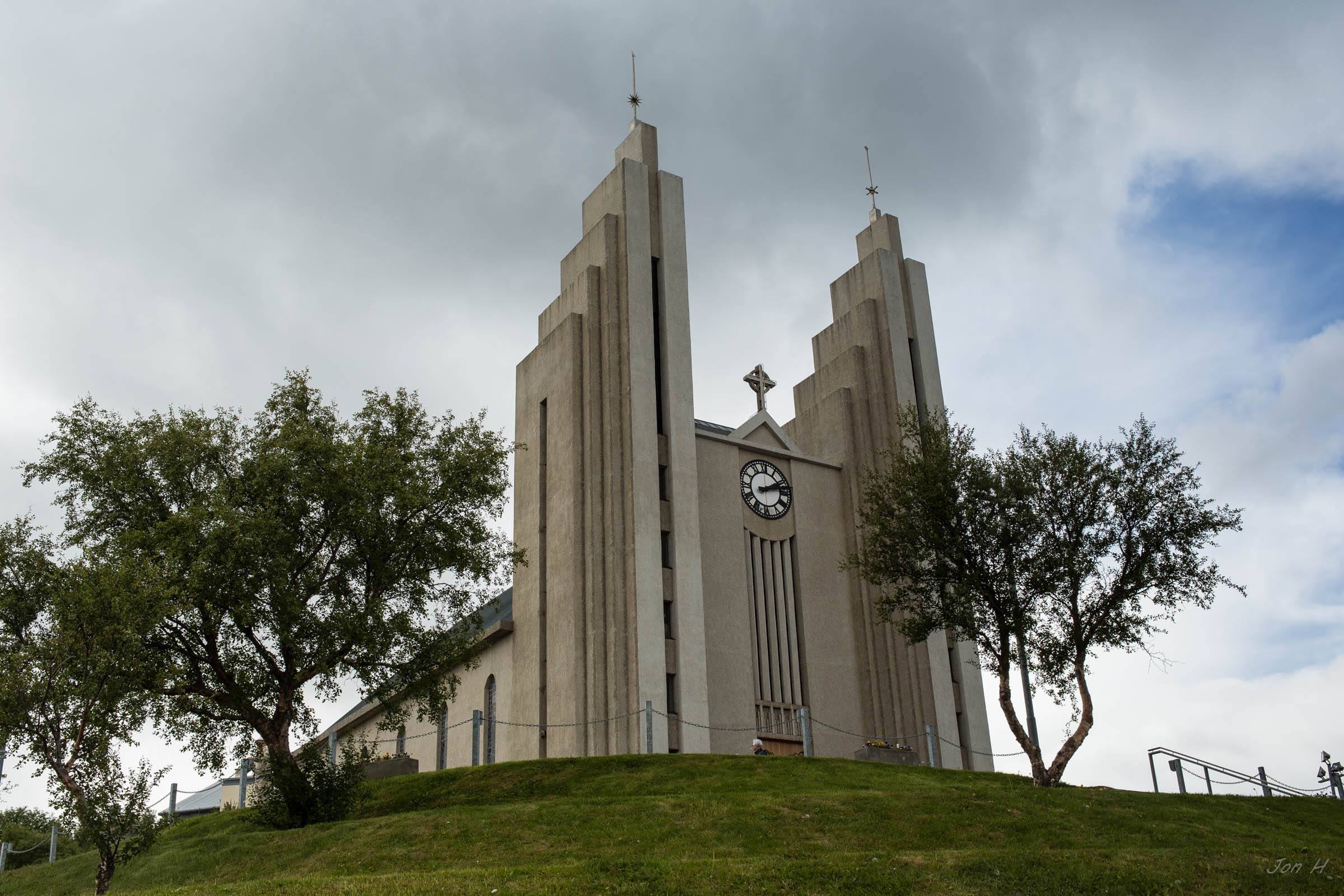
- Akureyrarkirkja
- The Church of Akureyri
- 65.6799°N 18.0908°W
- Location: Akureyri
- Country: Iceland
- Denomination: Church of Iceland
- Website: Official website

History
- Status: Parish church

Architecture
- Functional status: Active
- Architect: Guðjón Samúelsson
- Completed: 1940

Akureyrarkirkja (Icelandic pronunciation: [ˈaːkʏrˌeiːrarˌcʰɪr̥ca], regionally also [ˈaːkʰʏr-]) or The Church of Akureyri is a prominent Lutheran church at Akureyri in northern Iceland. Located in the centre of the city, it was designed by Guðjón Samúelsson (1887–1950) and completed in 1940.

Akureyrarkirkja contains a notably large 3,200-pipe organ. The bas-reliefs on the nave balcony are by sculptor Ásmundur Sveinsson (1893–1982). The altarpiece dates to 1863 and was designed by Danish artist Edvard Lehmann (1815–1892). The windows were designed and made by J. Wippel & Co. of Exeter, Devon in Britain. The Italian white marble baptismal font is made by Florentine sculptor Corrado Vigni (1888–1956). The angel baptismal font is a replica of a work by noted Danish sculptor Bertel Thorvaldsen (1770–1844). The original work is situated at Copenhagen Cathedral (Vor Frue Kirke).

In 2017, the church was vandalized, and incurred 20 million ISK in damage ($157493 USD, or €129374 EUR).
