= Guðjón Samúelsson =

State Architect of Iceland

- Born: Guðjón Samúelsson; 16 April 1887; Iceland
- Died: 25 April 1950 (aged 63); Reykjavík, Iceland
- Known for: Architecture
- Notable work: Hallgrímskirkja, University of Iceland, National Theatre of Iceland, Akureyrarkirkja, and many others buildings

Guðjón Samúelsson (16 April 1887 – 25 April 1950) was a State Architect of Iceland, and the first Icelander to be educated in architecture. He has been described as one of Iceland's most influential architects. His notable designs include the main building of the University of Iceland, the National Theatre of Iceland, the Landakot Roman Catholic Cathedral in Reykjavík, and the Church of Akureyri. His final and most recognized work is the Hallgrímskirkja church, which was commissioned in 1937.

== Biography ==
Not much of his early life is known. He completed his studies in 1919.

Icelandic architect Pétur Ármannsson describes him as a dominant figure in Icelandic architecture during the 1920s. During this time, Guðjón was commissioned to plan the major buildings constructed by the Icelandic state. He played a key role in the urban planning of Reykjavík, just as Iceland was urbanizing and modernizing.

He tried to create an Icelandic style of architecture. Many of his designs were said to be inspired by the natural geology of Iceland. Guðjón's design of Hallgrímskirkja was, for instance, inspired by basalt columns, such as those at Svartifoss. Guðjón characterized his design of the main-building of the University of Iceland as a distinct and new Icelandic style that he believed would contribute to the revival of the Icelandic Commonwealth. When the British occupied Iceland in 1940, the British commander reportedly opted not to seize the University of Iceland main-building because he considered it too beautiful.

His architecture for rural areas, such as the Héraðsskólinn school house, was inspired by Icelandic turf houses. Attempts to re-introduce turf house style buildings to rural areas ended in the 1930s, as these buildings were neither deemed cost-effective nor useful. Guðjón, for instance, opted not for the turf house style when he designed the school house at Reykholt.

Many Icelandic church designs are influenced by those of Guðjón, and blend naturalism with modernism.

A retrospective exhibition of Guðjón's work was held at the Hafnarborg in Hafnarfjördur in 2019-2020, on the centenary of his graduation (1919) and appointment as state architect (1920).

== Other works ==
- Sundhöllin swimming pool.
- Museum of local history in Kópasker
- The house in the corner Austurstræti / Pósthússtræti, Reykjavík, built in 1916/1917, is the first large building in Iceland. it was influenced by Art Nouveau and Danish Nationalist Romanticism and ornated with statues by Einar Jónsson. Inside the building, there was an agency of Landsbankinn and the Reykjavíkurapótek that opened in 1930. After its closure, the restaurant Apótekið moved in
- Landspítalinn
- Hótel Borg
- Héraðsskólinn school house at Laugarvatn. Constructed in 1928, the school has since been converted into a hostel. Guðjón chose the location for the school house; he chose this particular location due to the nearby hot spring and due to the pleasant scenery.
- Landakotskirkja (Landakot's Church), formally Basilika Krists konungs (The Basilica of Christ the King), which is the cathedral of the Catholic Church in Iceland.
- Sundhöll Keflavíkur.
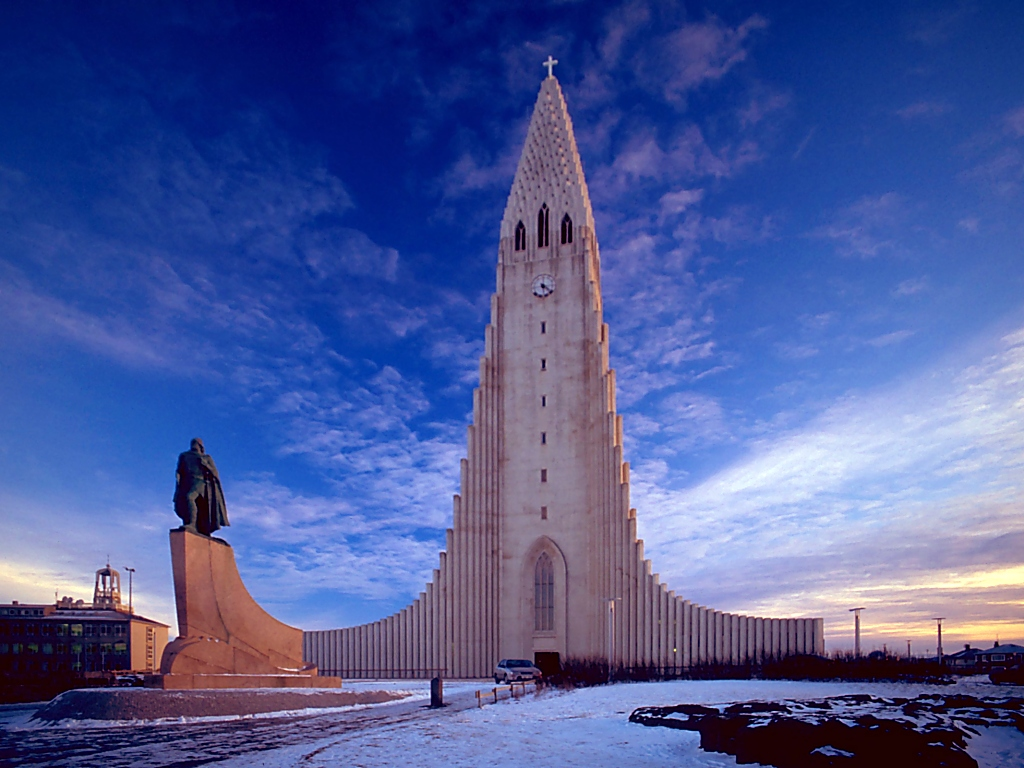
Hallgrímskirkja in Reykjavík

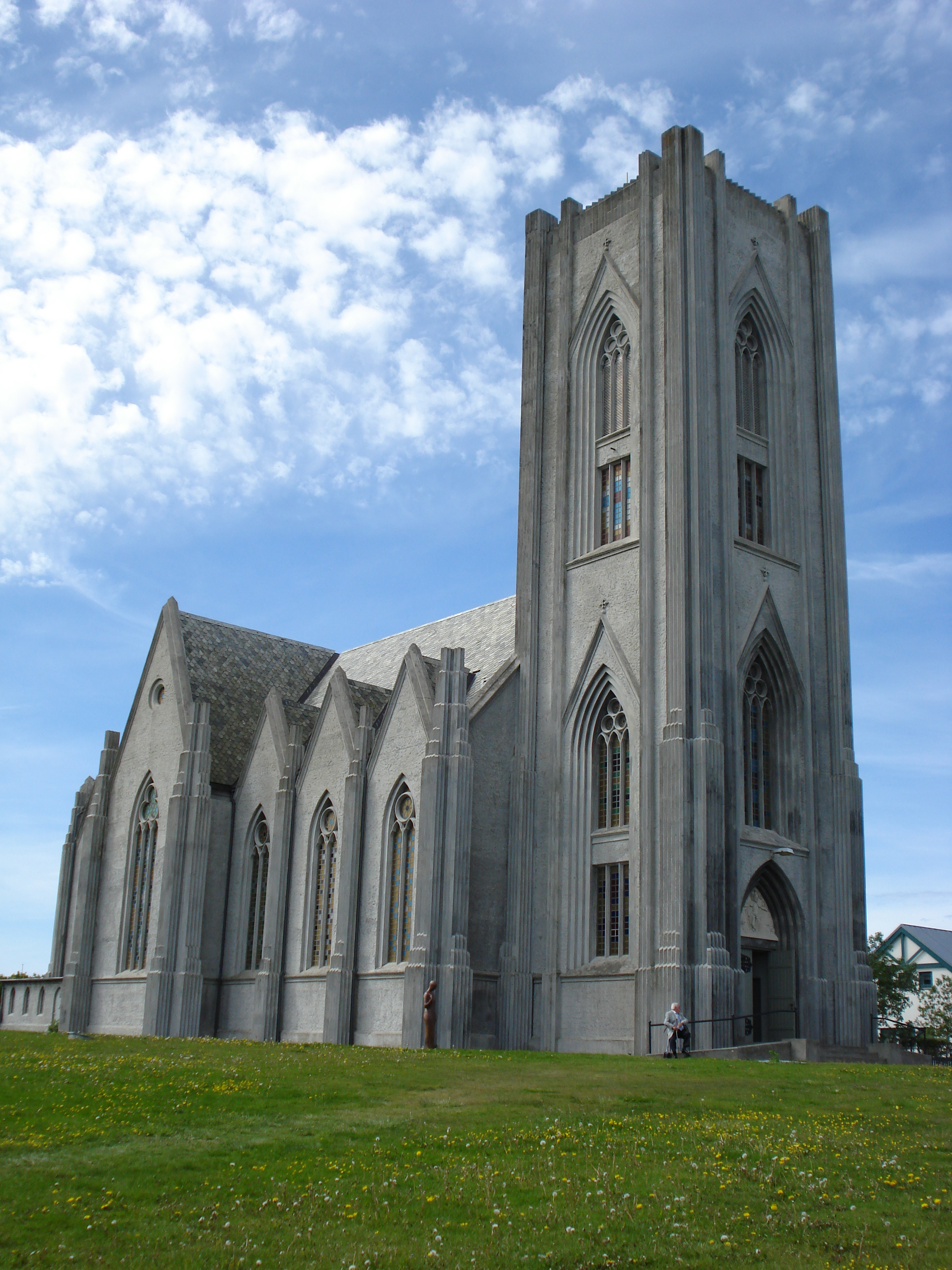
Landakotskirkja in Reykjavík

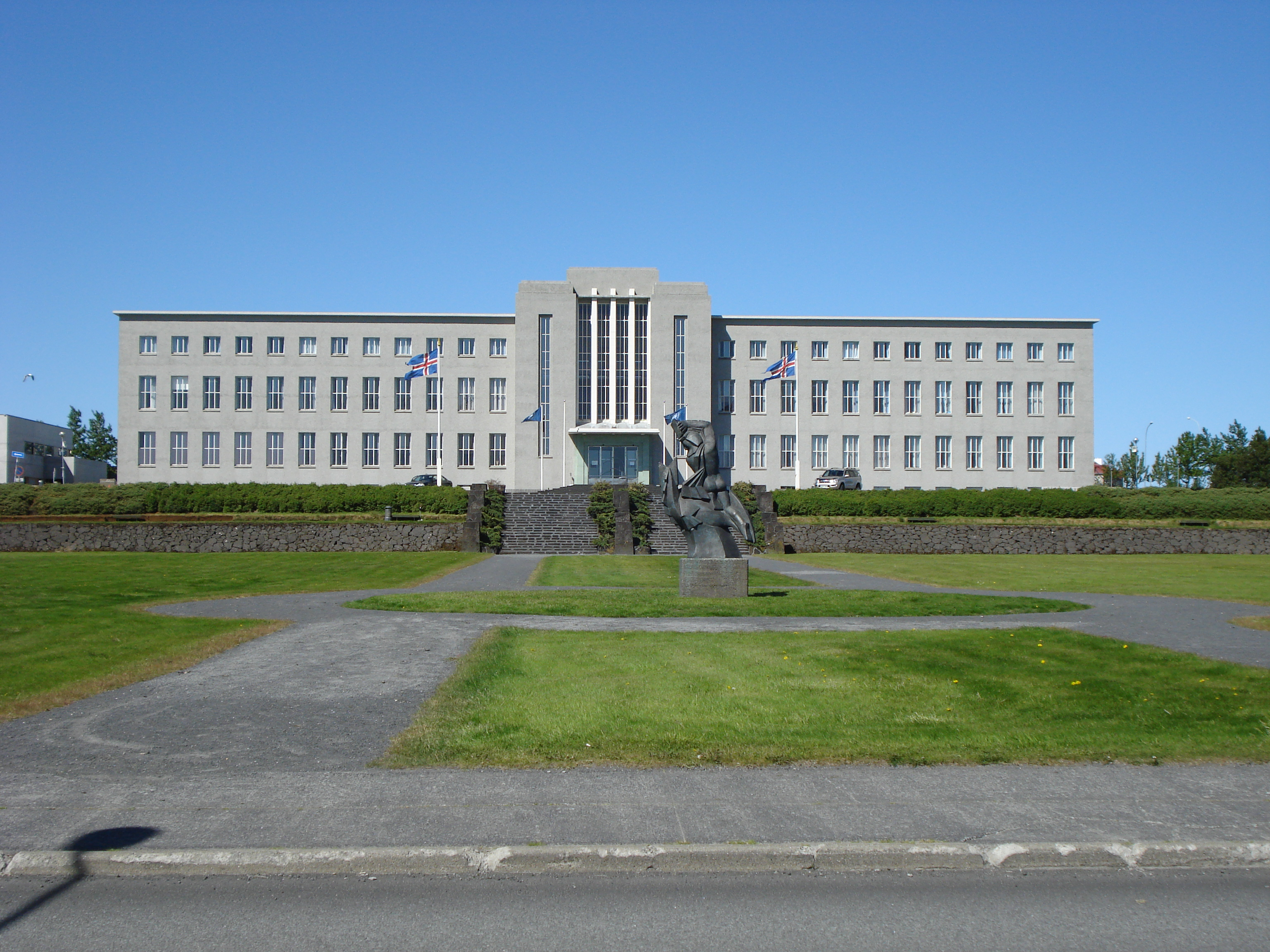
University of Iceland

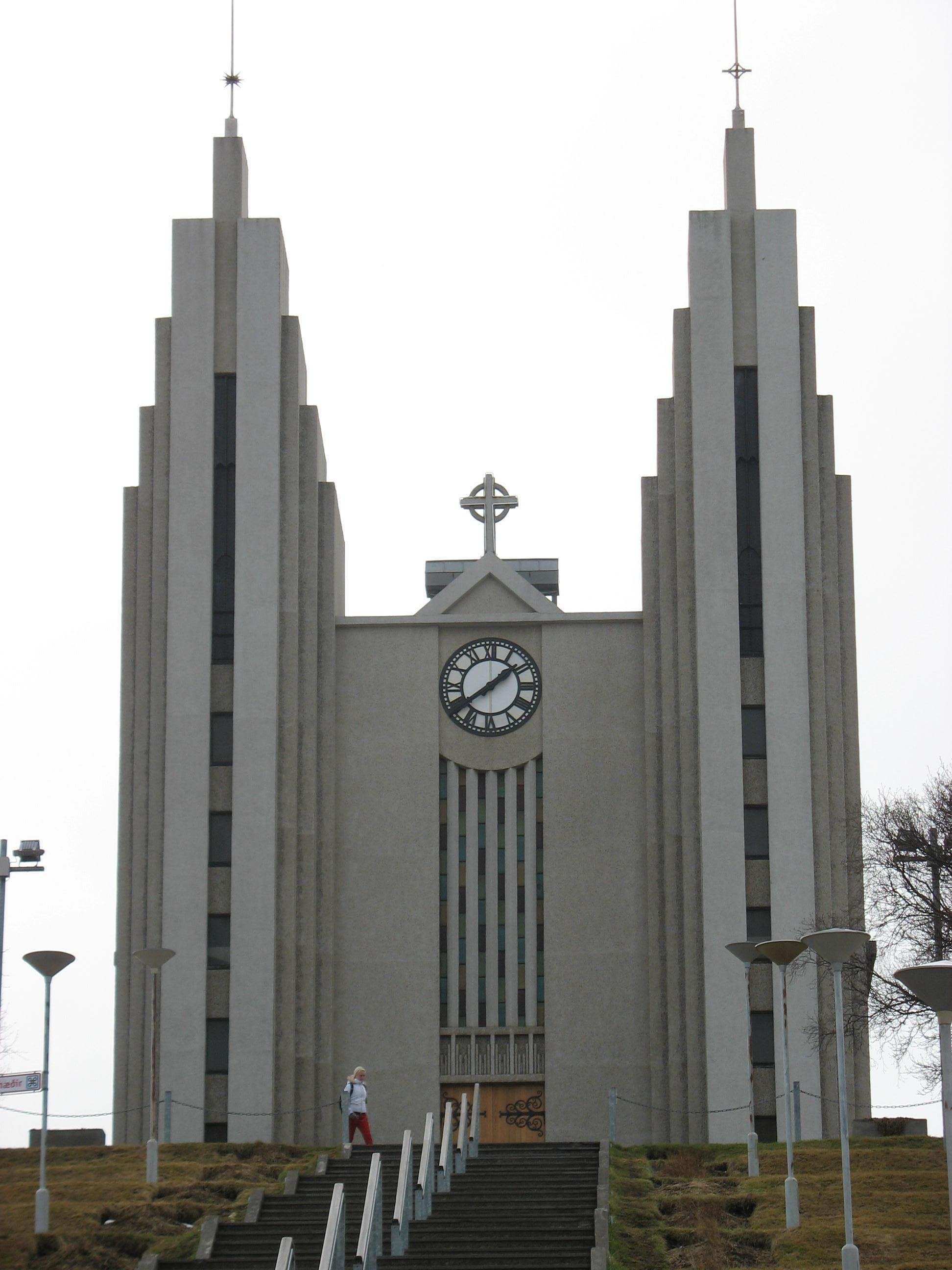
Akureyrarkirkja in Akureyri

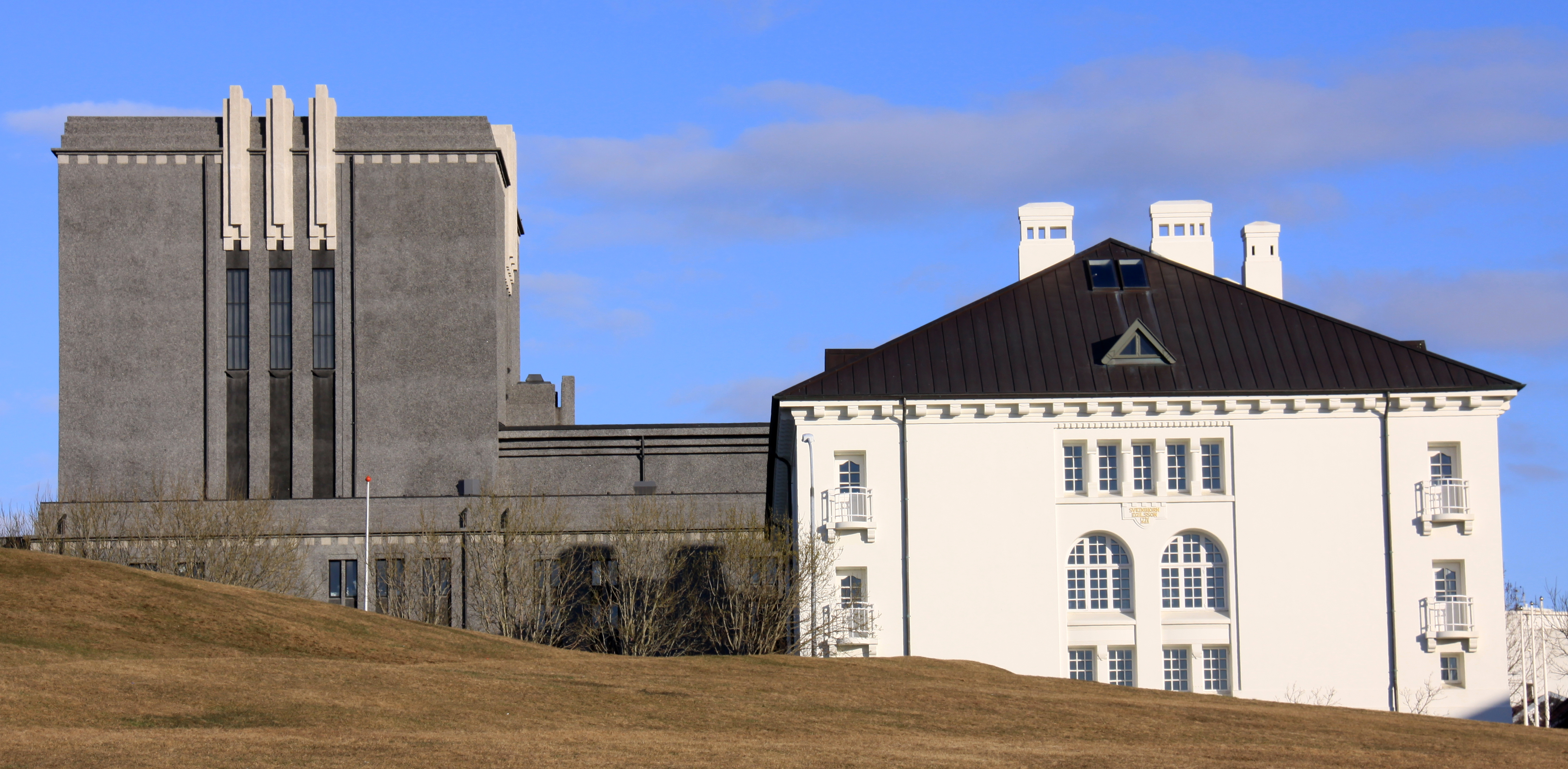
National Theater (Þjóðleikhúsið) from Guðjón Samúelsson and the old Building of the National Library in Reykjavík
