= Hallgrímskirkja =

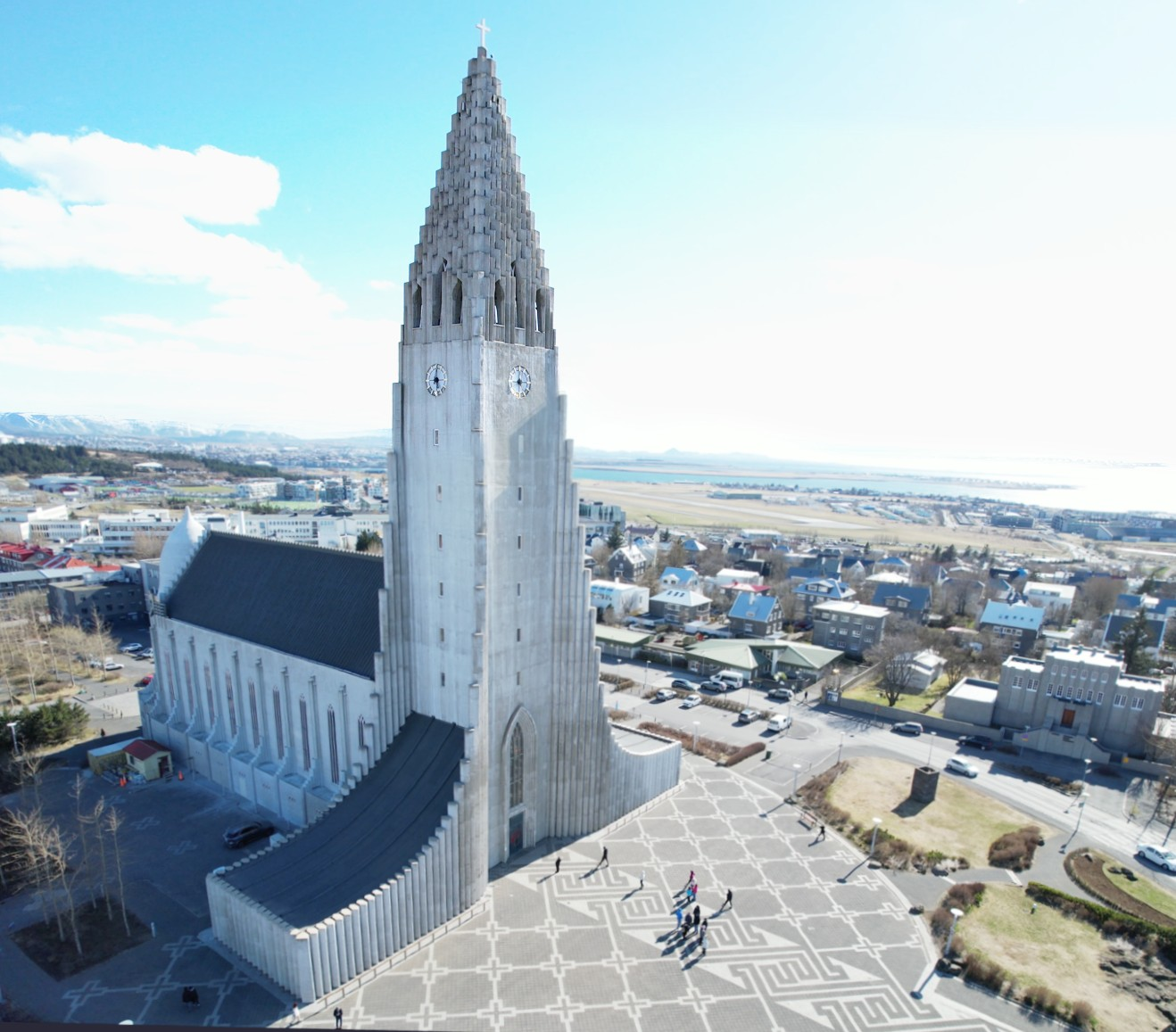
- Hallgrímskirkja
- 64°08′30″N 21°55′36″W
- Country: Iceland
- Denomination: Lutheran
- Website: hallgrimskirkja.is

History
- Status: Active
- Founded: 1945
- Consecrated: 26 October 1986

Architecture
- Functional status: Parish church
- Architect: Guðjón Samúelsson
- Style: Expressionist Neo-Gothic
- Completed: 1986

Administration
- Parish: Reykjavík

Clergy
- Bishop: Agnes M. Sigurðardóttir

Hallgrímskirkja (Icelandic pronunciation: [ˈhatl̥ˌkrimsˌcʰɪr̥ca], Church of Hallgrímur) is a Protestant Lutheran (Church of Iceland) parish church in Reykjavík, Iceland. At 74.5 metres (244 ft) tall, it is the largest church in Iceland and second tallest building in the country. Known for its distinctively curved spire and side wings, it has been described as having become an important symbol for Iceland's national identity since its completion in 1986. The church is named after the Icelandic poet and cleric Hallgrímur Pétursson (1614–1674), author of the Passion Hymns.

== Description ==
Situated on the hilltop Skólavörðuholt [ˈskouːlaˌvœrðʏˌhɔl̥t] near the centre of Reykjavík, the church is one of the city's best-known landmarks and is visible from throughout the city. State Architect Guðjón Samúelsson's design of the church was commissioned in 1937. He is said to have designed it to resemble the trap rocks, mountains and glaciers of Iceland's landscape, in particular its columnar basalt "organ pipe" formations (such as those at Svartifoss). The design is similar in style to the expressionist architecture of Grundtvig's Church (Grundtvigskirken) of Copenhagen, Denmark, completed in 1940, which has been described as a likely influence, alongside the expressionist Kirche am Hohenzollernplatz in Berlin, Germany (completed in 1933).

Architecturally, Hallgrímskirkja consists of three parts: the tower with the distinctly curved side wings which house service facilities, a nave in more traditional architecture, and a sanctuary at the other end of the nave, whose cylindrical shape has been described as evoking Viking war helmets. Hallgrímskirkja also has a 244 ft (74.37 meter) dome.

Hallgrímskirkja is best described as a piece of Expressionist architecture because of its tower-like exterior, its rejection of traditional styles and its dynamic design. It was heavily influenced by the Grundtvigskirken, as noted above. Like Hallgrímskirkja, Grundtvigskirken, has an organ-like appearance.

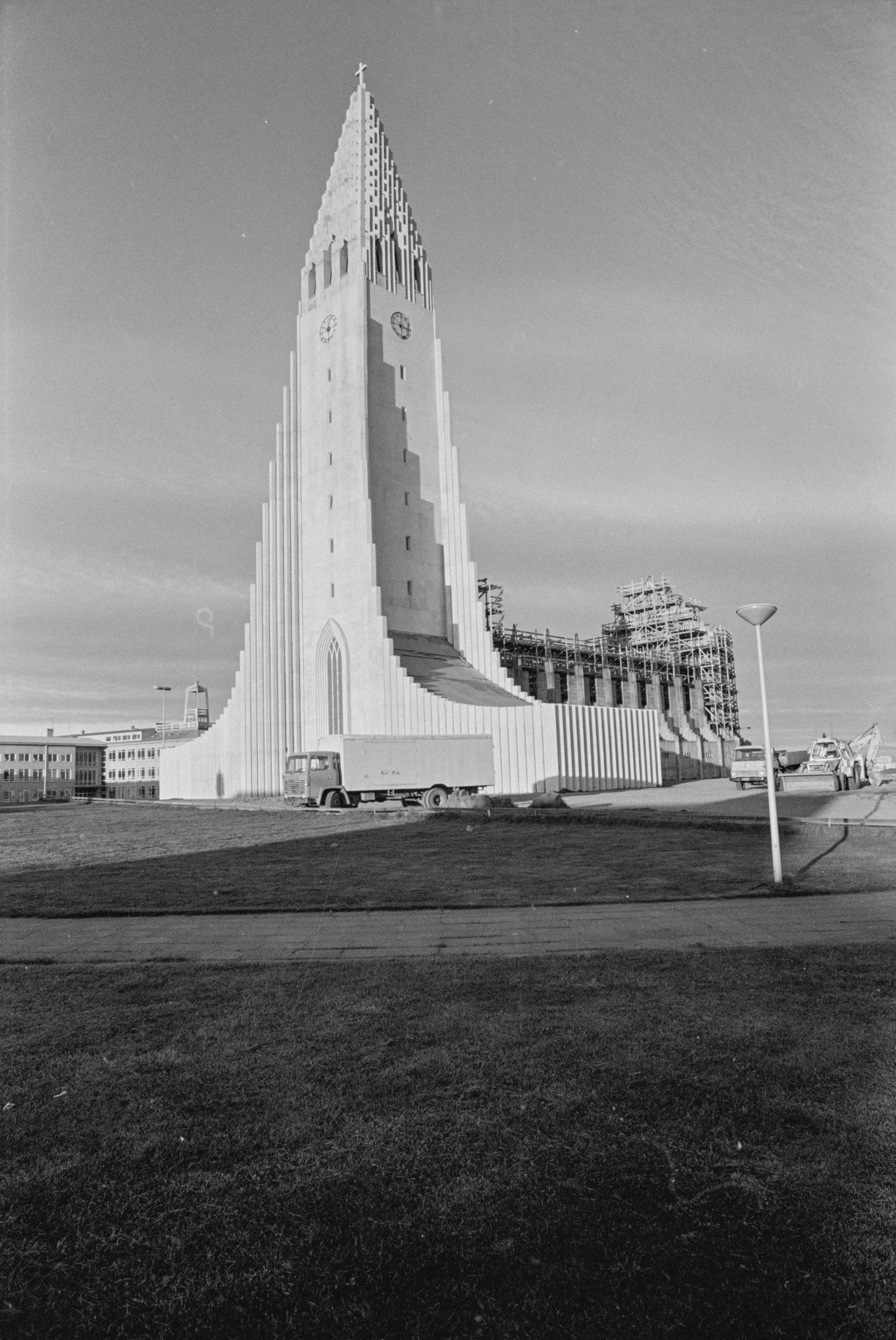
Hallgrímskirkja in 1977 during construction.

It took 41 years to build the church. Construction began in 1945 and ended in 1986, but the landmark tower was completed long before the whole church was finished. The crypt beneath the choir was consecrated in 1948, the steeple and wings were completed in 1974, and the nave was consecrated in 1986. At the time of construction, the building was criticized as too old-fashioned and as a blend of different architectural styles. The church was originally intended to be shorter, but the leaders of the Church of Iceland wanted a large spire to outshine Landakotskirkja (Landakot's Church), which is the cathedral of the Catholic Church in Iceland.

The interior is 1,676 square metres (18,040 sq ft). Einar Jónsson donated the statue of Jesus to the church in 1948, which stands right next to the entrance to the nave. Jesus receives the Holy Spirit after being baptized in the Jordan.

The church is also used as an observation tower, with a lift providing access to the viewing deck with views of Reykjavík and the surrounding mountains.

The statue of explorer Leif Erikson (c.970 – c.1020) by Alexander Stirling Calder in front of the church predates its construction. It was a gift from the United States in honor of the 1930 Althing Millennial Festival, commemorating the 1000th anniversary of the convening of Iceland's parliament at Þingvellir in 930 AD.

== Bells ==
The church has a carillon of 29 bells in the tower. The three largest bells, Hallgrímur, Guðríður, and Steinunn, are named after Hallgrímur, his wife, and their daughter. The carillon is an instrument where bells are played from a keyboard. The bells ring every 15 minutes during the week from 9 AM to 9 PM and on weekends and holidays from noon to 9 PM, when the Protestant services are not held. The largest bell, Hallgrímur, also rings on the hour.

== Organ ==
The church houses two large pipe organs. The first, a Rieger-Kloss organ was installed in 1946. It was moved to the South Wing when it opened and a new organ was built. The next pipe organ was commissioned from Frobenius in 1985. Soon after, in 1988 the church council decided that the Frobenius pipe organ wasn't big enough and commissioned another from the German organ builder Johannes Klais of Bonn. It has electronic action; the pipes are remote from the four manuals and pedal console. There are 102 ranks, 72 stops and 5275 pipes. It is 15 metres (49 ft) tall and weighs 25 metric tons (25 long tons; 28 short tons). Its construction was finished in December 1992.

== Gallery ==
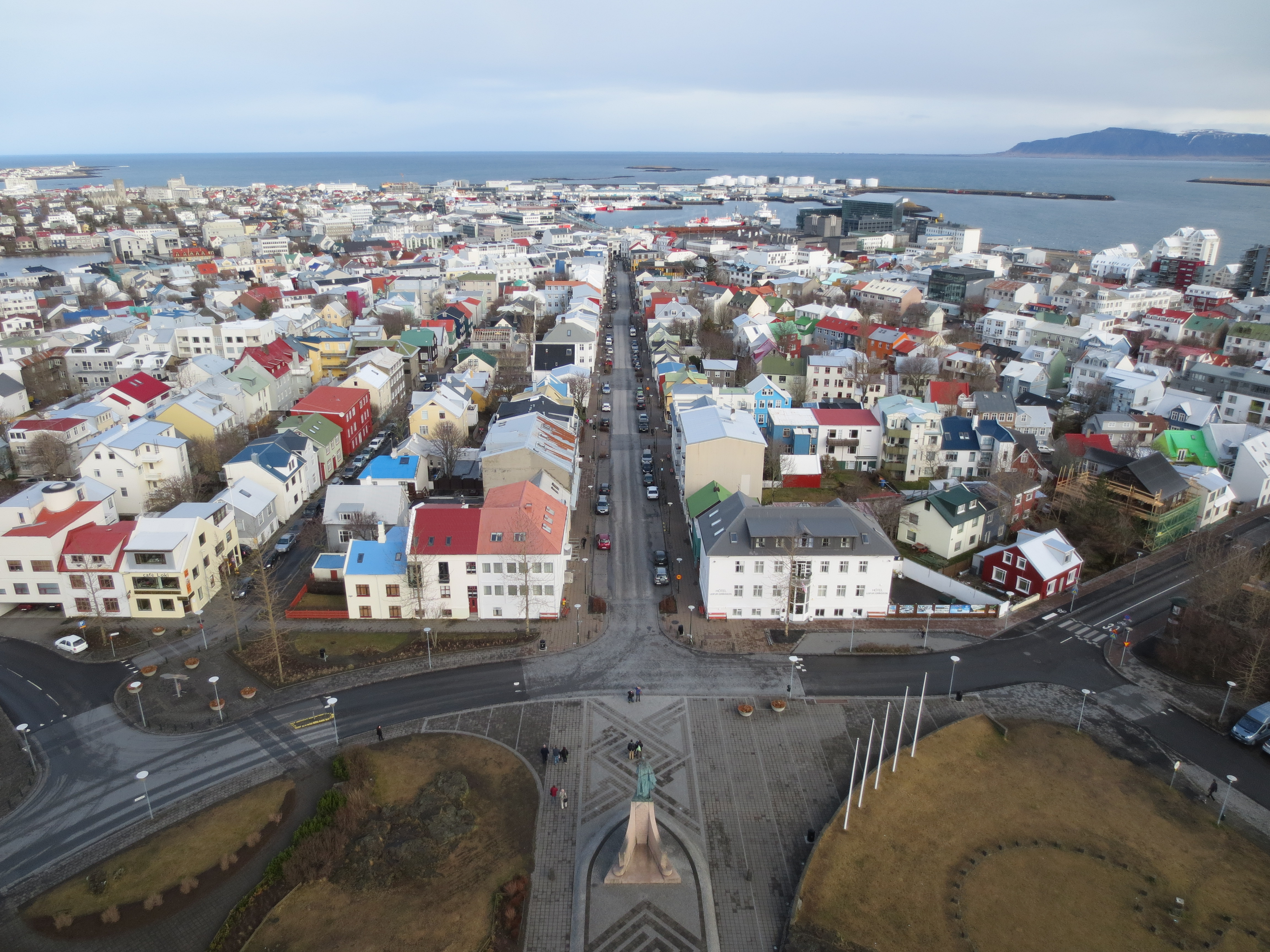
View north from the top of Hallgrímskirkja

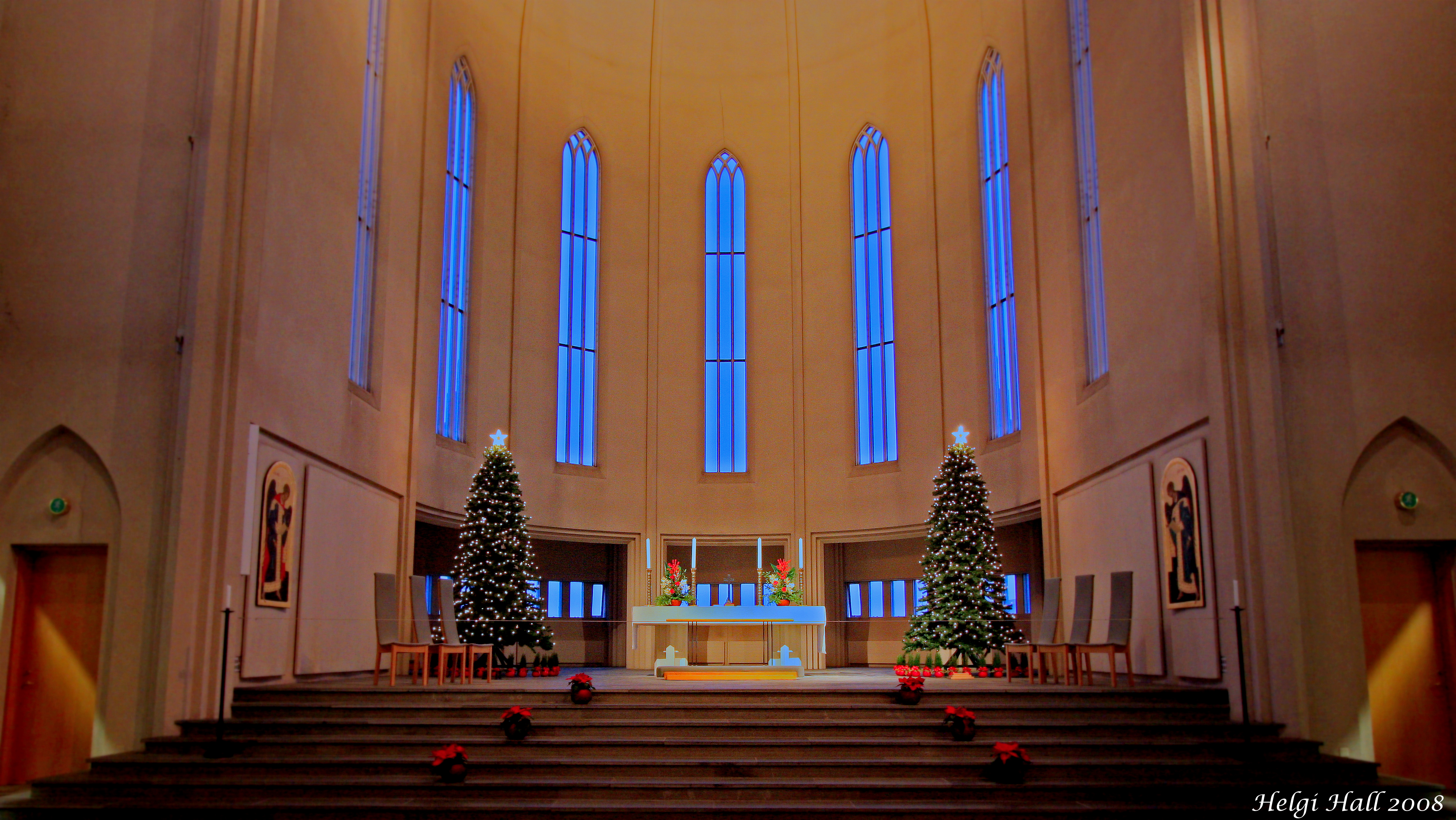
Chancel of Hallgrimskirkja

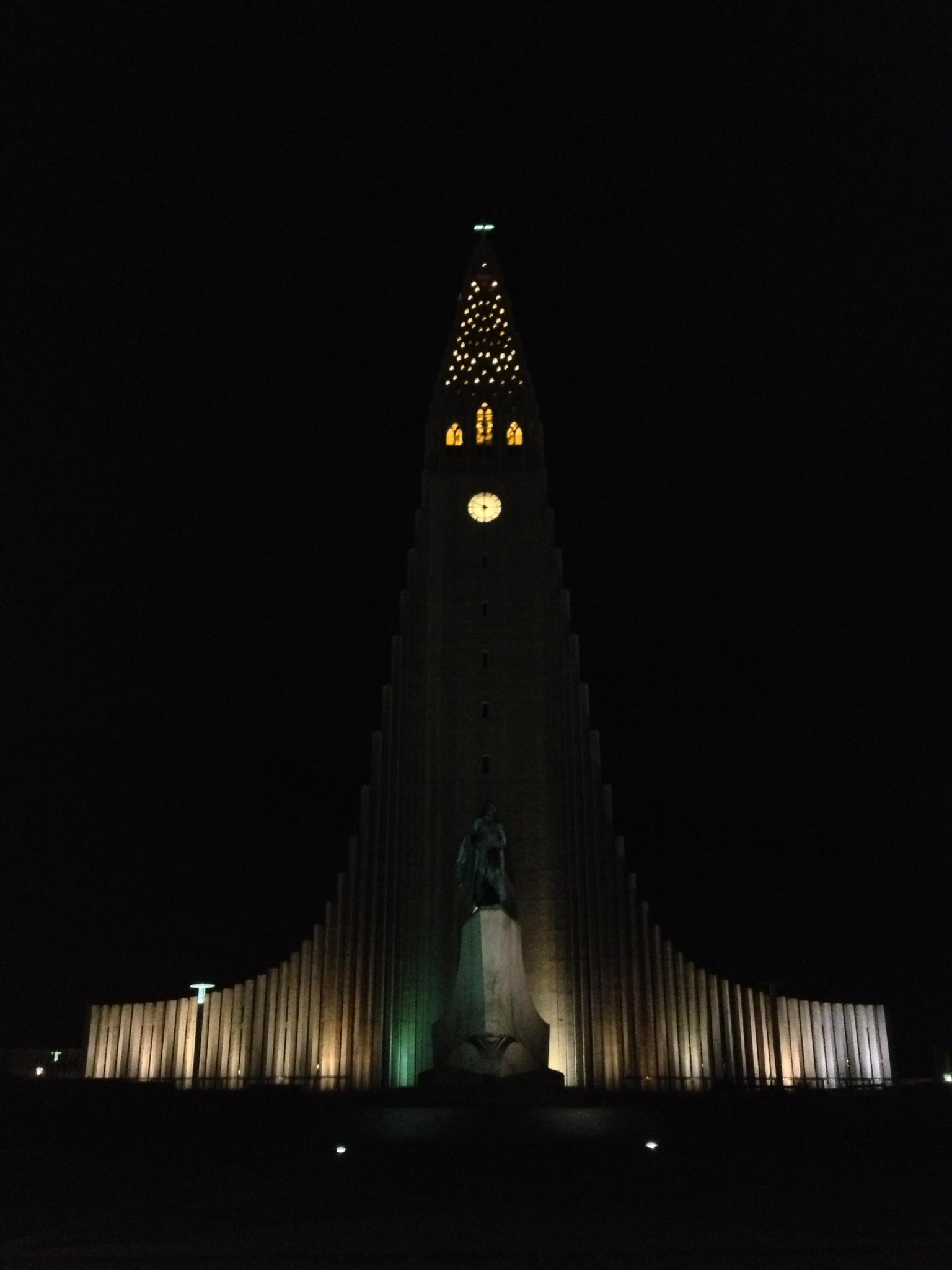
Hallgrímskirkja at night

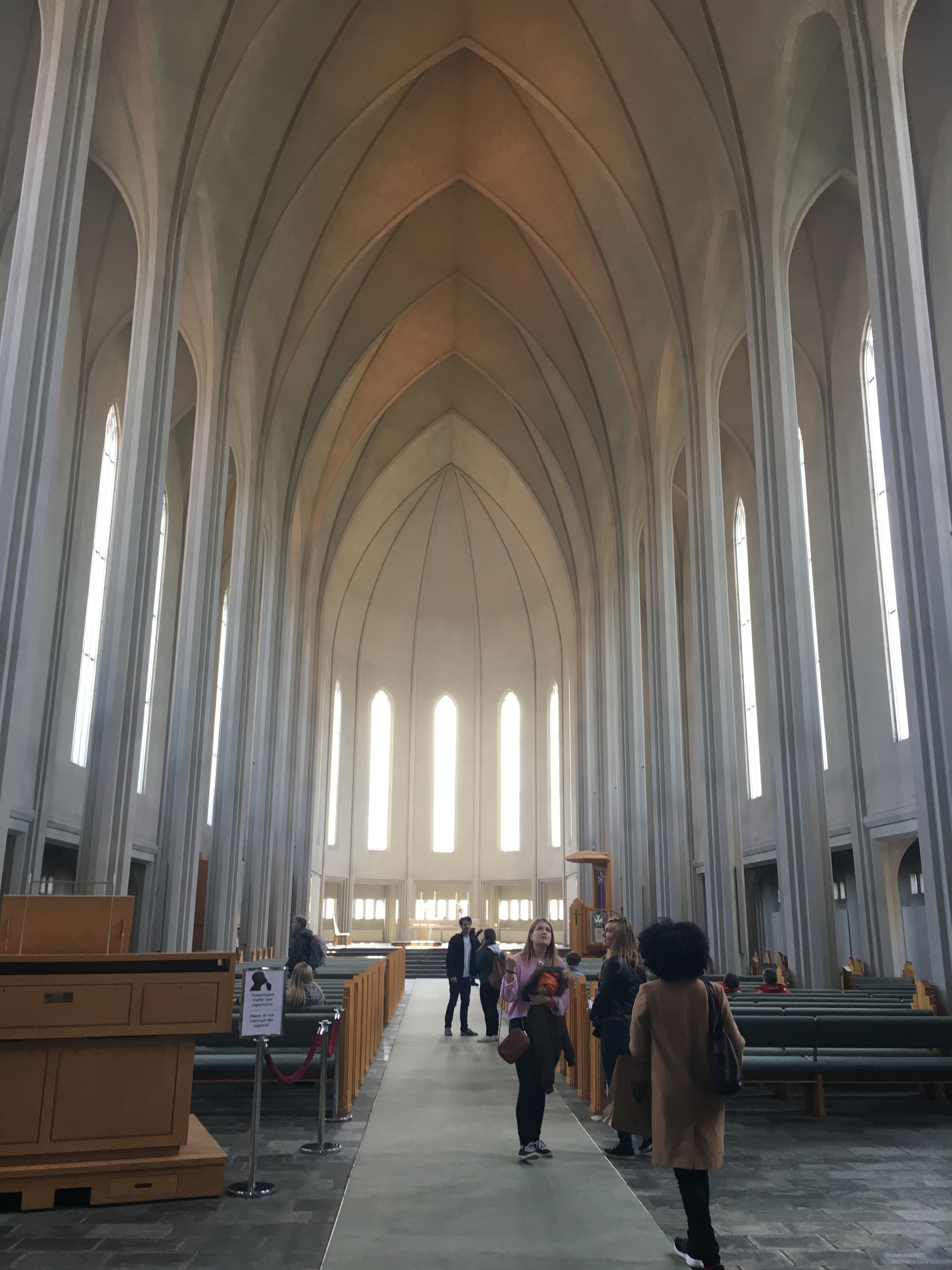
Nave of Hallgrimskirkja

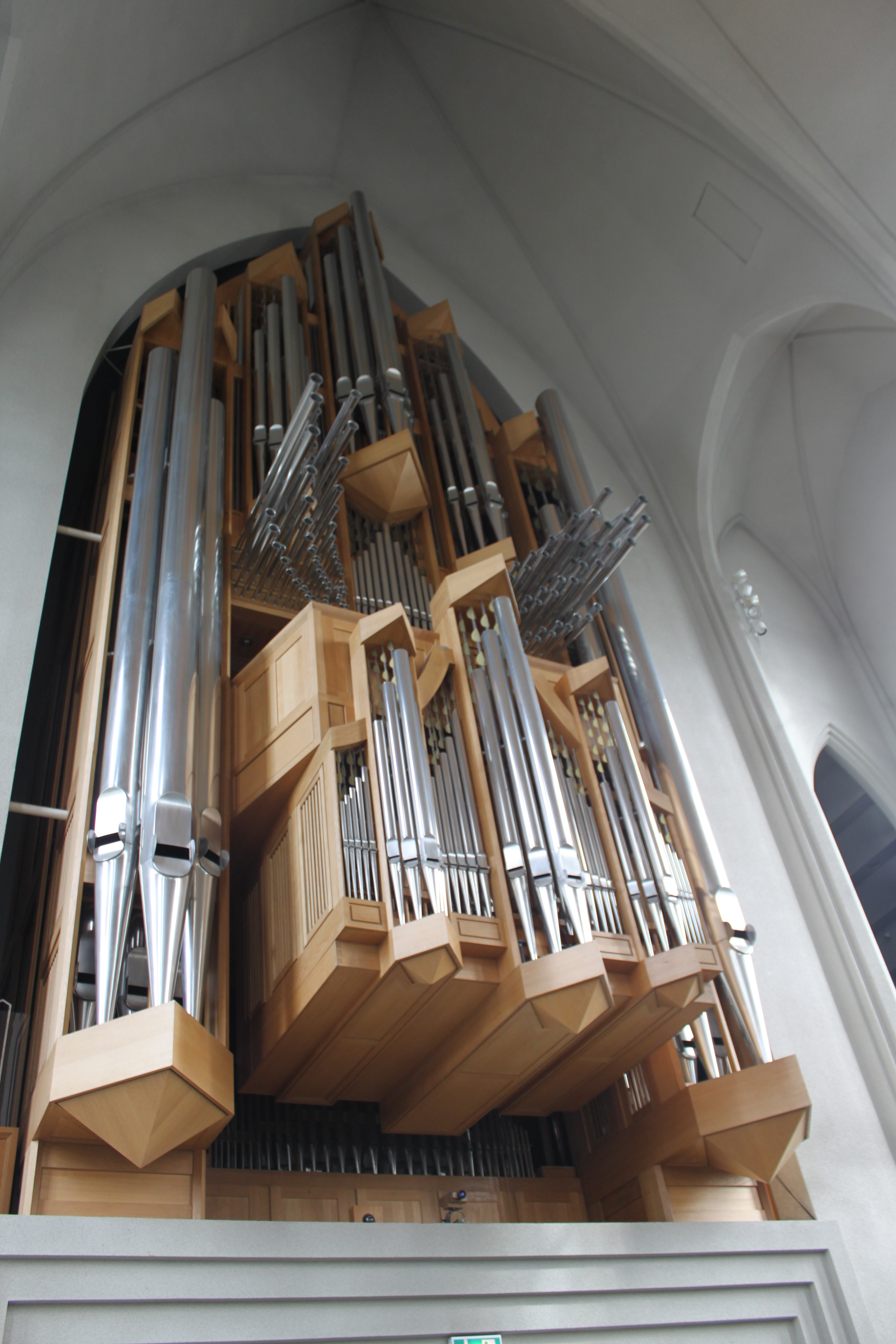
The pipe organ

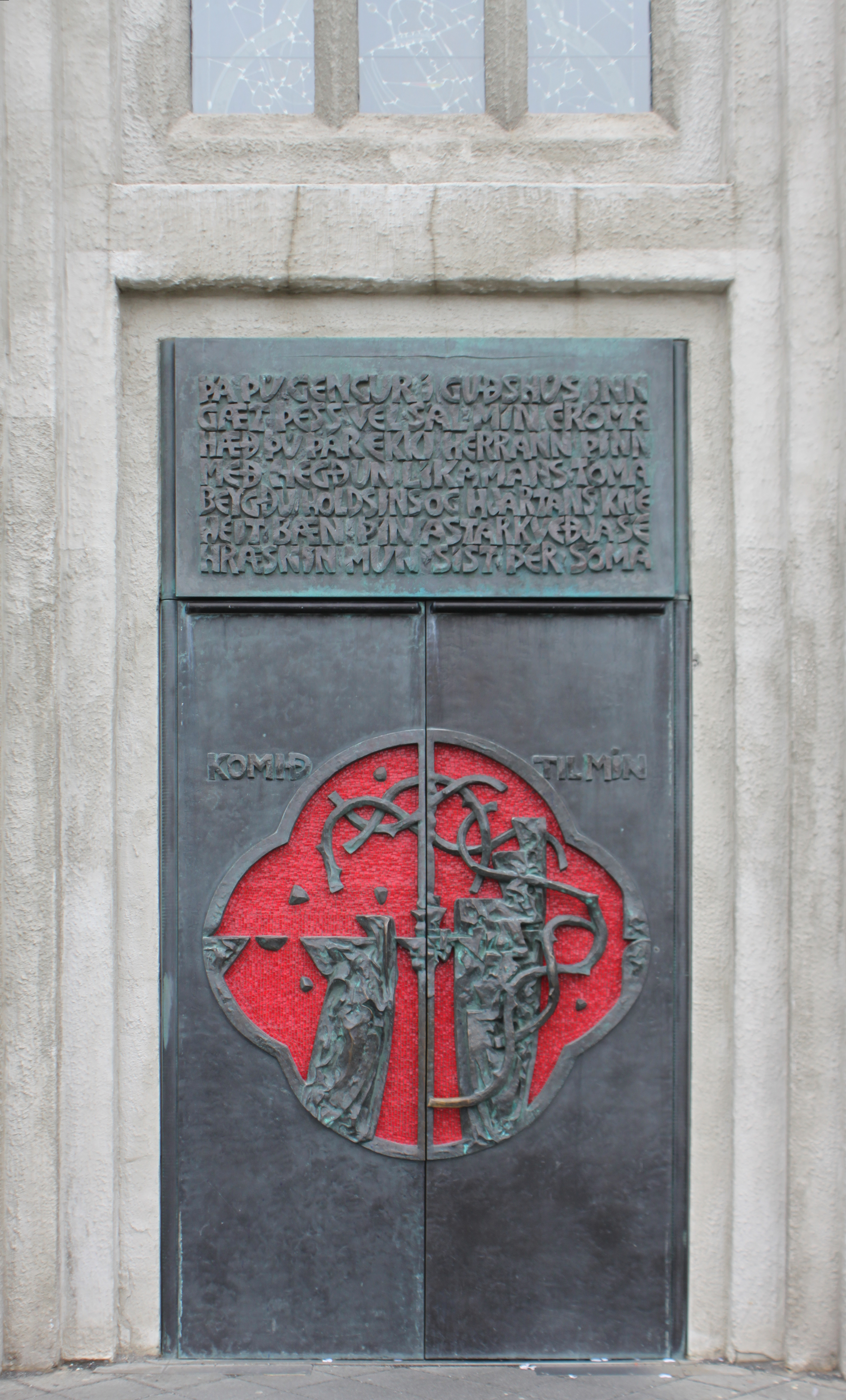
Main door

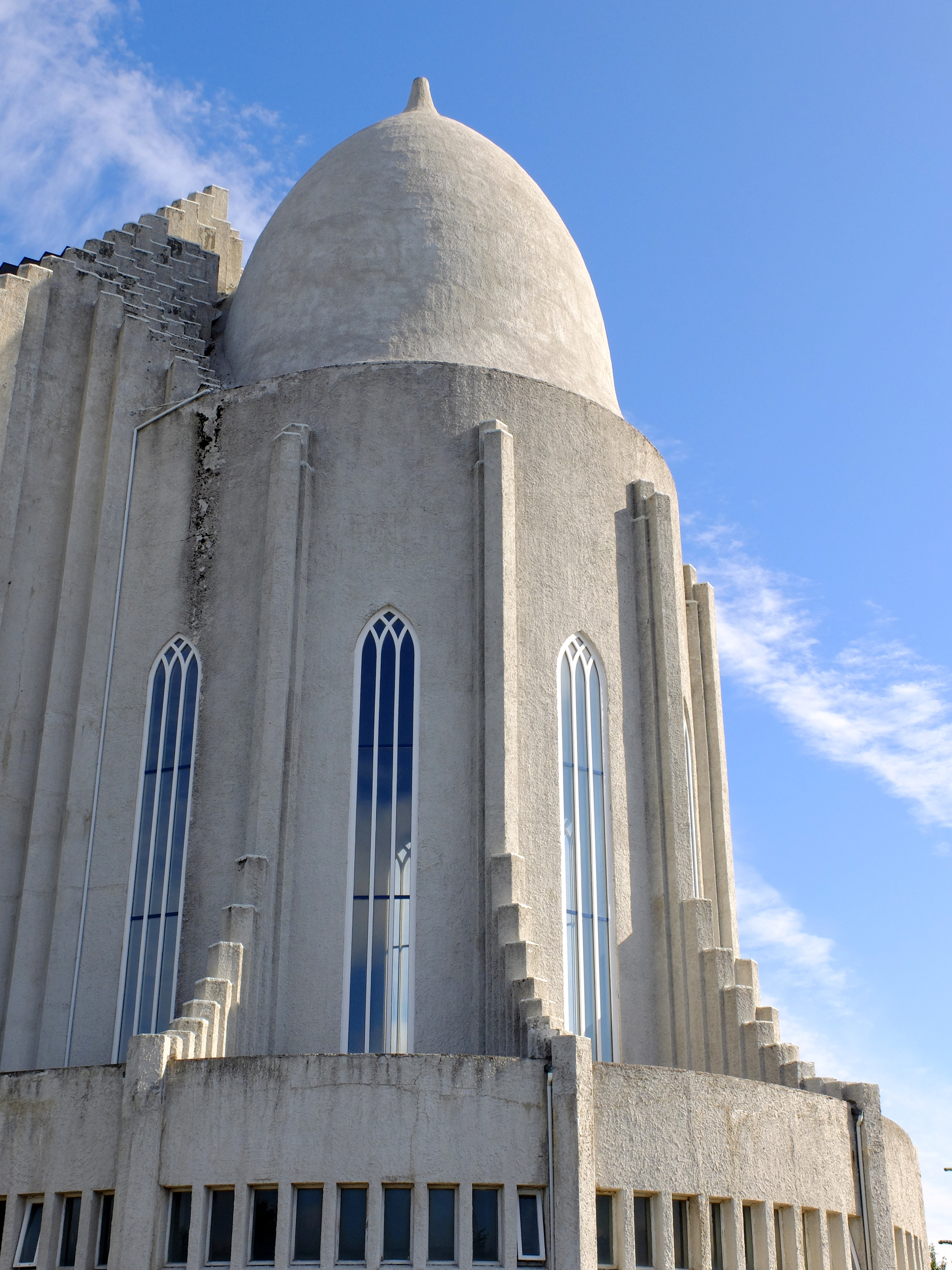
Sanctuary

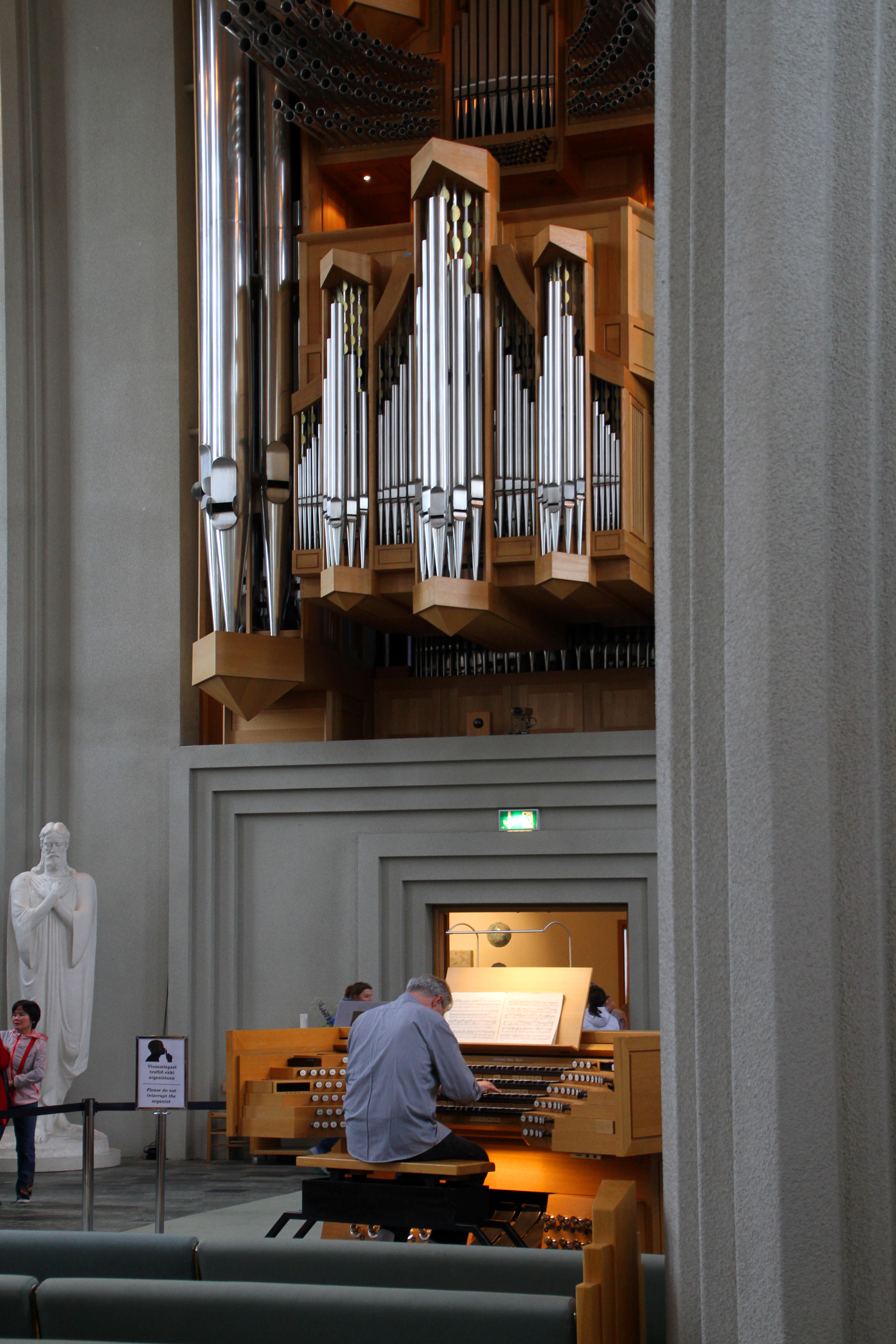
Jesus statue and the organ with organist Solbergsson (2018)

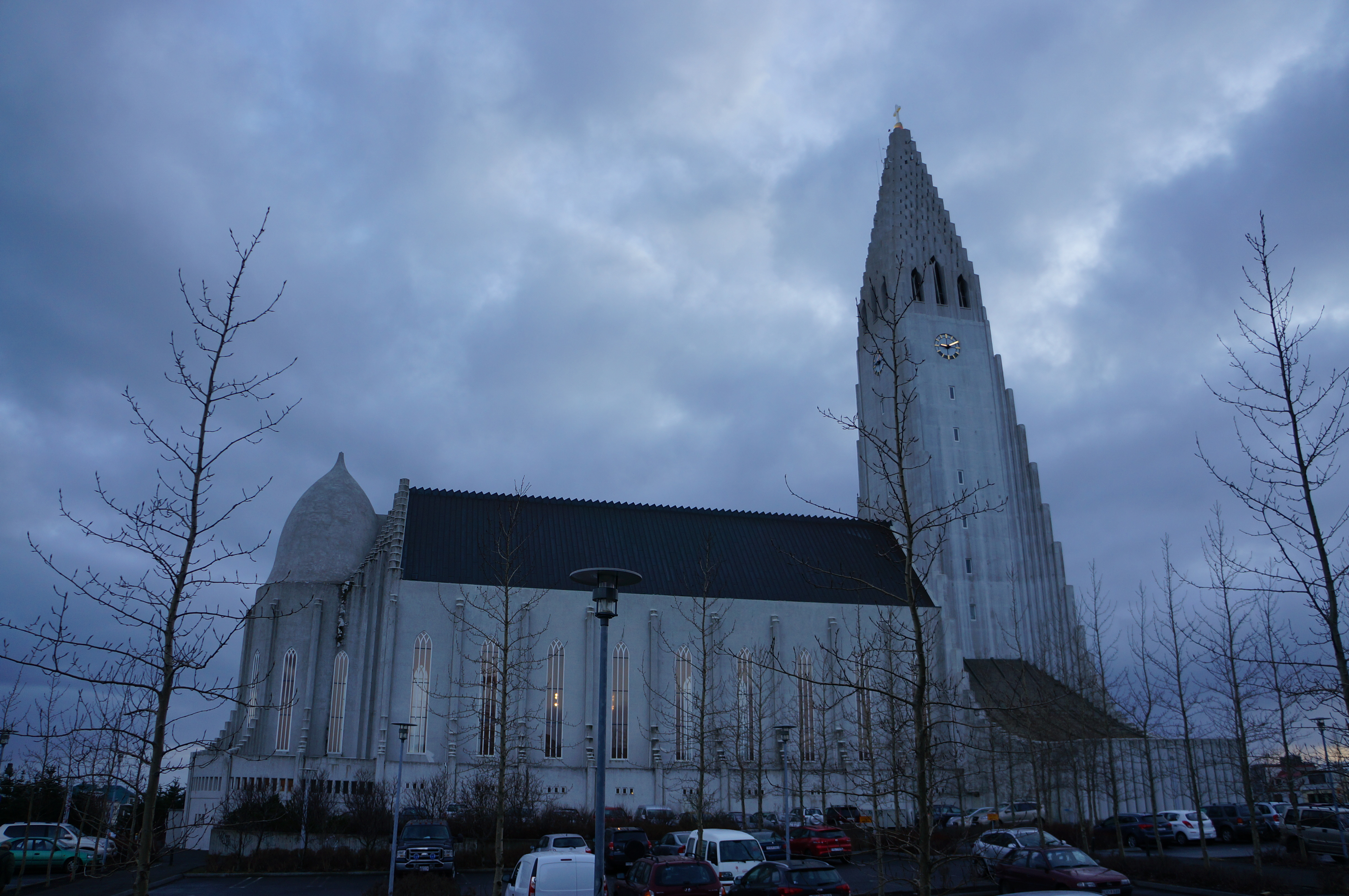
Side view of Hallgrímskirkja at night

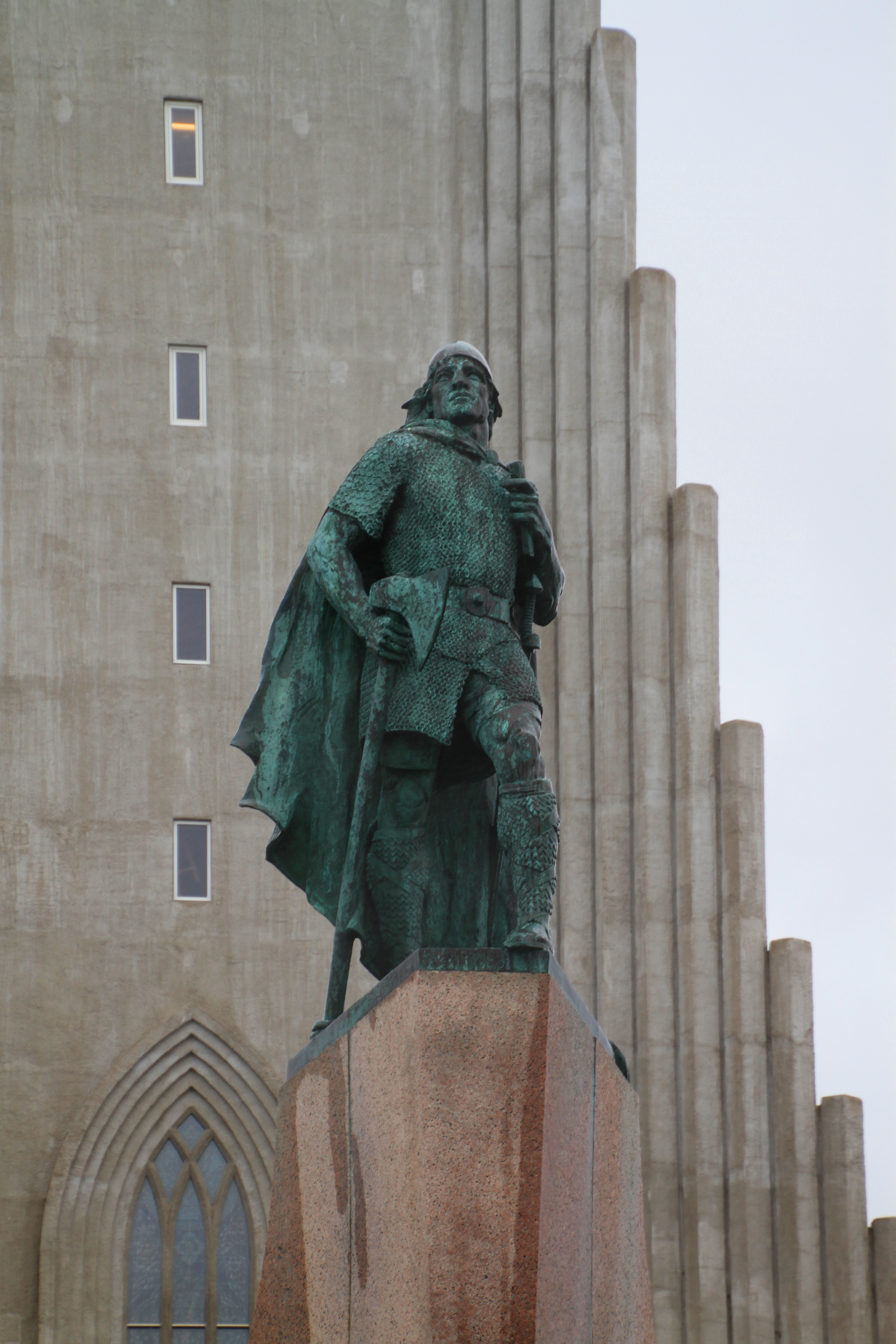
Statue of Leif Erikson
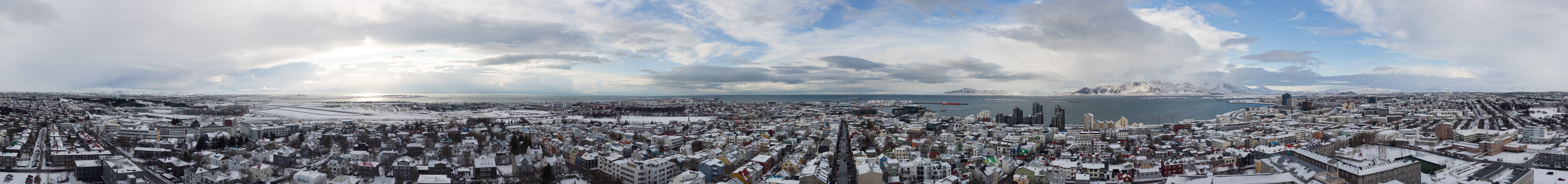
Panoramic view from the top of the Hallgrímskirkja
