= Reykjavík City Center =

Coordinates: 64°08′25″N 21°55′58″W

City Center Miðborg
- District
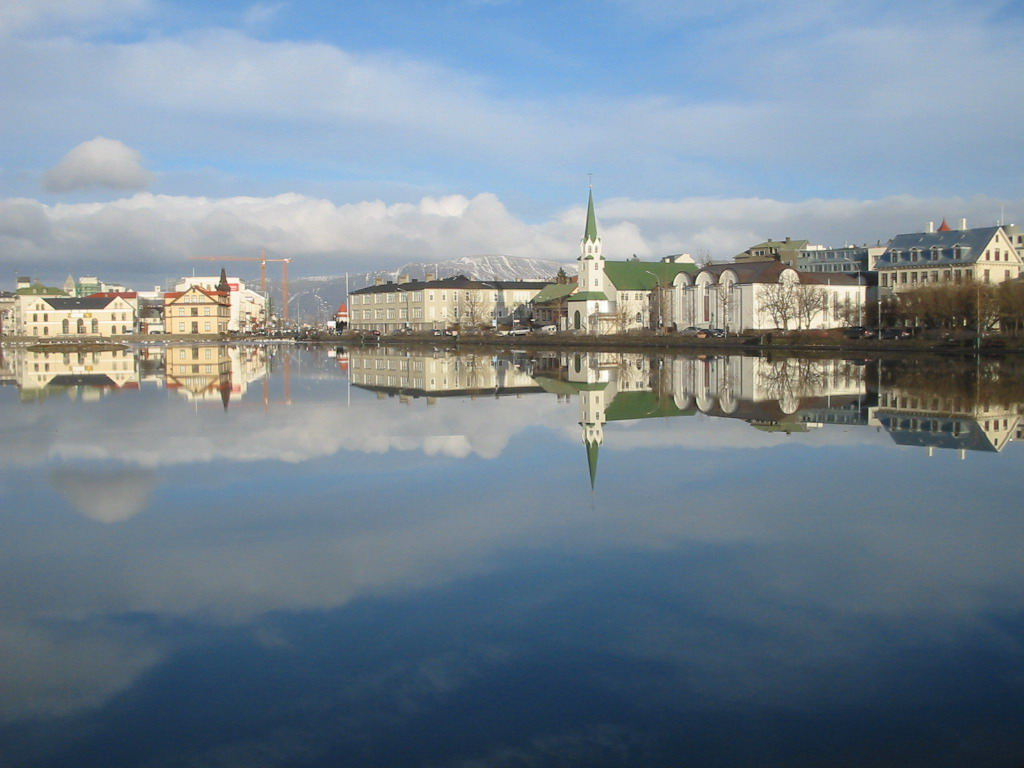
- Tjörnin

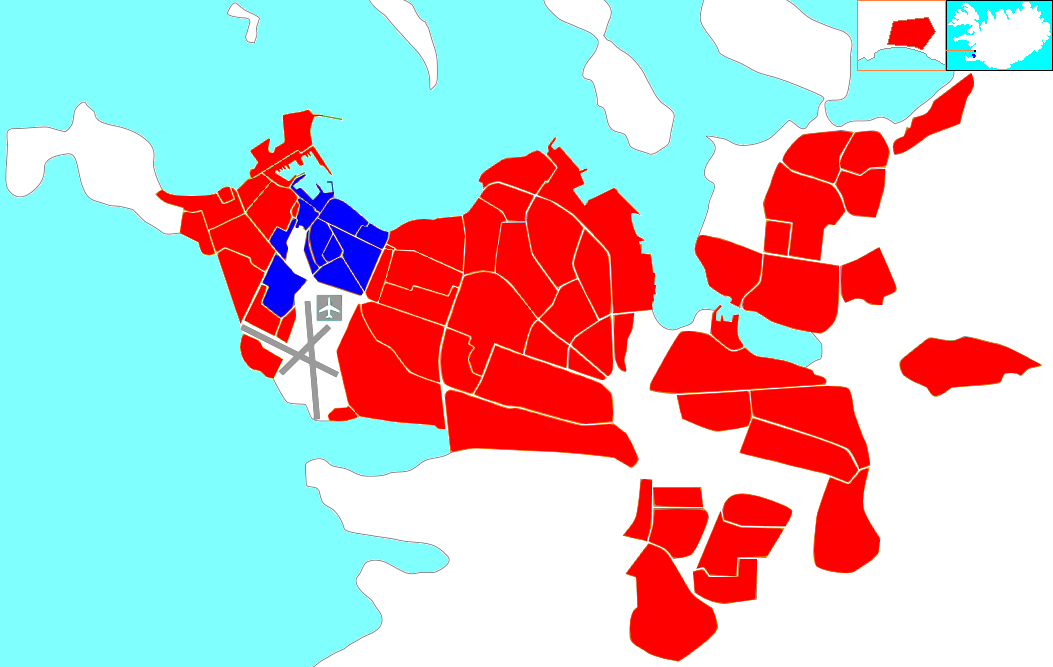
- Country: Iceland
- Municipality: Reykjavík

Area
  - Total: 3.6 km^{2} (1.4 sq mi)

Population (2010)
  - Total: 8,600
  - Density: 2,400/km^{2} (6,200/sq mi)
- Postal code: IS-101

Reykjavík City Center (Icelandic: Miðborg [ˈmɪðˌpɔrk], Miðbær [ˈmɪðˌpaiːr̥], and sometimes Austurbær [ˈœystʏrˌpaiːr̥]) is a sub-municipal administrational district that covers much of the central part Reykjavík, the capital of Iceland. The district includes six neighbourhoods: Kvos [ˈkʰvɔːs], Grjótaþorp [ˈkrjouːtaˌθɔr̥p], Skólavörðuholt [ˈskouːlaˌvœrðʏˌhɔl̥t], Þingholt [ˈθiŋkˌhɔl̥t], Skuggahverfi [ˈskʏkːaˌkʰvɛrvɪ] and Vatnsmýri [ˈvasːˌmiːrɪ].

== Overview ==
It is the administrative center of Iceland, containing Alþingishúsið (the national parliament buildings), Stjórnarráðshúsið [ˈstjou(r)tnarˌrauðsˌhuːsɪθ] (the cabinet house), the Supreme Court of Iceland and the town hall. In addition, the area is home to many of the city's landmarks, including Tjörnin (The Pond), Harpa and Hallgrímskirkja, the largest church in Iceland; tourist flow is considerable. The city center is also the center of Reykjavík's nightlife; many of the city's bars and nightclubs are located in Austurstræti (East Street) and Bankastræti (Bank Street).

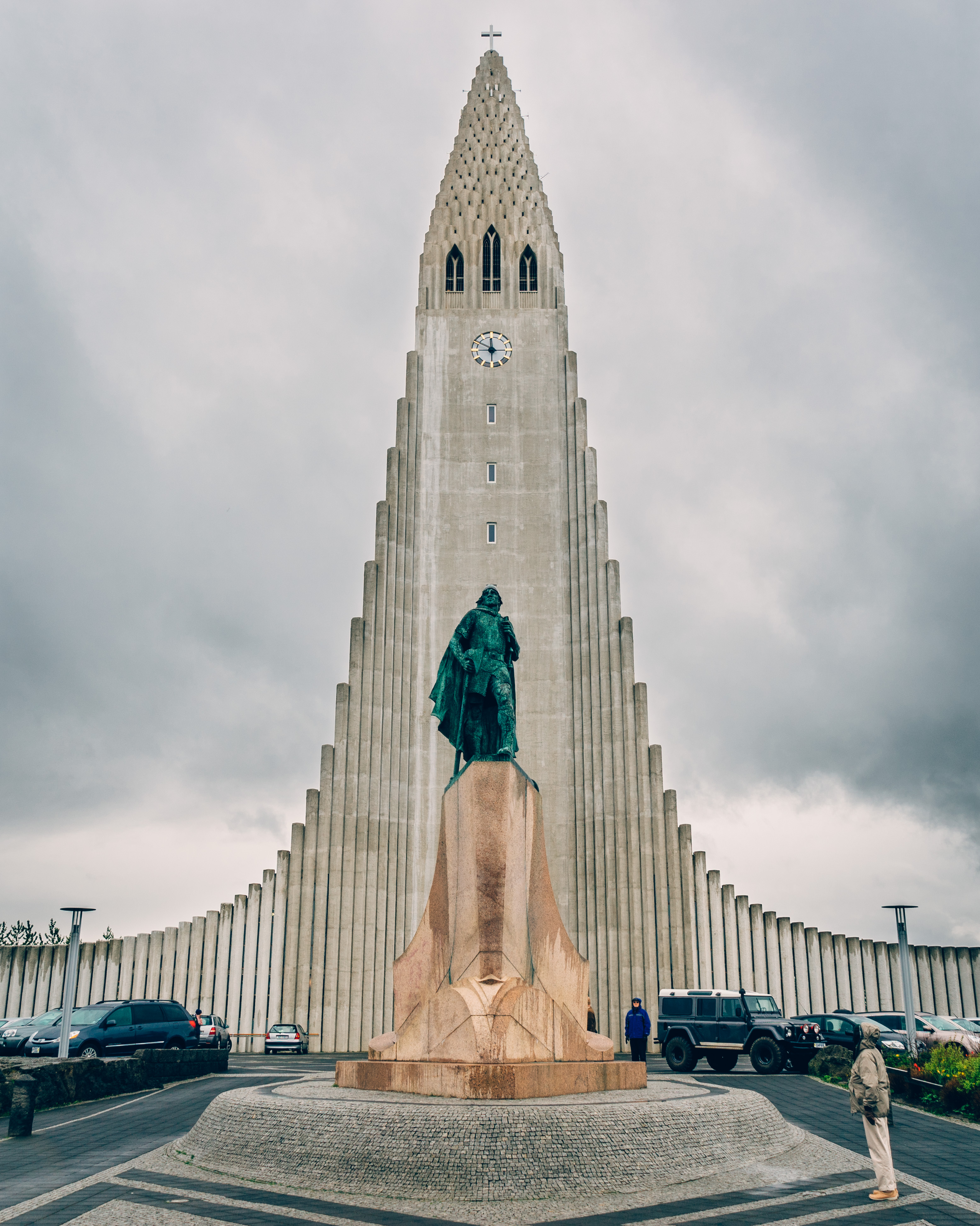
Hallgrímskirkja
