= Icelandic Punk Museum =

Music history museum in Iceland

- Pönksafn Íslands
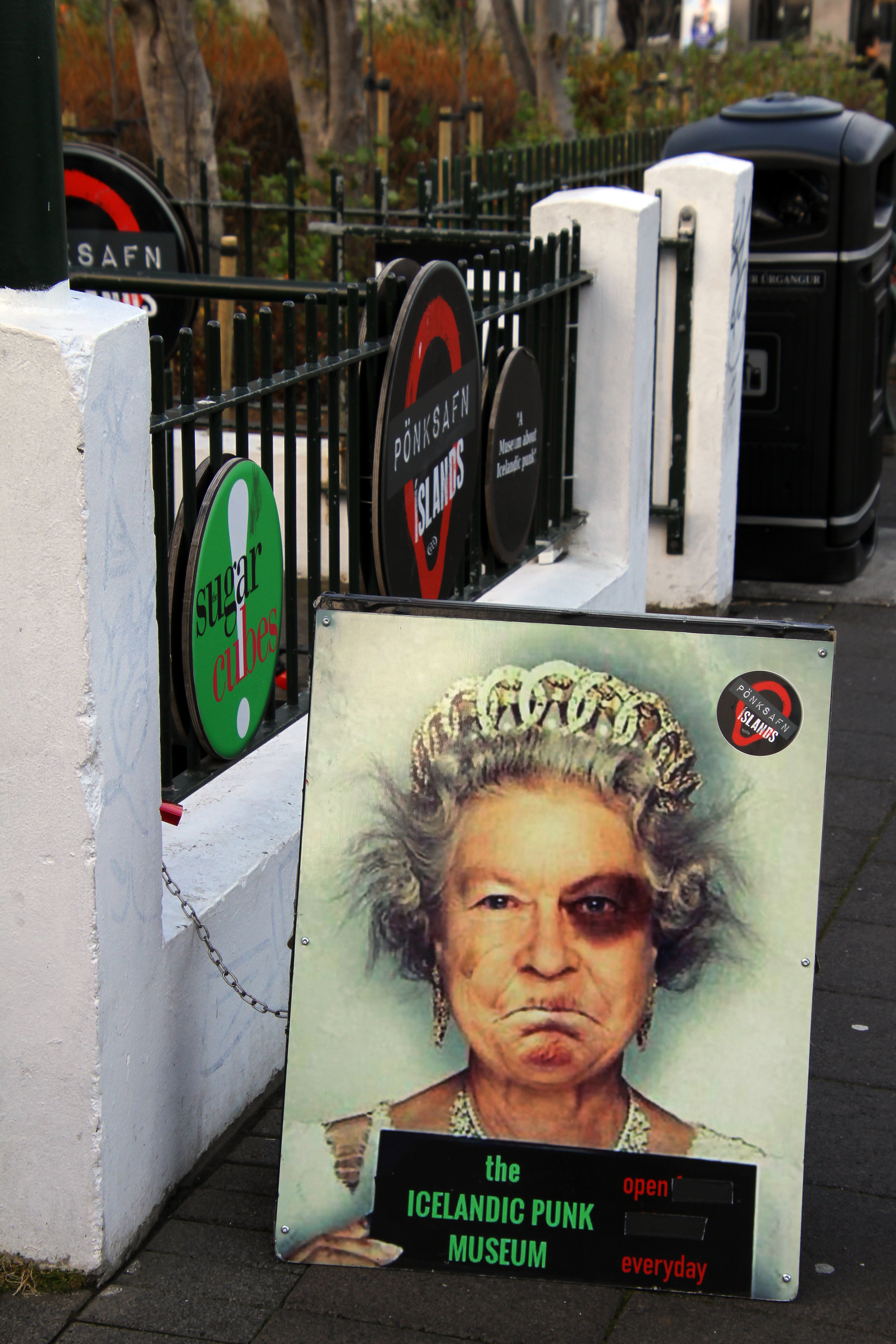
- The entrance to the museum on Bankastræti.
- Interactive fullscreen map
- Established: November 11, 2016
- Location: Bankastræti 0, Reykjavík, Iceland
- Coordinates: 64.147028°N 21.935909°W
- Type: Music museum
- Curator: Svarti Álfur
- Public transit access: Lækjartorg B, Strætó

The Icelandic Punk Museum (Icelandic: Pönksafn Íslands) is a music history museum in Reykjavík. The museum preserves and details the history of punk rock music, particularly the first 15 years of its development in Iceland after 1978. The entirety of the museum is housed underground in a disused men's public toilet on Bankastræti.

== History ==
The public toilet the museum is housed in operated from 1930 to 2000. Because of its proximity to the large group of pubs on Austurstræti, it was so commonly visited, that it received a colloquial name, Núllið ("The Zero"), referring to its street address, Bankastræti 0.

After sitting vacant for 16 years, it was opened in 2016 by a group of mostly anonymous Icelandic punk musicians and enthusiasts. Since then, it has remained a popular tourist destination due to its prominent and unusual location.

The museum's grand opening was hosted by Sex Pistols lead vocalist John Lydon, and the museum's curator, Svarti Álfur Mánason, an Icelandic punk musician.

== Design ==
The museum features a one-way layout, where visitors are guided through the different exhibits, which are organized chronologically to tell the story of punk in Iceland.

The aesthetic of the museum reflects the DIY punk ethic, with the walls designed to look like a scrapbook. Punk clothing, instruments, video monitors, duct tape, newspaper clippings, fake house plants, banners, and polaroid photos cover almost every available surface.

== Punk in Iceland ==
Punk, as a subculture, emerged in North America, the United Kingdom, and Australia in the early 1970's, and quickly spread throughout Europe. Punk in Iceland is cited as beginning in 1978 with the formation of the band Fræbbblarnir, and the museum ends its narrative in 1992 with the disbanding of The Sugarcubes.
