= Bernhöftstorfan =

Coordinates: 64.1468°N 21.9362°W

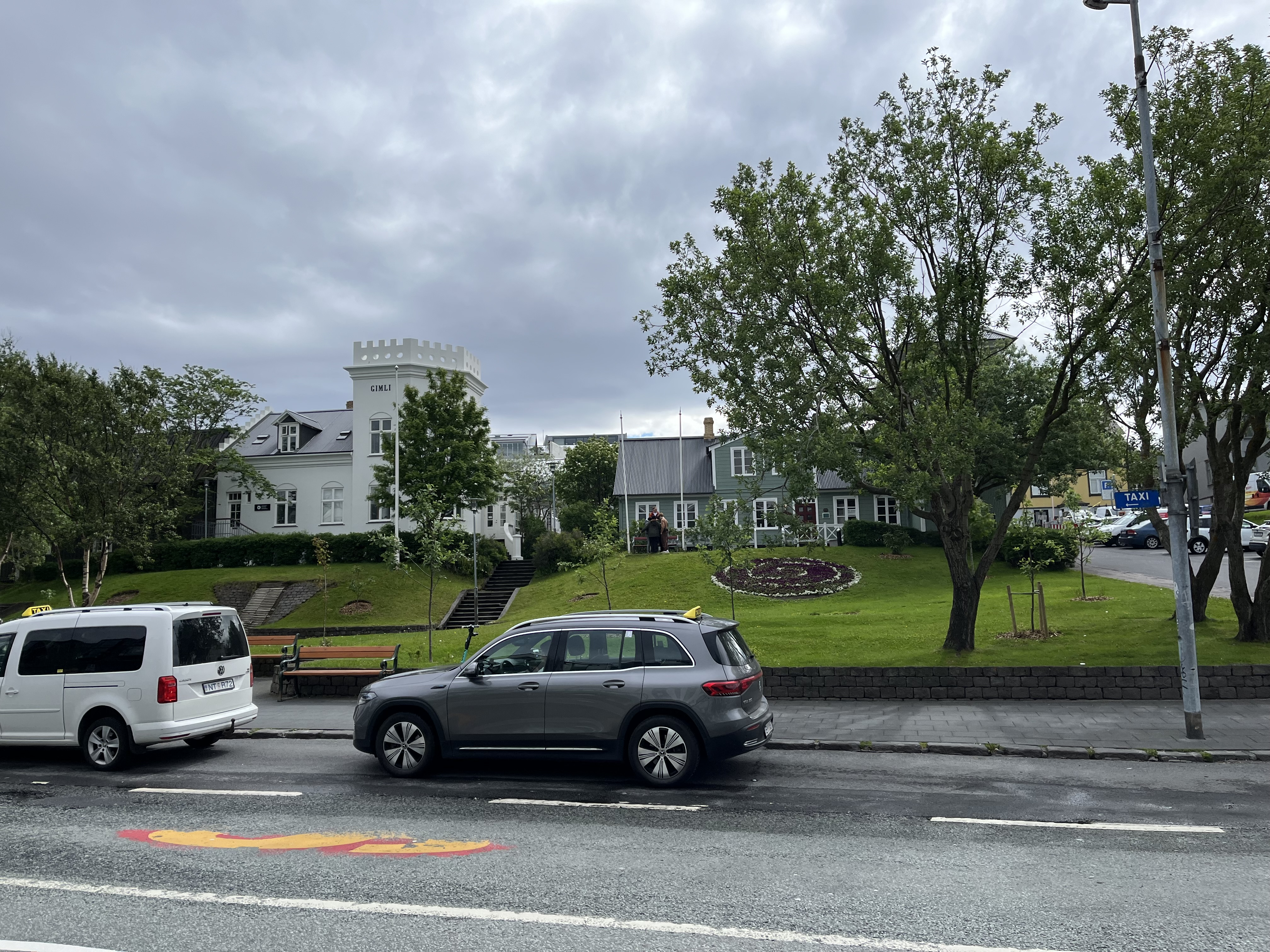
Bernhöftstorfan

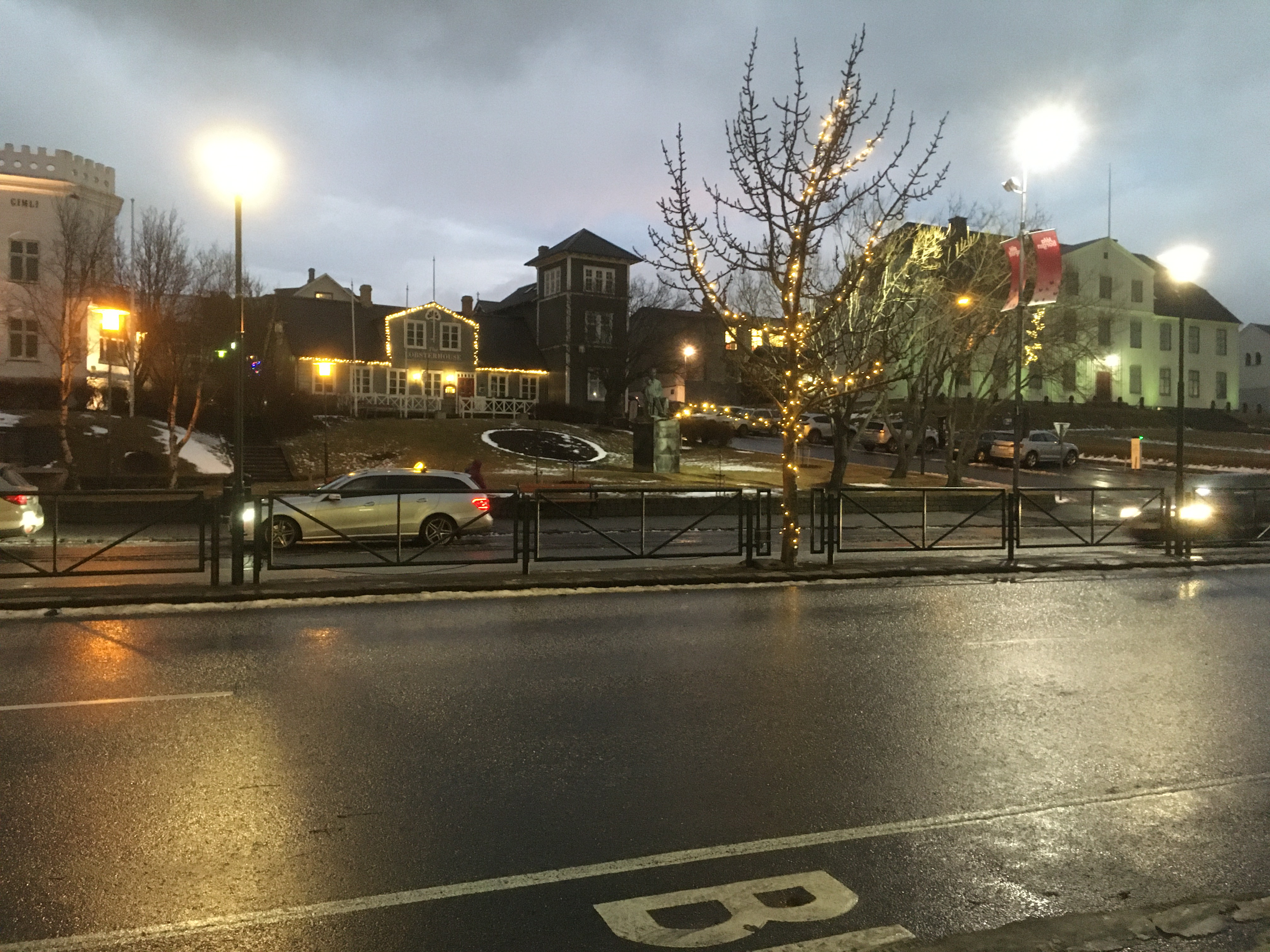
Bernhöftstorfan (left side) and the Reykjavik Junior College

Bernhöftstorfan is a row of houses in central Reykjavík that faces Lækjargata in one direction and Skólastræti in another. The oldest houses in the row were built in 1834 for Bernhöftsbakarí Icelands oldest Bakery.

The row of houses was controversial in the history of urban planning in Reykjavík, as there heated disputes in the 1970s as to whether the row should be demolished or protected and restored. The row of houses was given heritage preservation status in 1979.
