= Guide to Iceland =

Travel and holiday companies of Iceland

Guide to Iceland ehf.
- Logo used from 2012
- Type: Private
- Industry: Travel, tourism
- Founded: 2012
- Headquarters: Katrínartún 4, Reykjavík, Iceland
- Area served: Iceland
- Number of employees: 140 (2024)
- Subsidiaries: Travelshift
- Website: guidetoiceland.is

Guide to Iceland is an online platform for Iceland tourism and the most popular travel website about Iceland. It was chosen as Iceland's Leading Travel Agency four years in a row at the World Travel Awards.

== History ==
Guide to Iceland was founded in 2012. The founders wanted to create a central marketplace for tourism in Iceland, where travelers could find reliable travel information and book directly from local suppliers. The website was started in January 2013 and the online platform was officially launched in 2014.

By 2016, there were more than 500 companies using the platform. In 2021, more than 1900 suppliers in Iceland were listed on Guide to Iceland.

In January 2017, the City of Reykjavík chose Guide to Iceland as its Official Tourist Information Partner. The award coincided with the relocation of Reykjavik's main Tourist Information Center to Reykjavík City Hall, where it was operated by Guide to Iceland.

In 2018 the U.S.-based General Electrics Pension Trust invested in Guide to Iceland through State Street Global Advisors, becoming the second-largest shareholder of the company.

== Services ==
Guide to Iceland curates and quality checks Icelandic service providers and acts as a guarantee to travelers that they receive the services they book. It offers tours, rental cars, hotels, flights and vacation packages. It provides information and customer service in fourteen languages and its website contains numerous travel articles about Iceland.

== Awards ==
Guide to Iceland was chosen as the Best Exponential Startup at the 2016 Nordic Startup Awards.

For its fast growth, Guide to Iceland also took third place among 500 companies at Deloitte's 2017 Technology Fast 500 Europe, the Middle East and Africa event. In the same year, it took first place at Deloitte's Icelandic Technology Fast 50 event.

Guide to Iceland has won Iceland's Leading Travel Agency at the World Travel Awards four years in a row, from 2018 to 2021. As well as Iceland's leading Destination management company in 2020 and 2021.
