= Lækjartorg =

Square in downtown Reykjavík, Iceland

Coordinates: 64.1475°N 21.9364°W

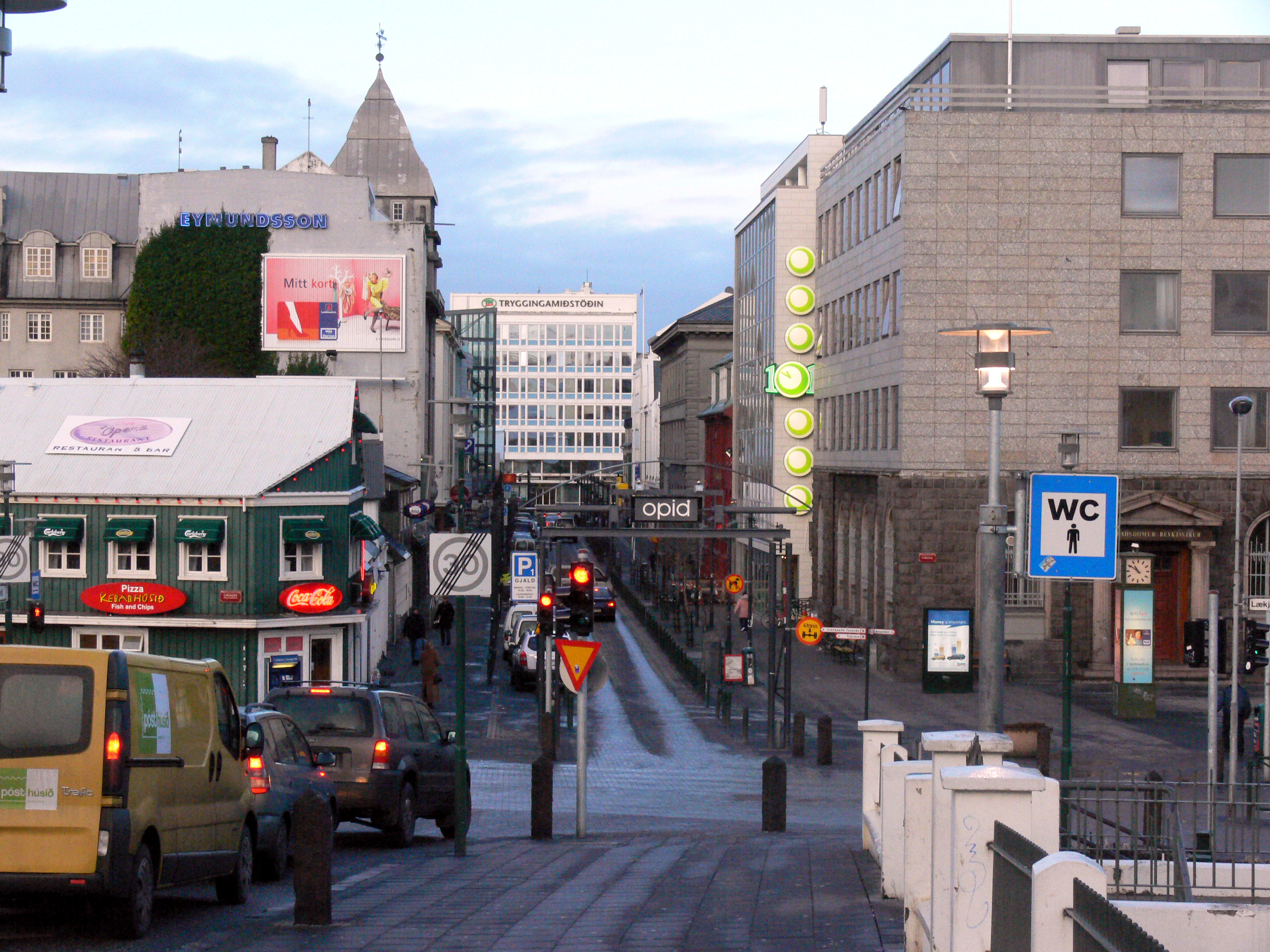
Lækjartorg (right), as seen from Bankastræti.

Lækjartorg (Icelandic pronunciation: [ˈlaiːcarˌtʰɔrk], "brook square") is a square in downtown Reykjavík, Iceland. It is located in Kvosin south of Reykjavík Harbor, where Bankastræti, Lækjargata and Austurstræti meet. Reykjavík District Court faces the square.
