= Stjórnarráðshúsið =

Government building in Reykjavík, Iceland

Coordinates: 64.1473°N 21.9353°W

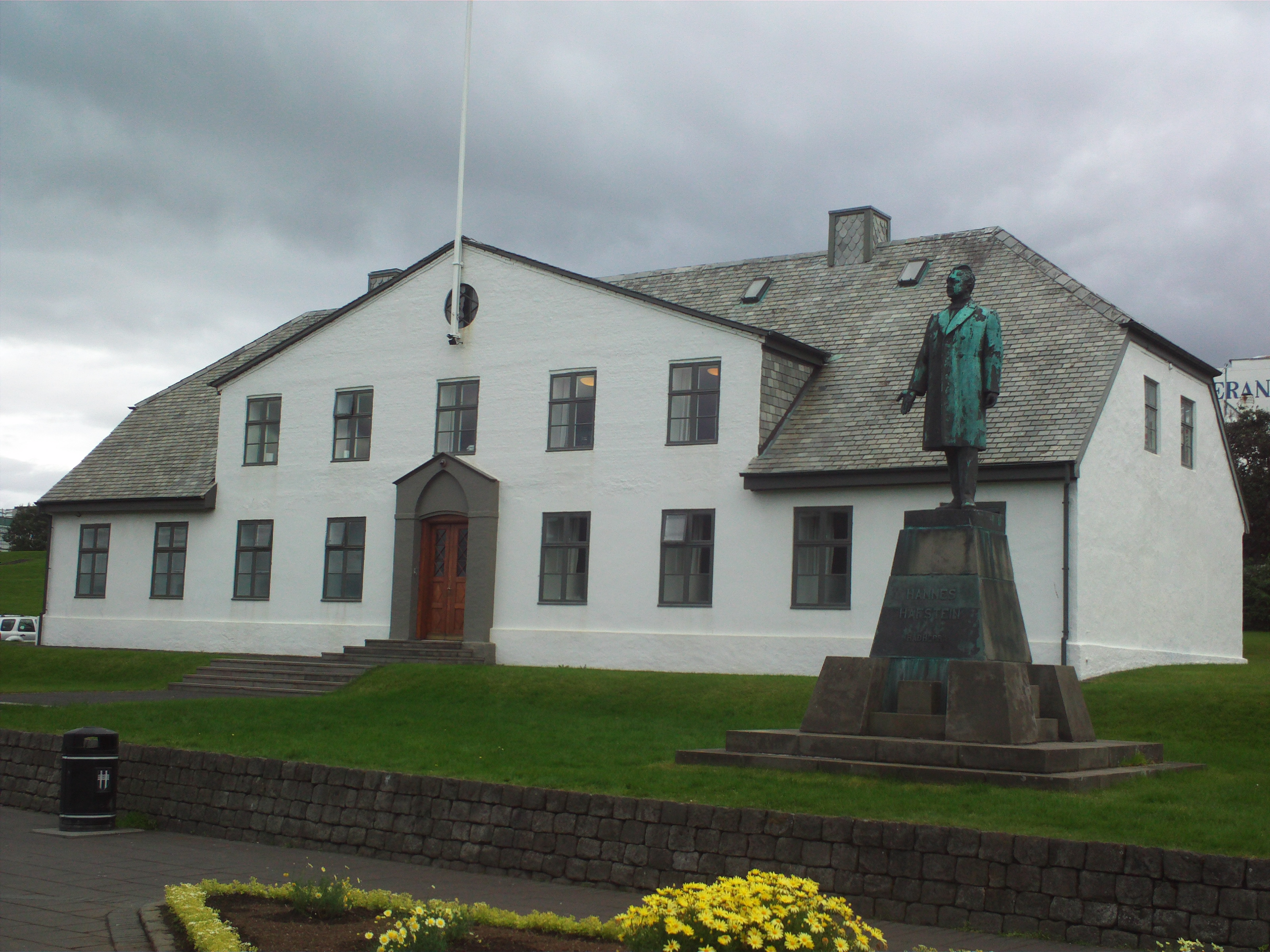
Stjórnarráðshúsið

Stjórnarráðshúsið (The Government House) is a stately home located on Lækjargata in Reykjavík, Iceland. The building houses the Prime Minister's Office. The building was originally built as the first penitentiary in Iceland, in the middle of the 18th century.

== History ==
The first known source where speculation appears about building a penitentiary in Iceland is in a letter from Henrik Ocksen to the governor Joachim Henriksen Lafrenz, dated 1733. At the time, Katrín Ingjaldsdóttir had been sentenced to death in Iceland but pardoned by the king, who reduced her sentence to a lifetime of penal servitude. Such pardons were not uncommon. As there were no facilities in the country to hold people captive forever, prisoners were sent to prison in Denmark.

On 20 March 1759, the King of Denmark finally issued a decree that a penitentiary had to be built in Iceland. This was at the instigation of Skúli Magnússon, a "bailiff", among other things in search of a solution to the so-called "wandering plague", i.e. that the number of people who were not permanently resident on farms was increasing in the country. In 1753 Skúli applied for a grant from the king to build a better house, "which could receive young and healthy wanderers and beggars who wander around the country in flocks". The construction of the house began in 1761 and condemned men then served their punishment by working on its construction. The house was ready for use a decade later, in the winter of 1770–71.

The penitentiary, which was commonly called the Wall, became the first and for a long time the only penitentiary in Iceland. Skúli Magnússon used prisoners in the penitentiary as labor for the Interiors. When the operation of the Interiors began to decline, the prisoners were rented out of the penitentiary as labor within Reykjavík. Within the administration of the Danish monarchy, to which Iceland belonged at the time, they were always mentioned as slaves, i.e. slaves, and their status within the penitentiary as slavery, i.e. slavery. The slaves helped with many of the tasks that needed to be done in the growing settlement.

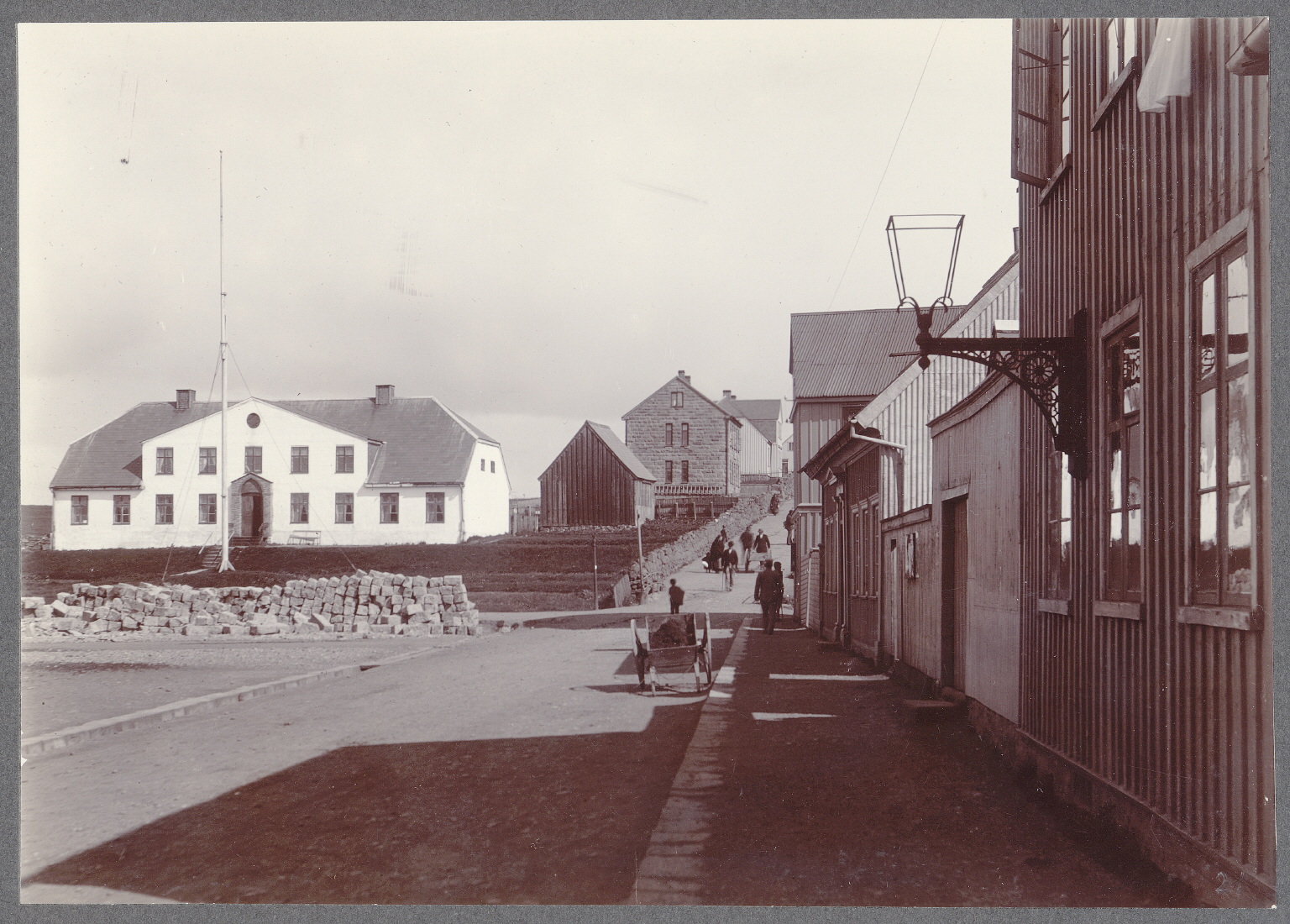
The building c. 1900

For the construction and operation of the penitentiary, a tax was levied on real estate and the value of cows for imprisonment (the penitentiary toll), and was unpopular among the people. The penitentiary was closed down in 1816.

In 1904, the first Icelandic ministry began working in the building, and later the Cabinet, after which the building is named, in 1918. Ever since, the offices of the Prime Minister and Government of Iceland have been in the building. The Office of the President of Iceland was also housed in Government House from 1973-1996. At Government House, the first Icelandic national flag was hoisted.
