= Vatnsmýrin Nature Reserve =

Protected moorland in Reykjavík, Iceland

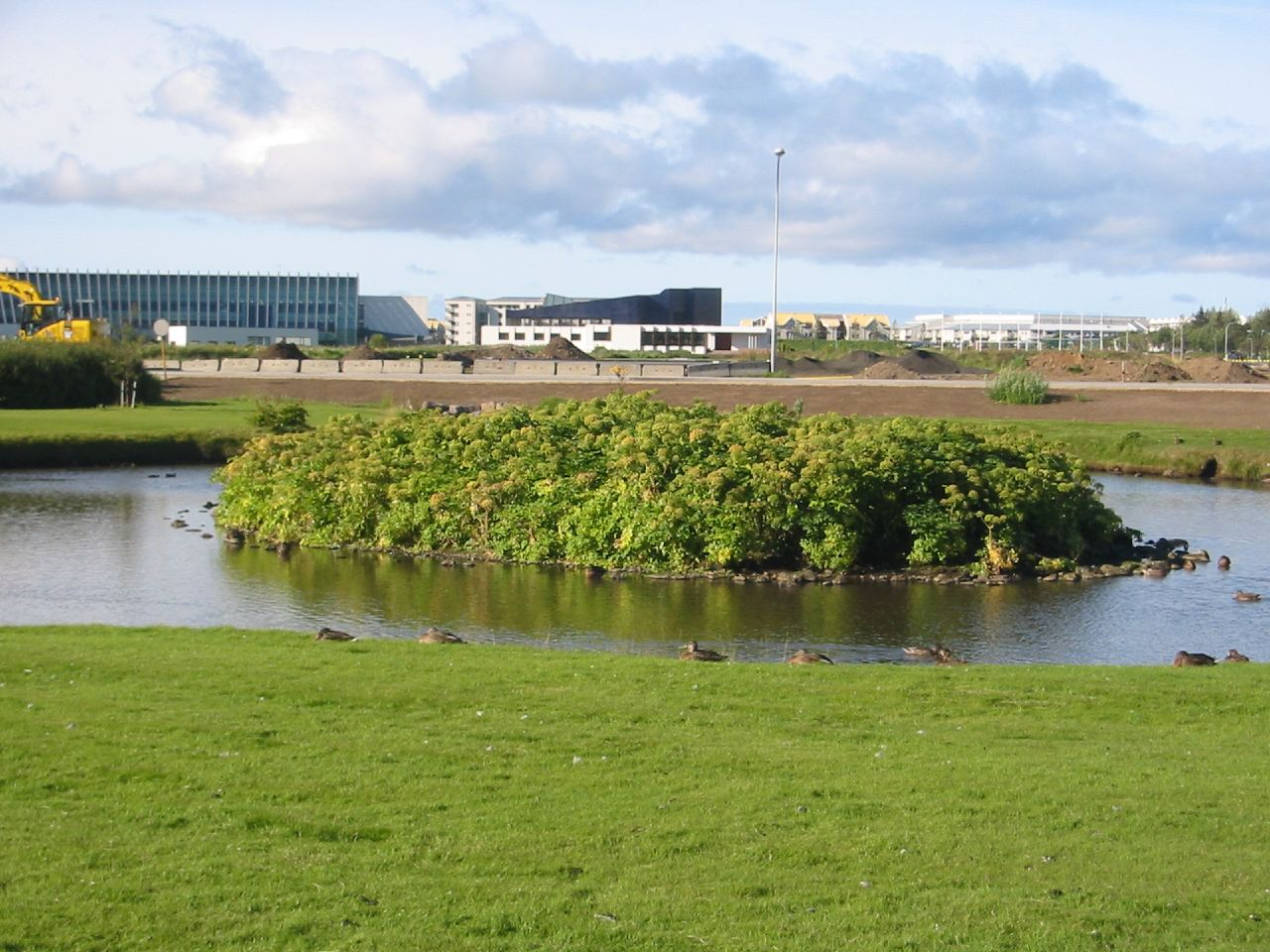
- Near Nordic House

- Location within Iceland
- Location: Vatnsmýrin Nature Reserve in Reykjavík
- Nearest city: Reykjavík
- Coordinates: 64°08′18″N 21°56′37″W
- Area: 37,026 square metres (398,540 sq ft)
- Established: 1981

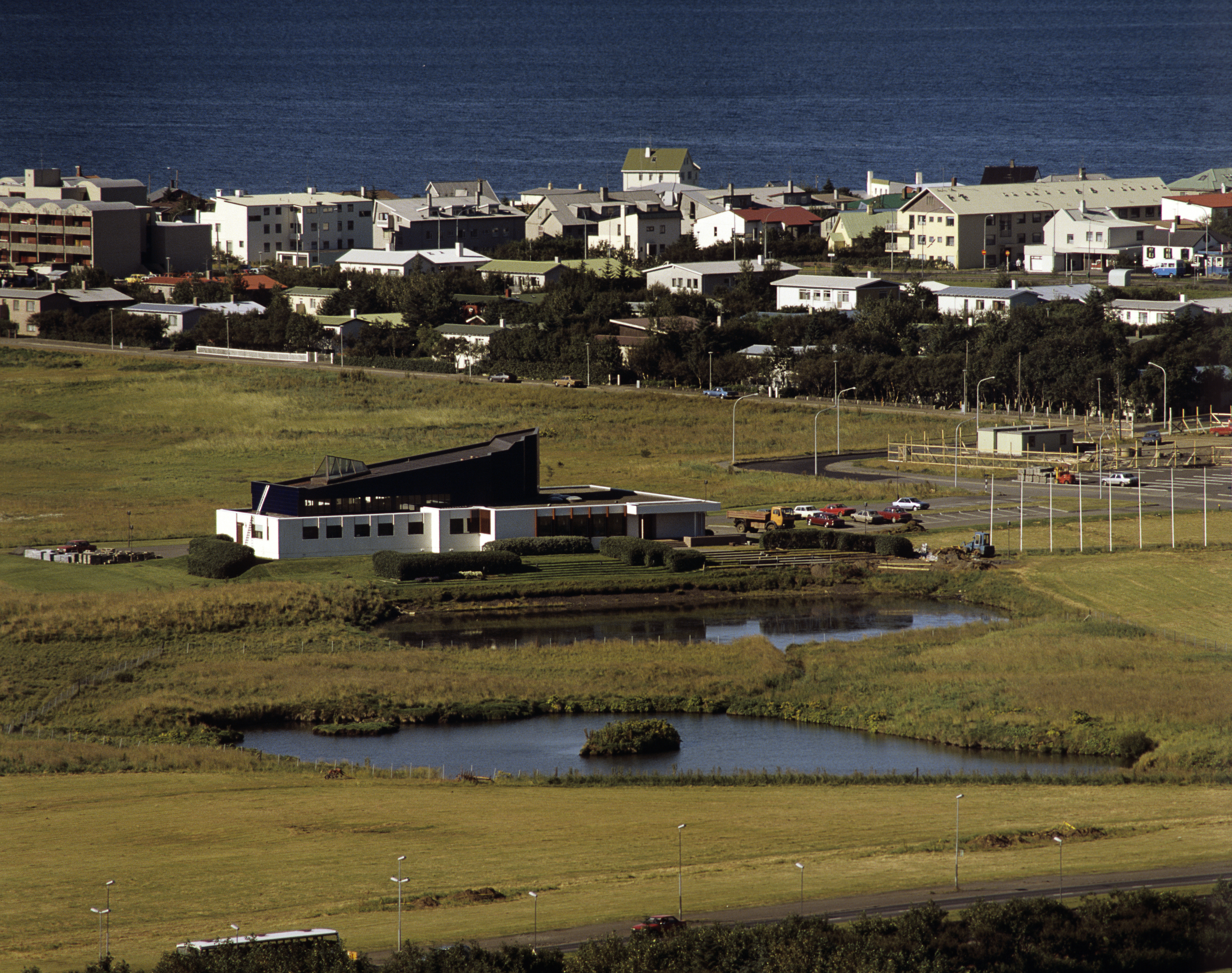
Nordic House borders the reserve.

The Vatnsmýrin Nature Reserve (Icelandic pronunciation: [ˈvassˌmiːrɪn], "water marsh") is a protected moorland in Reykjavík, Iceland. The reserve provides a water source for Tjörnin Lake and is a nesting ground for birds. It borders the Nordic House and the University of Iceland. The area within the Reserve including drains and fences, and measures 37,026 square metres (398,540 sq ft). Eighty-three species of vascular plants are documented. Biodiversity has been inhibited due to invasive animals and plants as well as industrial waste.

== History ==
Parts of what is now Vatnsmýri had been used as agricultural fields since the 19th century. In the 20th century, building activity encroached into the area. As the area had been known for its importance for wetland nesting birds, Vatnsmýri was designated a Nature Conservation area in 1981. The lake and parts of the wetland were established as a nature reserve in 1984 by the Reykjavík City Council. A general conservation plan, particularly for activities related to the nesting area of birds, was developed for the period of 1990–2001 by the City Council. A master plan for the period 2001–2024 was subsequently developed with detailing for pond areas, fencing, walkways, and bridges. Consequently, to filling the pond area, the water level in the canals rose by 2.75 metres (9 ft 0 in) with corresponding rise of ground water levels by 3.2 metres (10 ft). In 2012, the Nordic House promoted an exhibit on Vatnsmýrin.

== Vegetation ==
A floral survey was carried out in 2003 which identified species of vascular plants in the reserve. Swamp vegetation is the common flora. This is characterized as wetland vegetation, vegetation on an old excavation area, as well as vegetation on embankments. A report of 83 species vascular plants, itemized 65 as original Icelandic flora. Varied soil conditions in the reserve are attributed to the large floral diversity. The vascular plant species identified are the following:

- Achillea millefolium
- Achillea ptarmica
- Aconitum x stoerkiana Reichenb
- Agrostis capillaris
- Agrostis stolonifera
- Alchemilla alpina
- Alchemilla glomerulans Buser
- Alchemilla tela
- Alopecurus pratensis
- Angelica archangelica
- Anthoxanthum odoratum
- Anthriscus sylvestris Hoff
- Betula pubescens Ehrh
- Bromus inermis leysse
- Calamagrostis Strict Koele
- Caltha palustris
- Card Mine pratensis
- Carex lyngbyei Horne
- Carex nigra Reichardt
- Cerastium
- Chamomilla suaveolens Rydb
- Cirsium arvense scop
- Dactylis Glomerata
- Deschampsia caespitosa Beauv
- Elymus repens Gould
- Epilobium palustre
- Epilobium Watsonia Barbey
- Equisetum arvense
- Equisetum palustre
- Eriophorum angustifolium
- Euphrasia Frigida Pugsley
- Festuca rubra
- Festuca vivi pair Sm
- Filipendula ulmaria Maxim
- Galium verum
- Hippuris vulgaris
- Juncus alpinoarticulatus Chaix
- Juncus articus Wild
- Juncus articulates
- Leontodon autumnalis
- Leymus arenarius Hochst
- Luzula multi flora Lej
- Matricaria maritima
- Menyanthes trifoliate
- Montia fontana
- Myosotis arvensis
- Parnassia palustris
- Phalaris arundinacea
- Phleum pretense
- Pinguicula vulgaris
- Plantago maritima
- Poa annuals
- Poa pratensis
- Potentilla anserine
- Potentilla palustris scop
- Ranunculus acris
- Ranunculus repens
- Rhinanthus minor
- Rumex acetosa
- Rumex acetosella
- Rumex longifolius
- Saws procumbens
- Salix alaxensis
- Salix caprea
- Salix lanata
- Salix myrsinifolia
- Salix phylicifolia
- Senecio vulgaris
- Sorbus aucuparia
- Stellaria graminea
- Stellaria media
- Taraxacum officinale
- Trifolium medium
- Trifolium repens
- Triglochin palustris
- Tussilago farfara
- Valeriana sambucifolia
- Vicia cracca
- Vicia sepium
- Viola palustris
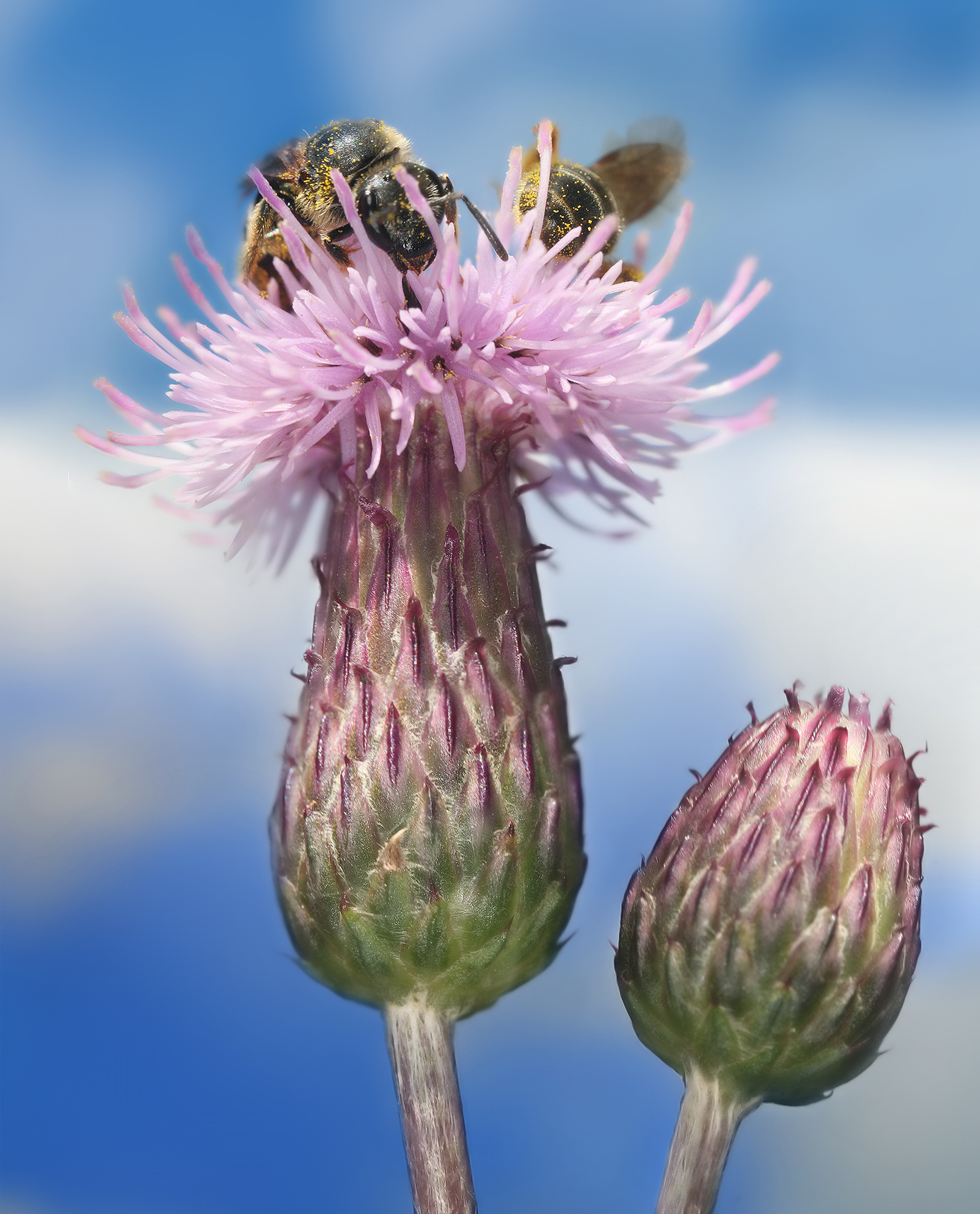
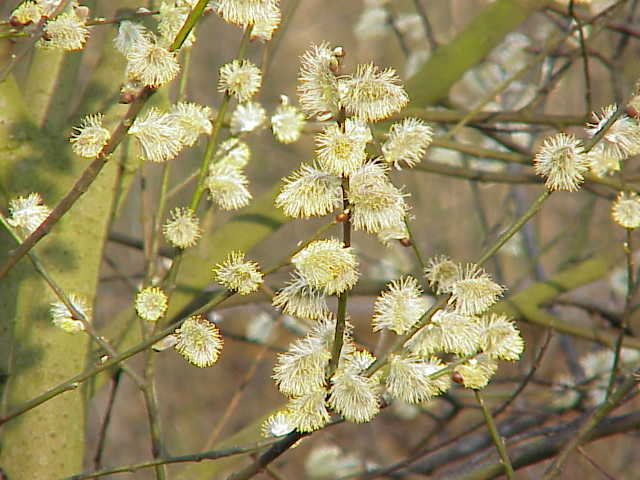
Left: Creeping Thistle Cirsium arvense. Right: Salix caprea

== Conservation ==
As a result of deterioration noted in the wetlands of Vatnsmýrin Reserve in recent years, the number of birds reported in the lake demonstrates a declining trend. This is attributed to the lack of adequate nesting grounds, though as a reserve, the nesting area has lacked adequate protection for nearly a decade as result of invasive plant species and animals. Chervil and thistle, which have grown dense, preclude birds from nesting. Action plans have been initiated jointly by the Nordic House, the University of Iceland, and City Council to improve the conditions in the reserve by removing invasive species, replacing these with wetland vegetation, building embankments, building sedimentation ponds in the main stream to improve the flow through the moors, and de-silting the lake.
