= Skúli Magnússon =

Icelandic civil servant (1711–1794)

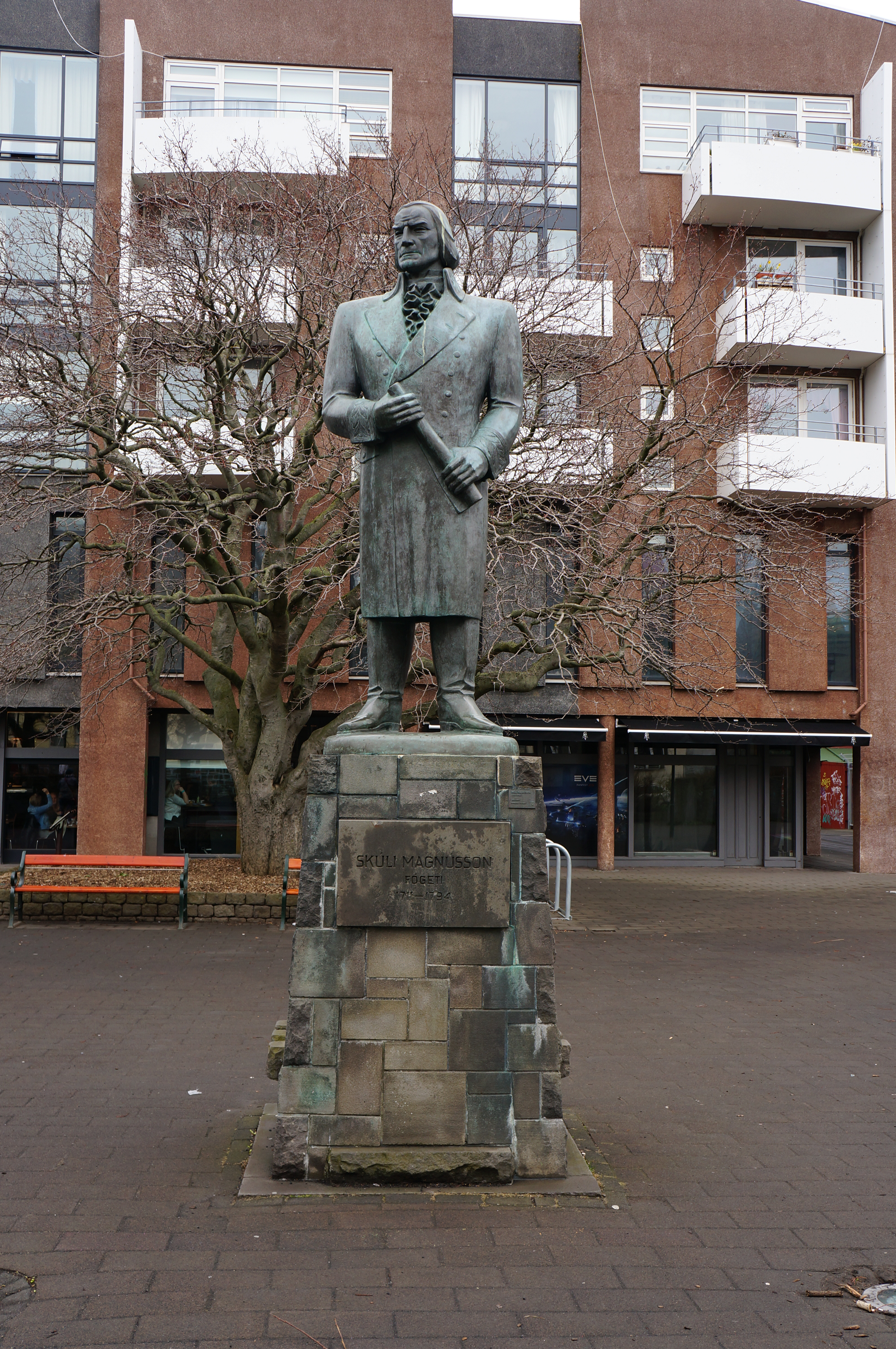
Statue of Skuli Magnusson in Reykjavik

Skúli Magnússon (12 December 1711 – 9 November 1794) was an Icelandic civil servant. He is often referred to as the father of Reykjavík due to King Frederik V of Denmark donating the estate of Reykjavík to Magnússon's Innréttingar corporation, which is largely seen as a turning point in the modern development of Iceland.

Magnússon used penal labour at Stjórnarráðshúsið in Reykjavík. The Danish royal administration referred to these penal laborers as slaves. Magnússon's slaves were responsible for various tasks needed for the growth of the settlement.

== Early life ==
Magnússon was born on 12 December, 1711 in Nord-Þingeyjarsýsla to Magnús Einarsson, a priest in Húsavík, and Oddný Jónsdóttir.
