= Lækjargata =

Street in downtown Reykjavík, Iceland

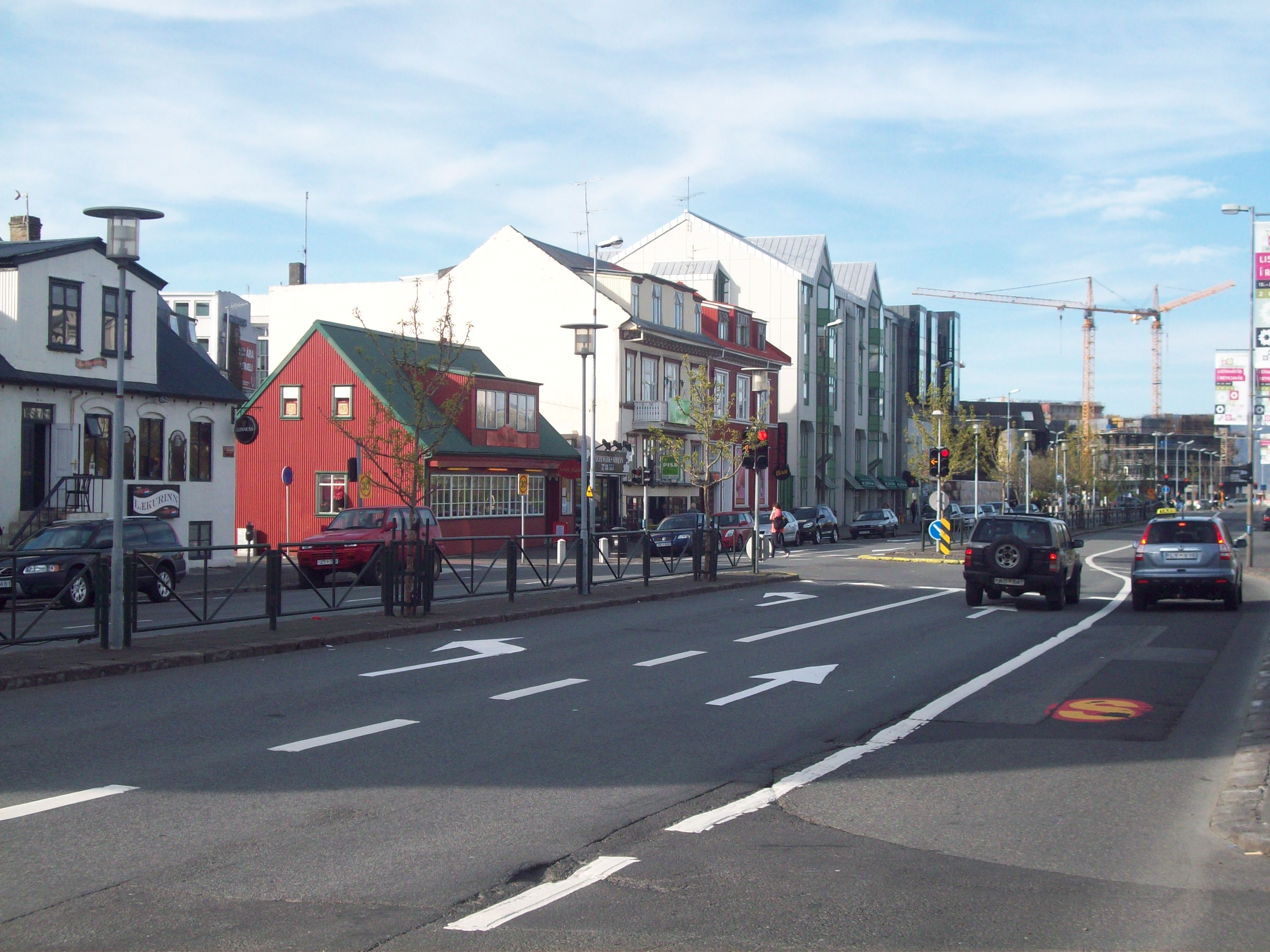
Lækjargata

Lækjargata (Icelandic pronunciation: [ˈlaiːcarˌkaːta], "stream street") is a street in downtown Reykjavík and takes its name from the stream that once ran along the street, from the Tjörnin to the sea.

== History ==
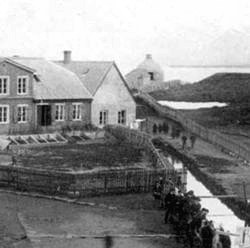
An early photograph of Lækurinn, showing the Siemsenhus and lime kiln in the background

=== Settlement period ===
In Spring 2015, the remains of a 22 metre long tenth- or eleventh-century turf building with a 5.2 metre long hearth at the north end were found under the present lot Lækjargata 10-12. At this time, the area of Lækjargata was part of the marshy Austurvöllur, a field belonging to the farmers of Vík.

=== Development of the street ===
Lækjargata began to take its present form in the late eighteenth century, when two houses were built there. They were built when Reykjavík Cathedral was built on the neighbouring Austurvöllur in 1787. Einar Valdason built a turf farmhouse to the south-east of the cathedral, first called Kirkjuból ('church dwelling') and later Lækjarkot ('stream cottage'). Lækjargata was in those days called Heilagsandastræti ('Holy Spirit street'), because one of the houses was inhabited by Bishop Helgi Thordersen and the other by the cathedral priest, Ólafur Pálsson. As the population of Reykjavík grew, the street was extended on the south side of the stream all the way to Tjörnin. Lækjarkot was replaced in 1887 with a wooden house, which became Lækjargata 10a.

In 1828, a bridge was built over the stream, facilitating the development of Lækjartorg and the intersecting Bankastræti. In 1846, Lækjargata 7 became the new home to Menntaskólinn í Reykjavík.

== Sources ==
- Ahrentzhús, Lesbók Morgunblaðsins 1962
