= Tjörnin =

Lake in Reykjavík, Iceland

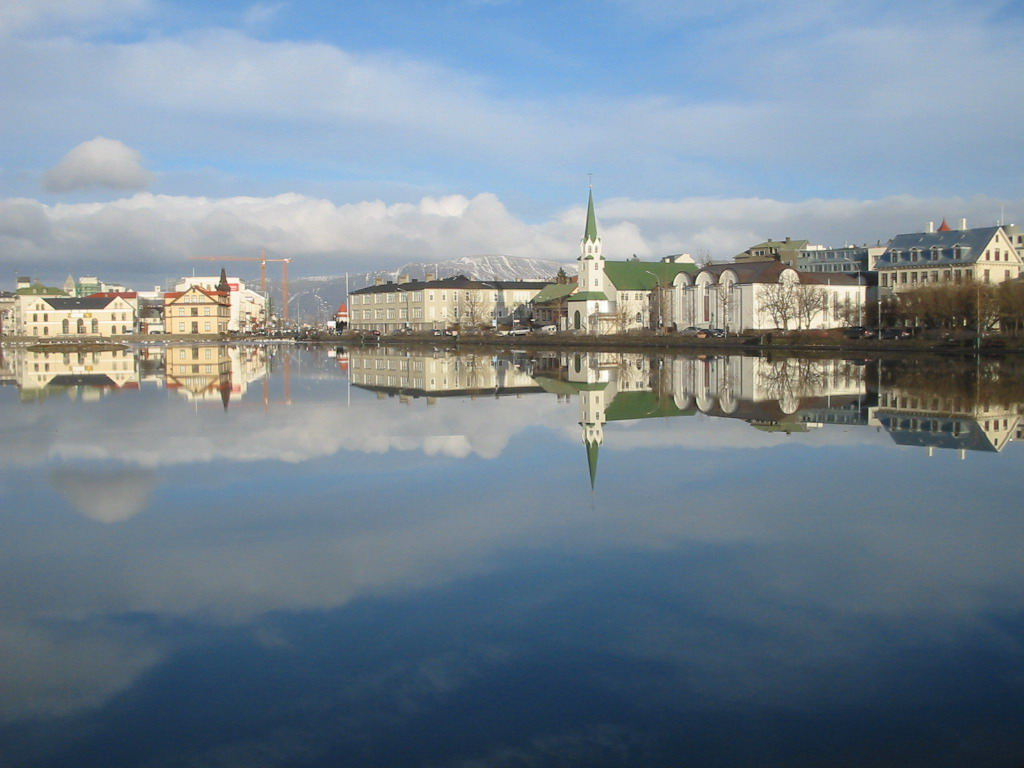
- Tjörnin as seen from Skothúsvegur (a bridge)

- Location within Iceland
- Location: Reykjavík
- Coordinates: 64°08′40″N 21°56′33″W
- Basin countries: Iceland
- Average depth: 0.57 m (1 ft 10 in)
- Max. depth: 0.8 m (2 ft 7 in)
- Surface elevation: about 16 m (52 ft)

Tjörnin (Icelandic pronunciation: [ˈtʰjœ(r)tnɪn]) is a small, prominent lake in central Reykjavík, the capital of Iceland. Most visitors to the city pass along its shore, as it is situated in the city centre next to the Reykjavik City Hall and several museums. Tjörnin means "the pond".

Feeding the birds on the lake shores is a popular pastime, so much that it has been referred to as "the biggest bread soup in the world".

== Geography ==
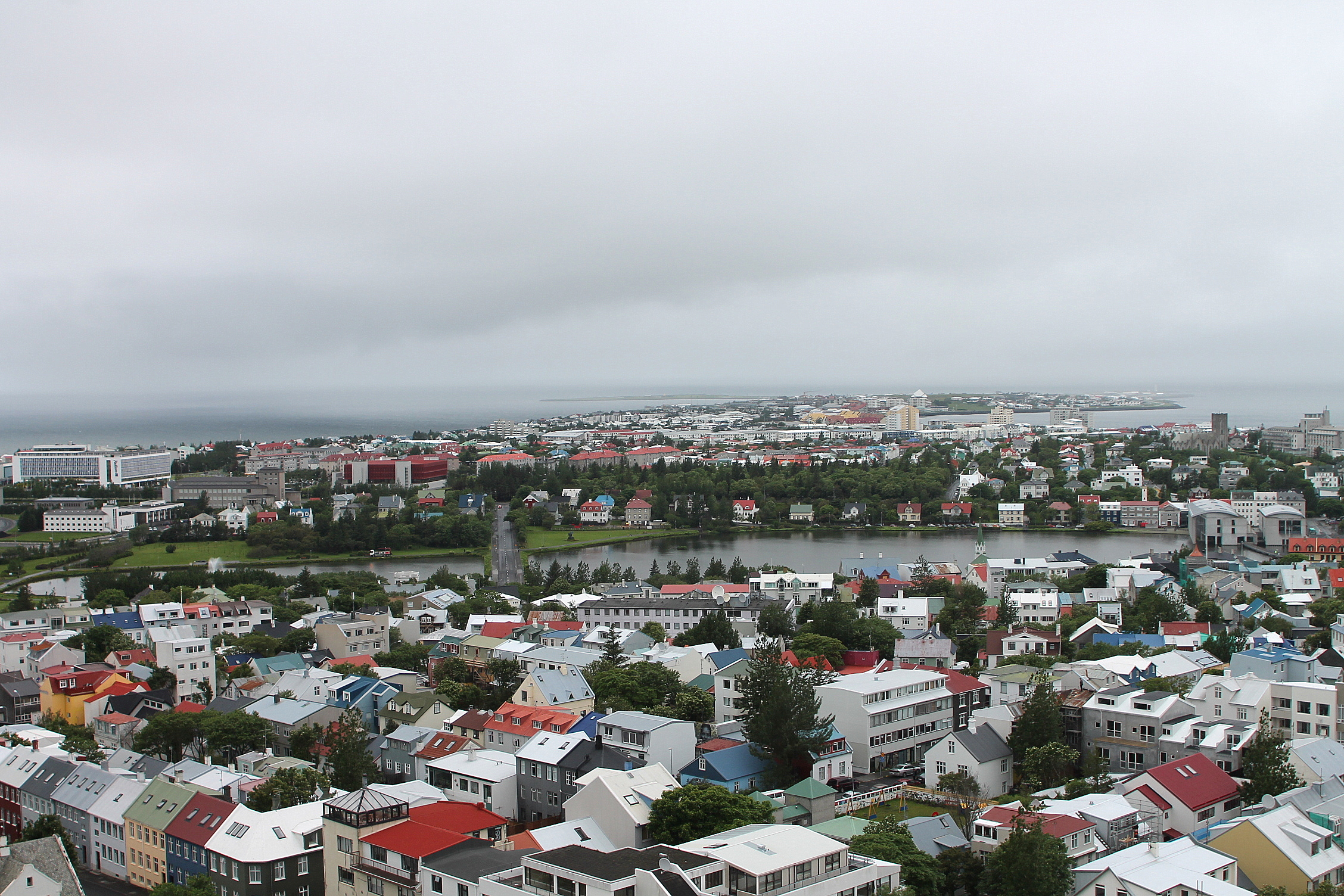
Tjörnin as seen from Hallgrímskirkja

Tjörnin is described as a lagoon next to a barrier beach. The lake's formation is attributed to the lagoon which was part of a reef that existed at the present location of Hafnarstræti (a city street, "Harbour Street"). This street, which passes through the business section of the city, lies on the southern side of the lake and leads to the gardens. The Vatnsmýri marsh feeds the lake. The outflow from the lake is Lækurinn, previously an open water channel flowing through the city centre, but since 1911 part of the sewage system under Lækjargata. During the winter, the lake usually freezes periodically and is used for ice skating. The average depth is 0.57m (1.9 feet) with the deepest point at 0.8m (2.4 feet). Both banks of the lake are paved and terminate at the Hljómskálagarður (formally known as Tjarnargarður), a well-tended park decorated with statues to the south of the lake. The winding paths are frequented by joggers and cyclists. Notice boards along the shore give daily reports of the numbers of birds on the lake.

== Avifauna ==
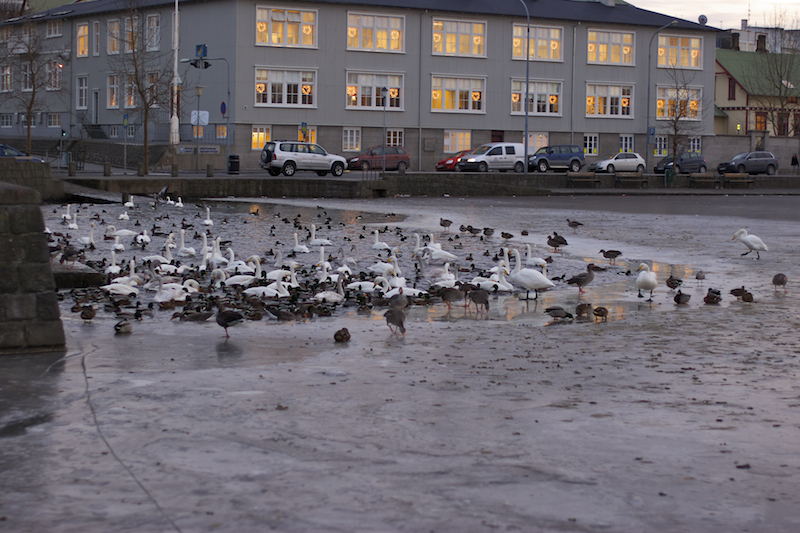
Water birds during winter in a frost free area

The lake is frequented by between 40 and 50 species of water birds, including the Arctic tern, the Eider, the Gadwall, the Greylag goose and other species of goose, the Mallard, several species of seagulls, and the scaup. Whooper swan are viewable within close proximity. The Arctic tern’s arrival heralds the start of summer. Birders from all over the North Atlantic come to pursue their hobby in the lake area. The lake is also a favorite place to take young children to watch and feed birds. The popularity of bird feeding has led to the lake being poetically referred to as "the biggest bread soup in the world" (stærsta brauðsúpa í heimi). Lately, however, preying seagulls have caused the City Council to issue warnings to residents, asking them to refrain from feeding the ducks in Tjörnin to avoid putting ducklings at risk.

== Cityscape ==
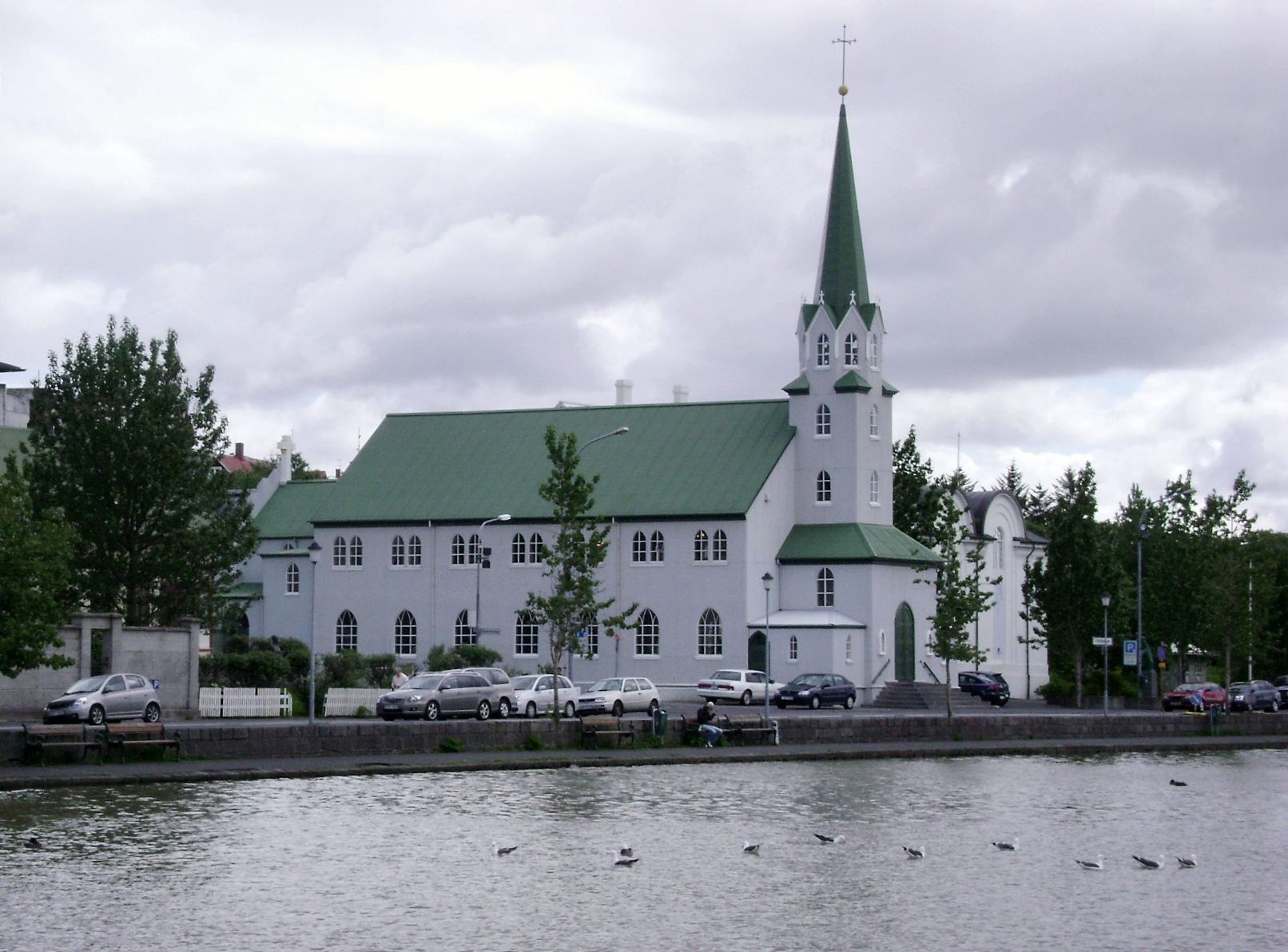
Fríkirkjan í Reykjavík church

The earliest urban development of Reykjavík took place between the lake and the northern coast of the peninsula. Over the years, the lake became an integral part of the urban environment. Development of the city has centered around the lake. The postmodern City Hall, Ráðhúsið, stands in the northwest corner on the edge of the lake: it looks as if it is rising out of the lake. Other notable buildings in the area are those of the Supreme Court, Reykjavík Art Museum, the National Museum, the Living Art Museum, Reykjavík City Library, and the National Theatre, as well as the Parliament building, which houses the Parliament of Iceland, and the Dómkirkja cathedral, apart from a shopping complex and restaurants. Several buildings belonging to the University of Iceland are also close by.

Reykjavík airport is situated immediately south of the lake, on the other side of the Hringbraut thoroughfare.

A wooden pedestrian bridge was built over Tjörnin in 1920. To accommodate motorized traffic, the original construction was replaced in 1942 by a concrete bridge which is still in use.

== Conservation ==
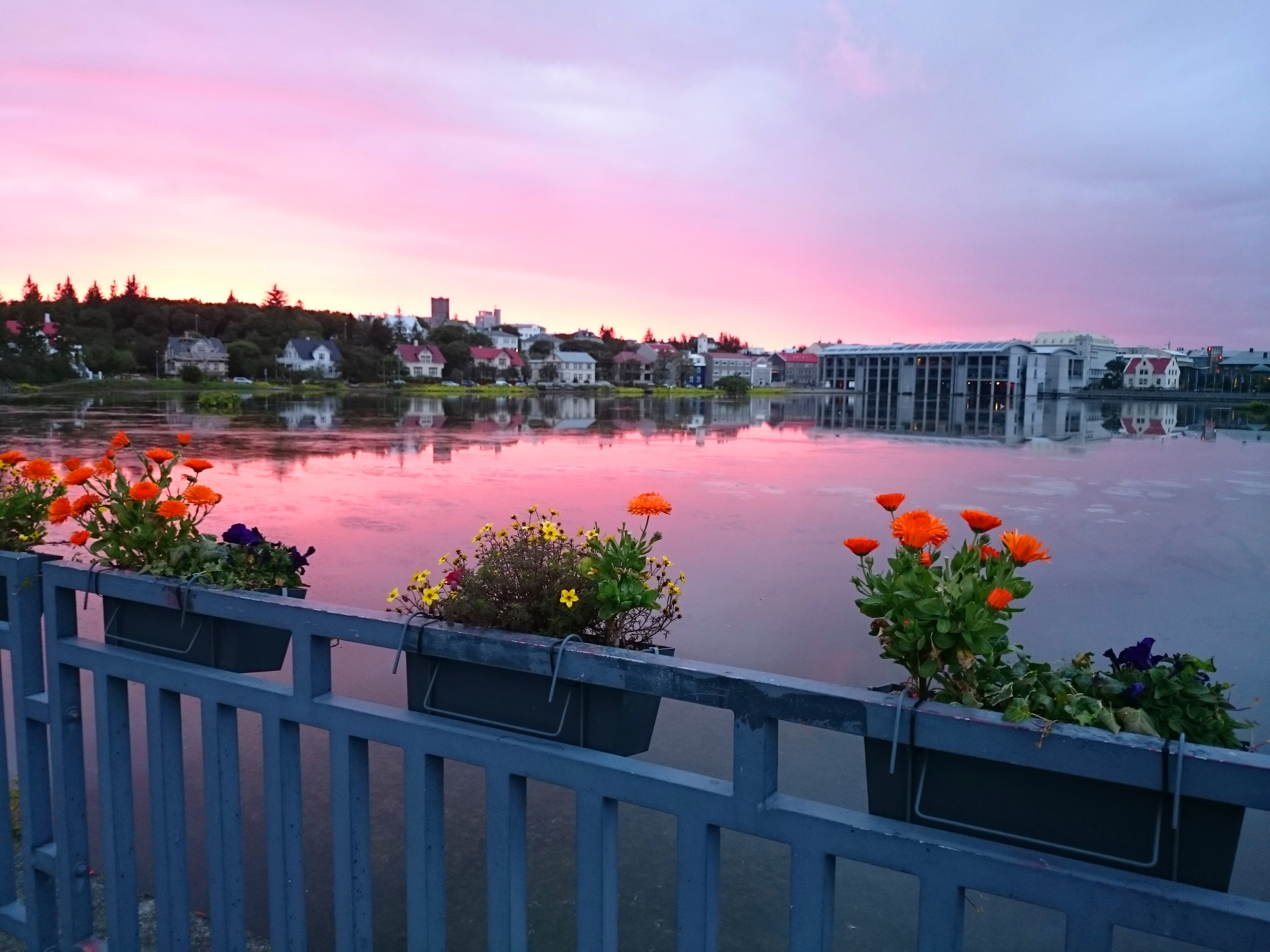
Tjörnin

Vatnsmýrin Reserve, the protected area around Tjörnin, has deteriorated in recent years as evidenced by a drop in the variety of reported birds. Part of the issue is attributed to the lack of appropriate nesting grounds due to invasive flora species as well as the presence of animals in the reserve. Action plans have been initiated jointly by the Nordic House, the University of Iceland, and Reykjavík City Council, to improve the reserve's condition with appropriate wetland vegetation, construction of embankments and sedimentation ponds to improve the water flow, as well as some desilting of the lake.

== In popular culture ==
Tjörnin was the setting for scenes in the 2010 film Gauragangur as well as a tragic scene from the 2014 film Life in a Fishbowl.

== Gallery ==
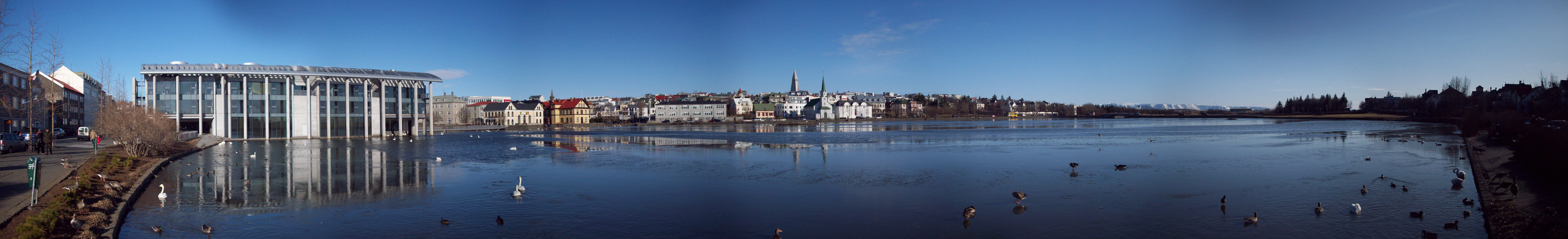
180 degree view of Tjörnin
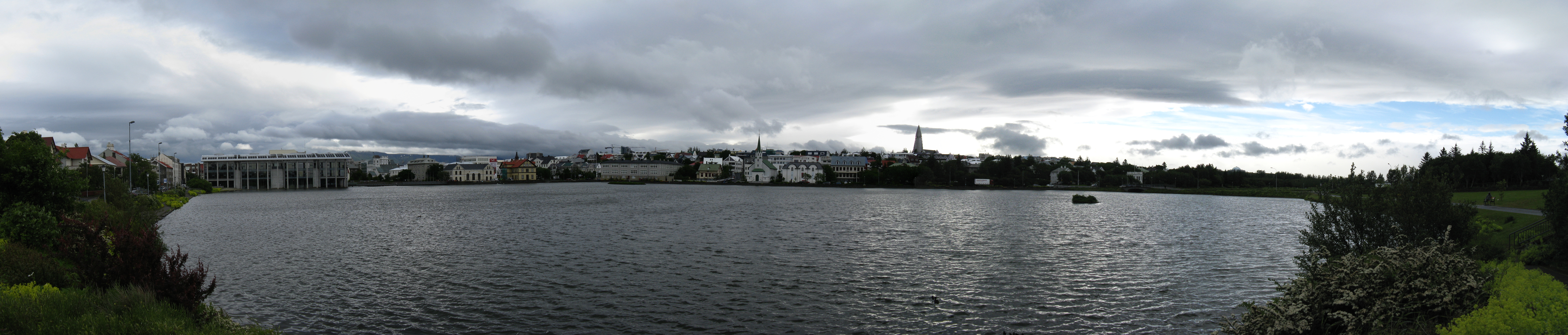
Panoramic image of Tjörnin in July 2014

== See also ==
- List of lakes of Iceland
