= Studio Granda =

Studio Granda is a practice of architects based in Reykjavík, Iceland. It was founded in 1987 by partners Margrét Harðardóttir (1959, Reykjavík, Iceland) and Steve Christer (1960, Blackfyne, UK). They studied at the Architectural Association in London.

== Architectural philosophy ==
Studio Granda's work is characterised by a respect for the traditional materials of Iceland - stone, sheet metal and timber - and with their sensitive awareness of local context can be linked to the Critical Regionalism school. The work might also be regarded in the light of the Nordic modernist tradition, typified by architects such as Alvar Aalto, Erik Gunnar Asplund, Sverre Fehn, and Jørn Utzon.

== Important works ==
Reykjavík City Hall (1987-1992)

Supreme Court of Iceland, Reykjavík (1993-1996):

Reykjavík Art Museum (1997-2000)

Car Park, Kringlan Shopping Centre, Reykjavík (1998-1999)

Bifröst Business School extension, café & quadrangle (2001-2002)

Student Accommodation and research wing at Bifröst Business School (2003-2005)

As well as the building projects listed above, the practice has been involved in a number of infrastructure projects in collaboration with Línuhönnun Consulting Engineers.
