= Bankastræti núll =

Cover of Bankastræti núll (publ. Forlagið)

Bankastræti núll ('0 Bank Street') is a collection of twenty-five essays about the 2008–11 Icelandic financial crisis by Einar Már Guðmundsson. It takes its name from the euphemistic name of old public toilets at the end of Bankastræti in Reykjavík, which Einar Már presents as a metaphor for the banking sector generally.

In the assessment of Alda Kravic,

although digressive and playful, 'Bankastræti Núll' remains an earnest effort to retrieve lost connections between past and present, politics and poetry, prosperity and poverty. Iceland’s economic collapse was not an isolated event but part of a global system that now binds Iceland and Haiti closer together as captives of the IMF. Moreover, the persistent division between the sciences and the arts and an ever-increasing specialisation of labour only heightens our sense of fragmentation and alienation.

== Translations ==
- Chapter 11, 'Lærisveinar Miltons Friedman', has been translated into English as 'Disciples of Milton Friedman' by Alda Kravic.
- Another chapter was translated as 'The Storyteller', Iceland Review, 50 (2) (2012), 26–29.
- Passages from the book, mixed with others published in Einar Már's Hvíta bókin, appear in Einar Már Guðmundsson, 'Prologue: Some Poetic Thoughts Concerning Meltdown', in Gambling Debt: Iceland’s Rise and Fall in the Global Economy, ed. by E. Paul Durrenberger and Gisli Palsson (Boulder: University Press of Colorado, 2015), pp. xxxi-xlii. DOI: 10.5876/9781607323358.c000.
- The book has been translated into Danish as Bankstræde nr. 0, trans. by Erik Skyum-Nielsen (Copenhagen: Information, 2011).
