= Austurvöllur =

Public square in Reykjavík, Iceland

Coordinates: 64.1472°N 21.9398°W

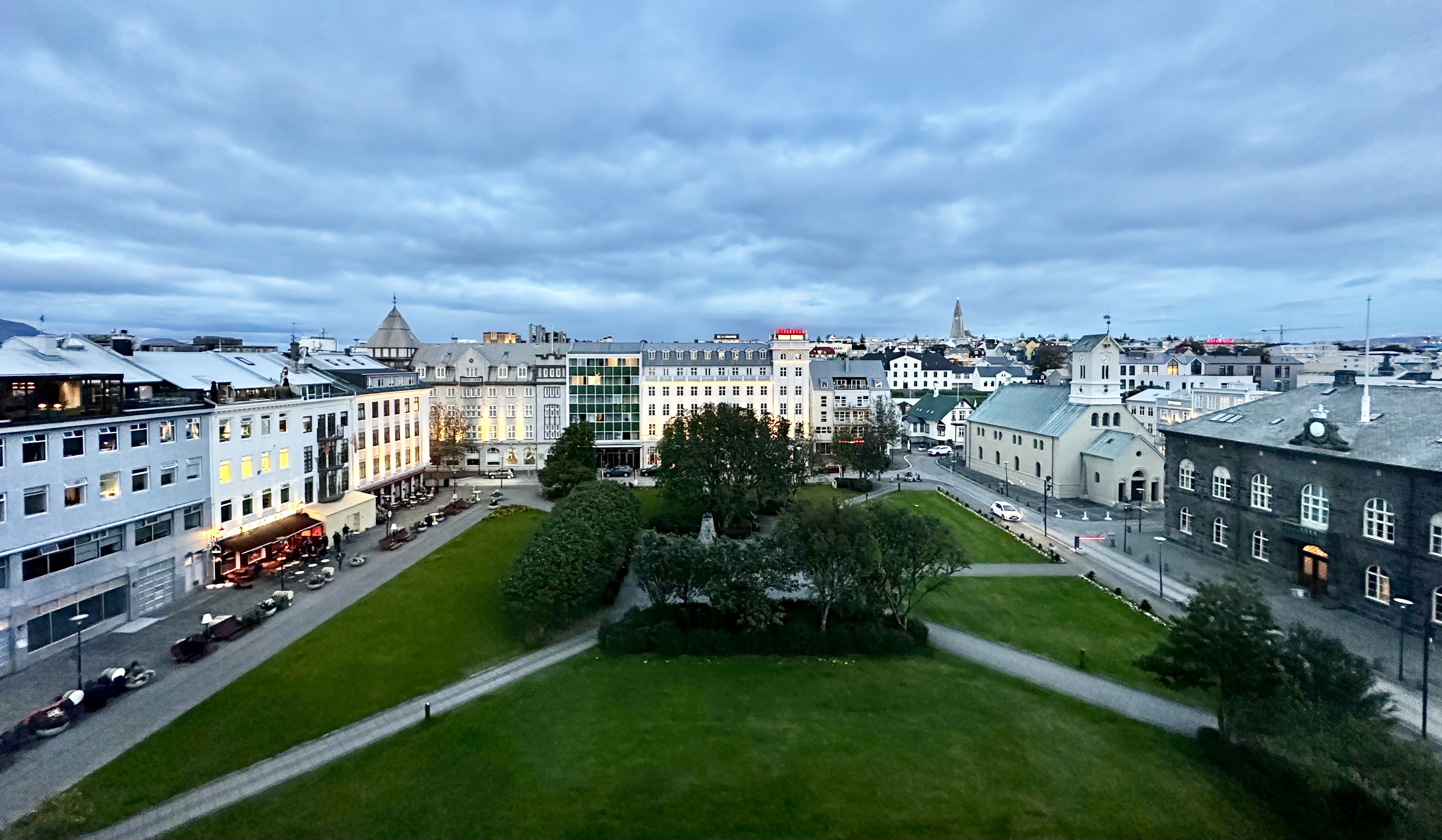
Austurvöllur in 2023. The Reykjavík Cathedral (Dómkirkjan í Reykjavík) and the Parliament House (Alþingishúsið) are on the right. Hallgrímskirkja is visible in the distance.

Austurvöllur (Icelandic pronunciation: [ˈœystʏrˌvœtlʏr̥]) is a public square in Reykjavík, Iceland. The square is a popular gathering place for the citizens of Reykjavík, and especially during good weather due to the prevalence of cafés on Vallarstræti and Pósthússtræti. It has also been a focal point of protests, as it is near the Parliament of Iceland.

The square contains a large statue of Jón Sigurðsson, a leader of Iceland's independence movement.

Austurvöllur is surrounded by Vallarstræti, Pósthússtræti, Kirkjustræti and Thorvaldsensstræti. The last of these is named after Bertel Thorvaldsen, a statue of whom was, for a long time, present in the centre of Austurvöllur, now occupied by a statue of Jón Sigurðsson. Located around the perimeter of the square are: Alþingishúsið (the Parliament House), Dómkirkjan (the city's oldest church), the Hotel Borg, as well as numerous cafés, restaurants and bars.

In the early 18th century, Austurvöllur was much larger and stretched from Aðalstræti in the west towards the creek in the east, and from Aðalstræti in the north towards Tjörnin in the south.

== Protests at Austurvöllur ==
There has been a tradition of protests taking place in Austurvöllur. One of the first of these such protests were the demonstrations which took in relation to the intended placement of radio towers across the country in 1905, when thousands of people gathered together in Austurvöllur. Several years later a major riot occurred on 30 March 1949, when a resolution was adopted on Iceland's entry into NATO. On this occasion police used teargas to disperse rioters.

== Raddir fólksins protests ==
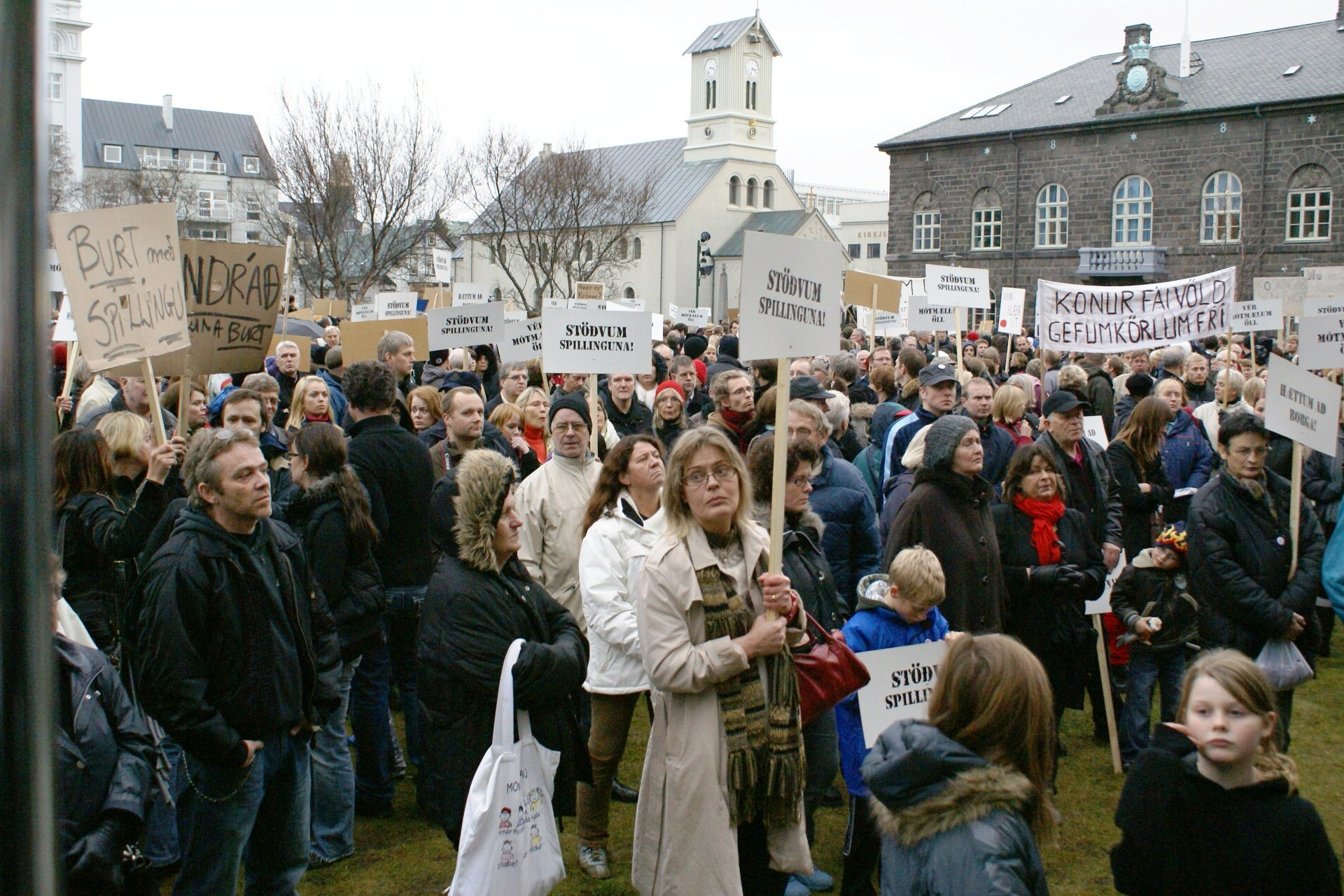
November 2008 protest in Austurvöllur

Following the economic crisis of 2008, protests by the political organization Raddir fólksins ("Voices of the people") began in Austurvöllur on 11 October 2008, and continued to be held every Saturday until the resignation of the government of Prime Minister Geir Haarde. The main demands of the protests were the resignations of the government, the Central Bank of Iceland, and the board of The Financial Supervisory Authority. The demonstrations were in part identified with property destruction and violence against police officers.
