= Reykjavík Cathedral =

Reykjavík Cathedral Dómkirkjan í Reykjavík
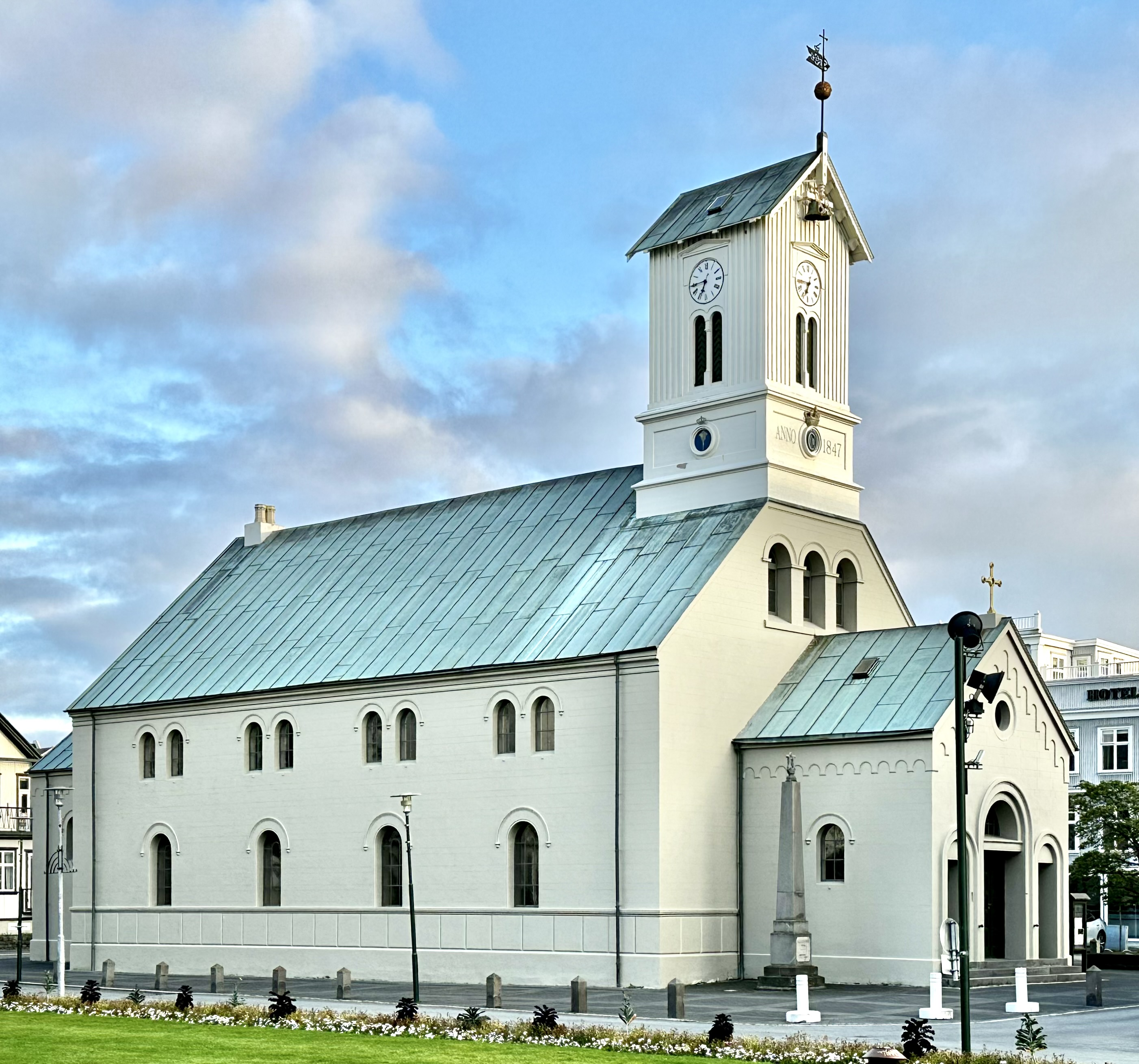
- Reykjavík Cathedral seen from Austurvöllur
- Reykjavík Cathedral; Dómkirkjan í Reykjavík
- 64°08′48″N 21°56′21″W
- Location: Reykjavík
- Country: Iceland
- Denomination: Church of Iceland
- Website: domkirkjan.is

History
- Status: Cathedral church of the Diocese of Iceland
- Consecrated: 1796, 1879 (reconsecrated after major restoration)

Administration
- Diocese: Iceland

Clergy
- Bishop: Guðrún Karls Helgudóttir
- Dean: Sveinn Valgeirsson
- Pastor: Elínborg Sturludóttir

Reykjavík Cathedral (Icelandic: Dómkirkjan í Reykjavík; Danish: Reykjavik Domkirke) is a cathedral church in Reykjavík, Iceland, the seat of the Bishop of Iceland and mother church of the Evangelical Lutheran Church of Iceland, as well as the parish church of the old city centre and environs. It is located at Austurvöllur, and next to it is Alþingishúsið (the parliament house). Since Iceland's parliament, the Alþingi, was resurrected in 1845, each session of parliament has begun with a Mass at the cathedral, and from there the dean of the cathedral leads the members of parliament to the parliament house.

== History and architecture ==
The cathedral was constructed in 1787 from a design by royal building inspector Andreas Hallander. This building was demolished in 1847 to make way for a somewhat larger church building.

== Furnishings ==
The organ boasts three manuals and thirty-one independent voices and was built in Berlin by the Karl Schuke Berliner Orgelbauwerkstatt.

== See also ==
- List of cathedrals in Iceland
