= Austurstræti =

Street in downtown Reykjavík, Iceland

Coordinates: 64°08′52.1″N 21°56′23.3″W

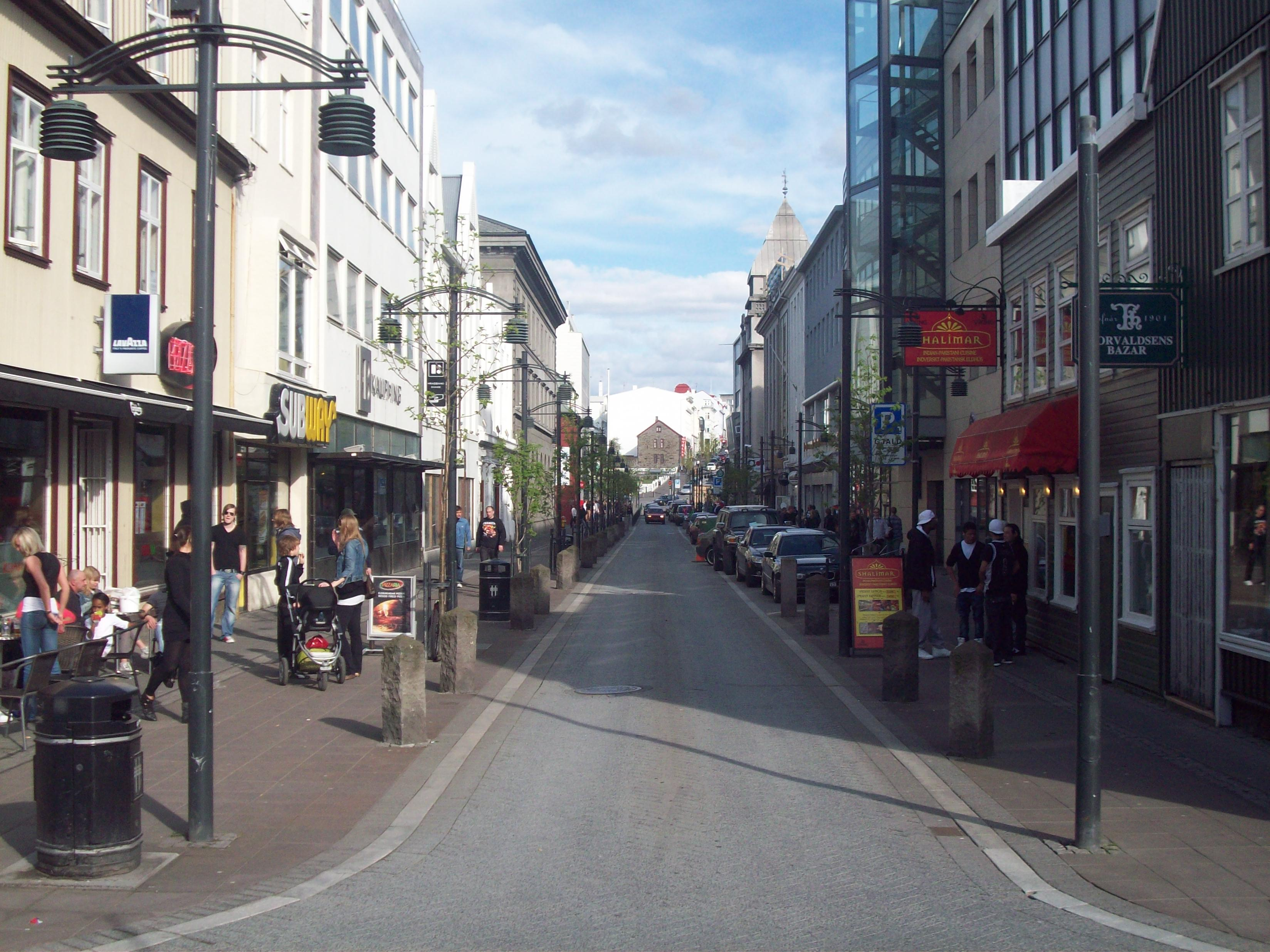
Austurstræti in 2009

Austurstræti (Icelandic pronunciation: [ˈœystʏrˌstraiːtɪ], 'East Street') is a street in central Reykjavík, Iceland, that runs from Veltusund east to Lækjargata. In its continuation is Bankastræti and Laugavegur. On 18 April 2007, a fire broke out in Austurstræti that destroyed two historic houses, but caused no injuries.

== Names ==
Austurstræti was first called Langafortov or Langastétt (transl. Long pavement). The street was so named because its south side was paved with stone so people could walk over it despite heavy rain.

== In popular culture ==
- Comedian Laddi sang about Austurstræti in a popular pop song with the same name. Its opening lines are: Ég niður' í Austurstræti snarast létt á strigaskónum, með bros á vör og tyggígúmmí í munninum. (transl. Down in Austurstræti, I walk lightly on my sneakers, with a smile on my face and a piece of chewing gum in my mouth.)
- The pop song "Fröken Reykjavík" by Jónas and Jón Múla Árnason begins with the question: Hver gengur þarna eftir Austurstræti og ilmar eins og vorsins blóm með djarfan svip og ögn af yfirlæti á ótrúlega rauðum skóm? (transl. Who walks along Austurstræti and smells like spring flowers with a bold expression and a hint of arrogance on incredible red shoes?)
- Poet Tómas Guðmundsson wrote the poem "Austurstræti", which includes the lines: Og þúsund hjörtu grípur gömul kæti. / Og gömul hjörtu þrá á ný og sakna. / Ó, bernsku vorrar athvarf, Austurstræti, / hve endurminningarnar hjá þér vakna. (transl. And a thousand hearts are captured by old hilarity. / And old hearts yearn again and miss. / Oh, our childhood refuge, Austurstræti', / how your memories awaken.)
