= Bankastræti =

Street in downtown Reykjavík, Iceland

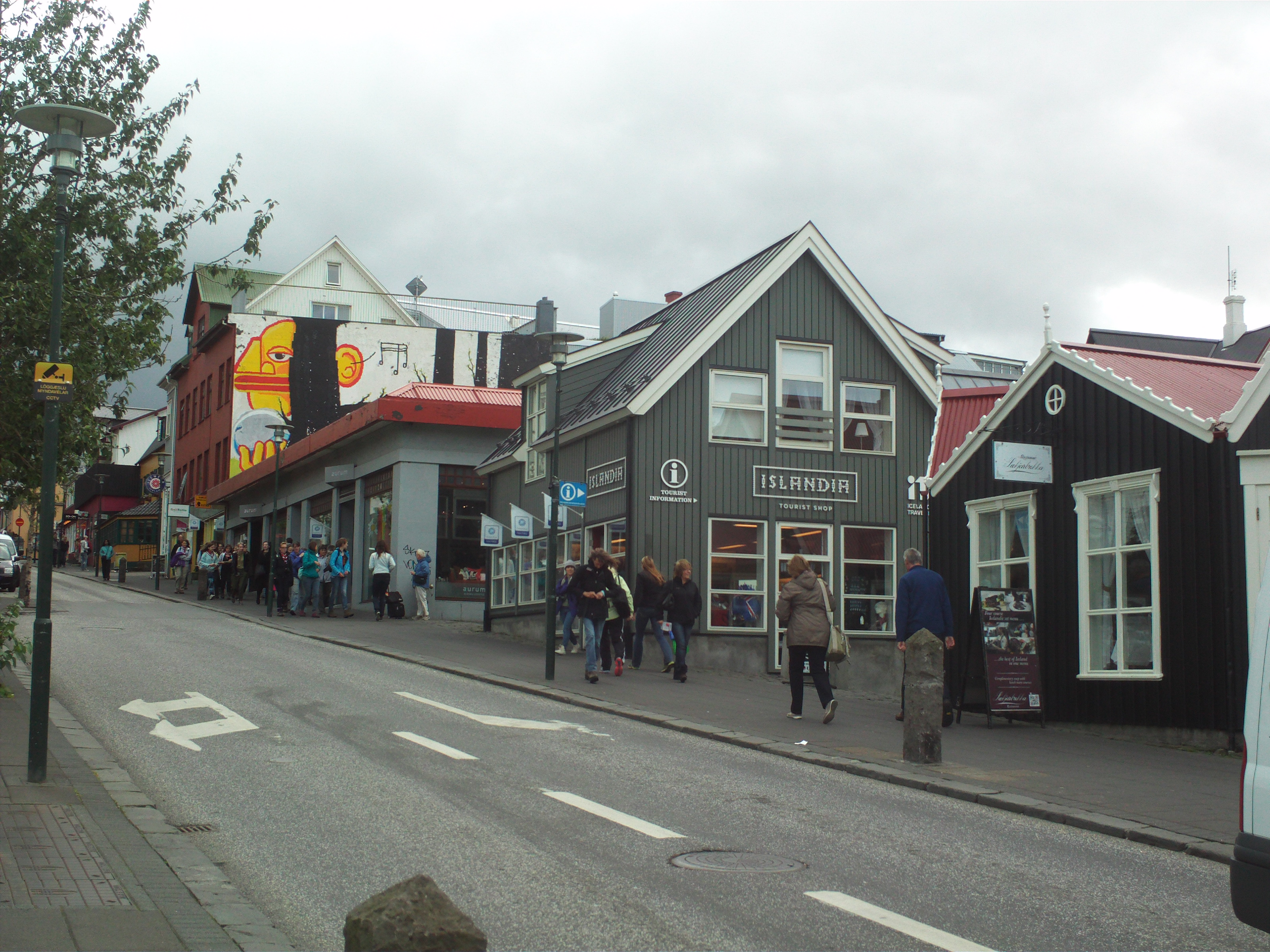
Bankastræti

Bankastræti (Icelandic pronunciation: [ˈpauŋkaˌstraiːtɪ], lit. 'Bank Street') is a street in Reykjavík's city centre which runs from the west ends of Laugavegur and Skólavörðustígur to the intersection at Lækjartorg. It has, since the nineteenth century, been one of the main streets of Reykjavík.

== History ==
With the building of a bridge over Lækinn, the stream running from Tjörnin along what is now Lækjargata, in 1828, Bankarstræti, along with the contiguous Austurstræti and Laugavegur, became some of the most important streets in Reykjavík. The street saw Reykjavík's first street light, an oil-lamp beside Lækjartorg. Since the earlier twentieth century, the street has been one-way. Since 2012, Bankastræti, along with Laugarvegur and Skólavörðustígur, has been pedestrianised during the summer as part of the 'sumar götur eru sumargötur' ('some streets are summerstreets') scheme.

== Name ==
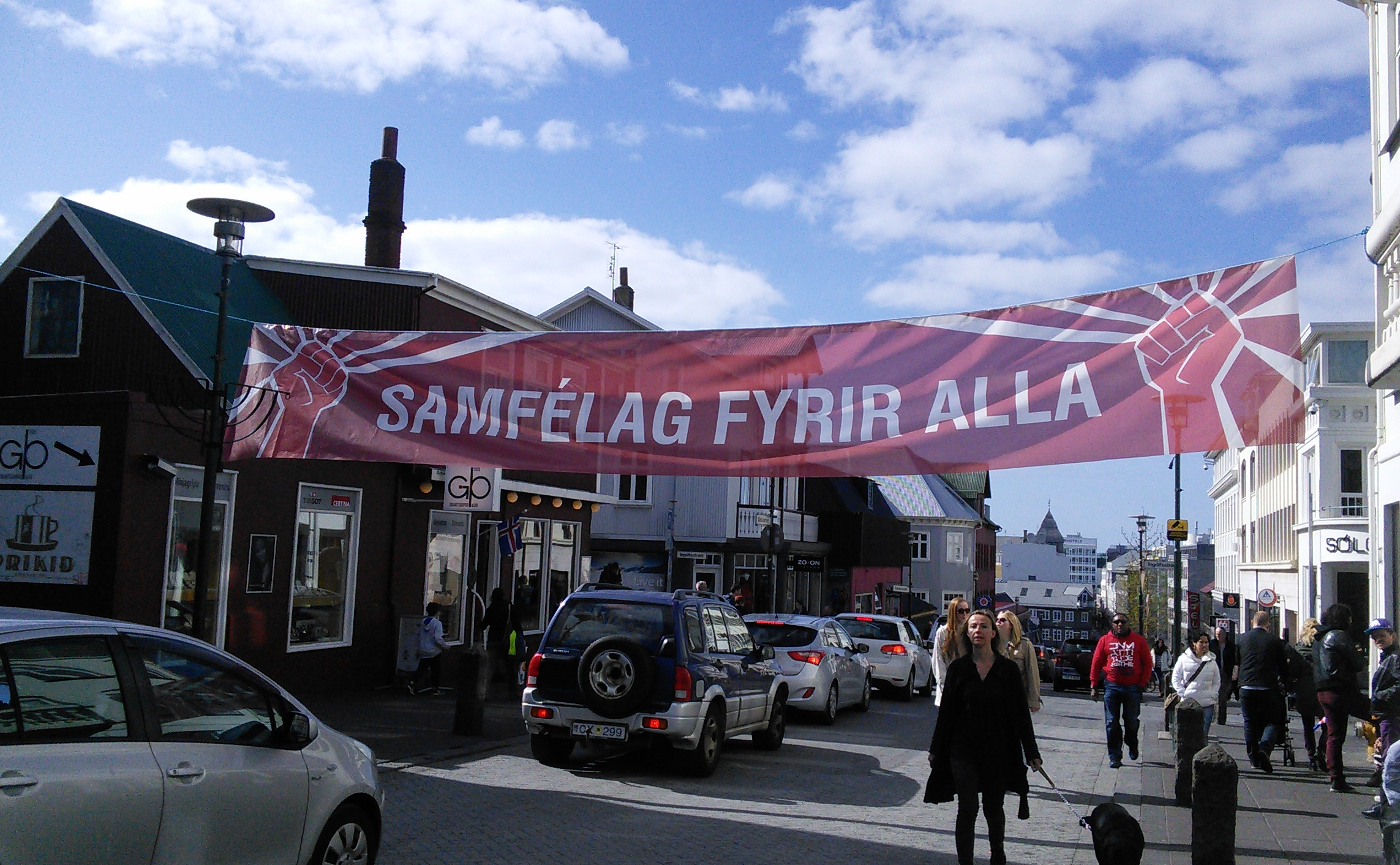
Bankastræti, Reykjavík, on Mayday 2014. Looking west towards Lækjartorg from Bankastræti 12 (on the left hand side) and 11 (on the right).

Bankastræti is now named after Landsbanki Íslands, which commenced operation at 3 Bankastræti on July 1, 1886. It was previously named Bakarabrekka ['bakery hill'], named for Bernhöftsbakarí [Bernhöft's Bakery], which was from 1834 in the old houses at Bankastræti number 2. The name Bakarabrekka is no longer used for Bankastræti, but is still used of the grassy slope below Bernhöftstorfan at the corner of Bankastræti and Lækjargata. The statue Vatnsberinn ('the water-carrier') by Ásmundur Sveinsson stands on the slope, along with a large outdoor chess set with pieces made by the sculptor Jón Gunnar Árnason.

== Public toilets ==
The street gives its name to the so-called Almenningssalernið Núllið ('Public Toilet Zero') or Bankastræti núll ('0 Bank Street'), a public toilet which is located at the bottom of Bankastræti before number 1. It is in two parts, the men's toilet on one side of the street and the women's on the other, underground, so only the entrance is visible at the surface. The toilets have been closed since 2006. These toilets give their name to Einar Már Guðmundsson's 2009 book Bankastræti núll; reminiscing about what they were like around the 1980s, Einar Már associates them with 'undirheimum, kulda, kynlífi, forvitni, bannhelgi, undarlegum manni í hvítum sloppi, áfengislykt, smokkum og hlandi, blóðhlaunum augum, rónum að pissa' ('the underworld, cold, sex, curiosity, taboos, a strange man in a white coat, the smell of alcohol, condoms and urine, bloodshot eyes, drunkards pissing').
