= Reykjavík Town Hall =

City hall for Reykjavík, Iceland

Coordinates: 64°08′45″N 21°56′32″W

Reykjavík Town Hall in 2018

Reykjavík Town Hall from across the Tjörnin in 2016

Reykjavík's City Hall (Icelandic pronunciation: [ˈrauːðˌhuːs ˈreiːcaˌviːkʏr̥]; Icelandic: Ráðhús Reykjavíkur) is situated by the Tjörnin (City Pond) in Reykjavík. It houses the offices of the mayor of Reykjavík and a large 3D map of Iceland. The city hall is sometimes used for art exhibitions, functions or live music performances.

The building was constructed in 1992 following an international competition won by architects Studio Granda.
