= Alþingishúsið =

Parliament building of Iceland

Coordinates: 64°08′48″N 21°56′25″W

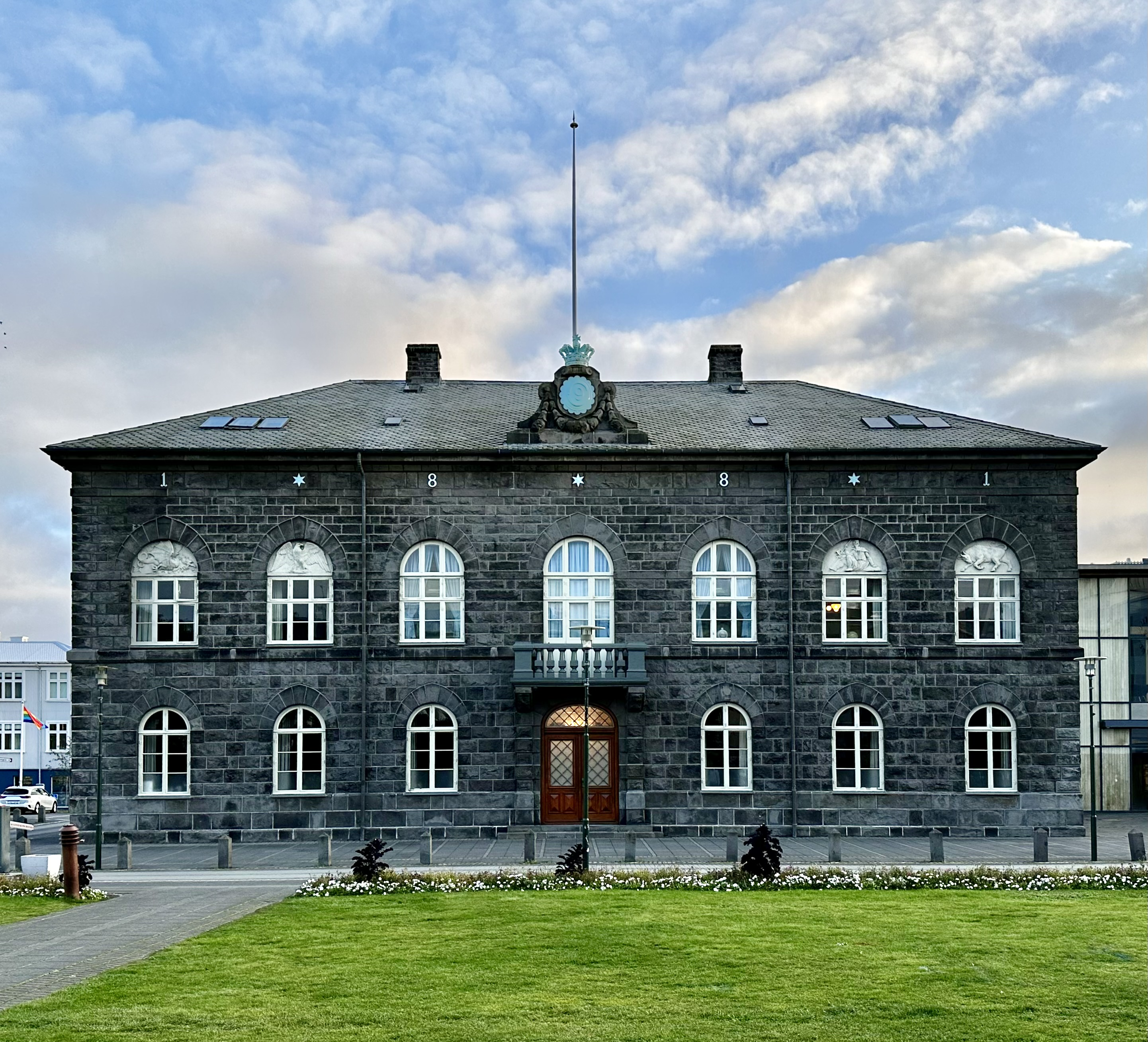
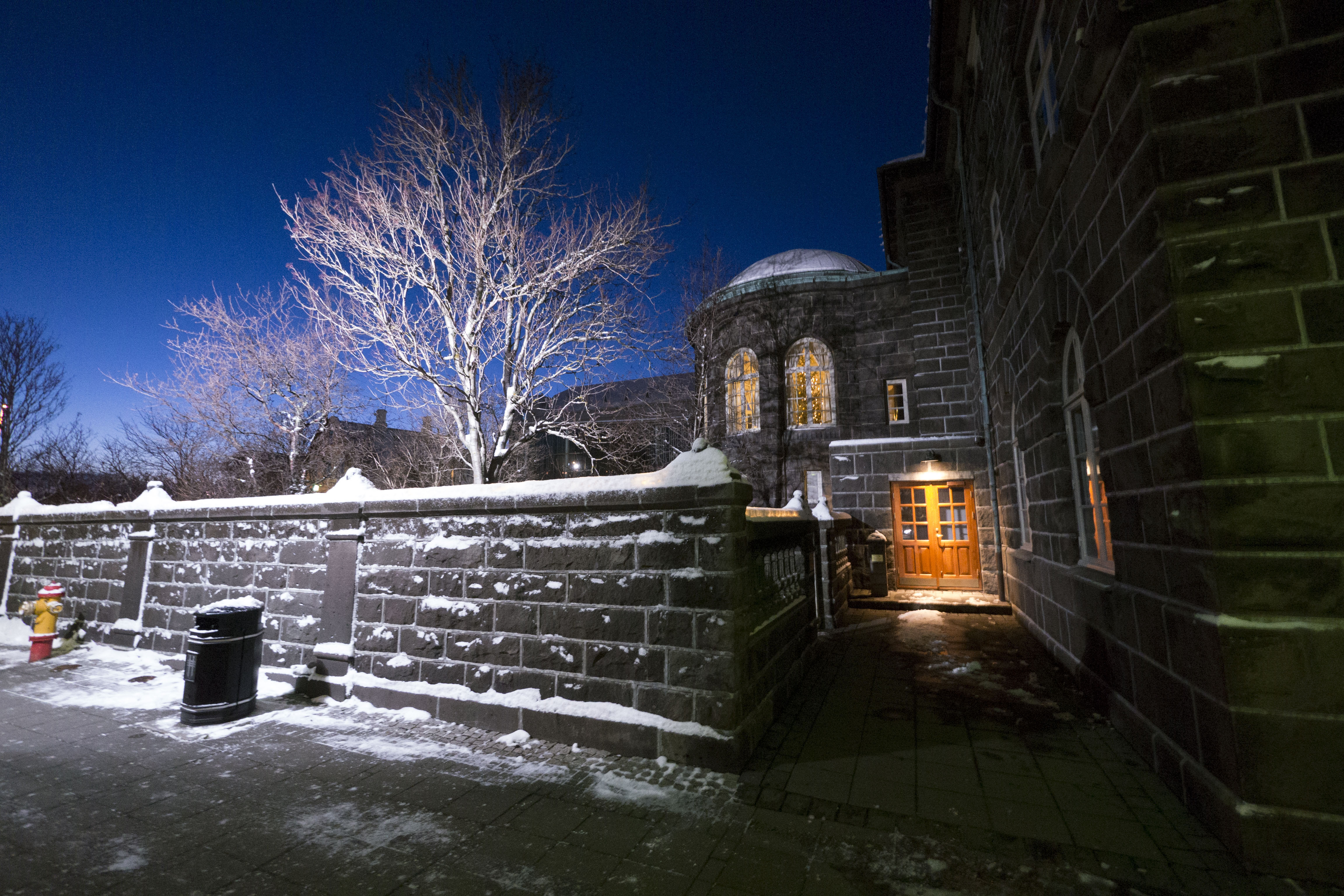
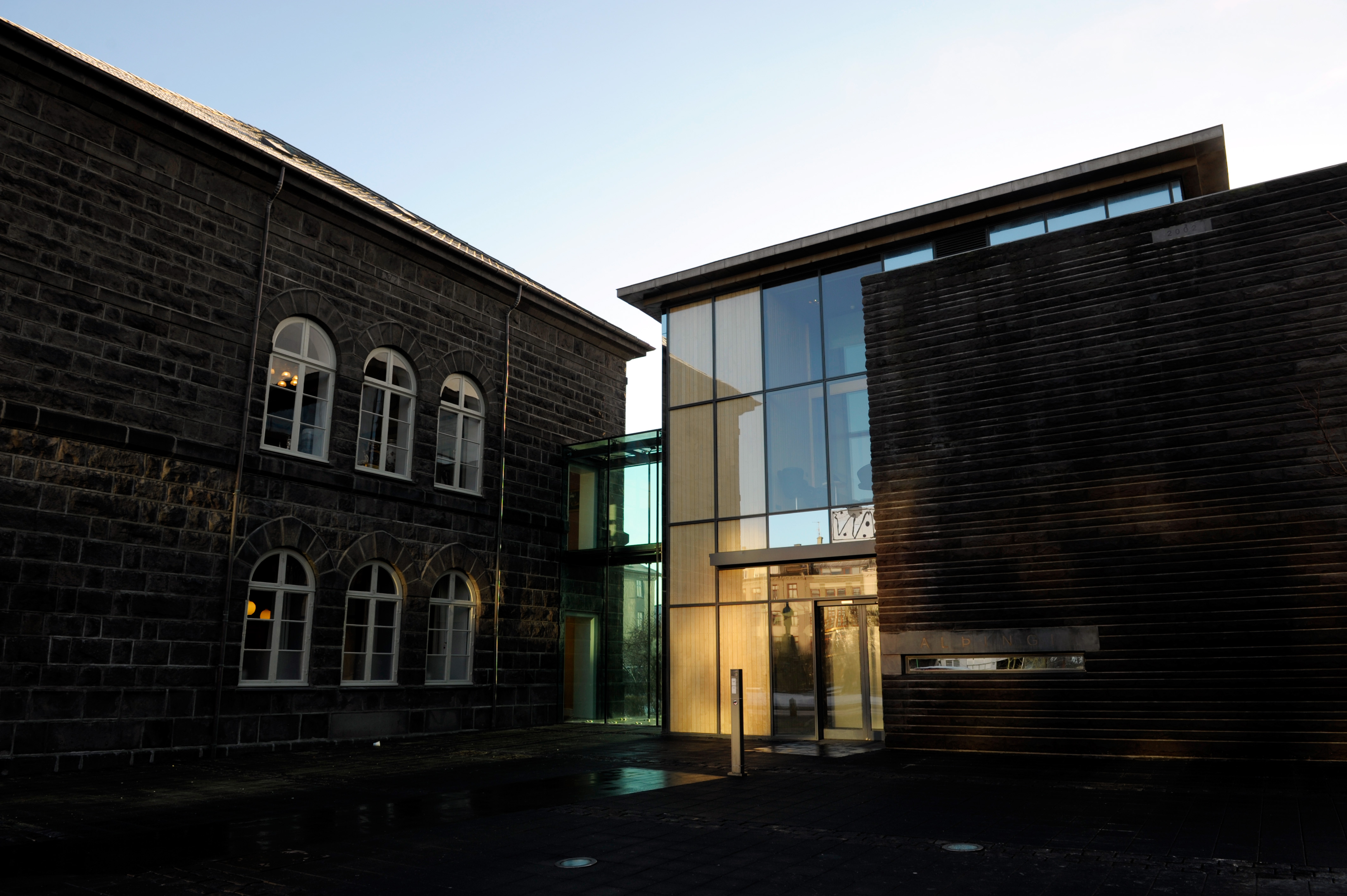
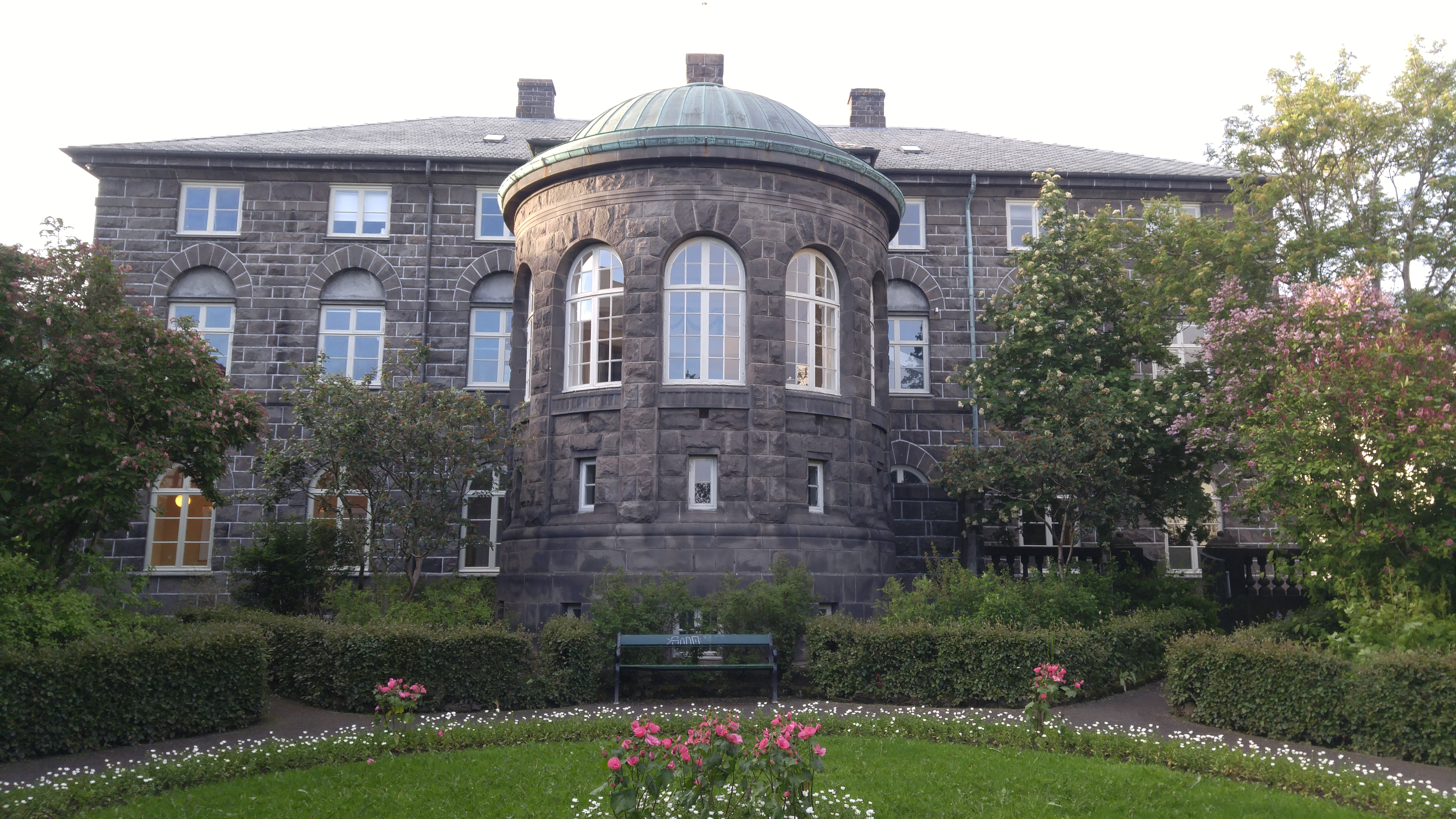
- Views of Alþingishúsið
- Interactive map of the Alþingishúsið area

General information
- Location: Austurvöllur, Reykjavík, Iceland
- Groundbreaking: 1879
- Construction started: 1880
- Completed: 1881
- Inaugurated: 1 July 1881; 144 years ago
- Owner: Republic of Iceland

Technical details
- Material: Hewn dolerite

Design and construction
- Architect: Ferdinand Meldahl

Alþingishúsið (Icelandic pronunciation: [ˈalˌθiɲcɪsˌhuːsɪθ], The Parliament House) is a classical 19th-century structure which stands by Austurvöllur in central Reykjavík, Iceland. It houses Alþingi, the Icelandic parliament. The building was designed by Ferdinand Meldahl and built using hewn Icelandic dolerite from 1880 to 1881.

The reliefs on the tympanums of the four outermost windows on the first floor represent the four landvættir of Iceland: a dragon, a vulture, a giant and a bull, momentarily appeased by Ingólfur Arnarson when he first landed in Iceland.

Alþingishúsið has also housed the Icelandic National Library and Antiquaries Collection, and later the Icelandic National Gallery. The University of Iceland used the first floor of the house from 1911 to 1940, and the President of Iceland had his offices in the building until 1973.

Today, only the debating chamber, a few small meeting rooms and the offices of some of the senior parliamentary staff are actually located in Alþingishúsið. Committee meeting rooms, parliamentarians' offices and most of Alþingi's secretariat are located in other buildings in the area around Austurvöllur. There are currently plans to build a new building to house these offices and meeting rooms in the area immediately to the west of Alþingishúsið, where there is today a parking lot and a few smaller buildings currently being used by Alþingi and which will be incorporated into the new building.
