= Hrómundartindur =

Volcano in Iceland

Highest point
- Elevation: 540 metres (1,770 ft)
- Coordinates: 64°04′N 21°13′W

Geology
- Mountain type: central volcano
- Last eruption: 3500 BCE
- Selected geological features near the Hrómundartindur volcanic system (red outline) and its Holocene lava flows (violet shading). Legend: Other shading shows: calderas; central volcanoes; fissure swarms; subglacial terrain above 1,100 m (3,600 ft); seismically active areas; Clicking on the rectangle in the image enlarges to full window and enables mouse-over with more detail.

Hrómundartindur (Icelandic pronunciation: [ˈr̥ouːˌmʏntarˌtʰɪntʏr̥]) is a mountain in Iceland north of Hveragerði with an elevation of 540 metres (1,770 ft). It to the east of Hengill and is the central volcano of an adjacent 25 km (16 mi) long Hrómundartindur volcanic system, which contains the Ölkeduháls geothermal field. Like Hengill this area is close to the south-eastern triple junction of the Hreppar microplate, is seismically active, and associated with the Western volcanic zone and the South Iceland seismic zone. To the north-east are multiple tindars, and there is a Holocene lava flow called Tjarnahnúkshraun which covers 4 km^{2} (1.5 sq mi) with a volume of 0.03 km^{3} (0.0072 cu mi). The lava ranges from picrite basalt, being predominantly tholeiite basalt with some basaltic andesite.

== Activity ==
During 2017 and 2018 GPS and seismic studies were consistent with either hydrothermal fluid or magma increase at a depth of approximately 5–7 km (3.1–4.3 mi) within the inferred brittle-ductile transition zone of the area centred at Ölkelduháls, between Hengill and Hrómundartindur. This volume had been contracting between 2006–2017, and was about 3 km (1.9 mi) north-west from an area of uplift between 1993 and 1999.

== See also ==
- Volcanism of Iceland
  - List of volcanic eruptions in Iceland
  - List of volcanoes in Iceland
