= Fremrinámur =

Volcano in Iceland

- Location within Iceland

Highest point
- Elevation: 939 m (3,081 ft)
- Listing: List of volcanoes in Iceland
- Coordinates: 65°25′47″N 16°39′00″W

Geology
- Mountain type: Volcanic caldera
- Last eruption: 1200 BCE (?)
- Geological features near the Fremrinámur volcanic system (red outlines). Legend: Other shading shows: calderas; central volcanoes; fissure swarms; subglacial terrain above 1,100 m (3,600 ft); seismically active areas; Clicking on the rectangle in the image enlarges to full window and enables mouse-over with more detail.

Fremrinámur (Icelandic pronunciation: [ˈfrɛmrɪˌnauːmʏr̥]) is a volcano with a volcanic system located on the basalt plateau in Iceland. It is at the junction of the Mid-Atlantic Ridge and the Greenland–Iceland–Faeroe Ridge. It is one of five volcanic systems found in the axial rift zone in north-east Iceland. Its height is about 939 m (3,081 ft).

== Geology ==
There is a central volcano and a fissure swarm which is part of the Northern Volcanic Zone. The Fremrinámar volcanic system is about 130 km (81 mi) long, extending to the north sea coast, and up to 12 km (7.5 mi) wide. The last eruption was in 800 BC (± 300 years). However compositional analysis of at least one recent southern local lava shows similarities to lavas from the Bárðarbunga volcanic system and so eruption history local to the volcano requires further understanding. After the last ice age there have been two periods of local activity, with a large lava shield of more than 5 km^{3} (1.2 cu mi) volume in the early Holocene and at least three lava shields deposited between 5000 and 3000 years ago, including the 4 km^{3} (0.96 cu mi) Ketildyngja lava shield. The largest recent fissure eruption was 3200 years ago and produced the Búrfellshraun lava flow which is 75 km^{2} (29 sq mi) in area. Recent lavas have been tholeiite basalt but in the Pleistocene the central volcano erupted silicic lava and multiple tuyas and tindars were formed under the ice sheet. Associated with the central volcano is a geothermal field that is just above the top of the shield volcano deposits.

Tectonically the system forms an eastern limit to the faulting of the Tjörnes fracture zone. Other extensional faults in the northern 60 km (37 mi) have had seismic activity consistent with propagation of dykes without eruption in the Holocene.

== See also ==
- Volcanism of Iceland
  - List of volcanic eruptions in Iceland
  - List of volcanoes in Iceland
