= Grensdalur =

Volcano in Iceland

Grensdalur (Icelandic pronunciation: [ˈkrɛnsˌtaːlʏr̥]) is a central volcanic vent and mountain of the Hengill volcanic system in Iceland. The elevation is about 497 m (1631 ft). Its position is 64.02°N 21.17°W. It was active during Pleistocene.

== See also ==
- Volcanism of Iceland
  - List of volcanic eruptions in Iceland
  - List of volcanoes in Iceland
