= Esjufjöll =

Volcano in Iceland

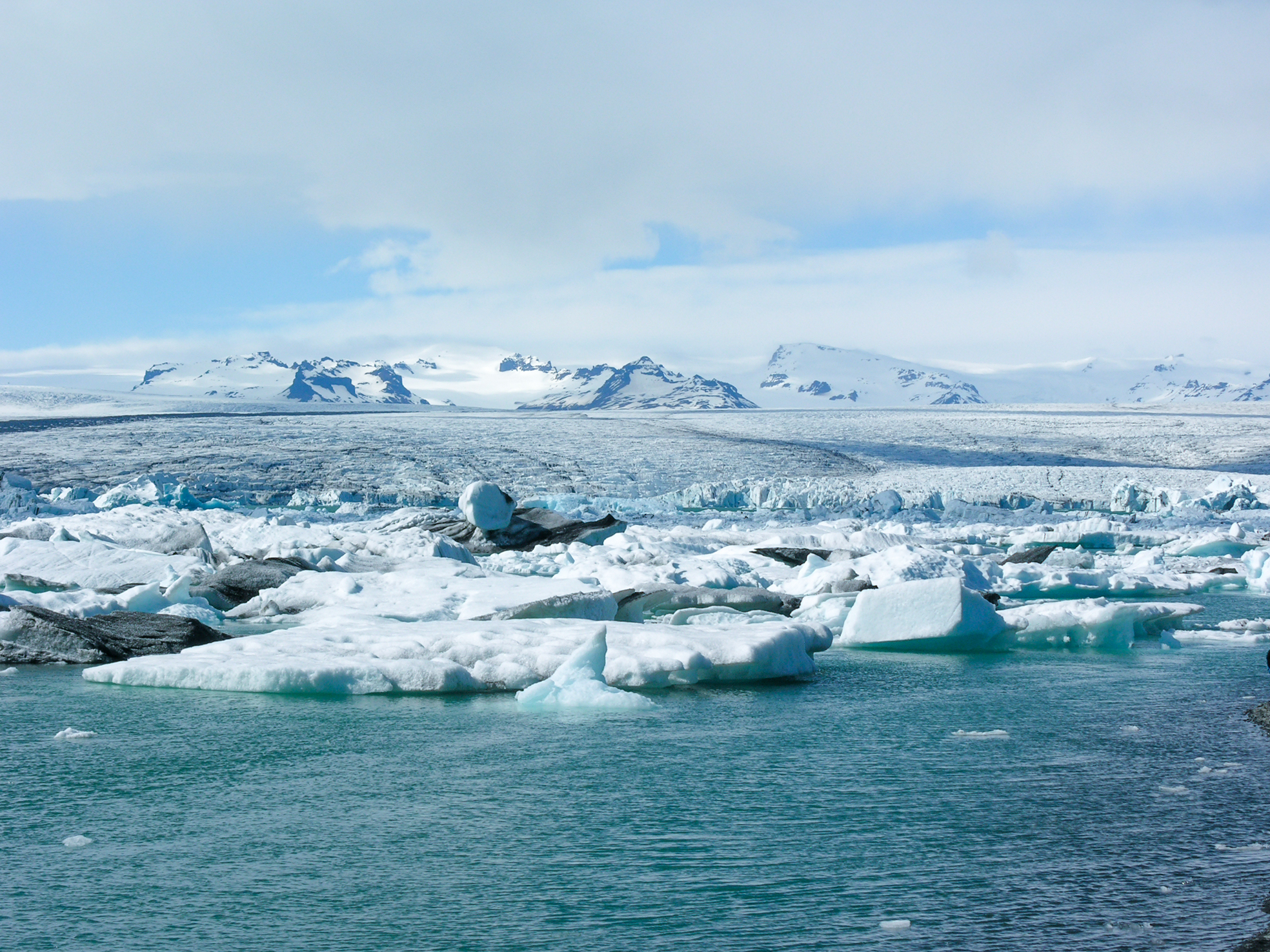
- Esjufjöll north of Jökulsárlón as nunataks of Vatnajökull glacier

Highest point
- Elevation: 1,745 m (5,725 ft) (Note: The historic assigned height of Breiðamerkurjökull as a glacier is 1,760 m (5,770 ft) Lidar studies confirmed this with an icecap (not bare rock height) ±5 m (16 ft). However the latest official source gives 1,745 m (5,725 ft) for Esjufjöll as the volcano so this height is used here as the mountain height.)
- Coordinates: 64.27°N 16.65°W

Geography
- Topographic features of Esjufjöll and to its south Öræfajökull. The Esjufjöll central volcano is outlined in red while the approximate outline of other central volcanoes are in brown. Nunataks have darker brown shading. Postulated or definite caldera features are in red shading. White/blue shading show glacier features relevant to jökulhlaup risk. More detail or zoom out to show other volcanoes in the Öræfi volcanic belt is available on clicking the image to enable mouse-over.
- Location: Iceland, East Iceland

Geology
- Rock age: Holocene
- Mountain type: Stratovolcano
- Last eruption: 1927?

The subglacial Esjufjöll (Icelandic pronunciation: [ˈɛːsjʏˌfjœtl̥]) volcano is located in the south-east part of the Vatnajökull icecap. Esjufjöll is a strict nature reserve (IUCN category Ia).

== Geography ==
The recognisable mountains associated with the volcano are nunataks within Vatnajökull. These are located about 20 km to the north of Öræfajökull volcano and about 20 km north-west of the Jökulsárlón glacial lake. The highest part of volcano is an ice-covered ridge called Snæhetta, whose assigned height is lower than previous figures, at 1,745 m (5,725 ft). The mountain range to this ridge's south consists of four nunatak mountain massifs called Vesturbjörg, Skálabjörg, Esjubjörg and Austurbjörg, in a north-west to south-east alignment, with three valleys in between them. In the second half of the 20th century, a number of small nunataks appeared as the more southern ice cover decreased; and two of the largest are named Bræðrasker and Kárasker.

The glaciers flowing around them are feeding the Breiðamerkurjökull, the most south-easterly part of the Vatnajökull icecap, immediately adjacent to Jökulsárlón, which it flows into. Breiðamerkurjökull, which had in 2010 an area of 906 km^{2} (350 sq mi), covers the volcano. There are three main glacial catchments, with the western arm draining the north western slopes of the Öræfajökull volcano, being separated from the central arm by the Mávabyggðir (Fingurbjörg), 1,439 m (4,721 ft), and Kárasker nunataks. To its west the central arm is associated with the Vesturbjörg and Skálabjörg nunataks and the eastern arm is associated with the Esjubjörg and Austurbjörg nunataks.

== Volcanism ==
Esjufjöll is a volcanic system and is part of Iceland's Öræfi volcanic belt. Also part of this zone are Öræfajökull and Snæfell (north-east of Vatnajökull).

The volcanic system consists of the Snæhetta central volcano with an assumed large caldera, but this has not yet been mapped well. Most of the volcano, including the 40 km^{2} (15 sq mi) caldera, is covered by the icecap. The latest data is suggestive of a volcano that may be 20 km (12 mi) in diameter and its northern part is underlain by a dense intrusive body. Satellite imaging suggests a caldera that may be 5 km × 3 km (3 mi × 2 mi). Vesturbjörg, Skálabjörg, Esjubjörg and Austurbjörg constitute the south-eastern flank of this caldera. Most of the exposed rocks are mildly alkaline basalts, but to the east there are rhyolitic rocks.

In the beginning of September 1927, a glacial flood (jökulhlaup) came down the Jökulsá á Breiðamerkursandi (a short river from Breiðamerkurjökull to the sea). The glacier run was accompanied by a sulfur stench. On one occasion, ash fall on the Breiðamerkurjökull was thought to have possibly originated from Esjufjöll. Although Holocene eruptions from Esjufjöll have not been confirmed, earthquake swarms that could indicate magma movements were detected in October 2002, and again in October 2010.

== Mountaineering ==
Ari Trausti Guðmundsson proposed a mountaineering tour crossing Breiðamerkurjökull and up on Lyngbrekkutindur.

== See also ==
- Volcanism of Iceland
  - List of volcanic eruptions in Iceland
  - List of volcanoes in Iceland
