= Snæfell =

Snæfell may refer to:

== Iceland ==
- Snæfell (Múlaþing), a mountain (1,833 m) north-east of Vatnajökull, in the eastern region of Iceland (usual use unqualified)
- Snæfellsjökull, a mountain (1,446 m) with its big glacier on top, in western Iceland, and several locations nearby
- Snæfell, Sveitarfélagið Hornafjörður, a mountain (1,383 m) south-east of Vatnajökull near Jökulsárlón glacier lake
- Ungmennafélagið Snæfell, a sports club in Stykkishólmur
- Snæfell/UDN, a football club in Iceland.

== Isle of Man ==
- Snaefell, a mountain
  - Snaefell Mountain Course, a motor sports track
