= Kollóttadyngja =

Shield volcano in Iceland

- Location within Iceland

Highest point
- Elevation: 1,177 metres (3,862 ft)
- Coordinates: 65°13′N 16°33′W

Geography
- Location: Iceland

Kollóttadyngja (Icelandic pronunciation: [ˈkʰɔtlˌouhtaˌtiɲca]) is a shield volcano in the Ódáðahraun lava-field in Iceland. Its height reaches 1,177 metres, and it has a diameter of 6–7 km. The summit crater is 800 metres in diameter, but only about 20–30 metres deep. In its centre, there is a bowl about 150 metres in diameter with a depth of about 60–70 metres.

The mountain is located in the Nordhurland Eystra (Northeastern Region) of Iceland and is one of the 236 named mountains at Vatnajökull National Park.

== See also ==
- Fjords of Iceland
- Geography of Iceland
- Glaciers of Iceland
- Iceland plume
- List of lakes of Iceland
- List of islands off Iceland
- List of rivers of Iceland
- Waterfalls of Iceland
- Volcanism of Iceland
  - List of volcanic eruptions in Iceland
  - List of volcanoes in Iceland
