= Heiðarsporðar =

Volcano in Iceland

- Heiðarsporður
- Location within Iceland

Highest point
- Elevation: 1,222 m (4,009 ft)
- Listing: List of volcanoes in Iceland
- Coordinates: 65°25′43″N 16°50′14″W

Geology
- Mountain type: Rift volcano
- Last eruption: 300 BCE

The Heiðarsporðar volcanic system is located in northeast Iceland near Lake Mývatn. It is the source of numerous formations present in and around the lake, particularly in the form of pseudocraters.

== Geography ==
Heiðarsporðar (or Heiðarsporður) is a volcanic system in the North Icelandic Volcanic Zone. It has an embryonic central volcano that rises to an altitude of 490 m. To the south of the system, a series of tuyas reaches a higher altitude, with a peak at 1,222 m.

== Geology ==
A 15 km fault forms the backbone of the system. A crater located 1 km west of the fault axis formed 2,200 years ago. It reflects an effusive eruption that actually extended over 17 km, creating a vast lava field of 224 km^{2}, covering most of Lake Mývatn at the time. The explosive reaction created by the lava's contact with water led to the formation of pseudo-craters that can be found emerging from the current lake and surrounding areas. The eruption was very productive (2.5 km^{3}), allowing the lava to reach the sea 60 km to the north.

The lava emitted by the system is overwhelmingly basaltic, even exclusively so in the case of the most recent eruption.
