= Snæfell (Múlaþing) =

Volcano in Iceland

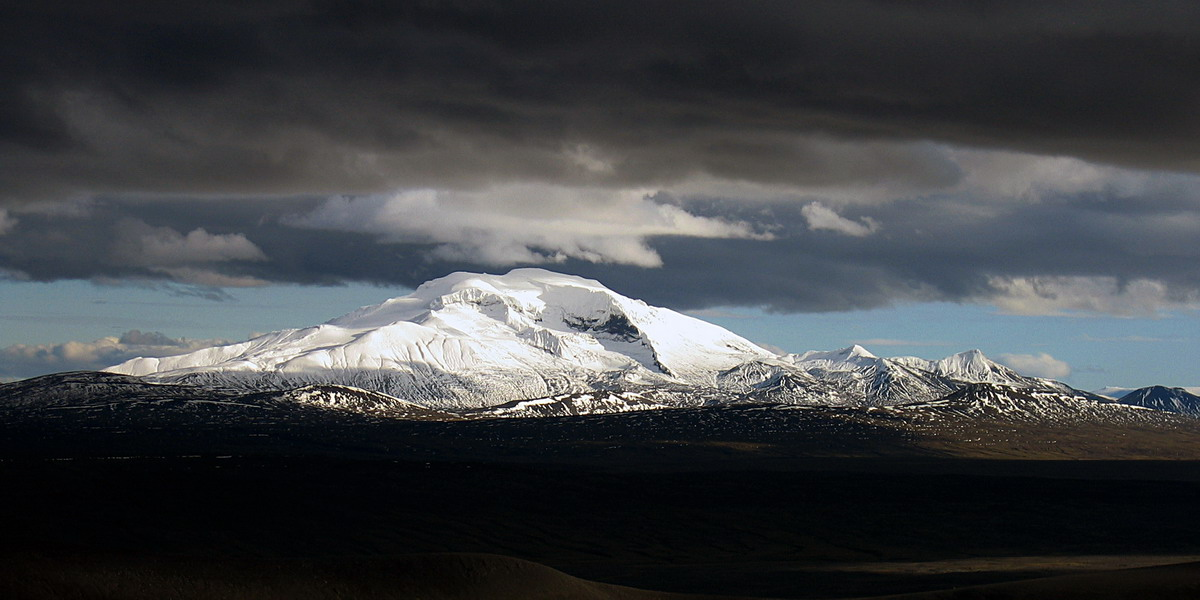
- Snæfell from Kárahnjúkar

Highest point
- Elevation: 1,833 m (6,014 ft) (Note: References to heights of 1,829 m (6,001 ft) at Já and 1,826 m (5,991 ft) in the Icelandic wikipedia can not be validated. Multiple official sources give 1,833 m (6,014 ft).)
- Prominence: 1,200 m (3,900 ft)
- Coordinates: 64°47′50.8″N 15°33′35.9″W

Dimensions
- Length: 27 km (17 mi)
- Width: 11 km (6.8 mi)
- Area: 170 km^{2} (66 sq mi)
- Volume: 48 km^{3} (12 cu mi)

Geography
- Location within Iceland
- Topographic features of Snæfell. The approximate outline of the central volcano is in red. White/blue shading shows ice cap. More detail or zoom out to show other volcanoes in the Öræfi volcanic belt is available on clicking the image to enlarge to full window which enables mouse-over. These features include other central volcanoes, nunataks (darker brown shading) and postulated or definite caldera features.
- Location: Iceland, East Iceland

Geology
- Rock age: Age Quaternary
- Mountain type: Stratovolcano
- Last eruption: 207,000 ± 10,000 years ago

Snæfell (Icelandic pronunciation: [ˈs(t)naiːˌfɛtl̥], "snow mountain") at 1,833 m (6,014 ft) high, is an ice-capped stratovolcano located in the north-east part of Vatnajökull National Park, Iceland. While it has been dormant in the Holocene, it is now known to have had repose times of over 100,000 years between eruptions, so it cannot be assumed to be extinct.

== Geography ==
The mountain is the tallest subaerial stratovolcano in Iceland, at 1,833 m (6,014 ft), and is immediately east of the Hálslón Reservoir of the Kárahnjúkar hydroelectric project and north of the Vatnajökull glacier with its Eyjabakkajökull tongue. Its ice-cap contains the following glaciers, from north clockwise:

- Sveinsjökull
- Sótajökull (to the east, now mostly melted)
- Dimmagilsjökull
- Axlarjökull (to the south-west)
- Ljósurðarjökull
- Grjótárjökull (to the west)
- Ljósurðarjökull.

It is the border between the municipalities of Múlaþing and Fljótsdalshreppur so the western slopes are in Múlaþing and the eastern in Fljótsdalshreppur. It is 80 km (50 mi) SW of Egilsstaðir by "road".

== Geology ==
Snæfell is the northernmost central volcano in Iceland's off-rift Öræfi volcanic belt, which is regarded by some as an eastern flank zone to the northern volcanic zone. Mostly Snæfell was formed under ice cover. In addition to the main mountain, the Snæfell volcanic system has a series of fissures and smaller subglacial eruptive features, oriented in a south-west to north-east direction (27°), almost parallel to the active northern volcanic zone, which is 45 km (28 mi) to its west. The associated fissure swarm, which was not recognised by earlier authors, has now been mapped to be 27 km (17 mi) long.

The basal tholeiitic basalt sheet bedrock age on which the volcano is built, is between 2.5 and 1.8 million years old and can be easily distinguished from the current volcano's magma source which is transitional alkalic, with no evidence of admixture with continental crust, as some had postulated might be the case. Recent work has suggested that the Upptyppingar subglacial volcano to its west has compositional similarities to Snæfell which helps the argument for a flank zone concept. Snæfell compositions have been studied in some detail as they help to understand mantle plume characteristics that may be related to the Iceland hotspot, and magma evolution.

The oldest basalt of the volcano has been dated at 1350 ± 28 ka, basalt at the summit is 256 ± 28 ka and there are multiple samples between these ages, with for example trachyandesite at 466 ± 40 ka. These are K–Ar ages and near summit rhyolite with a previous K–Ar age of 253 ± 6 ka was subsequently re-dated by the more accurate ^{40}Ar–^{39}Ar method to 207 ± 10 ka. The magma involved in the formation of the mountain must have come from mantle sources and uranium–lead dating of zircon is consistent with these datings. The magma has been found to have had residence times of between 100,000 and 200,000 years between eruptions, which is much longer than for other Icelandic volcanoes and means previous suspicions that the volcano might only be dormant, are more likely to be the case.

There is some hydrothermal activity at the periphery of the Snæfell volcano.

== Access ==
Access to the mountain is usually via Skriðuklaustur, a Vatnajökull National Park service centre, and when the park is open in summer via the F909 road that accesses the northern Brúarjökull and Eyjabakkajökull regions of Vatnajökull with a car park at the Snæfellsskáli ranger hut. The mountain top with its good views requires climbers to have special equipment and skills.

== See also ==
- Volcanism of Iceland
  - List of volcanic eruptions in Iceland
  - List of volcanoes in Iceland
