= Hengill =

Mountain range in Iceland

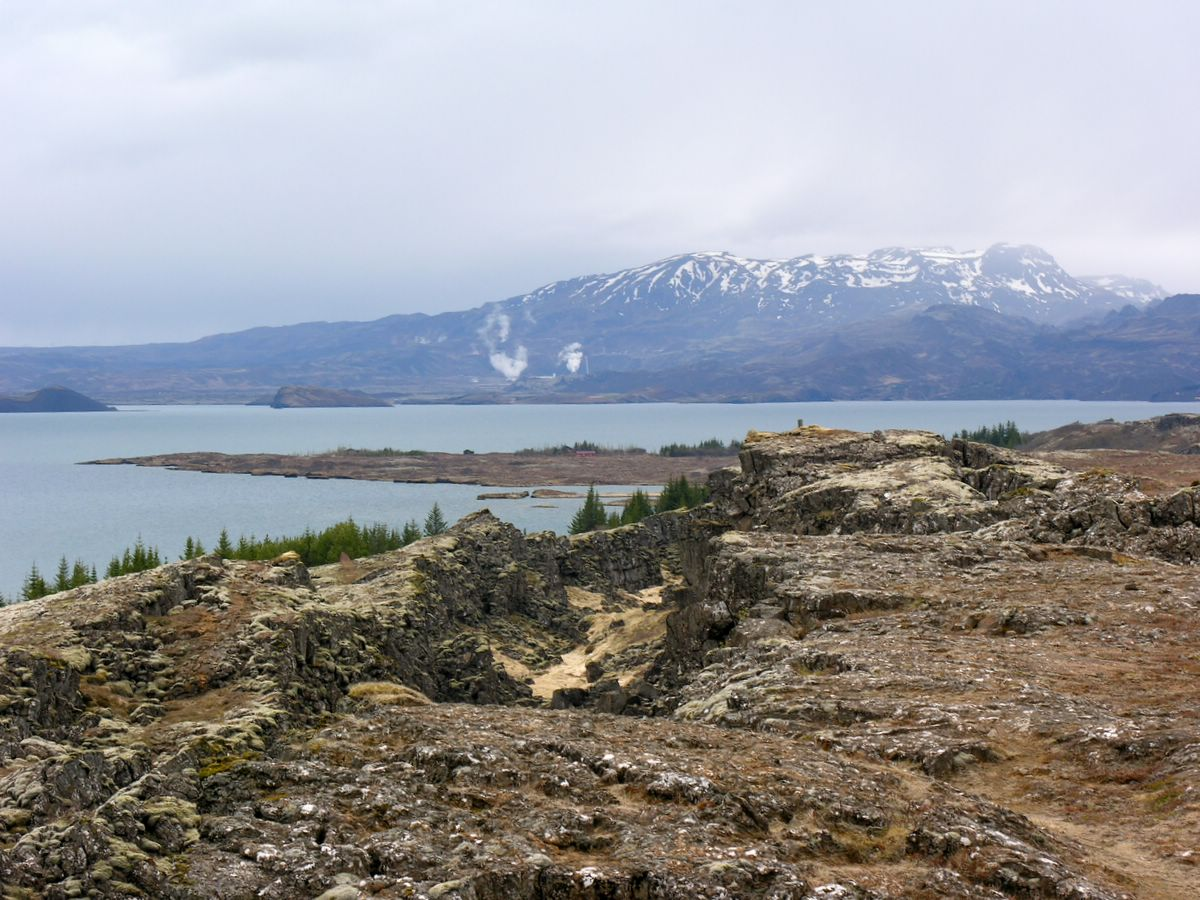
- Hengill, 2004

Highest point
- Elevation: 803 m (2,635 ft)
- Listing: List of volcanoes in Iceland
- Coordinates: 64°05′08″N 21°18′48″W

Geography
- Location within Iceland
- Selected geological features near Hengill (red outline). Legend: Other shading shows: calderas; central volcanoes; fissure swarms; subglacial terrain above 1,100 m (3,600 ft); seismically active areas; Clicking on the rectangle in the image enlarges to full window and enables mouse-over with more detail.
- Location: Iceland

Geology
- Rock age: 200,000 years ago
- Mountain type(s): Shield volcano, fissure vents
- Last eruption: 150 CE ± 75 years

Climbing
- Easiest route: Hike

Hengill (Icelandic pronunciation: [ˈheiɲcɪtl̥]) is a volcanic table mountain situated in the south-west of Iceland, to the south of Þingvellir.

The volcano is still active, as evidenced by its numerous hot springs and fumaroles, but the last eruption occurred approximately 2,000 years ago, before the settlement of Iceland.

== Geography ==
The mountain is south of Lake Thingvallavatn (Þingvallavatn in Icelandic), south-west of the Nesjavellir geothermal area, south of Þingvellir National Park and is the most prominent part of a volcanic region that extends to the coast. South of the mountain towards the coast is the Hellisheiði geothermal area to its south-west, and the town of Hveragerði on Iceland's main ringroad, Route 1 about 45 km (28 mi) east of Reykjavík. At the coast is the port of Þorlákshöfn.

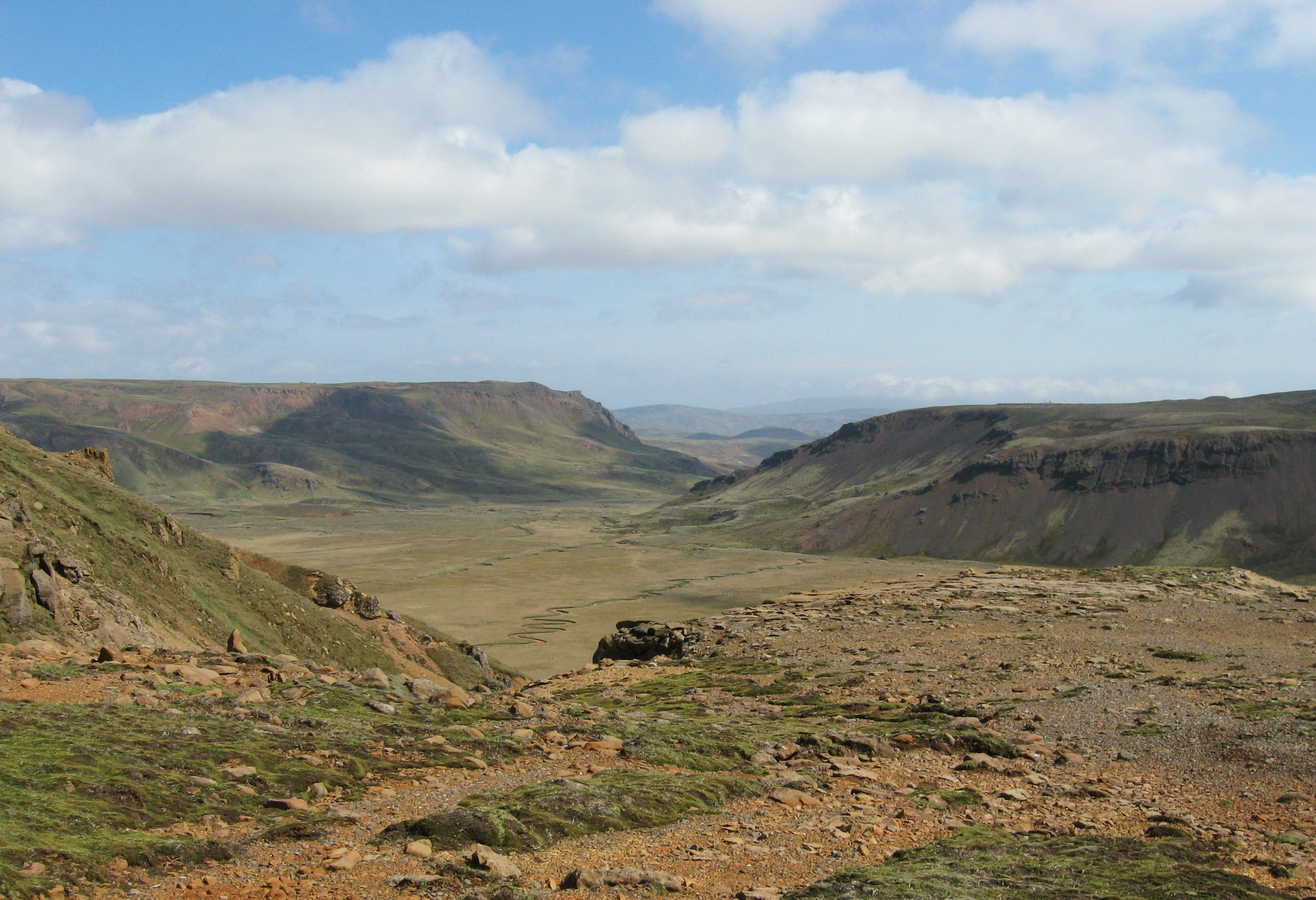
Overlooking the Hengladalir [ˈheiŋlaˌtaːlɪr̥] valleys to the east of Hengill

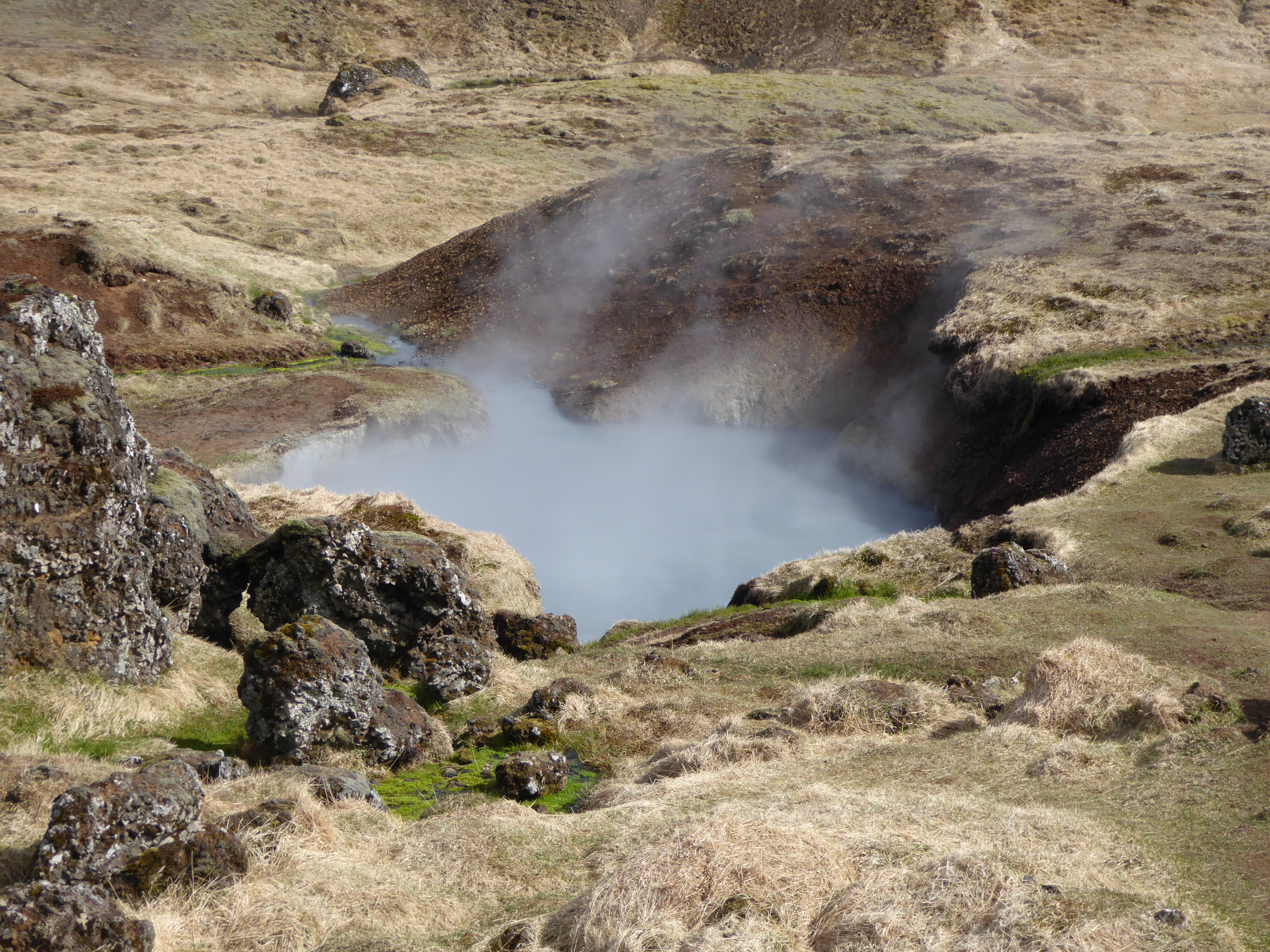
A hot spring at the base of the Hengladalir valleys

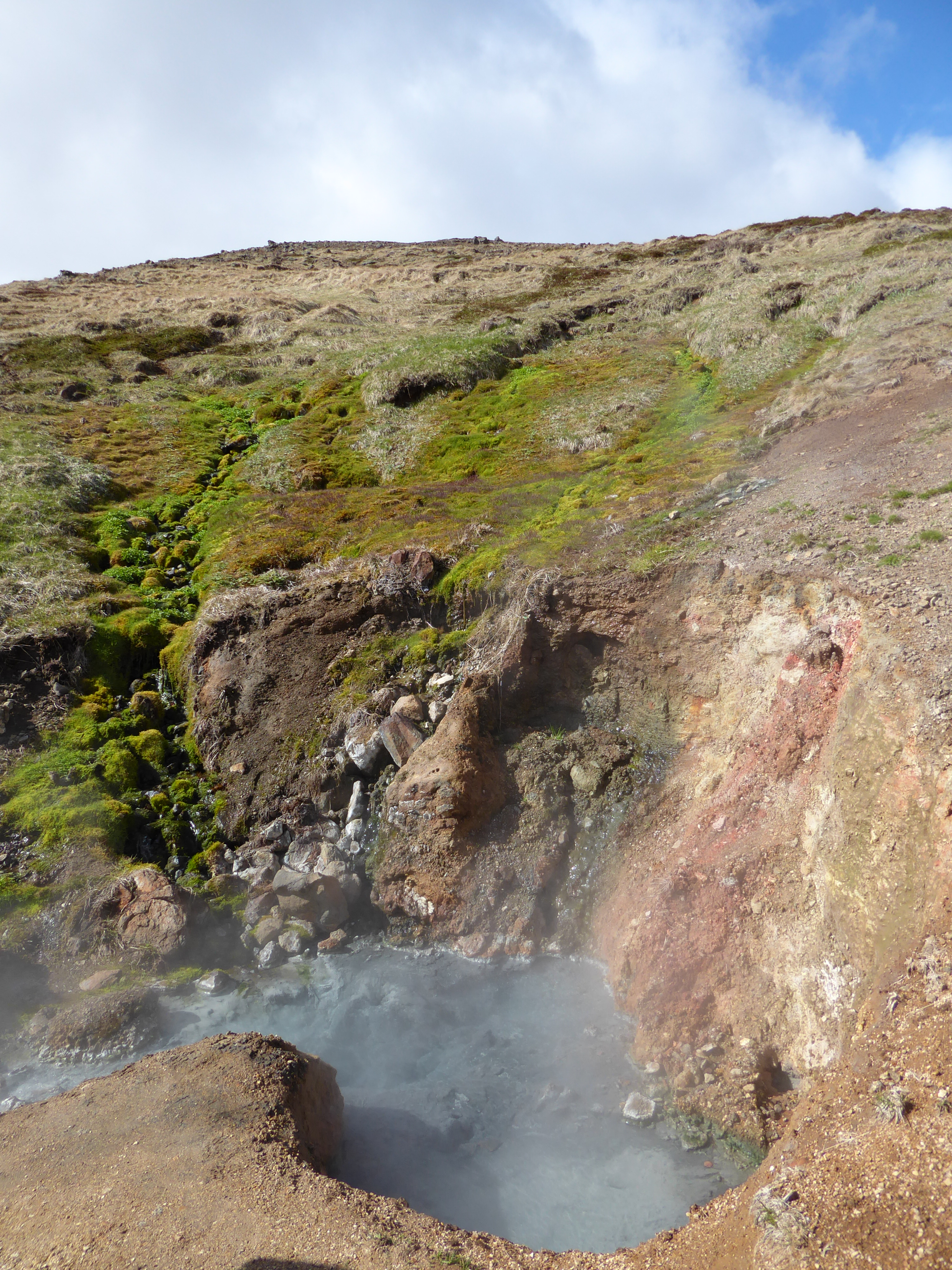
A hot spring at the base of the Hengladalir valleys

== Geology ==
The mountain is part of the 60 km (37 mi) long Hengill volcanic system, which is part of the Reykjanes volcanic belt, and is a hyaloclastite massif of tuyas and tindars. The dominant lava in the Hengill volcanic system is tholeiitic basalt, but andesite and about 20 km^{2} (7.7 sq mi) rhyolite occur within the central mountain. The largest lava shield covers about 50 km^{2} (19 sq mi). Four small lava shields are picrite basalt and one lava shield contains about 3 km^{3} (0.72 cu mi)of olivine tholeiite. It is located at the intersection with two other tectonic volcanic systems, the West volcanic zone of Iceland and South Iceland seismic zone, and is co-located to the plate boundary between the North American, Eurasian and Hreppar plates. This intersection is called the Hengill triple junction.

Hveragerdi to the south is a volcano in the volcanic system that became extinct 300,000 years ago, but still has significant seismic activity. It can be regarded as a predecessor volcano. This seismic activity is significant not only because of human impact but also because the earthquakes are grouped along faults striking north–south or east–west, but not north to north-east, as might be supposed based on the surface geological structure and that the rift zone is deep as 3–9 km (1.9–5.6 mi) locally. The earthquake distribution has been interpreted to have defined the heat source of the Hengill volcano.

Extending to the north-east from the central volcano is a fissure swarm with a number of tindars associated with an asymmetrical graben. Lake Thingvallavatn, occupies the proximal graben, and has at its southern end lava flows from the mountain and has hosted explosive eruptions historically. Amongst the faults on the north-west side of the graben is the Almannagjá chasm which extends from the northern shore of Lake Thingvallavatn.

Towards the south-east from the mountain towards the sea is a lava covered plateau whose height is about 300–400 m (980–1,310 ft) with scattered higher tindars and tuyas.

During the Holocene volcanic eruptions in the zone have been predominantly effusive and basaltic with minor tephra production. Erupted lava volumes have ranged from 0.05–3 km^{3} (0.012–0.720 cu mi).

Hengill area recent tectonic history
Date	Event	Comment
2008 CE	Earthquake	No loss of life but 50% property damage in Ölfus region
1789 CE	Subsurface dyke intrusion	Dyke injection later identified
1000 CE	Adjacent volcanic system eruption	Fissure west of Hengill, in the Brennisteinsfjöll volcanic system. This eruption was at the time of a meeting of the Icelandic parliament at Thingvellir.
150±75 CE	Eruption	Along a fissure length of 27 km (17 mi) and about 30 km^{2} (12 sq mi) lava erupted. Included phreatomagmatic eruption from lake Thingvallavatn.
80±75 BCE	Eruption	
1730±50 BCE	Eruption	
~3250 BCE	Eruption	
~3750 BCE	Eruption	Along a fissure length of 20 km (12 mi) and about 30 km^{2} (12 sq mi) lava erupted
~5000 BCE	Eruption	
~5550±500 BCE	Eruption	Not well dated
~7100 BCE	Eruption	
~7300 BCE	Eruption	
~7550 BCE	Eruption	
~8200 BCE	Eruption	
~8250 BCE	Eruption	
~8350 BCE	Eruption	

=== Risk ===
The official view of the volcanic hazard is that it is confined to a radius of 30 km (19 mi) and is related to lava flows, plugging of geothermal boreholes by lava, volcano-tectonic faulting and volcanic gas pollution. (Note: It is unclear why the known previous risks of either a phreatomagmatic eruption and/or of a rhyolitic eruption are not mentioned in this official hazard analysis. There is recent work suggesting the magma chamber may extend further in depth than past work suggested and this may or may not have been taken into account.)

There was either hydrothermal fluid or magma increase at a depth of approximately 5–7 km (3.1–4.3 mi) within the inferred brittle-ductile transition zone of the area centred at Ölkelduháls, between Hengill and Hrómundartindur to its east during 2017 and 2018. This volume had been contracting between 2006–2017, and was about 3 km (1.9 mi) north-west from an area of uplift between 1993 and 1999.

== Geothermal resources ==
There are three associated geothermal areas related to the high amount of fissuring in the Hengill volcanic system producing high water subsurface permeability. These areas include Iceland's second largest geothermal field which now is an important source of energy for the south of the country. The three areas are:

1. Nesjavellir geothermal system, which is captured at the Nesjavellir power station near the western shore of the lake Þingvallavatn
2. Hellisheiði, which has the largest power station in Iceland, Hellisheiði power station, approximately 11 km (6.8 mi) south-west of Nesjavelli. Both stations are operated by Orkuveita Reykjavíkur (Reykjavik Energy).
3. Hveragerdi, whose hydrothermal waters have been used for greenhouse heating.

The area with its mountains and hot springs is well suited for hiking and there are a lot of hiking trails. The town of Hveragerði with its multitude of hot springs is also part of the Hengill area.

== Culture ==
Some folk tales are connected to the region. For example, in a folk tale collected and published by Jón Árnason in 1862, a young farmer is said to have killed the sleeping troll woman Jóra [ˈjouːra] while she lay in wait for innocent wanderers or horsemen on the trail over Dyrafjöll [ˈtɪːraˌfjœtl̥] north of Hengill. In another folk tale, according to some people, a woman's body found in the area was believed to be that of Halla, the wife of the famous Icelandic outlaw Fjalla-Eyvindur.

== See also ==
- Geography of Iceland
- List of lakes of Iceland
- Volcanism of Iceland
  - List of volcanic eruptions in Iceland
  - List of volcanoes in Iceland
