= Theistareykjarbunga =

Volcano in Iceland

- Location within Iceland

Highest point
- Elevation: 564 m (1,850 ft)
- Listing: List of volcanoes in Iceland
- Coordinates: 65°53′N 16°50′W

Geology
- Mountain type: Shield volcano
- Last eruption: 900 BCE ± 100 years
- Geological features near the Theistareykjarbunga volcanic system (red outlines). Legend: Other shading shows: calderas; central volcanoes; fissure swarms; subglacial terrain above 1,100 m (3,600 ft); seismically active areas; Clicking on the rectangle in the image enlarges to full window and enables mouse-over with more detail.

Theistareykjarbunga (Þeistareykjarbunga, Icelandic pronunciation: [ˈθeistaˌreiːcarˌpuŋka]) is a shield volcano in north-eastern Iceland with two fissure vents called Þeistareykjahraun [ˈθeiːstaˌreiːcaˌr̥œyːn] and Borgahraun [ˈpɔrkaˌr̥œyːn], and two cones: the 370 m (1,210 ft) Stórahversmór [ˈstouːraˌkʰvɛr̥sˌmouːr̥] and the 540 m (1,770 ft), 30 km^{3} (7.2 cu mi) Stóravíti [ˈstouːraˌviːtɪ]. They both are currently extinct, although there is evidence suggesting the potential for activity such as recent localised uplift and seismicity. The multiple vents make up the Theistareykir (Þeistareykir) volcanic system, with more recent evidence that the former classification as a shield volcano is better considered an embryonic central volcano with associated fissure swarm, as rhyolite has erupted in a limited area. The recent lava has picrite, olivine tholeiite basalt characteristics but before the ice age there were basaltic andesite and rhyolite eruptions. There is a central high temperature geothermal area with numerous steam vents and fumaroles. This has been utilised by a 90 MWe power station.

== Eruptions ==
There have been three dated eruptions, all VEI-0: the most recent eruption was around 900 BCE and the previous eruption was in 6800 BCE. Around 9500 BCE, an eruption produced approximately 18 billion cubic metres of basaltic lava.

== See also ==
- Volcanism of Iceland
  - List of volcanic eruptions in Iceland
  - List of volcanoes in Iceland
