= List of volcanoes in Iceland =

There are too many presumed extinct or now inactive volcanic features to list all of these below, so most monogenetic volcanoes can not be mentioned individually. This list of volcanoes in Iceland only includes major active and dormant volcanic mountains, of which at least 18 vents have erupted since human settlement of Iceland began around 900 AD. Subsequent to the main list a list is presented that classifies the volcanoes into zones, systems and types. This is in the context that there are several classification systems and many of the volcanoes may have separate shallow magma chambers and a deeper common magma source.

Where a major vent is part of a larger volcano this is indicated in the list comment. Since some of these vent eruptions have been very large, disruptive or been regarded in popular culture as a separate volcano they have been included in the list but where this is not the case it is not appropriate to duplicate or create entries. So for minor vent eruptions since human occupation see the more comprehensive list of volcanic eruptions in Iceland.

== Volcanoes ==
Name	Elevation		Coordinates	Last eruption	VEI	Notes
Name	(m)	(ft)	Coordinates	Last eruption	VEI	Notes
Askja	1516	4974	65.03°N 16.75°W	1961	5	Also known as Askja-Dyngjufjöll, or Askja-Hrúthálsar volcanic system
Bárðarbunga	2005	6515	64.64°N 17.56°W	2014–2015	6	Also known as Bardarbunga and Veiðivötn
Brennisteinsfjöll	626	2054	63.92°N 21.83°W	1341 (± 1 year)	2	Also known as Bláfjöll and Brennisteinsfjoll
Eldfell	279	915	63.43°N 20.25°W	1973	3	A vent in the Vestmannaeyjar, or Eyjar volcanic system. It is a volcanic cone on the island of Heimaey.
Eldey	70	230	63.733°N 23°W	1926	3 or 4 (Disputed)	Also known as Eldey and Geirfuglasker volcanic systems. This is classified often in either the Reykjanes volcanic system or as part of the Reykjanes Ridge. In the later context an eruption may have occurred as recently as 1970
Eldgjá	ca 800	ca 2625	64.24°N 18.37°W	934	6	Also known as Katla, Mýrdalsjökull A large eruptive fissure of the Katla volcano.
Eldvörp–Svartsengi	230	755	63.87°N 22.40°W	2025, ongoing	-	Also Sundhnúkur crater row (Sundhnúkagígaröðin). Is part of Svartsengi volcanic system but this has been classified by some with the Reykjanes volcanic system.
Esjufjöll	1760	5774	64.27°N 16.65°W	1927	-	Also known as Esjufjoll
Eyjafjallajökull	1666	5466	63.63°N 19.62°W	2010	4	Also known as Eyjafjallajokull
Fagradalsfjall	385	1263	63.89°N 22.27°W	2023	0	Also has been classified as part of Krýsuvík-Trölladyngja volcanic system.
Fremrinámur	939	3081	65.43°N 16.65°W	800 BCE (± 300 years)	0	Also known as Fremrinámar and Fremrinamur.
Grensdalur	497	1631	64.02°N 21.17°W	dormant	-	Active during Pleistocene, it is part of the Hengill volcanic system.
Grímsnes	214	702	64.03°N 20.87°W	~3500 BCE	3	Also known as Grimsnes
Grímsvötn	1725	5659	64.42°N 17.33°W	2011	4	Also known as Grimsvotn and Grímsvötn-Laki.
Heiðarsporðar	490	5659	65.583°N 16.817°W	200 BCE	4	Also known as Heidarspordar and Heiðarsporður
Hekla	1491	1608	63.98°N 19.70°W	2000	3	Also known as Hekla-Vatnafjöll.
Helgafell	227	745	63.43°N 20.26°W	3950 BCE (± 300 years)	-	A vent in the Vestmannaeyjar, or Eyjar volcanic system. It is a volcano on the island of Heimaey.
Helgrindur	986	3235	64.866°N 23.283°W	Holocene	-	Also known as Lýsuhóll, Lysuhóll, Lysukard or Lýsuskarð. Has had two small eruptions between 1100 and 10,000 years ago but timings very poorly constrained.
Hengill	803	2634	64.18°N 21.33°W	150 CE (± 75 years)	2	Complicated volcanic system with largest volcanic vent Hengill, as at a triple junction.
Herðubreið	1682	5518	65.18°N 16.34°W	dormant	-	Active during Pleistocene. It is a prominent central volcano of the Askja (Askja-Dyngjufjöll, Askja-Hrúthálsar) volcanic system.
Hofsjökull	1782	5846	64.85°N 19.53°W	dormant	-	Active during Holocene. Also known as Hofsjokull or Hofsjökull-Kerlingarfjöll.
Holuhraun	778	2553	64.84°N 16.83°W	2015	-	Part of the Bárðarbunga (Bardarbunga, Veiðivötn) fissure system.
Hrómundartindur	540	1772	64.07°N 21.20°W	10,000 BCE	-	Not dormant as there was in 1994 magma inflow into its reservoir at 7 km (4.3 mi) depth. Also known as Hromundartindur
Hveravellir	1360	4462	64.75°N 19.98°W	950 CE ± 50 years	6	Northern central volcano of the eastern Langjökull volcanic system also known as Langjokull, Oddnýjarhnjúkur-Langjökull, Oddnyjarhnjukur-Langjokull, and Skjaldbreiður (southern part) volcanoes.
Hverfjall	420	1378	65.36°N 16.53°W	~500 BCE	-	Tuff ring in the Krafla fissure system.
Jólnir	70*	230*	63.30°N 20.63°W	1966	-	A vent in the Vestmannaeyjar, or Eyjar volcanic system. This vent of Surtsey has since eroded to below sea level.
Katla	1512	4961	63.63°N 19.05°W	1918	5	{ Also known as Katla, Mýrdalsjökull
Kerlingarfjöll	1488	4882	64.63°N 19.32°W	dormant	-	Active during Holocene. The stratovolcano of Hofsjökull or Hofsjökull-Kerlingarfjöll.
Kolbeinsey Ridge	5	16	66.67°N 18.50°W	1755	2(?)	Continuation to north of Mid-Atlantic Ridge
Kollóttadyngja	1177	3825	65.22°N 16.55°W	unknown	-	The shield volcano associated with Askja (Askja-Dyngjufjöll, Askja-Hrúthálsar)
Krafla	650	2133	65.73°N 16.78°W	1984	4	
Krýsuvík	379	1243	63.93°N 22.10°W	1188	2	Also known as Krysuvik-Trolladyngja, Krýsuvík-Trölladyngja, or Krísuvík
Kverkfjöll	1920	6299	64.65°N 16.72°W	1968	1	Also known as Kverkfjoll
Laki	1725	5606	64.06°N 18.22°W	1783-84	6	Part of Grímsvötn fissure system, so also known as Grimsvotn, and Grímsvötn-Laki.
Loki-Fögrufjöll	1570	5151	64.48°N 17.80°W	1910	-	Name of subglacial cone stratovolcano vent system of the Bárðarbunga (Bardarbunga, Veiðivötn) volcanic system, being the Hamarinn central volcano; the Loki ridge to its north-east and the Fögrufjöll ridge to its south-west
Ljósufjöll	988	3241	64.87°N 22.23°W	960 AD (± 10 years)	3	Also known as Ljosufjoll
Öræfajökull	2119	6952	64.00°N 16.65°W	1727	5	Also known as Oraefajokull or Hnappafellsjökull
Prestahnúkur	1386	4504	64.60°N 20.60°W	7550 BC (± 500 years)	-	Also known as Prestahnukur or Prestahnjúkur it is the central volcano of the western Langjökull system.
Reykjaneshryggur	-80	-262	63.67°N 23.33°W	1970	-	The 1970 eruption of Reykjaneshryggur (the Reykjanes Ridge) has indirect evidence and some would assign the 1926 eruption near Eldey as most recent as this was definite
Snæfellsjökull	1448	4751	64.80°N 23.78°W	200 CE (± 150 years)	2	Also known as Snaefellsjokull
Surtsey	174	571	63.30°N 20.62°W	1963	-	An island vent in the Vestmannaeyjar, or Eyjar volcanic system.
Theistareykir	564	1850	65.88°N 16.83°W	750 BCE (± 100 years)	-	Þeistareykjarbunga (Theistareykjarbunga) is a central volcano of the Theistareykir or Þeistareykir volcanic system.
Thórðarhyrna	1660	5446	64.12°N 17.0°W	1910	4	Thordarhyrna (Þórðarhyrna) is a central volcano of the Thordarhyrna Grímsvötn-Laki volcanic system.
Tindfjallajökull	1463	4800	63.78°N 19.57°W	dormant	-	Active during Holocene.Also known as Tindfjallajokull or Tindfjöll.
Torfajökull	1259	4131	63.92°N 19.17°W	1477	3	Also known as Torfajokull.
Trölladyngja	1468	4816	64.89°N 17.25°W	~2980 BC	-	Part of the Bárðarbunga (Bardarbunga, Veiðivötn) fissure system.
Tungnafellsjökull	1535	5036	64.73°N 17.92°W	dormant	-	Active during Holocene. Also known as Tungnafellsjokull, Tungnafellsjökull-Vonarskarð, or Vonarskarð
Vatnafjöll	1235	4052	63.92°N 19.67°W	750 AD (± 1000 years)	-	Also known as Hekla or Hekla-Vatnafjöll.
Vestmannaeyjar	283	928	63.25°N 20.17°W	1973	-	Also known as Eyjar volcanic system.

== Volcanic zones and systems ==
Volcanism in Iceland

Volcanic systems and central volcanoes in Iceland. Shading shows: likely active volcanic systems '"`UNIQ--templatestyles-00000169-QINU`"' fissure swarms, '"`UNIQ--templatestyles-0000016A-QINU`"' central volcanoes, '"`UNIQ--templatestyles-0000016B-QINU`"' calderas, '"`UNIQ--templatestyles-0000016C-QINU`"' subglacial terrain above 1,100 m (3,600 ft), and '"`UNIQ--templatestyles-0000016D-QINU`"' seismically active areas. Clicking on the image enlarges to full window and enables mouse-over with more detail.

Iceland has four major volcanic zones related a divergent tectonic plate boundary, and a hot spot:

- the Reykjanes volcanic zone (RVZ), subdivided into the Reykjanes Ridge (RR) (the Mid-Atlantic Ridge South of Iceland) and the Reykjanes Volcanic Belt (RVB) (on the main island);
- the West Volcanic Zone (WVZ);
- the East Volcanic Zone (EVZ) (extended to the Westman Islands, south of the main island as part off the off rift, South Iceland volcanic zone (SIVZ));
- the North volcanic zone (NVZ).

The Mid-Iceland Belt (MIB) connects them across central Iceland.

In Iceland's EVZ, the central volcanoes, Vonarskarð and Hágöngur belong to the same volcanic system; this also applies to Bárðarbunga and Hamarinn, and possibly to Grímsvötn and Þórðarhyrna. The classification of volcanic systems depends on volcanology studies and has evolved with time. For example, while Grímsvötn and Þórðarhyrna have similar eruptive compositions, as of 2020 Þórðarhyrna had not been studied in enough detail to have assurance that these are not two separate central volcanoes of two separate volcanic systems. The southern tip of the EVZ propagating rift is an off rift region called the South Iceland volcanic zone (SIVZ), that often has more evolved magma and thus explosive eruptions.

North of Iceland, the Mid-Atlantic Ridge is called Kolbeinsey Ridge (KR) and is connected to the NVZ via the Tjörnes fracture zone (TFZ). Also the South Iceland seismic zone (SISZ) is another fracture zone, which connects the EVZ and WVZ. Both fracture zones include their own volcanic systems, smaller than those in the MIB.

There are also two intraplate volcanic belts: Öræfajökull or Öræfi, (ÖVB) on the Eurasian plate, and Snæfellsnes (SVB) on the North American plate. It is proposed that the east–west line going from the Grímsvötn volcano in the Mid-Iceland Belt (MIB) to the Snæfellsnes volcanic belt (SVB) shows the movement of the North American plate over the Iceland hotspot.

=== Volcanic systems ===
Volcanic system	Volcanic zone	Other features	Name of central volcano of the volcanic system	Typical eruption style and notes
Reykjanes	RVB	Gunnuhver geothermal field	nil	Fissure swarm with effusive lava flows and phreatomagmatic/surtseyan explosive in sea with tephra. Crater rows with spatter, scoria and some tuff cones, lava shields, tindars and hyaloclastite hills. The Reykjanes and the Svartsengi volcanic systems are sometimes classified together.
Svartsengi	RVB	Þorbjörn	nil	Fissure swarm with effusive lava flows and phreatomagmatic/surtseyan explosive in sea with tephra. Crater rows with spatter, scoria and some tuff cones, tindars and hyaloclastite hills. The Reykjanes and the Svartsengi volcanic systems are sometimes classified together under the former name. Accordingly, volcanoes such as Þorbjörn have been assigned by authors to either name.
Fagradalsfjall	RVB	Langhóll, Fagradalshraun, Geldingadalir	nil	Fissure swarm with effusive lava flows. Crater rows with spatter, scoria and some tuff cones, tindars and hyaloclastite hills. The smaller Fagradalsfjall volcanic system is often classified with the Krýsuvík volcanic system.
Krýsuvík	RVB	Búrfell	nil	Fissure swarm with effusive lava flows, minor scoria deposits with long hyaloclastite ridges, tuya, and shield volcanoes. The smaller Fagradalsfjall volcanic system is often classified with the Krýsuvík volcanic system.
Brennisteinsfjöll	RVB	Geitahlíð peak, Bláfjöll hyaloclastite ridge, Vífilsfell, Hæðir shield volcano, Leitahraun shield volcano	nil	Fissure swarm with tuyas, hyaloclastite ridges and shield volcanoes.
Hengill	WVZ/RVB/SISZ	Grensdalur, Hveragerdi, Þingvallavatn, Hellisheiði	Hengill	Fissure swarms with effusive lava flows and minor tephra production from phreatomagmatic activity. The central volcano is a hyaloclastite massif of tuyas and tindars. There are multiple other tindars, tuyas and crater rows.
Hrómundartindur	WVZ	-	Hrómundartindur	Multiple rows of tindars and a recent lava flow
Grímsnes	WVZ	-	Seyðishólar	Fissure swarms with effusive lava flows, and mildly explosive magmatic tephra. Scoria cones or cone rows.
Haukadalur	WVZ	Geysir, Laugarvatn, Bjarnarfell	Laugarfjall	Rhyolite dome.
Langjökull	WVZ	Oddnýjarhnjúkur, Skjaldbreiður	Hveravellir	Effusive basaltic lava eruptions with jökulhlaups The Prestahnúkur and Langjökull systems have been classified together.
Prestahnúkur	WVZ	-	Prestahnúkur	Recently effusive basaltic lava eruptions but central volcano is rhyolite with ice cover so jökulhlaup potential. Clusters of tuyas and lava shields. The Prestahnúkur and Langjökull systems have been classified together.
Hofsjökull	MIB	-	Hofsjökull/Kerlingarfjöll	Double central volcanos. Recently effusive basaltic eruptions but potential for explosive tephra eruptions and jökulhlaups.
Tungnafellsjökull	MIB	Vonarskard	Tungnafellsjökull/Hágöngur	Small basaltic lava effusive eruptions recently but multiple rhyolyte domes and caldera structure so explosive potential.
Vestmannaeyjar	EVZ	Surtsey, Heimaey, Eldfell	nil	Effusive lava and phreatomagmatic. Multiple volcanic islands and sea mounts. Also known as Westman Islands, a central volcano may be developing. Is part of SIVZ.
Eyjafjallajökull	EVZ	-	Eyjafjallajökull	Explosive intermediate to rhyolitic eruptions with tephra and small basaltic, to silicic lava flows and jökulhlaups Is part of SIVZ.
Katla	EVZ	Eldgjá, Mýrdalsjökull	Katla	Typically explosive basaltic eruptions with tephra, and jökulhlaups Is part of SIVZ.
Tindfjallajökull	EVZ	-	Tindfjallajökull	Central rhyolitic dome with basaltic lava fields
Hekla	EVZ	Vatnafjöll	Hekla	Explosive tephra eruptions and fissure swarm effusive lavas of mixed composition. Often central eruptions feature a short plinian or subplinian opening phase followed by lava effusion.
Torfajökull	EVZ	-	Torfajökull	Explostive rhyolitic tephra and dome centrally but basalt effusive on fissure swarm. Fissure eruptions have propagating from Bárðarbunga volcanic system.
Bárðarbunga	EVZ	Trölladyngja, Veiðivötn	Bárðarbunga/Hamarinn	Explosive basaltic eruptions with tephra, effusive lava from fissure swarms and jökulhlaups.
Grímsvötn	EVZ	Laki	Grímsvötn/Thórdarhyrna	Explosive basaltic eruptions with tephra and lava with jökulhlaups. The Þórðarhyrna (Thordarhyrna) central volcano is not definitely part of the Grímsvötn volcanic system and may be a separate volcanic system.
Kverkfjöll	NVZ	Kverkfjallarani	Austari Kverkfjöll	Explosive basaltic tephra eruptions and effusive basaltic lava eruptions. Tindars, hyaloclastite ridges and fissures.
Askja	NVZ	Kollóttadyngja, Öskjuvatn and Kollur calderas	Askja (Dyngjufjöll), Herðubreið	Basaltic lava fissure eruptions with occasional large explosive silicic tephra eruptions. Double central volcanoes, shield volcano, rows of scoria/spatter cones, and some subglacial móberg ridges and associated tuyas.
Fremrinámar	NVZ	-	Fremrinámur	Usually effusive lava in range tholeiitic (picrite and olivine-tholeiite basalts) to rhyolite.
Krafla	NVZ	-	Krafla	Recently basaltic lava fissure eruptions, but historic caldera forming eruption on top of prior shield volcano over 100,000 years ago.
Þeistareykir	NVZ	-	Þeistareykjabunga	Recent effusive eruptions from central vents forming lava shields but some explosive activity. The central volcano has silicic rocks but picrite and basaltic olivine tholeiites lavas are recent.
Öræfajökull	ÖVB	-	Öræfajökull	Usually explosive tephra eruptions with jökulhlaups
Esjufjöll	ÖVB	-	Snæhetta	Explosive tephra eruptions but rare
Snæfell	ÖVB	-	Snæfellsjökull	Stratovolcano with rhyolites and evolved basalts and volcanic fissures with no recent eruptions put potential to reactivate.
Ljósufjöll	SVB	-	Ljósufjöll	Stratovolcano with recently only effusive basaltic eruptions. In past rhyolytic eruptions
Helgrindur	SVB	-	Helgrindur	Stratovolcano with recently only effusive basaltic eruptions. In past explosive silicic eruptions followed by extrusion of intermediate lava
Snæfellsjökull	SVB	-	Snæfellsjökull	Stratovolcano with effusive basaltic eruptions and infrequent explosive silicic eruptions followed by extrusion of intermediate lava. Occasional jökulhlaups

== See also ==
- Geology of Iceland
- Geological deformation of Iceland
