= Tindar (landform) =

A tindar is a ridge created by subglacial volcanism. It can contain pillow lava, pillow breccia, hyalotuff, hyaloclastite. Examples are Skefilfjall, Kálfstindar, Helgafell in Iceland and Pillow Ridge in British Columbia, Canada.
