= Geological deformation of Iceland =

- Land deformation
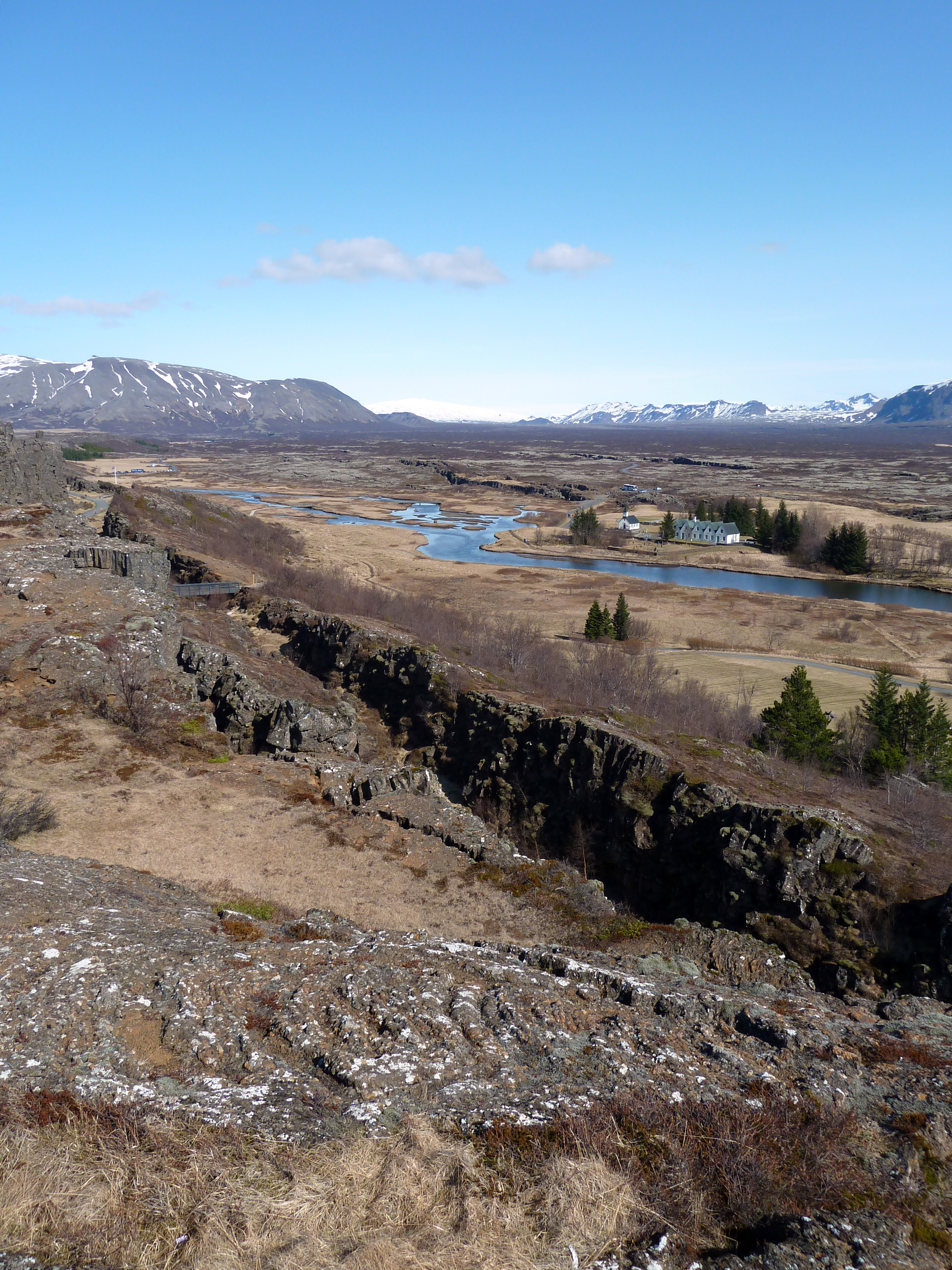
- Extensional structure, Þingvellir Graben, provides evidence for plate divergence in Iceland.

- Fig 1. Map showing the locations of the major deformation zones in Iceland and the vectors of the North American Plate movement relative to the Eurasian Plate. The legend for the basalt regions is the same as Fig. 2 below. Other legends: RR, Reykjanes Ridge; RVB, Reykjanes Volcanic Belt; WVZ, West Volcanic Zone; MIB, Mid-Iceland Belt; SISZ, South Iceland Seismic Zone; EVZ, East Volcanic Zone; SIVZ, South Iceland Volcanic Zone; NVZ, North Volcanic Zone; TFZ, Tjörnes Fracture Zone; KR, Kolbeinsey Ridge; ÖVB, Öræfajökul Volcanic Belt; SVB, Snæfellsnes Volcanic Belt
- Age: Age: Paleogene-Meghalayan
- Formed by: Tectonic forces

Area
  - Total: 102,775 km^{2} (39,682 sq mi)
- Volcanic zone: Mid-Atlantic Ridge, Iceland hotspot
- Last eruption: 2024

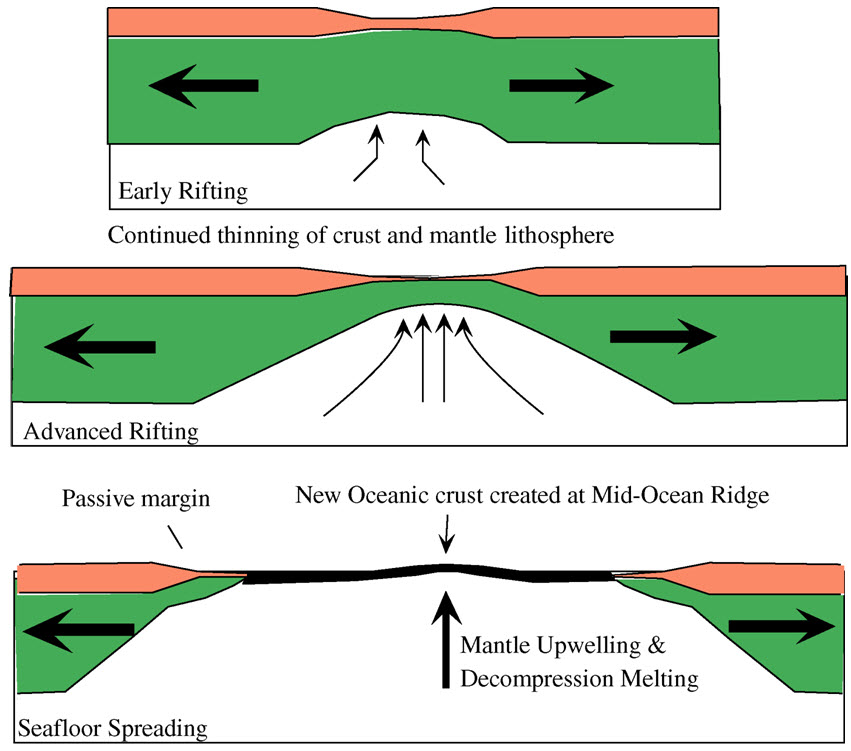
At its simplest the geologic deformation processes operating at Iceland are superimposed on the normal processes shown above at the mid-Atlantic Ridge.

The geological deformation of Iceland is the way that the rocks of the island of Iceland are changing due to tectonic forces. The geological deformation help to explain the location of earthquakes, volcanoes, fissures, and the shape of the island. Iceland is the largest landmass (102,775 km^{2}; 39,682 sq mi) situated on an oceanic ridge. It is an elevated plateau of the sea floor, situated at the crossing of the Mid-Atlantic Ridge and the Greenland-Iceland-Scotland ridge. It lies along an oceanic divergent plate boundary: the western part of Iceland sits on the North American Plate and the eastern part sits on the Eurasian Plate. The Reykjanes Ridge of the Mid-Atlantic ridge system in this region crosses the island from southwest and connects to the Kolbeinsey Ridge in the northeast.

Iceland is geologically young: all rocks there were formed within the last 25 million years. It started forming in the Early Miocene sub-epoch, but the oldest rocks found at the surface of Iceland are from the Middle Miocene sub-epoch. Nearly half of Iceland was formed from a slow spreading period from 9 to 20 million years ago (Ma).

The geological structures and geomorphology of Iceland are strongly influenced by the spreading plate boundary and the Iceland hotspot. Although some have questioned if a hotspot is necessary to explain the observed deformations of Iceland, this is currently felt to best explain observations of rock composition and age obtained by modern techniques. The buoyancy of the deep-seated mantle plume underneath has uplifted the Iceland basalt plateau to as high as 3,000 m (9,800 ft). The crust over the plume is also up to 40 km (25 mi) thick, which is much thicker than elsewhere in Iceland and a contrast to the minimum thickness of 8 km (5.0 mi), which is a thickness more typical of oceanic divergent plate boundaries. The central part of Iceland is still lifting, but the current rate of crustal lifting of 3 cm/year (1.2 in/year) is mainly explained by glacial isostatic adjustment in response to the retreat of ice since 1890, which has removed much weight from the thick ice sheet. The hotspot also produces high volcanic activity on the plate boundary.

There are two major geologic and topographic structural trends in Iceland. One strikes north-east in southern Iceland and strikes nearly north in northern Iceland. The other one strikes approximately west to north-west. Altogether they produce a zigzag pattern. The pattern is shown by faults, volcanic fissures, valleys, dikes, volcanoes, grabens, and fault scarps.

== Deformation of Iceland ==
The geological deformation of Iceland is mainly caused by the active spreading of the mid-Atlantic ridge. The Reykjanes Ridge south of Iceland comes ashore at Reykjanes, where all of the extension of the northern Reykjanes ridge (NRR) is accommodated in the Reykjanes Peninsula. At Reykjavík, towards the northern end of this peninsula, the relative movement of the North American Plate away from the Eurasian Plate can be modelled as 1.883 cm/year (0.741 in/year), but less than 60% of this divergence is accommodated by tectonic structures just to the immediate east of Reykjavík, with most of the rest being absorbed by tectonic structures in the south-east of Iceland. This is as other extensional cracks and transform faults are found perpendicular to the spreading direction. The transform-fault zones are also known as fracture zones. These fracture zones allow large volumes of lava to be erupted. The most productive volcanic region is located under the Vatnajökull glacier in the mid-east of Iceland, where all of about 1.853 cm/year (0.730 in/year) of extension is being accommodated near a plate triple junction. On the surface of Iceland, linear volcanic fissures formed along the rifts and appear in a swarm-like pattern. They are connected by fracture zones, forming the volcanic zones.

The Kolbeinsey Ridge assumes 100% of the divergence rate of 1.834 cm/year (0.722 in/year) measured near Akureyri on the north coast of Iceland, which compared to the vector in the south-east of Iceland is less and slightly more pointing to the north. Accordingly, in between, Iceland is being twisted slightly, and the tectonic structures are diverging more at the south than at the north.

Deformation has also been influenced by the context of glaciation and its retreat from around 3.3 million years ago. The historic subglacial volcanic eruptions result on the exposure, after the recent ice retreat, of distinctive flat-topped landforms such as tuyas, and rebound effects need to be accounted for in the seismic interpretations outlined below.

=== Plate boundary deformation zones ===
Crustal movements have created two plate-boundary deformation zones between the major plates, the North American Plate and the Eurasian Plate.

In northern Iceland, the width of the deformation zone is about 100 km (62 mi) wide. It accumulates strain which comes from rifting episodes and larger earthquakes. This manifests as the Tjörnes fracture zone (TFZ) off the northern coast.

==== Hreppar microplate ====
In southern Iceland, the block located along the plate boundary is identified as a microplate, and is named the Hreppar block or Hreppar microplate. Its current independent motion relative to the major plates was confirmed by GPS measurement. Internal block deformation is negligible since it has no significant evidence of active deformation, earthquakes, or volcanism; a propagating rift origin from the eastern volcanic zone (EVZ) is proposed with the western volcanic zone (WVZ) being the receding rift. The northern boundary of the block is linked to the Mid-Iceland belt (MIB), where diffuse volcanism occurs. The southern boundary of the block is termed the South Iceland seismic zone (SISZ), where strike-slip earthquakes can occur.

=== Transform fault zones ===
There are two major and active transform fault zones striking west to north-west in northern and southern Iceland. Two large fracture zones associated with the transform faults, namely the TFZ and SISZ, are found striking about 75°N to 80°W.

==== Bookshelf faulting ====
Bookshelf faulting mechanism: The transform fault is induced by strike-slip motion (sinistral movement) that is transverse to the fault zone. The blocks between the faults are slightly rotated afterwards, moving in a dextral movement.

Stress is built up during the spreading movements at the plate boundary. The accumulated stress in transform fault zones is released during strike-slip earthquakes. The transform fault is induced by strike-slip motion that is transverse to the fault zone. The blocks between the faults are slightly rotated afterwards. A diagram (fig.2) is shown to illustrate this phenomenon. Since the rotation of the blocks is similar to a line of books leaning on a bookshelf, it is termed bookshelf faulting.

Bookshelf faulting is an indicator of the young geological history of the fault zones. It is common in the SISZ and Reykjanes area.

==== Other evidence ====
Besides bookshelf faulting, the presence of the Icelandic fault zones are supported by seismological evidence. In Iceland, deformation usually concentrates over a zone of finite width. Thus, earthquakes usually occur along the active fracture zones between ridge crests. Most earthquake activity in Iceland is focused in the transform faulting zones near the north and south coast.

==== Tjörnes fracture zone ====
The Tjörnes fracture zone (TFZ, Tjörnes Volcanic Zone, TVZ) is a tectonically complicated area. It is perhaps best regarded as a trans-tensional zone with transform faulting and spreading. The TFZ is defined seismologically as an approximate triangle with apex about 67°N, sides about 120 km (75 mi), and base of 150 km (93 mi) off the north coast of Iceland, connecting the north Iceland volcanic zone (NVZ) and the southern end of the Kolbeinsey Ridge. This broad fracture zone is characterised by seismic activity, crustal extension, and transform faulting. The volcanic fissure swarms of the NVZ are connected to the southern end of TFZ. For example, its south-east end is connected to the Krafla fissure swarm.

The main structural components of the TFZ can be divided into three parts which trend from north-west to south-east: the Grímsey seismic zone, the Húsavík-Flatey fault zone and the Dalvík seismic zone. The TFZ shows a huge spatial difference in seismic activity. For example, the westernmost part of the TFZ shows seismic activity, but a few larger earthquakes (> M5.5) also appear in the zone. M_{S} 7 earthquakes have occurred in the Dalvík zone. Shear stress accumulated along the Húsavík-Flatey fault zone caused localized, tectonic rotation as evidenced by field and paleomagnetic observations.

The complexity in the TFZ can be generally explained by the magmatic processes and plate motions. The velocity of the divergent plate motion, estimated to be 18.9 ± 0.5 mm (0.744 ± 0.020 in)/year, is strongly affected by the Icelandic mantle plume underneath central Iceland. Volcanic activity can be found in the Dalvík seismic zone and southern tip of the Kolbeinsey Ridge.

==== South Iceland seismic zone ====
The South Iceland seismic zone (SISZ), also known as the Reykjanes fracture zone(s), is 75 to 100 km (47 to 62 mi) wide and strikes north-east to south-west in south-western Iceland. There are several approximately-40-kilometre (25 mi) right-lateral offsets of the ridge crest. The offsets create a transform fault zone connecting the EVZ and the Reykjanes volcanic belt.

There is a significant change in the age and lithology of the volcanoes in a north-south direction near Reykjanes Peninsula due to bookshelf faulting. Bookshelf faulting is common in the SISZ. Since the transform motion in the SISZ is left-lateral, right-lateral faulting would occur and rotation of blocks would appear counter-clockwise. The sequential occurrence of major earthquakes in the SISZ provided evidence of bookshelf faulting. Within a single event, earthquakes begin in the eastern part of the SISZ with larger magnitudes and end up with smaller magnitudes in western part of the zone.

In the transform fault zones of Iceland, earthquakes usually occur on small scales (micro-earthquakes) due to plate straining and pore fluid pressure. Pore pressure increase can induce seismicity. A large amount of pore fluid pressure migrates from the brittle–ductile transition zone at about 10 km (6.2 mi) to the lithostatic/hydrostatic boundary at 3 km (1.9 mi) depth. Large-scale seismic activity is triggered if the pressure cannot pass through the transition zone. Small-scale earthquakes are also released locally in or above the migration path.

In 2000, two large earthquakes at M_{w} 6.5 occurred in the SISZ. During these events, additional small—scale earthquakes concentrated narrowly and linearly around the transform fault planes. Thus, with the same method, small-scale earthquakes are also used to identify fault planes in the TFZ. These were followed by the slightly smaller 2008 Iceland earthquake.

=== Volcanic rift zones ===
Fig. 2 - Location of the volcanic rift zones and main volcanoes.

Many of the volcanoes of Iceland can be grouped by their relationship to rift zones and contribute to the understanding of the deformation that has taken place. Not all the names used to classify the volcanoes into groups are yet standardised, and not all the volcanic and tectonic relationships are well-characterised due to issues such as accessibility or less current activity.

==== Rift-jump model ====
The evolution of the Icelandic volcanic rift zones can be explained by the rift-jump model.

Synform folding is expected to occur at the active rift axis. However, distinctive reversals in dip directions are found in southwestern Iceland which indicate an anticline. It is believed that the relative positions of the Icelandic hot spot and the active rift-spreading axis have changed with time. Assuming the Icelandic mantle plume is stationary, the spreading axis must have changed position.

At least part of the spreading axis migrates at a rate of about 3.5–5 cm/year (1.4–2.0 in/year). After the active spreading axis has moved away from the plume, the mantle plume would adjust the position of the axis and form a new rift closer to its centre. The migrated axis would gradually become extinct.

There are three major volcanic zones in Iceland, which are the Northern, Eastern, and Western volcanic zones (NVZ, EVZ, WVZ), all of which are currently active. The volcanic rift zones cross the island from southwest to northeast. Each zone consists of 20–50-kilometre-wide (12–31 mi) belts and is characterised by active volcanoes, numerous normal faults, a high-temperature geothermal field, and fissure swarms. The EVZ will eventually take over the WVZ according to the rift-jump process.

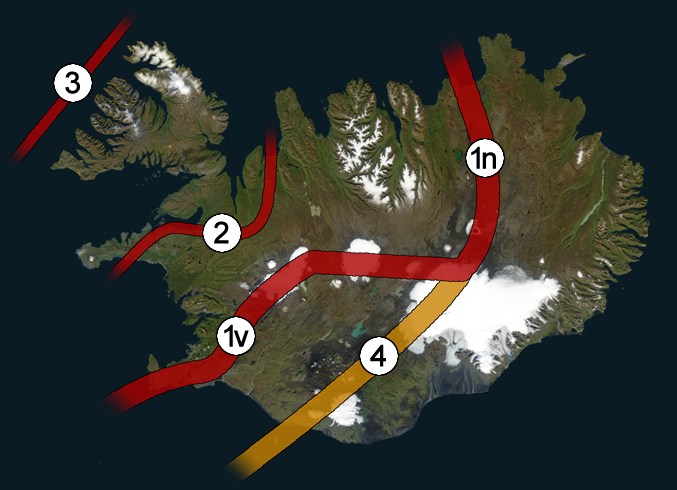
Historic major rift-zone jumps of Iceland. The oldest, Westfjords Rift Zone (3), is off the northwest coast. The Snæfellsnes-Húnaflói rift zone (2) became inactive when it jumped 6 to 7 million years ago. The Western volcanic zone (1v) is becoming inactive while the Northern volcanic zone (1n) propagates south as the Eastern volcanic zone (4).

==== Northern volcanic zone ====
The 50-kilometre-wide (31 mi) Northern volcanic zone (NVZ) is composed of five volcanic systems arranged zigzag-like along the mid-Atlantic plate boundary. It shows quite low seismic activity. The volcanic activity is confined to the Krafla central volcano and its associated fissure swarms. It accommodates the entire rifting of North Iceland and can be regarded at the present time to be in a steady state of spreading rate. There is a greater predominance of lava shields than in the other active rifting areas. The Icelandic shield volcanoes that produced these large lava fields here and in the WVZ did so in a single, almost-continuous eruptive process that is distinct from the repeated, discontinuous eruptions often seen in shield volcanoes elsewhere in the world and that would earn them the classification as a central volcano in the Iceland geological context.

The Krafla central volcano is not distinctive within the volcanic rift zone. Fissure swarms of the Krafla spread away from the magma chamber and magma flows along the swarms to the north and south of the volcano. Eruptive fissures within the fissure swarms are most common within 20–30 km (12–19 mi) from the central volcanoes. Fractures within the fissure swarms are common at up to a distance of 70–90 km (43–56 mi) from the central volcano.

Fractures within the fissure swarms are generally subparallel to each other. Irregular fracture patterns are found where the Húsavík transform fault meets the fissure swarms, which indicates interaction between the fissure swarms and the strike-slip faults.

The division between the NVZ and the EVZ is arbitrary, as the rifting structures are a single continuous structural identity. A potential boundary exists given the change in strike direction of the fissure swarms formed in the last 10 million years at latitude 64.7°, which was also followed by the 2014 dyke intrusion from Bárðarbunga towards the north, but this might be crossed by volcanic activity originating either to the south or north. North Iceland's last major rift relocation occurred about 6 to 7 million years ago when the northern, now-extinct Snæfellsnes-Húnaflói rift zone (SHRZ) shifted eastward to the new rift axis in the NVZ. There is with new dating techniques accurate understanding of SHRZ history from the northwestern region of Iceland to the northeastern that was not available when the SHRZ was first described.

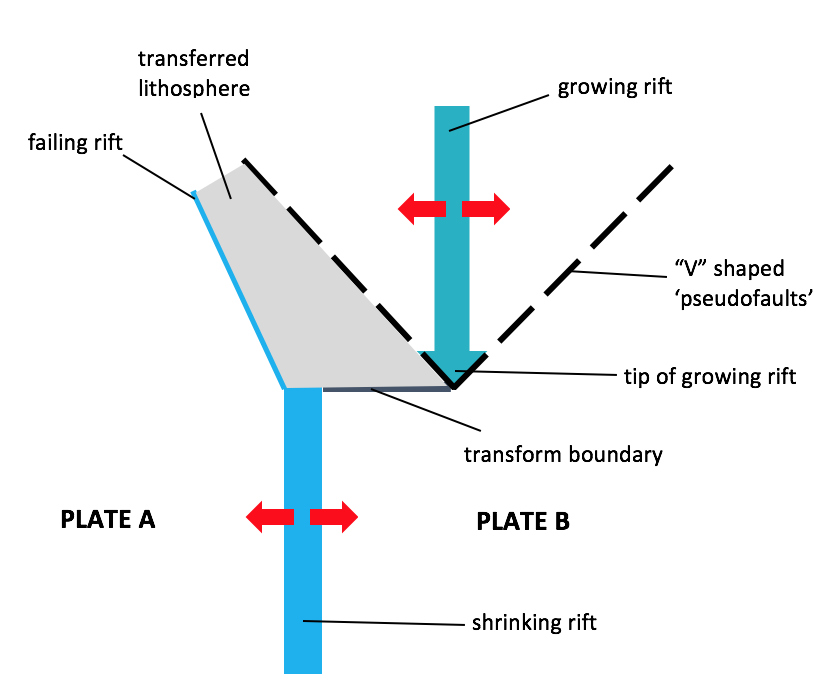
Propagating rift mechanism as mentioned in the text. While this applies to the southern EVZ in a north-to-south orientation in Iceland, the shrinking rift label is likely inaccurate in the Iceland context as it is discontinuous. The area in gray is analogous to the Hreppar microplate, and the transform boundary is the SISZ.

==== Eastern volcanic zone ====
The Eastern volcanic zone (EVZ) is located in south-east Iceland and has high volcanic activity. It connects to the SISZ and NVC in its western and northern ends respectively. Seismic activity focuses in the Vatnajökull Glacier area which is the accepted location of the Icelandic hot spot. The EVZ started forming between 1.5 and 3 million years ago as a result of NVZ southward propagation. It is the eastern boundary of the Hreppar microplate.

Deformed structures, including the dominant northeast-trending eruptive fissure swarms and volcanic structures, and some normal fault structures, can be found in the EVZ. Long hyaloclastite ridges, formed by subglacial eruptions during the last glacial period, are distinctive structures in the EVZ. Compared with the WVZ, eruptive fissure swarms and hyaloclastite ridges are generally longer in the EVZ. During the past glacial period, a huge volume of basaltic eruptions occurred, producing the long volcanic fissure swarms. The EVZ is geologically young; as mentioned above, the EVZ will eventually take over the WVZ according to the rift-jump model.

The southern EVZ is propagating to the southwest through older Eurasian Plate crust. This results in active, sometimes explosive volcanism, and rifting in an off-rift region called the South Iceland Volcanic Zone (SIVZ).

==== Western volcanic zone ====
The Western volcanic zone (WVZ) is located to the north of the SISZ, where its northern end connects to the Langjökull area. It has been the active propagating rift in the last 7 million years, but is now regarded as waning in active rift activity as the hotspot shifts eastward, and with the re-classification of the active volcanoes of the Reykjanes Peninsula from the WVZ to the Reykjanes volcanic belt (RVB), which is now regarded as a trans-tensional zone with transform faulting and spreading. Structures related to normal faulting are much more apparent than in the younger EVZ. The WVZ initially took over as the principle plate boundary in Iceland about 6 million years ago from its predecessor the Snæfellsnes Rift, which then connected western Iceland to north Iceland. During this period of activity, it was known as the Reykjanes-Langjökull rift zone, which propagated to the southwest. Until 2 million years ago, the seafloor spreading around Iceland was accommodated by this rift zone, an ill-defined transverse connecting zone between it and the NVZ.

As the EVZ became active, the Reykjanes-Langjökull rift zone became today's WVZ. The WVZ remains active despite being an ultra-slow spreading center with extension rates of 0.3–0.7 cm/year (0.12–0.28 in/year), which is 20–30% of the total opening across south Iceland. The discontinuous failing of the WVZ compared to other described failing rifts is evidenced by, for example, the middle and northern parts of the WVZ having more recent volcanic activity than the southern parts, which is not as expected for a rift failing from the north.

In the northern part of the WVZ, normal faulting is still common, but volcanic fissures become less dominant and active. The WVZ is the western boundary of the Hreppar microplate.

Shield volcanoes are also observed in this zone. The Þingvellir Graben is evidence of divergent plate movement in Iceland. It shows a clear extensional feature. It is located to the north of the plate triple junction manifest as the intersection of the WVZ, RVB, and SISZ near the Hengill volcano.

==== Mid-Iceland belt ====
The Mid-Iceland belt (MIB, Central Iceland volcanic zone, CIVZ, Mid-Iceland zone, Hofsjökull zone, Hofsjökull volcanic zone, HVZ) of volcanoes connects the WVZ to the intersection region of the NVZ and EVZ. It is parallel to the north of the SISZ and has a relationship to its transform nature. There is a small component of extension, that induces local volcanism but has no obvious strike-slip movement. The extension component has been proposed to be caused by the opposite sense of rotation of crustal blocks to the north, which is in the Eurasian Plate, and the Hreppar microplate to the south. It is thus the northern boundary of the Hreppar microplate as already mentioned. Both volcanic and seismic activity has been low in the Holocene.

=== Intra-plate deformation ===
This is manifest as volcanic belts separate to the rift associated zones above. In the case of the Öræfi volcanic belt, it is considered to be an embryonic rift, a process likely to be repeating past events with the southern part of the NVZ as an embryonic rift millions of years ago, given rift-zone jumping.

==== Snæfellsnes volcanic belt ====
Map of central volcanoes and their fissure fields (paler shading) in the Snæfellsnes volcanic belt: Legend: Snæfellsjökull; Helgrindur; Ljósufjöll

The Snæfellsnes volcanic belt (SVB, Snæfellsnes volcanic zone, SVZ) is an area of renewed intra-plate volcanism (North American Plate), less than 1.5 million years old. The SVB erupted through the western aspects of the extinct SHRZ, which is a predecessor to the present MIB. The SHRZ formed when the WVZ had the hotspot directly under it, and existed prior to the last historic rift-zone jump. The SHRZ had produced underlying crustal tholeiitic flood basalts that are over 5 million years old. It is unknown if the SHRZ or hotspot interactions are the reason for the SVB, and this continues to be an area of study. Proposed mechanisms of magma production invoke partial melting of hydrothermally altered, dominantly basaltic crust or fractional crystallization of primary basaltic magma, or both mechanisms. It is now known that the magma production/maturation timescale, at over 100,000 years, is an order of magnitude or more greater than that in other zones in Iceland, favouring fractional crystallization mechanisms as primary.

The SVB comprises the stratovolcanoes of Snæfellsjökull, Helgrindur (Lýsuskarð), and Ljósufjöll in a peninsular east-to-west lineament, and is mainly basaltic volcanism from sources such as monogenetic cinder cones and isolated sub-glacial tuyas such as Vatnafell rather than from the long fissures found in the rift zones. These volcanoes have recently erupted small volumes of transitional to alkaline magmas relative to the less-evolved magmas and larger volumes from the rift zones. The underlying crust is thicker at about 25 km (16 mi) than in the active rift zone areas. Magma storage, in the studied regions of the belt, occurs just above the Moho, at about 22–11 km (13.7–6.8 mi) in the lower-to-mid crust, which is not usually the situation in rift zones, where magma chambers occur in the mid to shallow crust at about 5 km (3.1 mi).

Approximate outline of the central volcanoes in the Öræfi volcanic belt in brown. Clicking on the image to enable mouse-over allows zoom in which shows caldera features in red shading and glacier features in white/blue shading.

The oldest volcanic rocks formed since the belt erupted transitional lavas through the basement tholeiitic magma series are at the mountain of Setberg to the north east of Grundarfjörður and near Elliðatindar, on each side of the present Helgrindur volcanic system. The most recent eruption in the belt occurred at Rauðhálsahraun in the Ljósufjöll volcanic system about 960.

==== Öræfi volcanic belt ====
The Öræfi volcanic belt (ÖVB, Öræfajökull-Snæfell volcanic belt, Öræfajökull volcanic system, zone or belt, ÖVZ, Eastern flank zone) is to the east and parallel to the EVZ and NVZ. Its three component central volcanoes of Öræfajökull, Esjufjöll, and Snæfell are in a southwest-to-northeast trending lineament and have rhyolite through to alkalic erupted basalts. There is some evidence from similarities in the compositional studies on Snæfell and the Upptyppingar subglacial volcano in the NVZ for the ÖVB being a flank zone.

== See also ==
- Geology of Iceland
- Volcanism of Iceland
- Geology of Reykjanes Peninsula
- List of volcanic eruptions in Iceland
