= Volcanism of Iceland =

Volcano eruption of Litli-Hrútur, July 2023

Iceland experiences frequent volcanic activity, due to its location both on the Mid-Atlantic Ridge, a divergent tectonic plate boundary, and being over a hotspot. Most of the volcanoes of Iceland can be grouped by their relationship to volcanic rift zones.

Nearly thirty volcanoes are known to have erupted in the Holocene epoch; these include Eldgjá, source of the largest lava eruption in human history. Some of the various eruptions of lava, gas and ash have been both destructive of property and deadly to life over the years, as well as disruptive to local, European, and international air travel. The deadliest volcanic eruption in Iceland's history is Laki, which occurred in 1783–1784.

== Volcanic systems and volcanic zones of Iceland ==
Active volcanic areas and systems in Iceland

Holocene volcanism in Iceland is mostly to be found in the Neovolcanic Zone, comprising the Reykjanes volcanic belt (RVB), the Western volcanic zone (WVZ), the Mid-Iceland belt (MIB), the Eastern volcanic zone (EVZ) and the Northern volcanic zone (NVZ). Two lateral volcanic zones play a minor role: Öræfi volcanic belt (ÖVB) (Note: Also known as Öræfajökull volcanic system, zone or belt, or Eastern flank zone.), and Snæfellsnes volcanic belt (SVB). Outside of the main island are the Reykjanes Ridge (RR), as part of the Mid-Atlantic Ridge to the south-west and the Kolbeinsey Ridge (KR) to the north. Two transform zones are connecting these volcano-tectonic zones: the South Iceland seismic zone (SISZ) in the south of Iceland and the Tjörnes transform zone (TFZ) in the north.

The island has around 30 active volcanic systems. Within each are volcano-tectonic fissure systems and many, but not all of them, also have at least one central volcano (mostly in the form of a stratovolcano, sometimes of a shield volcano with a magma chamber underneath). Several classifications of the systems exist, for example there is one of 30 systems, and one of 34 systems, with the latter currently being used in Iceland. There are 23 central volcanoes using the definition that they erupt frequently, extrude either basaltic, intermediate or felsic lavas, have an associated shallow crustal magma chamber, and are often associated with collapse caldera or fissure systems. Shield volcanoes, as the term is used in the Iceland context, tend to erupt only once, so have monogenetic characteristics. However, many shield volcanoes outside Iceland are associated with oceanic island volcanism such as in Hawaii, where they have been built up over many eruptions. Fissure vents in Iceland tend to produce calmer effusive eruptions, but can be associated with large volumes of lava (flood basalt events), and some have had prolonged eruptions with numerous eruptive episodes, lasting for years.

Up to 2008, thirteen of the volcanic systems had hosted eruptions since the settlement of Iceland in AD 874. Nearly thirty volcanoes are known to have erupted in the Holocene epoch and so are active. Of these active volcanic systems, the most active is Grímsvötn. Over the past 500 years, up until the start of 21st century, Iceland's volcanoes have produced a third of the total global lava output. Current productivity, which is known to be cyclical, has been estimated to be between 0.05–0.08 km^{3} (0.012–0.019 cu mi) per year which is higher than the output rate of the Hawaiian volcanoes, and would be double or even triple this figure if intrusive volumes are included.

=== Volcano tectonics ===
Map showing the Mid-Atlantic Ridge splitting Iceland and separating the North American and Eurasian Plates, with locations of some of Iceland's active volcanoes (🔺).

The types of eruptions most likely in a particular Icelandic volcanic system or zone are now understood. Earthquakes and volcanism have patterns in time and place that can be combined into a consistent tectonic process that is explained by the geological deformation of Iceland. There are four main types of tectonic zones in Iceland:

1. Spreading zones of rifting and volcanism producing the predominant Iceland tholeiitic basaltic crust.
2. Fracture zones connecting offset branches of the spreading zones which includes the South Iceland seismic zone (SISZ).
3. Trans-tensional zones with transform faulting and spreading of which are the Reykjanes volcanic belt (RVB) and Tjörnes transform zone (TFZ).
4. Flank zones with stratovolcanoes and minor rifting with alkalic to transitional volcanic rocks over the crust.

These tectonic zones result from the interaction of combination of the spreading activity of the Mid-Atlantic Ridge, which is spreading in a general east and west direction while the mantle plume activity that results in the hotspot, has been migrating over at least the last 25 million years in a west to slightly south-east direction.

=== Maps ===
Volcanic and transform zones of Iceland Legend: RR, Reykjanes Ridge; RVB, Reykjanes Volcanic Belt; WVZ, West Volcanic Zone; MIB, Mid-Iceland Belt; SISZ, South Iceland Seismic Zone; EVZ, East Volcanic Zone; SIVZ, South Iceland Volcanic Zone; NVZ, North Volcanic Zone; TFZ, Tjörnes Fracture Zone; KR, Kolbeinsey Ridge; ÖVB, Öræfajökul Volcanic Belt; VB, Snæfellsnes Volcanic Belt

Outlines of central volcanoes in Iceland Legend: Other shading shows: calderas; central volcanoes; fissure swarms; subglacial terrain above 1,100 m (3,600 ft); seismically active areas; Clicking on the rectangle in the image enlarges to full window and enables mouse-over with more detail.

Volcanoes and volcanic systems in Iceland with Wikipedia articles
Key:
- 1) Snæfellsjökull
- 2) Ljósufjöll
- 3) Reykjanes
- 4) Svartsengi
- 5) Fagradalsfjall
- 6) Krýsuvík
- 7) Brennisteinsfjöll
- 8) Hengill
- 9) Surtsey
- 10) Eldfell
- 11) Eyjafjallajökull
- 12) Hekla
- 13) Katla
- 14) Lakagigar
- 15) Öræfajökull
- 16) Grímsvötn
- 17) Bárðarbunga
- 18) Hofsjökull
- 19) Langjökull
- 20) Askja
- 21) Krafla
- 22) Þeistareykjabunga

== Geology ==
=== Morphology ===
Fissure vents are found predominantly in what are termed fissure swarms (a combination of tectonic related fissures and faults) that are also associated with crater rows and smaller cinder or spatter cones. Where such eruptions interact with water, the eruptions become more explosive and these phreatomagmatic eruptions produce tephra and possibly maars and tuff rings or cones.

=== Composition ===
The composition of the lava reflects the tectonic factors above and are consistent with the influence of the hotspot. Hence, the trend is for ocean island basalts (OIB) type to predominate over mid ocean ridge basalts (MORB) which are only found in the north of the Northern volcanic zone (NVZ). The compositional series are thus tholeiitic basalt, transitional alkalic basalts and alkalic (felsic).

Large extrusive, predominantly tholeiitic basaltic lava fields and shields with theoleiitic lava are the predominant material erupted and are found in the RVB, WVZ, MIB, EVZ and NVZ. They are associated with divergence tectonics of the ridge plate boundaries. Central volcanoes, with associated fissure swarms are typical, except in the RVB. Hengill is the only active central volcano in the far east of the RVB, and this is likely to be because a triple junction exists here, resulting in a volcano with some rhyolytic and dacite components due to the complexity of its rift propagation formation. The island of Eldey off the south-west of the RVB has similar geological formations to the RVB but has a basalt composition with tholeiites and picrites. Hofsjökull, a large volcano with a caldera and rhyolite lavas in the MIB has explosive eruption potential but has not erupted underneath its ice cover for several thousand years and its companion Kerlingarfjöll for even longer.

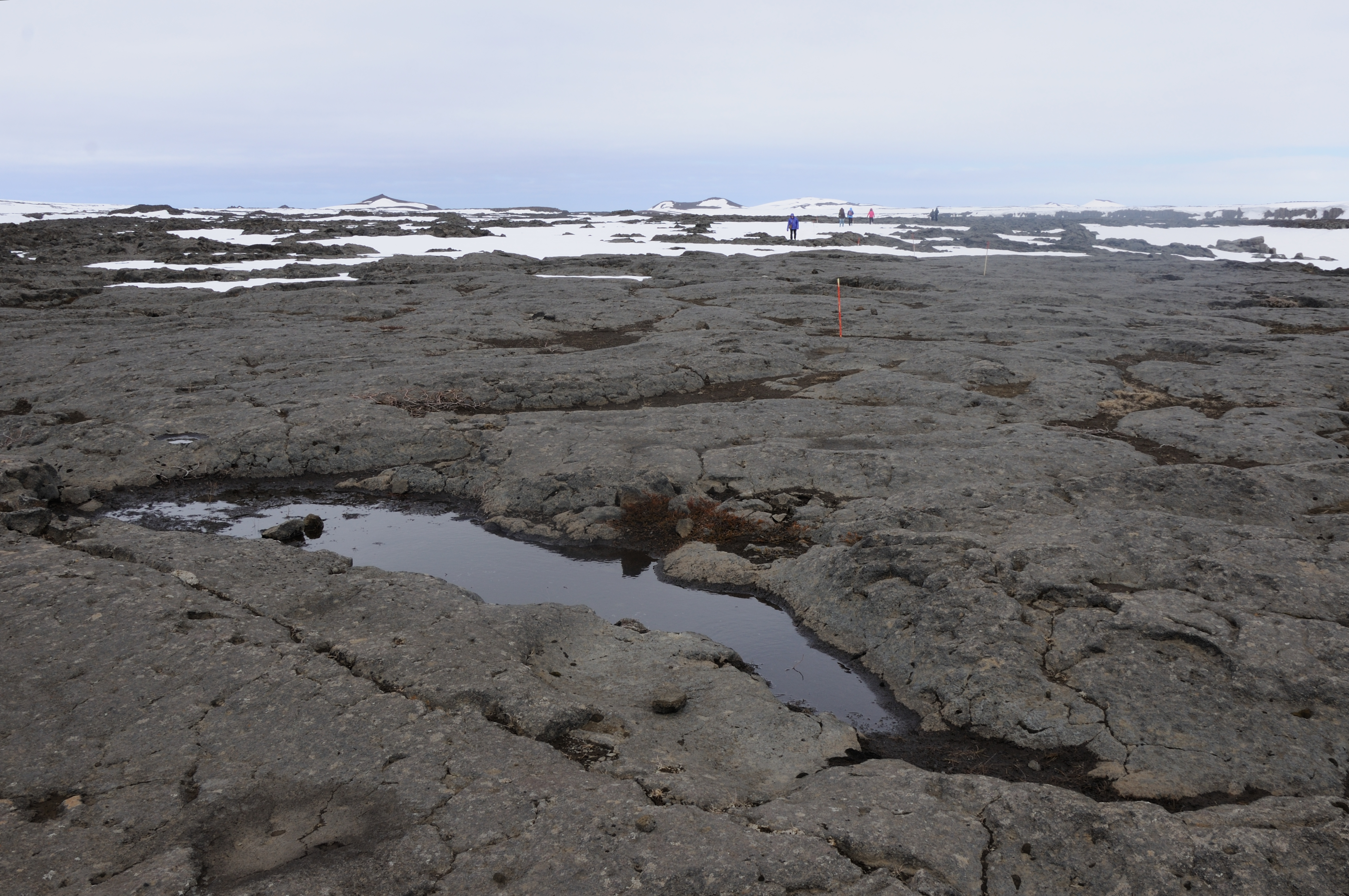
Pāhoehoe (helluhraun) lava fields in Iceland

Arc volcanism has been thought to be occurring in the Snæfellsnes volcanic belt (SVB) with alkaline magma series volcanism in the stratovolcanoes such as Snæfellsjökull, which usually erupt effusive basaltic lava but can have infrequent explosive silicic eruptions followed by extrusion of intermediate composition lava. However the modelling of the processes involved is incomplete and almost certainly involves primarily fractional crystallization of primary basaltic magma with limited input from pre-existing crustal material as is the case in arc volcanism. The Öræfi volcanic belt (ÖVB) is represented by the Öræfajökull (Hnappafellsjökull) stratovolcano which has a history of violent rhyolite to alkali basalt eruptions with tephra volumes up to 10 km^{3} (2.4 cu mi) and accompanying jökulhlaup.

The island Vestmannaeyjar volcano to the southwest of Iceland has in its recent activity formed the island of Surtsey and cones such as Eldfell on Heimaey. It is the southern tip of the Eastern volcanic zone (EVZ) propagating rift in what is an off rift region called the South Iceland volcanic zone (SIVZ), and the older alkaline basalts were alkali olivine and more recent mugearite in composition. The basalts of the southern EVZ on land are rarely silicic but the volcanoes can have explosive phreatomagmatic eruptions. Overall, the surface area of post glacial erupted rocks of Iceland is 92% basalt, 4% basaltic andesites, 3% dacite-rhyolites and 1% andesites.

The smooth flowing basaltic lava pāhoehoe is known in Icelandic as helluhraun [ˈhɛtlʏˌr̥œyːn]. It forms smooth lava fields that are quite easy to cross. More viscous lava forms ʻaʻā flows, known in Icelandic as apalhraun [ˈaːpalˌr̥œyːn]. The loose, broken, sharp and spiny surface of an ʻaʻā flow makes hiking across it difficult, slow and dangerous.

== Significant eruptions ==
See also : List of volcanic eruptions in Iceland

=== Largest Holocene eruptions ===
Due to incomplete surveys, which also need to be confined to subaerial eruptions and not include igneous intrusions, the accumulative amounts of dense-rock equivalent (DRE) erupted in Iceland will be underestimated. The amounts known are some of the most significant contributions to recent eruptive volumes on Earth. Since the last ice age, 91% of the magma erupted in Iceland has been mafic, 6% intermediate in composition and 3% silicic. The number of eruptions estimated in this 11,700 odd year period can only be an approxiamate figure, (Note: Number of eruptions is a ballpark figure. See note on inadequacy DRE tephra Icelandic record for some of the reasons. Even today, eruptions under a glacier might be suspected but not proved.) but about three to four explosive ones occur for every purely effusive one.

Accumulative Holocene eruptions by zone or belt
Volcanic Zone or Belt	Lava DRE (Note: DRE for lava flows is known to be 50% inaccurate if based on the planimetric method rather than preeruption and posteruption digital elevation models.)	Tephra DRE (Note: Inaccuracies in tephra DRE estimates are worse than for lava as: less than 35% of Holocene explosive eruptions have been associated with their tephra layer, Iceland's post-glacial tephra stratigraphy is incomplete and distribution of less than 10% of the known tephra layers have been mapped.)	Total DRE	Number of eruptions	Notes
Eastern volcanic zone (EVZ)	175.2 km^{3} (42.0 cu mi)	164.3 km^{3} (39.4 cu mi)	339.4 km^{3} (81.4 cu mi)	2026	Includes individual eruptions from Laki 15.1 km^{3} (3.6 cu mi), Eldgjá 19.6 km^{3} (4.7 cu mi) and Þjórsá Lava 25.0 km^{3} (6.0 cu mi).
Western volcanic zone (WVZ)	94.0 km^{3} (22.6 cu mi)	0.0 km^{3} (0.0 cu mi)	94.0 km^{3} (22.6 cu mi)	47	
Northern volcanic zone (NVZ)	90.7 km^{3} (21.8 cu mi)	3.3 km^{3} (0.8 cu mi)	94.0 km^{3} (22.6 cu mi)	146	
Reykjanes volcanic belt (RVB)	22.3 km^{3} (5.3 cu mi)	22.0 km^{3} (5.3 cu mi)	29.2 km^{3} (7.0 cu mi)	151	Ongoing as of 2025.
Snæfellsnes volcanic belt (SVB)	7.7 km^{3} (1.8 cu mi)	1.3 km^{3} (0.3 cu mi)	9.0 km^{3} (2.2 cu mi)	57	
Öræfi volcanic belt (ÖVB)	0.6 km^{3} (0.1 cu mi)	2.4 km^{3} (0.6 cu mi)	3.0 km^{3} (0.7 cu mi)	8	
Mid-Iceland belt (MIB)	1.0 km^{3} (0.2 cu mi)	0.0 km^{3} (0.0 cu mi)	1.0 km^{3} (0.2 cu mi)	9	

=== Laki (1783–1784) ===
The most deadly volcanic eruption of Iceland's history was Laki, also called Skaftáreldar ("fires of Skaftá") in 1783–1784. The eruption was in the crater row Lakagígar ("craters of Laki") southwest of Vatnajökull glacier. The craters are a part of a larger volcanic system with the subglacial Grímsvötn as a central volcano. Roughly a fifth of the Icelandic population died because of the eruption. Most died not because of the lava flow or other direct effects of the eruption but from indirect effects, including changes in climate and illnesses in livestock in the following years caused by the ash and poisonous gases from the eruption. The eruption resulted in the second largest basaltic lava flow from a single eruption in historic times.

=== Eldfell (1973) ===
Houses buried by tephra from Eldfell eruption, August 1974

Eldfell is a volcanic cone on the east side of the island of Heimaey which formed during an eruption in January 1973. The eruption happened without warning, causing the island's population of about 5,300 people to evacuate on fishing boats within a few hours. Importantly, the progress of lava into the harbour was slowed by manual spraying of seawater. One person died, and the eruption resulted in the destruction of homes and property on the island.

=== Eyjafjallajökull (2010) ===
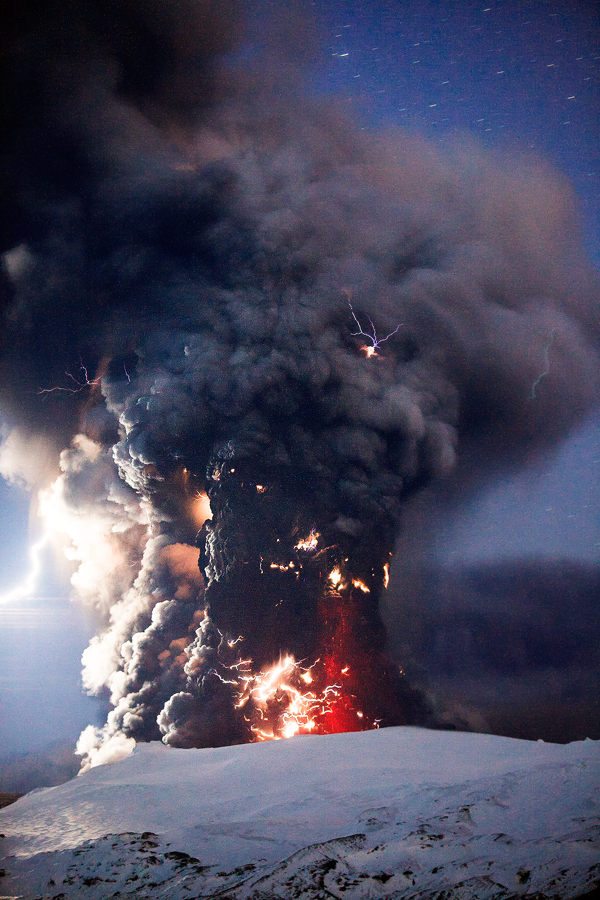
Eyjafjallajökull eruption, April 2010

The eruption under Eyjafjallajökull in April 2010 had a VEI of 4, the largest known from Eyjafjallajökull. Several previous eruptions of Eyjafjallajökull have been followed soon afterwards by eruptions of the larger volcano Katla, but after the 2010 eruption, no activity occurred at Katla.

The eruption caused extreme disruption to air travel across western and northern Europe over a period of six days in April 2010. About 20 countries closed their airspace to commercial jet traffic and it affected approximately 10 million travellers.

=== Holuhraun (2014–2015) ===
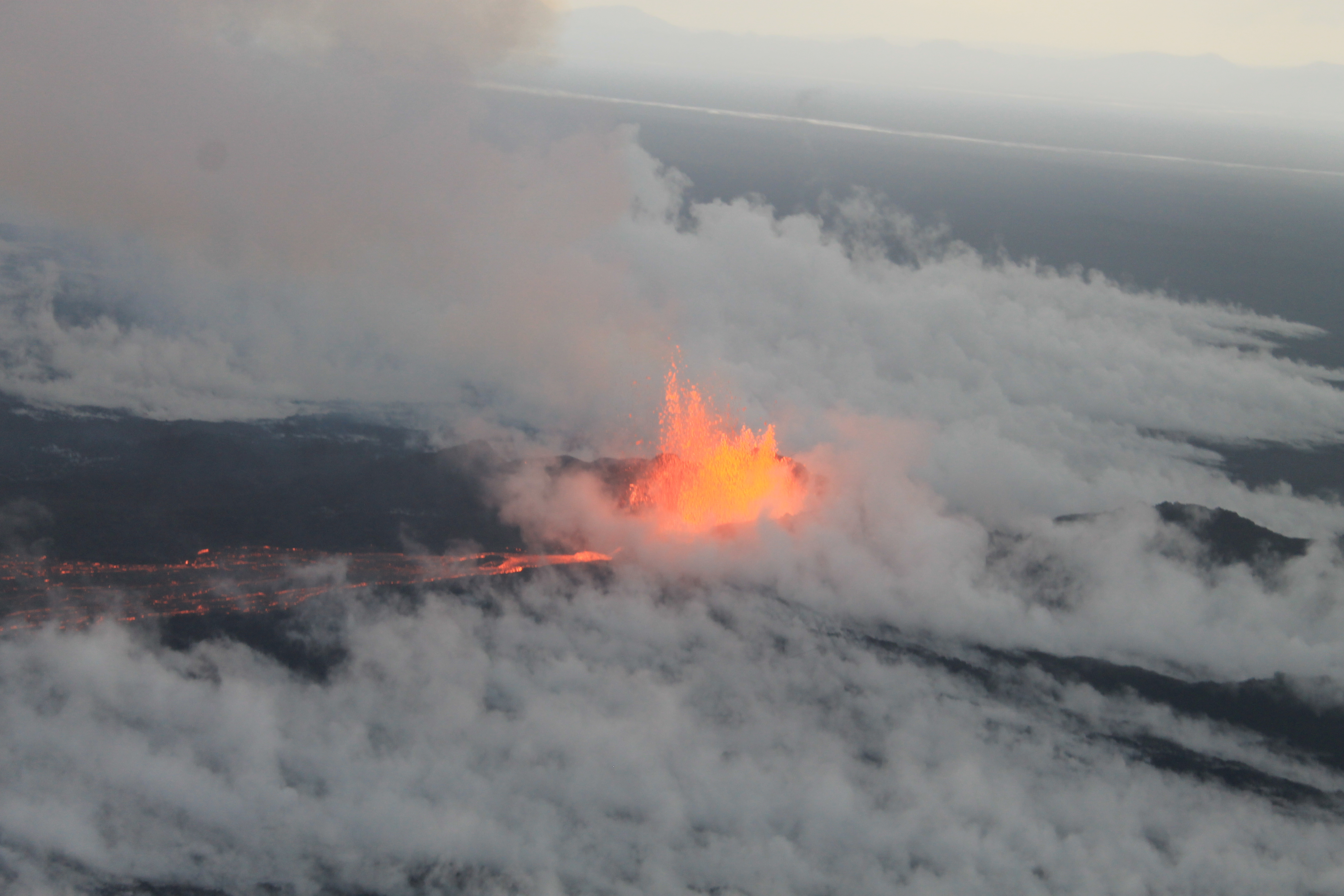
Degassing Holuhraun lava field with fountaining at crater Baugur, September 2014

Bárðarbunga is a stratovolcano roughly 2,000 metres (6,600 ft) above sea level in central Iceland, i.e. in the northern edge of Vatnajökull. This makes it the second highest mountain in Iceland.

Holuhraun is an older lava field situated 50 km (31 mi) north-east of Bárðarbunga, 20 km (12 mi) south of Askja (last eruption 1961), at an altitude of about 700 m (2,300 ft). The eruption started on August 17, 2014, and lasted for 180 days. The 2014–2015 eruption was Iceland's largest in 230 years. Following a major earthquake swarm, multiple lava fountain eruptions began in Holuhraun. The lava flow rate was between 250 and 350 m^{3}/s (8,800 and 12,400 cu ft/s) and came from a dyke over 40 km (25 mi) long. An ice-filled subsidence bowl over 100 km^{2} (39 sq mi) in area and up to 65 m (213 ft) deep formed as well. There was very limited ash output from this eruption. The primary concern with this eruption was the large plumes of sulphur dioxide (SO_{2}) in the atmosphere which adversely affected breathing conditions across Iceland, depending on wind direction. The volcanic cloud was also transported toward Western Europe in September 2014.

=== Fagradalsfjall (2021–2022) ===
Following a three-week period of increased seismic activity, an eruption fissure developed near Fagradalsfjall, a mountain on the Reykjanes Peninsula. Lava flow from a 200-meter fissure was first discovered by an Icelandic Coast Guard helicopter on March 19, 2021, in the Geldingadalur area near Grindavík, and within hours the fissure had grown to 500 m (1,600 ft) in length. Another eruption, very similar to the 2021 eruption, began on 3 August 2022, and ceased on 21 August 2022.

=== Other ===
Hekla has erupted more than 20 times in recorded history. It was known to medieval Europeans as the Gate of Hell; that reputation persisted into the 19th century.

The eruption in May 2011 at Grímsvötn under the Vatnajökull glacier sent thousands of tonnes of ash into the sky in a few days, raising concerns of the potential for air travel chaos across northern Europe, although only about 900 flights were initially disrupted.

On 10 July 2023 at 16:40 UTC, a fissure eruption began adjacent to the summit of Litli-Hrútur, and ended on 5 August 2023. On December 18, 2023, Sundhnúkur began a fissure eruption near Hagafell. In January 2024, lava from this eruption destroyed 3 houses in the nearby town of Grindavík.

== Gallery ==
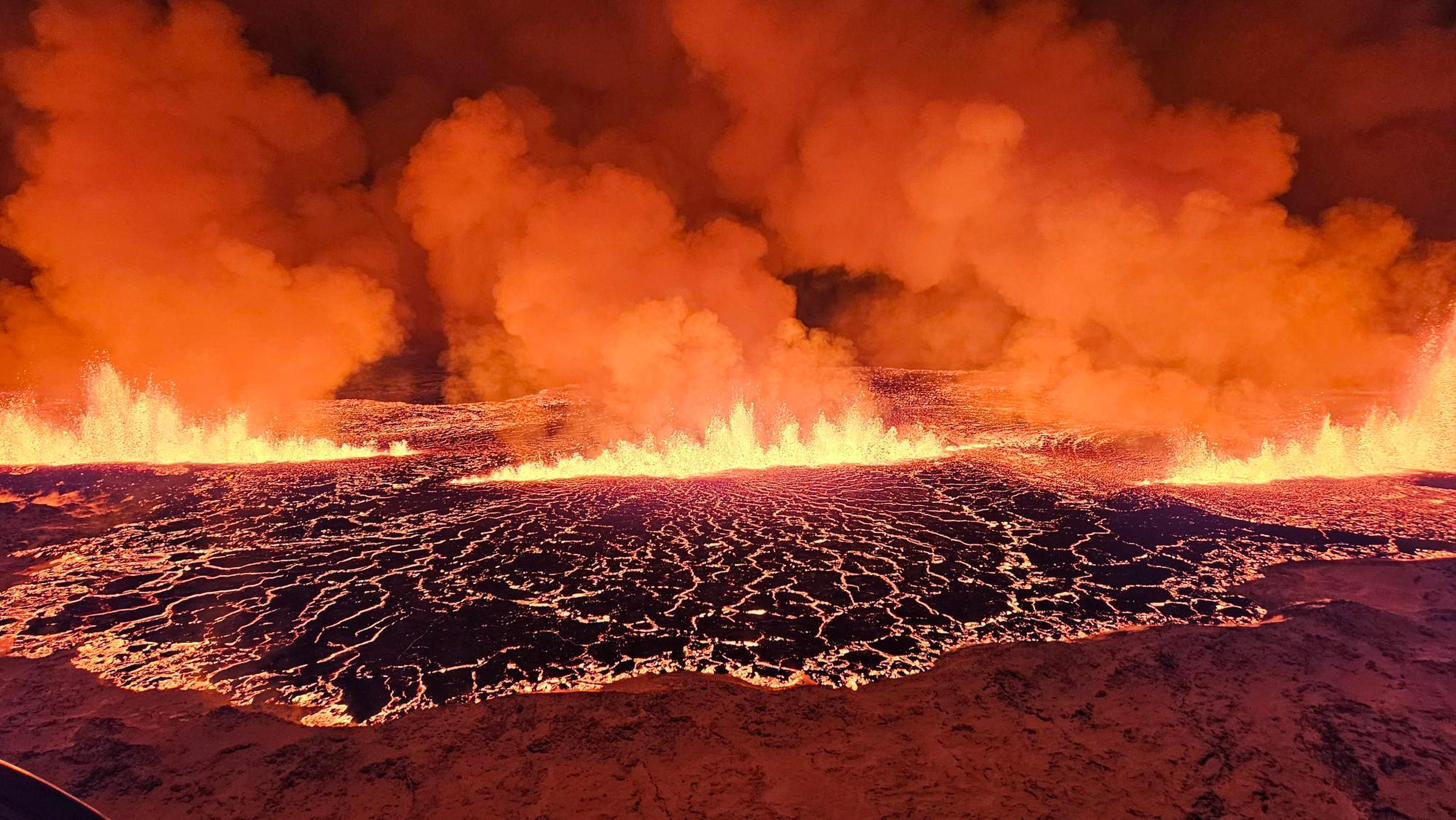
Lava flows and fire fountains at Sundhnúkur, December 18th, 2023

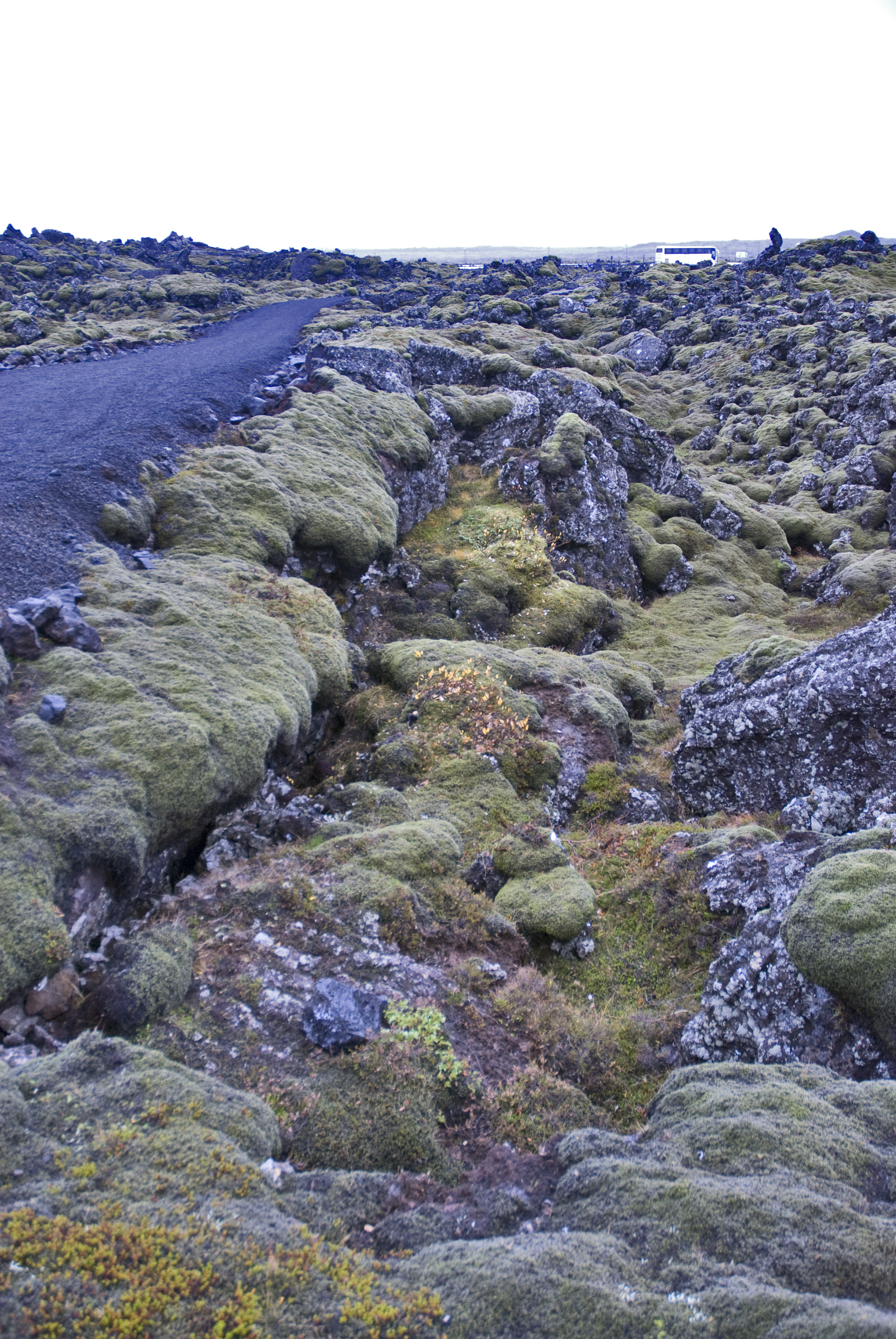
ʻAʻā (apalhraun) field near Blue Lagoon

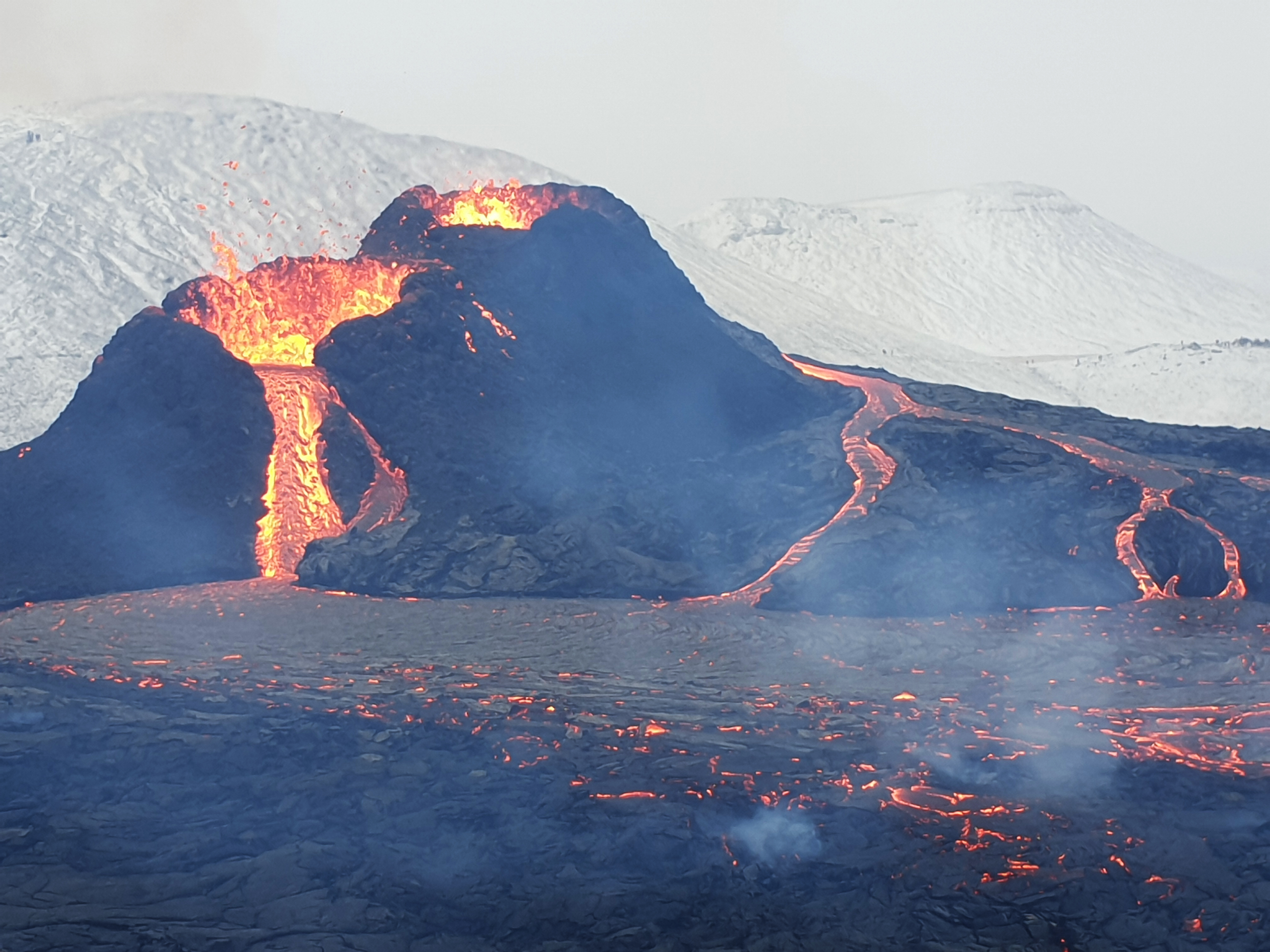
Cinder cone produced by the Fagradalsfjall eruption, March 24th, 2021

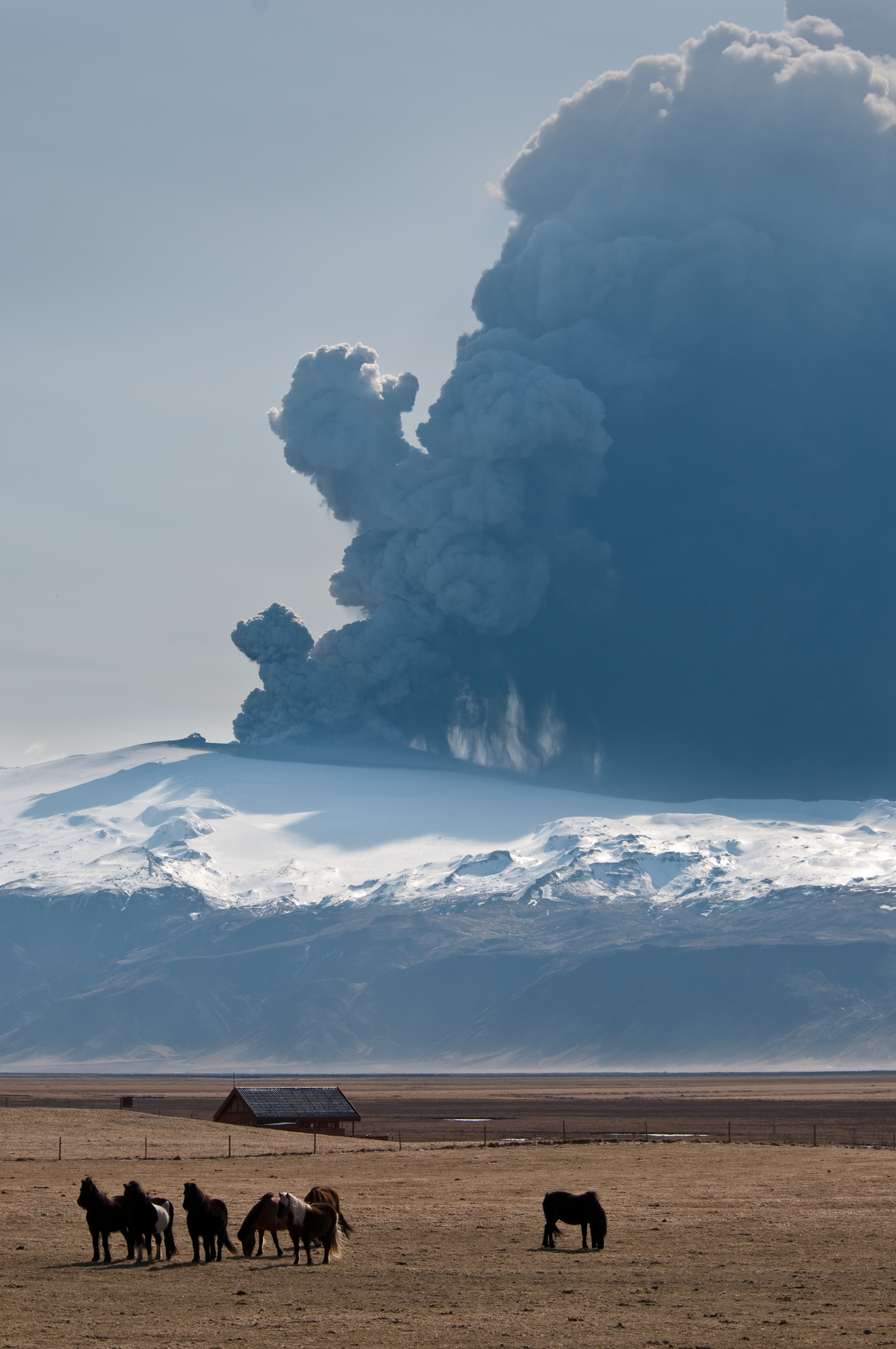
Eyjafjallajökull eruption column, April 17th, 2010

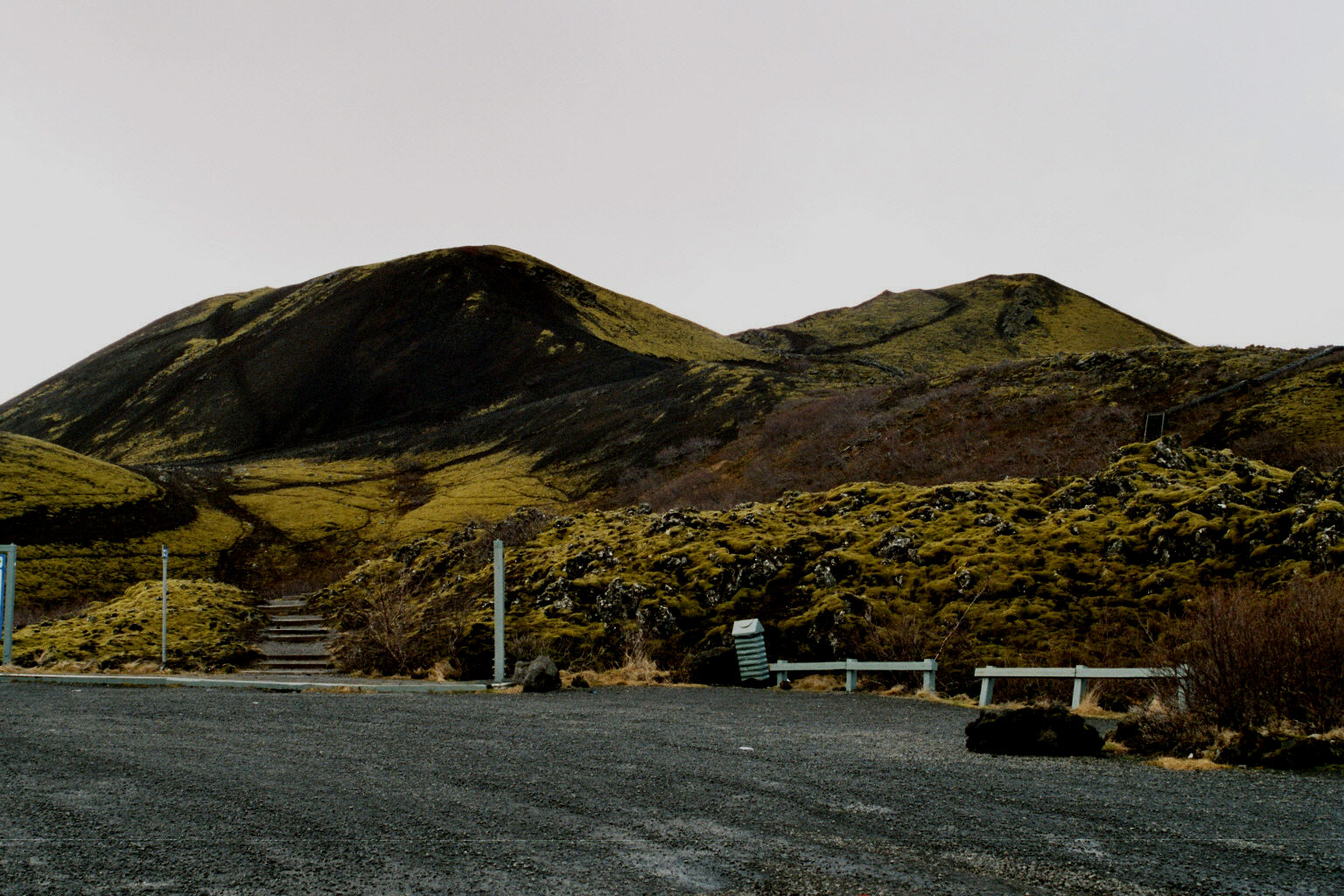
The craters of Grábrók

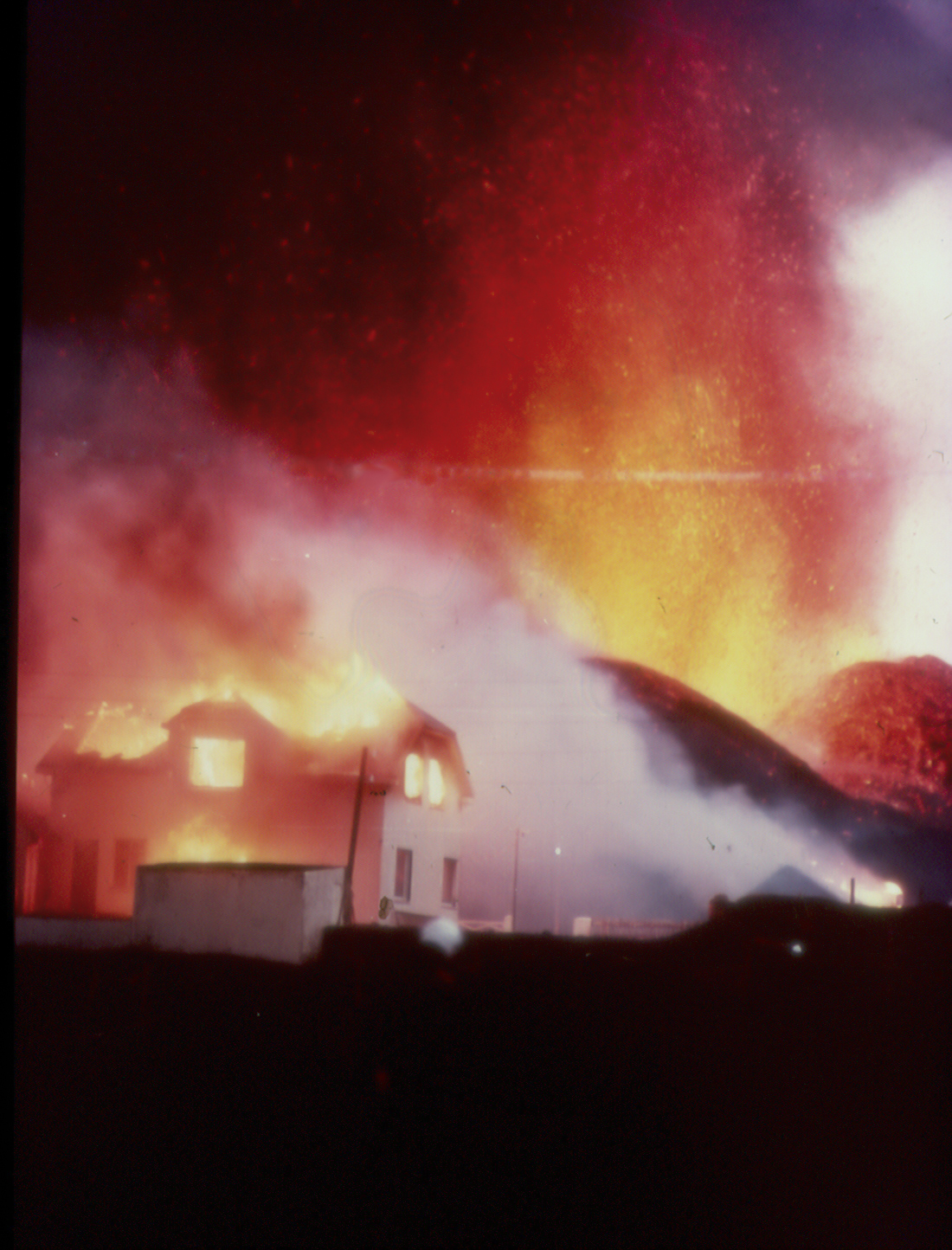
House on fire by lava being sprayed into the air from fissures, Eldfell eruption, January 1973

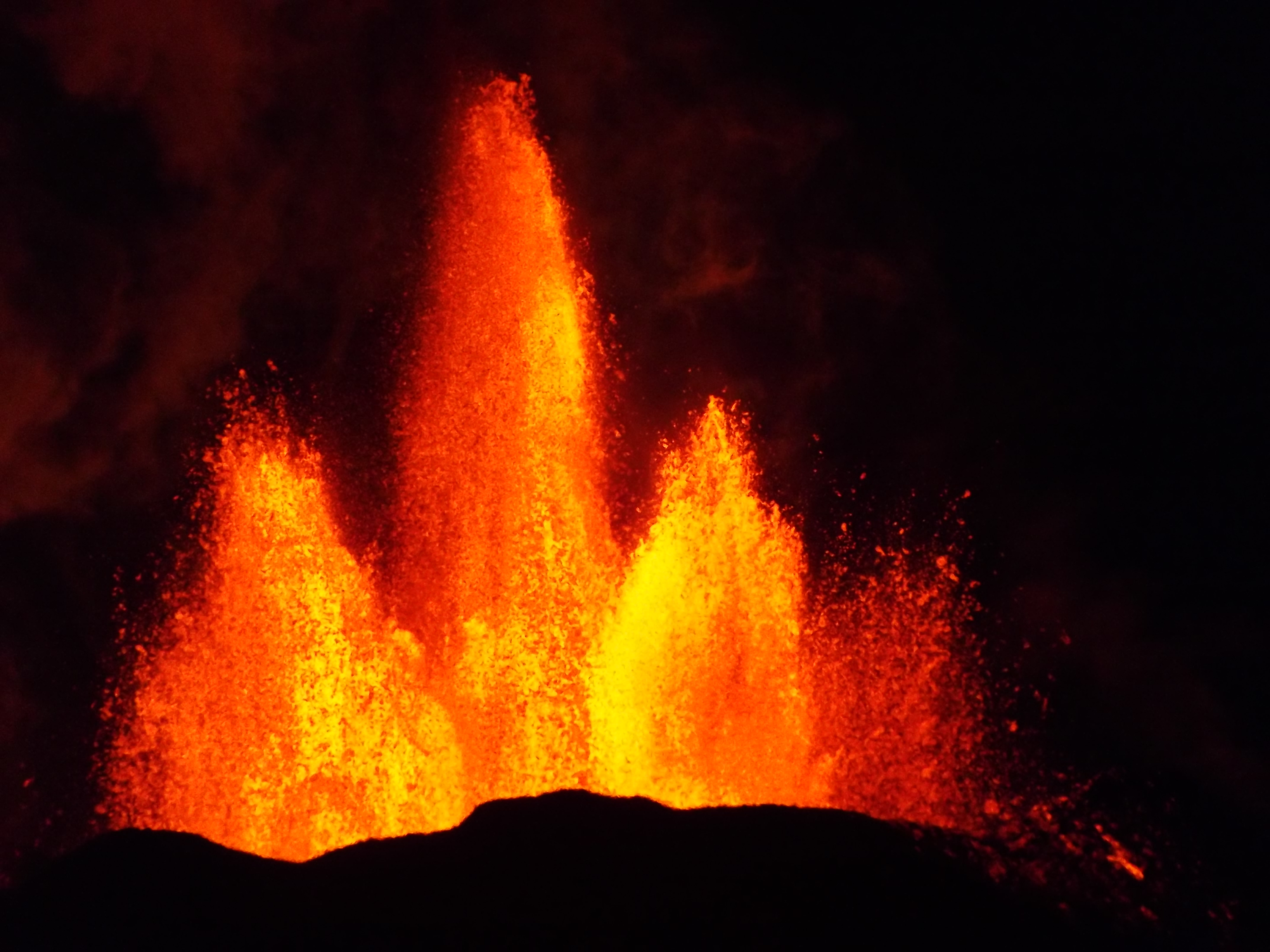
Lava fountains of the fissure eruption in Holuhraun, September 13th, 2014

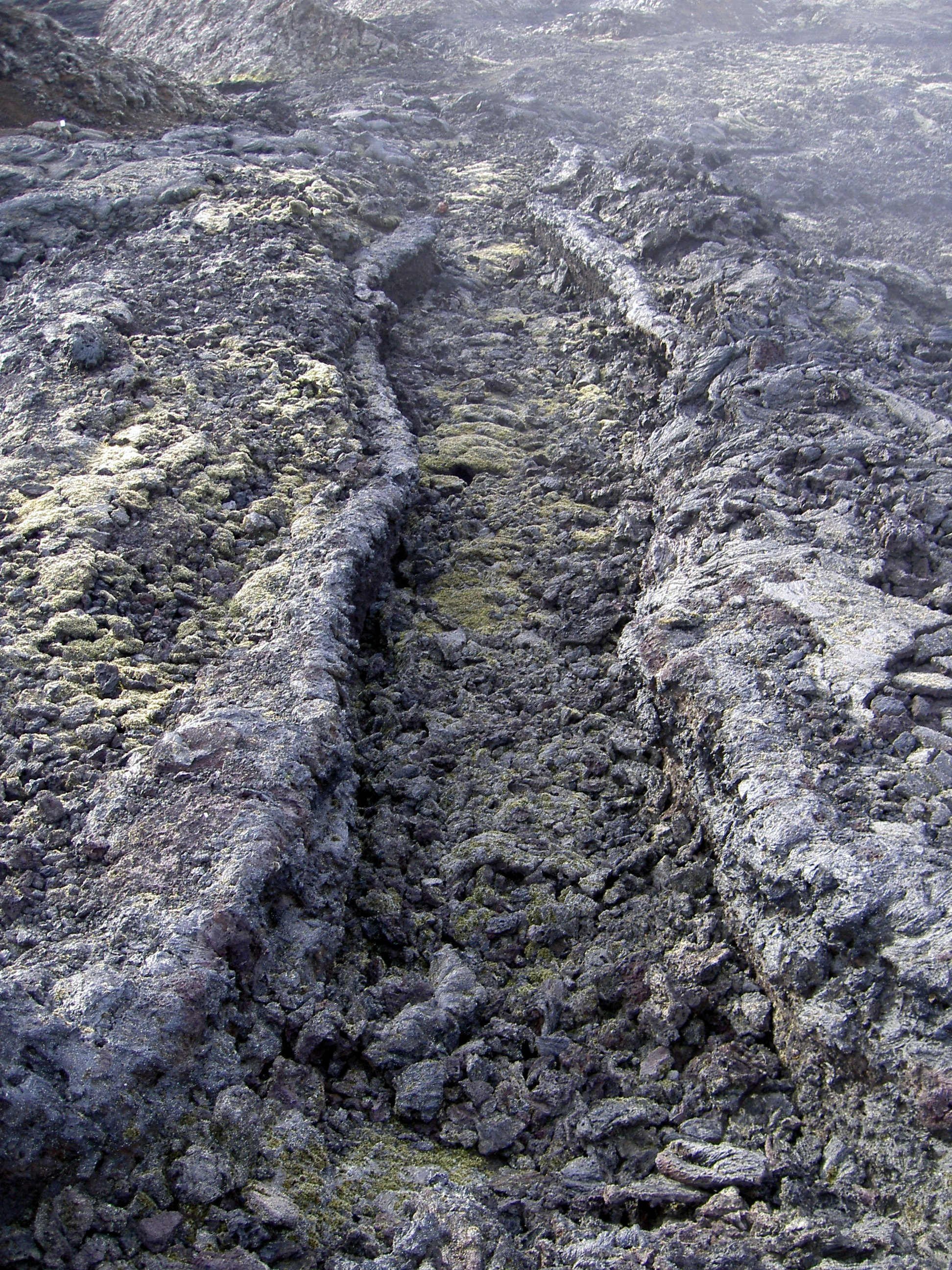
Lava flow channel left behind after the Krafla fires fires of 1975-1984

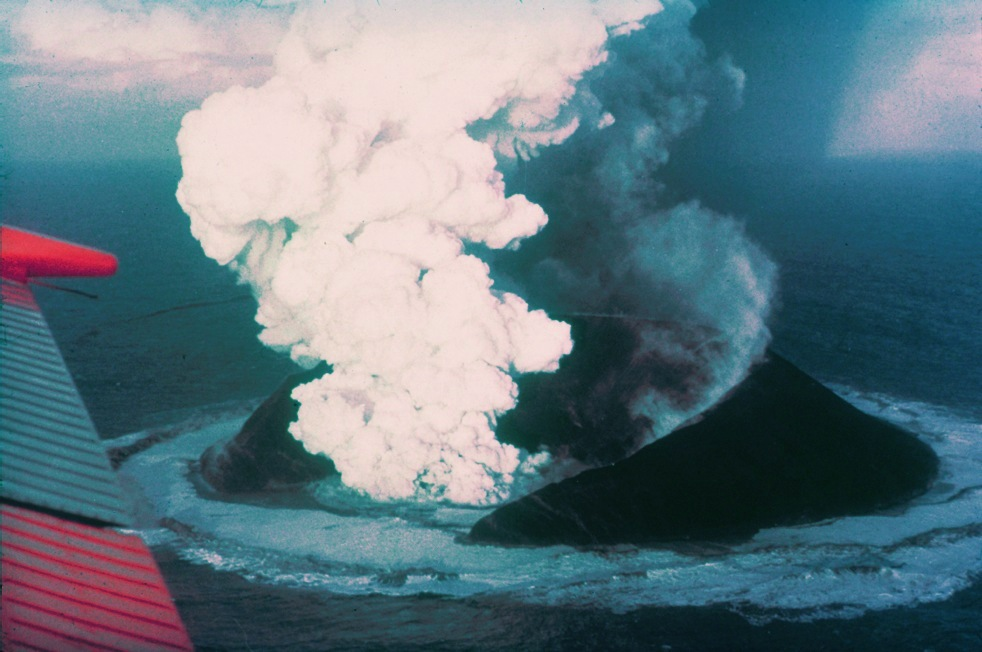
Surtsey eruption, November 30th, 1963

Lava flow from Litli-Hrútur eruption, July 17th, 2023

== See also ==
- Geography of Iceland
- Geology of Iceland
- Geological deformation of Iceland
- List of volcanoes in Iceland
- List of volcanic eruptions in Iceland
- Geothermal power in Iceland
- Geology of Reykjanes Peninsula
- Surtsey
