= List of volcanic eruptions in Iceland =

High-level geological features of Iceland, with some volcanic zones and notable active volcanoes.

Iceland's location on the Mid-Atlantic Ridge, above the Iceland hotspot, means that the island and its surroundings are a site of highly frequent volcanic eruptions.

== Index map of eruptions, fissures, glaciers and notable sites ==
List of volcanic eruptions in Iceland (Iceland)

== Volcanic zones and systems ==
Volcanic zones and belts in Iceland with a dotted circle that indicates the approximate location of the Iceland hotspot.

Iceland has several major volcanic zones surrounding the Iceland hotspot:

=== East volcanic zone (EVZ) ===
The East Volcanic Zone (EVZ), the central volcanoes Vonarskarð and Hágöngur, belong to the same volcanic system. The southern propagating rift region of the EVZ with more tendency to explosive eruption characteristics is known as the Southern Iceland Volcanic Zone (SIVZ).

Features within the East Volcanic Zone include:

- Bárðarbunga
- Bláhnjúkur
- Brennisteinsalda
- Eldgjá
- Eyjafjallajökull
- Gjálp
- Grímsvötn
- Central volcano Hágöngur
- Hekla
- Katla
- Lakagigar (Laki)
- Þjórsá Lava
- Þórólfsfell
- Surtsey
- Thordarhyrna (Þórðarhyrna)
- Tindfjallajökull
- Torfajökull
- Vatnafjöll
- Several volcanoes in Vatnajökull
- Vatnaöldur
- Vestmannaeyjar (Westman Islands)
- Central volcano Vonarskarð

=== Kolbeinsey Ridge (KR) ===
The Kolbeinsey Ridge is a segment of the Mid-Atlantic Ridge located to the north of Iceland in the Arctic Ocean. It is bounded to the south by the Tjörnes Fracture Zone, which connects the submarine ridge to the on-shore Northern Volcanic Zone rifting center in eastern Iceland. The volcanic islands Kolbeinsey and Grímsey lie along the Kolbeinsey Ridge.

=== Mid-Iceland Belt (MIB) ===
The Mid-Iceland belt (MIB) connects the East, West and North volcanic zones, across central Iceland.

=== North volcanic zone (NVZ) ===
North of Iceland, the Mid-Atlantic Ridge is called Kolbeinsey Ridge (KR) and is connected to the North Volcanic Zone via the Tjörnes Fracture Zone (TFZ).

Volcanoes within the North Volcanic Zone include:

- Askja
- Dimmuborgir
- Fremrinámur
- Herðubreið
- Hverfjall
- Kollóttadyngja
- Krafla
- Kverkfjöll
- Many volcanoes in the Mývatn district
- Rauðhólar
- Theistareykjarbunga
- Trölladyngja

=== Öræfajökull volcanic belt (ÖVB) ===
The Öræfajökull volcanic belt (ÖVB, also Öræfi volcanic belt) is an intraplate volcanic belt, connected to the Eurasian plate.

=== Reykjanes volcanic zone (RVZ) ===
The Reykjanes volcanic zone (RVZ or Reykjanes volcanic belt, RVB) contains multiple fissure vent orientated volcanic systems including one with a similar name. It is the continuation of the Reykjanes Ridge (RR) (the Mid-Atlantic Ridge south of Iceland and intersects to its north-east at Hengill with the WVZ and the South Iceland seismic zone (SISZ, also known as the Reykjanes fracture zone, RFZ).

Features in this zone include:

- Bláfjöll
- Brennisteinsfjöll
- Búrfell (Hafnarfjörður)
- Eldborg í Bláfjöllum
- Eldvörp–Svartsengi
- Fagradalsfjall
- Heiðin há
- Helgafell (Hafnarfjörður)
- Hengill (also listed under WVZ)
- Keilir
- Krýsuvík (volcanic system)
- Krýsuvík fires
- Leitin
- Rauðhólar (Reykjavík)
- Reykjanes volcanic system
- Stóra-Eldborg undir Geitahlíð
- Svartsengi Power Station
- Sveifluháls
- Vífilsfell
- Þorbjörn (mountain)

=== Snæfellsnes volcanic belt (SVB) ===
The Snæfellsnes volcanic belt (SVB) is an intraplate volcanic belt, connected to the North American plate.

It is proposed that the east–west line from the Grímsvötn volcano in the Mid-Iceland Belt (MIB) to the SVB shows the movement of the North American Plate over the Iceland hotspot.

Features of the Snæfellsnes volcanic belt include Snæfellsjökull and smaller volcanoes on Snæfellsnes, plus Helgafell.

=== South Iceland Seismic Zone (SISZ) ===
The South Iceland Seismic Zone (SISZ) is a fracture zone, which connects the East and West Volcanic Zones. It contains its own volcanic systems, smaller than those in the Mid-Iceland Belt. The SISZ is a set of major and active transform faults striking west-northwest in southwestern Iceland, being one of two large fracture zones, associated with such transform faults, striking about 75°N to 80°W, the other being the Tjörnes Fracture Zone.

Features within the South Iceland Seismic Zone include the towns of Selfoss, Vík, Hvolsvöllur and probably Þingvellir the old meeting place of the Alþing.

=== Tjörnes Fracture Zone (TFZ) ===
The Tjörnes Fracture Zone (TFZ) connects the North Volcanic Zone to the Kolbeinsey Ridge (KR), which is part of the Mid-Atlantic Ridge. It contains its own volcanic systems, which are smaller than those in the Mid-Iceland Belt.

It is one of two major and active transform faults zones striking west-northwest in northern and southern Iceland. The Tjörnes and Reykjanes Fracture Zones are found striking about 75°N to 80°W.

=== West volcanic zone (WVZ) ===
Features within the West Volcanic Zone include:

- Geitlandsjökull
- Geysir
- Hengill (also listed under RFZ)
- Hlöðufell
- Hveravellir
- Skjaldbreiður
- Stóra-Björnsfell
- Þórisjökull

== Chronological list of eruptions ==
=== Prehistoric eruptions ===
Dates are approximate. Please see individual articles that may have more date detail.

Date	Volcano	Zone	VEI	Notes
16,000,000 years ago				The oldest known rock in Iceland was formed in a lava eruption. The age of the basaltic strata from west to east is 16–10 million years. (See Geology of Iceland – Origins)
Circa 3,200,000 years ago (Plio-Pleistocene)	Esjan (Esja)	RVZ		The western part is about 3.2 million years and the eastern part is about 1.8 million years. The movements of the plate boundaries are continually moving the strata to the west and away from the active volcanic zone. Two volcanoes were active in the Reykjavík region, Viðey volcano and Stardals volcano. They partially formed Esja (Esjan); the smaller mountains near Reykjavík; plus the islands and small peninsulas like Viðey and Kjalarnes.
2,600,000-9,000 years ago	Viðey	RVZ		About two million years ago during the Pleistocene, Viðey was an active volcano with a massive caldera. The remains of this caldera are much larger than the modern island itself, with the island near the caldera's center. The rest of the caldera underlies a large part of what is now Kollafjörður. The underwater eruption that formed Viðey island stopped circa 9,000 years ago.
2,500,000-11,000 years ago.	Grensdalur	SISZ		Currently dormant, inactive since the Pleistocene era.
2,500,000-11,000 years ago	Formation of Keilir	RVZ		Keilir was formed during a subglacial fissure eruption which thawed the ice and formed a subglacial lake, and caused explosive activity. Ice thickness and more exact time of eruption are not known, just that it took place during the Pleistocene (Weichselian).
2,500,000-11,000 years ago	Hofsjökull			Subglacial volcano is a shield type with caldera. The third largest ice cap after Vatnajökull and Langjökull and the largest active volcano in the country, situated in the west of the Highlands
Circa 1,800,000 years ago (Pliocene-Pleistocene)	Esjan (Esja)	RVZ		The western part is about 3.2 million years and the eastern part is about 1.8 million years. The movements of the plate boundaries are continually moving the strata to the west and away from the active volcanic zone. Two volcanoes were active in the Reykjavík region, Viðey volcano and Stardals volcano. They partially formed Esja (Esjan); the smaller mountains near Reykjavík; plus the islands and small peninsulas like Viðey and Kjalarnes.
Circa 700,000 years ago	Snæfellsjökull	SVB		Stratovolcano on the Snæfellsnes Peninsula. Has pyroclastic cones on its flanks, plus upper-flank craters and lower-flank basaltic lava flows. Holocene eruptions have produced felsic material.
400,000-500,000 years ago	Ingólfsfjall	SISZ		The main volcanic bulk is about 400-500 000 years old.
100,000 years ago	Keilir,	RVZ		Volcanic cone on the Reykjanes peninsula, in the Krýsuvík (volcanic system).
54,000 years ago	Tindfjallajökull,	EVZ		Stratovolcano, a 5 km (3.1 mi)-wide caldera was formed during Thórsmörk ignimbrite.
42,000-12,400 years ago	Sveifluháls			Volcanic melting of glacier ice induced the formation of one or more subglacial meltwater lakes. Dropping overburden pressures led to the eruption of vitric phreatomagmatic tuff.
11,000 years ago	Askja-S	NVZ		Tephra found in Norway, Sweden, Northern Ireland, and Romania.
Circa 10,600 years ago	Katla			It is thought that Katla is the source of more than 6 to 7 cubic kilometers (1.4 to 1.7 cu mi) of tephra 'Vedde Ash' found at a number of sites including Vedde in Norway, Denmark, Scotland and North Atlantic cores.
Circa 9,500 BC	Theistareykjarbunga (Þeistareykjarbunga)	NVZ		The first of three dated eruptions, produced approximately 18 billion cubic metres of basaltic lava.
circa 9,000 years ago	Skjaldbreiður			Lava shield formed in one huge and protracted eruption. The lava flowed south and formed the basin of Þingvallavatn, Iceland's largest lake.
8230 BC	Grímsvötn	EVZ	6	Produced some 15 km^{3} (3.6 cu mi) comprising the Saksunarvatn tephra.
Circa 6,800 BC	Theistareykjarbunga (Þeistareykjarbunga)	NVZ		The second of three dated eruptions.
6700 BC	The "Great Þjórsá Lava flow"			Largest known effusive eruption in Iceland in the last 10,000 years, originated from the Veiðivötn (area. The Þjórsá lava field is up to 1,000 km^{2} (390 sq mi) in area and flowed over 100 km (62 mi) to the sea and forms the coast between Þjórsá and Ölfusá. (Part of the East volcanic zone (EVZ)) Note: Bárðarbunga 6600 BC is also described as "about 8,600 years ago, with a total volume of 21 to 30 cubic kilometres and covering approximately 950 square kilometres."
Circa 5,800 BC	Hveravellir?			The Kjalhraun (hraun means "lava field") lava field is about 7,800 years old.
5000 BC	Hekla	EVZ		Hekla's first acidic eruption. Deposited the H5 ash layer, found in soil in the central highlands and in many parts of the North.
Circa 6,500 BP	Kerið			A volcanic crater lake located in the Grímsnes area. It is believed that Kerið was a cone volcano which erupted and emptied its magma reserve. Once the magma was depleted, the weight of the cone collapsed into the empty magma chamber. The pool of water at the bottom of the crater is at the same level as the water table and is not caused by rainfall.
6000 BP				The Stórhöfði peninsula was formed to the south of Helgafell on the island of Heimaey.
5000 BP	Bláfjöll Volcanic System			Lava flow reached Reykjavík 20 km (12 mi) west.
3350 BCE (?)	Prestahnúkur			Volcano in the west of the Highlands of Iceland to the west of Langjökull glacier.
3,900 BC	Hekla H-Sv			
3550 BC	Thórðarhyrna			An eruption in 3550 BC ± 500 years poured out 150,000,000 cubic meters of lava in the area of Bergvatnsárhraun, to the south of Thordarhyrna.
3500 BC	Grímsnes	SISZ	3	The Grímsneshraun lava-fields in the area cover a total of 54 km^{2} (21 sq mi). The total volume of lava produced in the lava flows of Grímsnes has been estimated at 1.2 cubic kilometres (0.29 cu mi).
5200 BP	Leitin	RVZ		A Holocene, effusive eruption, shield volcano on the Reykjanes peninsula, 25 km (16 mi) south of Reykjavík. Part of the Brennisteinsfjöll volcanic system and therefore of the Reykjanes Volcanic Belt.
3,000 BC	Helgafell			Formed from a secondary eruption on the Stórhöfði peninsula. Vestmannaeyjar (Westman Islands). Heimaey.
2500 BC	Hekla	EVZ		The H4 eruption.
4,000 BP	Thríhnúkagígur	RVZ		An eruption in the volcanic system of Brennisteinsfjöll covered an area of 3,270 square metres (35,200 sq ft) to a depth of 213 meters (699 ft), It is the only volcano in the world where visitors can take an elevator into the magma chamber. The magma that would normally fill the chamber and become sealed is believed to have drained away, revealing the rift beneath the surface.
1200 BC				Veiðivatnasvæði, Búrfellshraun flowed from a series of craters near Veiðivötn, on the one hand to Þórisós and on the other hand down with Tungná and Þjórsá all the way down to Landsveit
1130 BC	Hengill	RVZ		A volcanic table mountain situated in the southwest. The range covers an area of about 4 by 7 km^{2}. It is still active, evidenced by its numerous hot springs and fumaroles, but the last eruption occurred approximately 2,000 years ago, before the settlement of Iceland.
1000 BC	Katla	EVZ		Two ash layers in the South and the Reykjanes peninsula.
Circa 1,000-900 BC	Hekla	EVZ	5	The H3 eruption, considered the most severe eruption of Hekla during the Holocene. The eruption threw about 7.3 cubic kilometres (1.8 cu mi) of volcanic rock into the atmosphere, placing its Volcanic Explosivity Index (VEI) at 5. This would have cooled temperatures in the Northern Hemisphere for several years afterwards. Traces have been identified in Scottish peat bogs, and dendrochronology shows a decade of negligible tree ring growth in Ireland. An eighteen-year span of global cooling that is recorded in Irish bog oaks has been attributed to H-3. The eruption is detectable in Greenland ice cores, the bristlecone pine sequence, and the Irish oak sequence of extremely narrow growth rings. A research team led by Baker dated it to 1021 BC ±130. Some Egyptologists have dated the eruption to 1159 BC, and blamed it for famines under Ramesses III during the wider Bronze Age collapse.
Circa 900 BC	Theistareykjarbunga (Þeistareykjarbunga).	NVZ		The third of three dated eruptions.
800 BC (± 300 years)	Fremrinámur	NVZ		It is at the junction of the Mid-Atlantic Ridge and the Greenland–Iceland–Faeroe Ridge. It is one of five volcanic systems found in the axial rift zone in north east Iceland.
circa 500 BC	Hverfjall	NVZ		A tephra cone or Phreatomagmatic eruption in northern Iceland. The eruption was in the southern part of the Krafla fissure swarm.
400 BC	Stóra-Eldborg undir Geitahlíð			Lava flowed 2.5 km to the sea.
300 BC	Mývatn	NVZ		Large fissure eruption pouring out basaltic lava. The lava flowed down the valley Laxárdalur to the lowland plain of Aðaldalur where it entered the Arctic Ocean about 50 km (31 mi) away from Mývatn. The crater row that was formed on top of the eruptive fissure is called Þrengslaborgir (or Lúdentsborgir).
150 AD ± 75 years	Hengill,	WVZ		Fissure vent eruption.
Circa 50-350 CE	Snæfellsjökull	SVB		The latest eruption took place circa 50-350 CE and released approximately 0.11 km^{3} (144,000,000 cu yd) of volcanic material. The eruption was explosive and originated from the summit crater, and may have produced lava flows.
536				The Volcanic winter of 536 was the most severe and protracted episode of climatic cooling in the Northern Hemisphere in the last 2,000 years. The source of the eruption remains to be found. Icelandic volcanos were proposed. However, the cryptotephras dated exactly to AD 536 are geochemically distinct from Icelandic tephra, and the shards in the Swiss glacier have large age uncertainty.
751-763 ± 2	Katla			The Hrafnkatla (AT-8 or E2) series of eruptions, including large eruptions in 757 and 763 ± 2 with total tephra volume greater than 4,500 km^{3} (1,100 cu mi)
753 ± 2	Grímsvötn			From ice core data
781 ± 2	Grímsvötn			From ice core data

=== 9th century ===
Dates are approximate. (Note: First Norse settlers arrived in 870/874.) Please see individual articles that may have more date detail.

- circa 800 – Vatnafjöll. A 40 km (25 mi) long, 9 km (6 mi) wide basaltic fissure vent system. It is part of the same system as Hekla. More than two dozen eruptions have occurred at Vatnafjöll during the Holocene Epoch. (Part of the East volcanic zone (EVZ))

- 822 – Katla. An effusive eruption with large jökulhlaup dated within 6 months between late 822 to early 823 CE by tree ring data.

- circa 870 – Torfajökull. A stratovolcano, caldera and complex of subglacial volcanoes. The largest area of silicic extrusive rocks in Iceland. (Part of the East volcanic zone (EVZ))

- 877 – Ash and lava eruptions in Vatnaöldur in so called "Settlement eruption" dated to 877 ± 2 CE. The craters resulted from 65 kilometres (40 mi) (or 42 kilometres (26 mi)) long volcanic fissures within the area of a lake. The mainly explosive eruptions emitted 5–10 km^{3} (1.2–2.4 cu mi) of tholeiite basalt. The first eruption since human settlement of Iceland was the Vatnaöldur (Bárðarbunga) eruption, which had a volcanic explosivity index (VEI) of 4. (It is part of the East volcanic zone (EVZ))

=== 10th century ===
- 900 – Afstapahraun. (Part of the Reykjanes volcanic zone (RVZ))

- 900 – Vatnajökull (Part of the East volcanic zone (EVZ))

- 900 – Krafla (Part of the North volcanic zone (NVZ))
- 900 – Hallmundarhraun lava flows.
- 900 – Rauðhálsahraun in Hnappadalur

- 905 – Vatnajökull. (Part of the East volcanic zone (EVZ))
- 920 – Reykjanes, location uncertain, but tuff layer from the eruption is known. (Part of the Reykjanes volcanic zone (RVZ))

- 920 – Katla (ash layer called Katla-R). (Part of the East volcanic zone (EVZ))

- 939 (or 934) – Katla and Eldgjá: VEI 6. Dated now to 939 ± 2 CE. A large lava flow from Eldgjá flowed over Álftaver, Meðalland and Landbrot. The eruption was the largest flood basalt in historic time (800 square kilometres (310 sq mi), 18 cubic kilometres (4.3 cu mi) of magma.) Evidence from tree rings in the Northern Hemisphere indicates that 940 was one of the coolest summers in 1500 years. Summer average temperatures in Central Europe, Scandinavia, Canada, Alaska, and Central Asia were 2 °C lower than normal. Probably the earthquake from which Molda-Gnúpur and his people fled according to "Settlement". Landnáma also tells about the formation of Sólheimasandur in the great course of the Jökulsá river. (Part of the East volcanic zone (EVZ))

- 940 – Vatnajökull / Veiðivötn (volcanic layer in NA-land) (Part of the East volcanic zone (EVZ))

- 960 – Ljósufjöll is a fissure vent system and central volcano on the Snæfellsnes Peninsula. This 960±10 CE eruption is the only one on the peninsula in recorded history.
- 999 or 1000 – Svínahraun (lava)

- 1000 – Katla. A tuff layer survives. (Part of the East volcanic zone (EVZ))

- Circa 1000 – Hveravellir. A volcanic system in the Arnarvatnsheiði. The craters of this system produced the lava field Hallmundarhraun which extends some 50 kilometres (31 mi) westward into the valley of the Hvítá.

=== 11th century ===
- c. 1060 – Vatnajökull. (Part of the East volcanic zone (EVZ))

=== 12th century ===
- 1104 – Hekla (H1). Its first and greatest eruption in historical time. Heavy ash fall to the north and northeast. Þjórsárdalur was destroyed, including the farm named Stöng. (Part of the East volcanic zone (EVZ))

- 1151-1188 Krýsuvík fires. Volcanic activity in a fissure swarm known as Krýsuvík on the Reykjanes peninsula. Eruption in Ögmundarhraun and Kapelluhraun. (Part of the Reykjanes volcanic zone (RVZ))

- 1158 – Hekla, second eruption. A VEI 4 eruption began on 19 January 1158 producing over 0.15 km^{3} of lava and 0.2 km^{3} of tephra. It is likely to be the source of the Efrahvolshraun lava on Hekla's west. (Part of the East volcanic zone (EVZ))

- c. 1160 - ? in Vatnajökull (Vatnajökli). (Part of the East volcanic zone (EVZ))
- 1160-1180 – Two eruptions in the sea off Reykjanes (ash layer known). (Part of the Reykjanes volcanic zone (RVZ))

- 1179 – Katla. Sources are unclear, but ash layers found in Greenland Glaciers. (Part of the East volcanic zone (EVZ))
- 1188 - ? Rjúpnadyngju lava flow and Mávahlíða lava flow. Rjúpnadyngjuhraun og Mávahlíðahraun runnu

=== 13th century ===
- 1206 – Hekla, eruption number 3. (Part of the East volcanic zone (EVZ))

- 1206 – Reykjanes peninsula. 1206? Information and No volcanic eruption had occurred for 815 years on the Reykjanes Peninsula until 19 March 2021 when a fissure vent appeared in Geldingadalir to the south of Fagradalsfjall mountain. (Reykjanes 1210-1240?)

- 1210-1211 – from Reykjanes. Eldey formed. (Part of the Reykjanes volcanic zone (RVZ))

- 1222 – Hekla, eruption number 4. (Part of the East volcanic zone (EVZ))
- 1223 – off Reykjanes, location uncertain. (Part of the Reykjanes volcanic zone (RVZ))
- 1225 – off Reykjanes, location uncertain. (Part of the Reykjanes volcanic zone (RVZ))
- 1226-1227 – some eruptions in Reykjanes. They are owned by Yngra Stampahraun, (Klofningahraun), Eldvarpahraun, Illahraun and Arnarseturshraun. Sandy winter due to a large ash eruption at Reykjanestá and the so-called Medieval Valley fell. Famine as a result. (Part of the Reykjanes volcanic zone (RVZ))
- 1231 – off Reykjanes, location uncertain. (Part of the Reykjanes volcanic zone (RVZ))
- 1238 – off Reykjanes, location uncertain. (Part of the Reykjanes volcanic zone (RVZ))
- 1240 – off Reykjanes, location uncertain. (Part of the Reykjanes volcanic zone (RVZ))

- 1245 – Katla. Fire and lava from Sólheimajökull. (Part of the East volcanic zone (EVZ))
- 1262 – Katla. Fire with heavy ash fall in Sólheimajökull. The last people at Sólheimasandur. (Part of the East volcanic zone (EVZ))

- 1300-1301 – Hekla, eruption number 5. Heavy ash fall in Skagafjörður and famine as a result.. (Part of the East volcanic zone (EVZ))

=== 14th century ===
- 1311 – Katla. Darkness in the Eastfjords and ash fall in many parts of the country. Major lava flow, probably on Mýrdalssandur, but sources are unclear and contradictory. Crop and hay failure the following year with associated casualties. (Part of the East volcanic zone (EVZ))

- 1332 – in Vatnajökull (Vatnajökli), probably in Grímsvötn. (Part of the East volcanic zone (EVZ))

- 1340 - ? Brennisteinsfjöll (no lava from the 14th century known on the Reykjanes peninsula). (Part of the Reykjanes volcanic zone (RVZ))

- 1341 – Brennisteinsfjöll. The last eruption in the Brennisteinsfjöll volcanic system was a VEI-2 eruption in 1341. (Part of the Reykjanes volcanic zone (RVZ)).

- 1341 – Hekla, eruption number 6. The ash spread west through Borgarfjörður and Akranes. Great death, especially in Rangárvellir) and many settlements were destroyed. (Part of the East volcanic zone (EVZ))

- 1341 - ? Grímsvötn. (Part of the East volcanic zone (EVZ))
- 1341 – (± 1 year) Brennisteinsfjöll, a VEI-2 eruption. One of the bigger lava flows, runs south to the coast at Herdísarvík bay forming lava falls on their way.

- 1354 - ? Grímsvötn. (Part of the East volcanic zone (EVZ))

- 1357 – Katla. Extensive eruption and damage. (Part of the East volcanic zone (EVZ))

- 1362 – Knappafellsjökull. The largest ash eruption in Icelandic history. Litla-Hérað (Öræfasveit) was completely destroyed and few seem to have escaped. The group was called Öræfi when it started to rebuild and the glacier Öræfajökull. Most of the ash was carried east to the sea, but destroyed much of Hornafjörður and Lónshverfi along the way. Jökulhlaup to Skeiðarársandur and out to sea. (Part of the Öræfajökull volcanic belt (OVB))
- 1372 – north-west of Grímseyjar

- 1389-1390 – in and around Hekla, eruption number 7. Norðurhraun lava flows, Skarð, Tjaldastaðir and maybe more farms are subsumed. (Part of the East volcanic zone (EVZ))

=== 15th century ===
- 1416 – Katla. (Part of the East volcanic zone (EVZ))
- 1422 – off Reykjanes an island is formed and lasts for several years. (Part of the Reykjanes volcanic zone (RVZ))

- 1440 – Hekla or surroundings. (Part of the East volcanic zone (EVZ))

- 1477 – Torfajökull. A stratovolcano, caldera and complex of subglacial volcanoes. The largest area of silicic extrusive rocks in Iceland. (Part of the East volcanic zone (EVZ))

- 1477 – Landmannalaugar in the Highlands of Iceland. It is at the edge of Laugahraun lava field, which was formed around 1477. Note: This remote event appears to also be referred to as Bárðarbunga, the largest known Icelandic eruption, with a VEI of 6. (Part of the East volcanic zone (EVZ))

- 1477 – at Heljargjárrein. Eruption on a long fissure in Veiðivötn west of Vatnajökull.

- c. 1480 – 1500 – Katla. (Part of the East volcanic zone (EVZ))
- about 1500 – in Vatnajökull. (Part of the East volcanic zone (EVZ))

=== 16th century ===
- 1510 – Hekla eruption number 8. A large eruption with heavy ash fall to the south. The largest Hekla lava field from historical times. Extensive land degradation in Rangárvallasýsla as a result. (Part of the East volcanic zone (EVZ))

- 1554 – Vondubjallar southwest of Hekla. The eruption lasted for 6 weeks in the spring. Red bells formed and from them flowed Pálssteinshraun. (Part of the East volcanic zone (EVZ))

- 1580 – Katla. (Part of the East volcanic zone (EVZ))
- c. 1582 – at Eldey

- 1597 – Hekla, eruption number 9. From 3 January into the summer. Volcanic eruptions were widespread but caused little living space, although mainly in Mýrdalur. (Part of the East volcanic zone (EVZ))

- 1598 – Grímsvötn. (Part of the East volcanic zone (EVZ))

=== 17th century ===
- 1603 – Grímsvötn. (Part of the East volcanic zone (EVZ))

- 1612 – Katla (and / or Eyjafjallajökull). The eruption began on 16 October, but sources do not agree on location, Katla is considered more likely. (Part of the East volcanic zone (EVZ))

- 1619 – Grímsvötn. (Part of the East volcanic zone (EVZ))

- 1625 – Katla, 2–14 September. Large eruption with heavy ash fall to the east. Twenty-five farms were deserted. Þorsteinn Magnússon, abbot of Þykkvabær, wrote a report on the eruption, the first of its kind in Iceland. (Part of the East volcanic zone (EVZ))

- 1629 – Grímsvötn. (Part of the East volcanic zone (EVZ))

- 1636-37 – Hekla, eruption number 10 began on 8 May and lasted for over a year. Ash fall to the northeast and little damage. (Part of the East volcanic zone (EVZ))
- 1637-38 – by the Westman Islands

- 1638 – Grímsvötn. (Part of the East volcanic zone (EVZ))

- 1655 -? probably an eruption in Vatnajökull, probably in Kverkfjöll. Big lava flow in Jökulsá á Fjöllum.

- 1659 – Grímsvötn. (Part of the East volcanic zone (EVZ))

- 1660-61 – Katla. The eruption began on 3 November and lasted until the end of the year. A small ash fall but a large flow on Mýrdalssandur and cut Höfðabrekka off. (Part of the East volcanic zone (EVZ))

- 1681 – in Vatnajökull. (Part of the East volcanic zone (EVZ))

- 1684-85 – Grímsvötn. A major lava flow in Jökulsá á Fjöllum, one person died and a number of livestock.. (Part of the East volcanic zone (EVZ))

- 1693 – Hekla, eruption number 11 began on 13 February and lasted until the autumn. Heavy ash fall to the northwest at the beginning of the eruption which caused great and permanent damage in the surrounding areas. (Part of the East volcanic zone (EVZ))

- 1693 – Katla. (Part of the East volcanic zone (EVZ))
- 1697 – in Vatnajökull. (Part of the East volcanic zone (EVZ))

=== 18th century ===
- 1701-1864 Bárðarbunga. Studies of tephra layers have shown that a number of eruptions occurred beneath the glacier, probably in the north-east of the crater or in Bárðarbunga. There have also been smaller eruptions in an ice-free area of Dyngjuháls Icelandic pronunciation: [ˈtiɲcʏˌhauls] to the north-east. Eruptions appear to follow a cycle: there were several eruptions in the glacier between 1701 and 1740 and since 1780. (Part of the East volcanic zone (EVZ))

- 1702 – in Vatnajökull. (Part of the East volcanic zone (EVZ))

- 1706 – in Vatnajökull. (Part of the East volcanic zone (EVZ))

- 1711-12 – Kverkfjöll

- 1716 – in Vatnajökull. (Part of the East volcanic zone (EVZ))

- 1717 – in Vatnajökull. (Part of the East volcanic zone (EVZ))

- 1721 – Katla. Heavy ash fall, about 1 km^{3} (0.24 cu mi) and a big lava flow. (Part of the East volcanic zone (EVZ))

- 1724-29 – Mývatnseldar (Myvatn Fires, Krafla Fires). Lava flowed into Lake Mývatn and the volcanic "Viti crater" (Hell crater) formed by Krafla volcano. (Part of the North volcanic zone (NVZ))

- 1725 – in Vatnajökull

- 1725 – southeast of Hekla. (Part of the East volcanic zone (EVZ))

- 1726 – in Vatnajökull

- 1727 – Öræfajökull, at the glacier roots above Sandfellsskerji. 3 died. (Part of the Öræfajökull volcanic belt (OVB))

- 1729 – Kverkfjöll

- 1746 – Mývatnseldar, (Myvatn Fires, Krafla Fires). 1 eruption. (Part of the North volcanic zone (NVZ))
- 1753 – southwest of Grímsvatn

- 1755-56 – Katla. The eruption began on 17 October and lasted until mid-February. A large amount of ash, about 1.5 km^{3} (0.36 cu mi), reached the northeast and caused great damage in Skaftártunga, Álftaveri and Síða. A big lava flow on Mýrdalssandur, mostly west of Hafursey. Lightning killed two people. About 50 farms were deserted, most of them only temporarily. (Part of the East volcanic zone (EVZ))

- 1766 – west of Vatnajökull, probably in Bárðarbunga. (Part of the East volcanic zone (EVZ))

- 1766-68 – Hekla, eruption number 12. The largest lava eruption of Hekla in historical time. Ash fall in Húnavatns- and Skagafjarðarsýsla counties. 10 lands were deserted. (Part of the East volcanic zone (EVZ))

- 1774 – Grímsvötn. (Part of the East volcanic zone (EVZ))

- 1783 – Nýey. Reykjaneshrygg, southwest of Eldey. The island of Nýey rose from the sea with intense, poisonous, sulphurous smoke, but disappeared in less than a year. (Part of the Reykjanes volcanic zone (RVZ))

- 1783-84 Laki / Lakagigar. ( Skaftáreldar, Grímsvötn, Þórðarhyrna, sometimes referred to in Icelandic as the Skaftáreldur, Skaftá Fires) Lava flowed along Skaftá river valley and Hverfisfljót, down into the lowlands and covered about 580 km^{2} (220 sq mi) (including a gorge thought to have been 200 metres (660 ft) deep). The eruption has been estimated to have killed over six million people globally. Ash fall and poisoning caused hay failure leading to a famine that killed about 25% of the island's population and resulted in a drop in global temperatures, as sulfur dioxide was spewed into the Northern Hemisphere. This caused crop failures in Europe and may have caused droughts in India. (Part of the East volcanic zone (EVZ))

- 1797 – Grímsvötn. (Part of the East volcanic zone (EVZ))

=== 19th century ===
- 1807 – Grímsvötn. (Part of the East volcanic zone (EVZ))

- 1816 – Grímsvötn. (Part of the East volcanic zone (EVZ))

- 1821 – Katla. (Part of the East volcanic zone (EVZ))

- 1821-23 – Eyjafjallajökull. The eruption began weakly on 19 December, no lava flowed but some ash fell. Subsequently, lava flowed north to Markarfljót. (Part of the East volcanic zone (EVZ))

- 1823 – Vatnajökull. (Part of the East volcanic zone (EVZ))

- 1830 – Eldeyjarboði. Submarine eruption. (Part of the Reykjanes volcanic zone (RVZ))

- 1830 – Geirfuglasker. Submarine eruption. (Part of the Reykjanes volcanic zone (RVZ)) May be the same as adjacent Eldeyjarboði 1830 above.

- 1838 – Grímsvötn. (Part of the East volcanic zone (EVZ))

- 1845-46 – Hekla, eruption number 13 began on 2 September and lasted for about seven months. Heavy ash fall to the southeast and a lava flow in Ytri-Rangá. Lava flowed west and northwest, about 25 km^{2} (9.7 sq mi), so the farm of Næfurholt had to be relocated. (Part of the East volcanic zone (EVZ))

- 1854 – Grímsvötn. (Part of the East volcanic zone (EVZ))

- 1860 – Katla. A small eruption. (Part of the East volcanic zone (EVZ))

- ? 1861 – Grímsvötn. (Part of the East volcanic zone (EVZ))

- 1862-64 – at Heljargjárrein. The eruption began on 30 June in a 15 km (9.3 mi) long fissure north of Tungnaárjökull. Trollagígar formed there and Tröllahraun flowed from them.

- 1867 – Grímsvötn. (Part of the East volcanic zone (EVZ))
- 1867-68 – Mánáreyjar. Submarine eruption.

- 1867-68 – Tjörnes Fracture Zone.

- 1872 – in Vatnajökull. (Part of the East volcanic zone (EVZ))

- 1873 – Grímsvötn. (Part of the East volcanic zone (EVZ))

- 1874 – Askja. Likely eruption in February. Gas was seen. (Part of the North volcanic zone (NVZ))

- 1875 January – Askja. Lava eruption began on 3 January. Sigketill began to form later that month. (Part of the North volcanic zone (NVZ))

- 1875 February – Askja. A lava eruption began in Sveinagjá in Mývatnsöræf on 18 February on a 25 km (16 mi) long fissure. It lasted until mid-August and flowed from Nýjahraun. It is believed to be a magma flow from Askja. (Part of the North volcanic zone (NVZ))

- 1875 March – Askja One of the largest ash eruptions in Icelandic history began on 28 March and lasted for about eight hours. Eruption from Víti and other craters. Heavy damage from ash fall in the middle of East Iceland and many farms were deserted. Many East Fjord people moved to the West as a result. Öskjuvatn was formed and it grew steadily. Eruptions occurred for several months. (Part of the North volcanic zone (NVZ))

- 1876 – Askja. The last flame was seen at the end of the year. (Part of the North volcanic zone (NVZ))

- 1876 – in Vatnajökull. (Part of the East volcanic zone (EVZ))

- 1878 – Krakatindur, located in the county of Rangárvallasýsla, east of Hekla. Last erupted in 1878. Part of the East volcanic zone (EVZ)
- 1879 – Geirfuglasker. Submarine eruption.

- 1883 – Grímsvötn. (Part of the East volcanic zone (EVZ))
- ? 1884 – Near Eldey. Submarine eruption. Unclear sources.

- ? 1885 – Grímsvötn. (Part of the East volcanic zone (EVZ))

- 1887 – Grímsvötn. (Part of the East volcanic zone (EVZ))

- 1887-1889 Thórðarhyrna, There is a mechanical interaction between Thordarhyrna and Grimsvötn. An eruption between 1887 and 1889 had a VEI of 2.

- 1889 – Grímsvötn. (Part of the East volcanic zone (EVZ))

- 1892 – Grímsvötn. (Part of the East volcanic zone (EVZ))
- ? 1896 – Probable eruption south of the Westman Islands

- 1897 – Grímsvötn. (Part of the East volcanic zone (EVZ))

=== 20th century ===
- 1902-04 – Grímsvötn. (Part of the East volcanic zone (EVZ))

- 1902-1904 Thórðarhyrna, There is a mechanical interaction between Thordarhyrna and Grimsvötn. The combined eruption from Grimsvötn had a Volcanic Explosivity Index (VEI) of 4.

- 1905-06 – Grímsvötn. (Part of the East volcanic zone (EVZ))

- 1908-09 – Grímsvötn. (Part of the East volcanic zone (EVZ))

- 1910 – Grímsvötn. Ashfall was observed in the east of the country from June to November. This eruption has been assigned by some to Thórðarhyrna which has geological interactions with Grímsvötn, although not in official databases It may also be linked to the Loki-Fögrufjöll eruption of the same year. (Part of the East volcanic zone (EVZ))

- 1910 Loki-Fögrufjöll The last confirmed eruption was in 1910 when tephra was erupted. (Part of the Bárðarbunga fissure system. 1910 was the last known eruption of Bárðarbunga before the 2014 eruptions.) It may also be linked to the Grímsvötn eruption of the same year.(Part of the East volcanic zone (EVZ))

- 1913 – Mundafell / Lambafit east of Hekla. (Part of the East volcanic zone (EVZ))

- 1918 – Katla. The 1918 eruption of Katla began on 12 October and ended on 5 November. The eruption reached a height of 14.3 km (8.9 mi) and caused considerable damage in Skaftártunga. Large jökulhlaup (meltwater-flood) left icebergs 60 m (200 ft) tall on Mýrdalssandur. (Part of the East volcanic zone (EVZ))

- 1921 – Askja. A small lava eruption. (Part of the North volcanic zone (NVZ))

- 1922 – Askja. A small lava eruption. (Part of the North volcanic zone (NVZ))

- 1922 – Grímsvötn. The eruption began at the end of September and ended within a month. (Part of the East volcanic zone (EVZ))

- 1923 – Askja. A small lava eruption. (Part of the North volcanic zone (NVZ))

- 1923 – Grímsvötn. Small eruption. (Part of the East volcanic zone (EVZ))

- 1926 – Askja. Eruption in the summer. A small island formed in Öskjuvatn. (Part of the North volcanic zone (NVZ))
- 1926 – at Eldey. Turbulence in the sea for several hours.

- 1927 – Esjufjöll. A small eruption, a lava flow off Breiðamerkurjökull and a Jökulhlaup (literally "glacial run") a type of glacial outburst flood). One person was killed. It is located at the SE part of the Vatnajökull icecap. (Part of the East volcanic zone (EVZ))

- 1929 – Askja (Part of the North volcanic zone (NVZ))

- 1929 – Kverkfjöll. A fire was seen for a long time during the summer.

- 1933 – Grímsvötn. Small eruption. (Part of the East volcanic zone (EVZ))

- 1934 – Grímsvötn. The eruption began at the end of March and lasted until mid-April.. (Part of the East volcanic zone (EVZ))
- 1930s – Gjálp An eruption took place in the 1930s. It had also caused a Jökulhlaup (literally "glacial run") a type of glacial outburst flood), but at the time, science could not yet analyze the events. The eruption remained subglacial. Might be the same as the following eruption north of Grímsvötn. (Part of the East volcanic zone (EVZ))

- 1938 – Grímsvötn. An eruption north of the caldera but did not emerge from the glacier ice. (Note: The 1996 eruption of Gjálp was precisely monitored, unlike the 1938). (Part of the East volcanic zone (EVZ))

- ? 1941 – Grímsvötn. Possible eruption. (Part of the East volcanic zone (EVZ))

- ? 1945 – Grímsvötn. Possible eruption. (Part of the East volcanic zone (EVZ))

- 1947-48 – Hekla, eruption number 14 began on 29 March with an explosion. First eruption in Hekla in over 100 years. The plume reached a height of 30 km (19 mi) ash fall to the south over Fljótshlíð and Eyjafjöll. Heklugjá opened lengthwise, about 0.8 km^{3} (0.19 cu mi) of lava flowed, mostly to the west and southwest from Axlargígur. One Icelandic geologist died while doing research at the eruption. (Part of the East volcanic zone (EVZ))

- ? 1954 – Grímsvötn. Possible eruption. (Part of the East volcanic zone (EVZ))

- ? 1955 – Katla. Probably a small eruption under the glacier. Jökulhlaup took several bridges. No ash or lava seen. (Part of the East volcanic zone (EVZ))

- 1961 – Askja. Lava eruption began on 26 October on a 300 m-long (980 ft) fissure and lasted until the end of November. (Part of the North volcanic zone (NVZ))

- 1961 – Dyngjufjöll. Basalt and rhyolite eruption within Vatnajökull National Park. (May be either the same as, or associated with, nearby Askja 1961 above.)

- 1961 – Trölladyngja. Reports of an eruption in 1961 at Trölladyngja are most likely attributed to nearby Askja Caldera, which erupted the same year.

- 1963- 67 – Vestmannaeyjar : Surtsey rose from the sea on 14 November in an underwater eruption southwest of Geirfuglasker. Later, the islands Syrtlingur and Jólnir were formed but soon disappeared again.

- 1970 – Hekla, eruption number 15 began on 5 May in the southwestern part of Heklugjár and in Skjólkvíar north of the mountain. Considerable ash fall to NNV, all the way north to Húnavatnssýslur. In the mountain itself the activity stopped after a few days but in Skjólkvíar it erupted for about 2 months. (Part of the East volcanic zone (EVZ))

- 1973 – Eldfell, Westman Islands, VEI 3. A 1,600 m-long (5,200 ft) eruption fissure opens east of the town Vestamnnaeyar on the island Heimaey on 23 January. About a third of the town was buried under lava, over 400 properties were destroyed. The lava front was cooled by pumping seawater on it, it saved the important harbour entrance. A volcano formed and Heimaey expanded to the east.

- 1975 – Krafla fires, 1st eruption 20 December. Lava eruption from a short fissure at Leirhnjúkur. Note: Mývatnseldar, (Myvatn Fires, Krafla Fires), Lake Mývatn and the volcanic "Viti crater" (Hell crater) formed by Krafla. (Part of the North volcanic zone (NVZ))

- 1977 – Krafla fires, 2nd eruption 27–29 April. (Part of the North volcanic zone (NVZ))

- 1977 – Krafla fires, 3rd eruption 8–9 September. (Part of the North volcanic zone (NVZ))

- 1980 – Krafla fires, 4th eruption 16 March. (Part of the North volcanic zone (NVZ))

- 1980 – Krafla fires, 5th eruption 10–18 July. (Part of the North volcanic zone (NVZ))

- 1980-81 – Hekla, eruption number 16 began on 17 August and lasted until the 20th. Ash spread to the north, lava flowed mostly to the west and north. The eruption resumed on 9 April of the following year and ended on 16 April. (Part of the East volcanic zone (EVZ))

- 1980 – Krafla fires, 6th eruption, 18–23 October. (Part of the North volcanic zone (NVZ)) (Part of the North volcanic zone (NVZ))

- 1981 – Krafla fires, 7th eruption, 30 January – 4 February. (Part of the North volcanic zone (NVZ))

- 1981 – Krafla fires, 8th eruption, 18–23 November. (Part of the North volcanic zone (NVZ))

- 1983 – Grímsvötn. A small eruption at the end of May. (Part of the East volcanic zone (EVZ))

- ? 1984 – Grímsvötn. Probably a small eruption. (Part of the East volcanic zone (EVZ))

- 1984 – Krafla fires, 9th eruption, 4–18 September. (Part of the North volcanic zone (NVZ))

- ? 1985 – Final ridge under Vatnajökull. Possible eruption. small earthquakes and sigg boilers in the glacier.

- 1986 Loki-Fögrufjöll Possible subglacial eruption – the last confirmed eruption was in 1910. (Part of the Bárðarbunga fissure system. See Loki-Fögrufjöll 1910 above).

- 1991 – Hekla, eruption number 17 began on 17 January in the southern part of Heklugjár but soon subsided. One crater east of the mountain was active until 17 March. A considerable amount of lava flowed on the south side of the mountain, but there was little ash fall. (Part of the East volcanic zone (EVZ))

- 1991 Loki-Fögrufjöll Possible subglacial eruption – the last confirmed eruption was in 1910. (Part of the Bárðarbunga fissure system. See Loki-Fögrufjöll 1910 above).

- 1996 – 1996 eruption of Gjálp (Gjálpargosið / Bárðarbunga). An eruption began on 30 September in a 4–5 km (2.5–3.1 mi) fissure under Vatnajökull between Bárðarbunga and Grímsvötn and lasted until 13 October. The seismic activity indicated a magma flow from Bárðarbunga. Melting water flowed to Grímsvötn and filled the subglacial lake to highest level ever recorded. The long-awaited jökulhlaup then submerged Skeiðarársandur on 5 November, damaging several bridges. (Part of the East volcanic zone (EVZ))

- 1998 – Grímsvötn. 18–28 December. (Part of the East volcanic zone (EVZ))

- 2000 – Hekla, eruption number 18. 26 February – 8 March. (Part of the East volcanic zone (EVZ))

=== 21st century ===
- 2004 – Grímsvötn. The eruption began on 1 November. (Part of the East volcanic zone (EVZ))

- 2006 Loki-Fögrufjöll Possible subglacial eruption – the last confirmed eruption was in 1910. (Part of the Bárðarbunga fissure system. See Loki-Fögrufjöll 1910 above).

- 2008 Loki-Fögrufjöll Possible subglacial eruption – the last confirmed eruption was in 1910. (Part of the Bárðarbunga fissure system. See Loki-Fögrufjöll 1910 above).

- 2010 – Eyjafjallajökull. The eruption began at Fimmvörðuháls on 20 March. (Part of the East volcanic zone (EVZ))

- 2010 – Eyjafjallajökull. The VEI 4 eruption began in Eyjafjallajökull on 14 April. It caused major disruption to air travel in Northwestern Europe and across the North Atlantic, not seen before. (Part of the East volcanic zone (EVZ))

- 2010 – Bárðarbunga. On 26 September 2010, an earthquake swarm was recorded with over 30 earthquakes measuring up to 3.7M_{W} on the moment magnitude scale. Part of the East volcanic zone (EVZ))

- 2011 – Grímsvötn. (2011 eruption of Grímsvötn), The Plinian eruption began on 21 May and caused major disruption to air travel in Northwestern Europe from 22 to 25 May 2011. (Part of the East volcanic zone (EVZ))

- 2011 Loki-Fögrufjöll Possible subglacial eruption – the last confirmed eruption was in 1910. (Part of the Bárðarbunga fissure system. See Loki-Fögrufjöll 1910 above).

- 2014-15 – Holuhraun. The eruption began on 29 August 2014, and ended on 28 February 2015. (Part of the North volcanic zone (NVZ))

- 2014-15 Bárðarbunga. (main article – Bárðarbunga). In August 2014, a swarm of around 1,600 earthquakes in 48 hours, with magnitudes up to 4.5M_{W}, was followed on 23 August by the USGS Aviation Color Codes being raised from orange to red, indicating an eruption in progress. The following day, the aviation risk was lowered from red to orange and the statement that there was an eruption in progress was retracted. However, later aerial observations of glacial depressions southeast of the volcano suggested that the now-retracted report of an eruption had been correct and that a short eruption did occur under the ice, but the lack of further melting indicated that this eruption had now ceased. Then, a new fissure eruption breached the surface between Bárðarbunga and Askja, in the Holuhraun lava field, in the early hours of 29 August. This was followed by a second fissure eruption in the Holuhraun area, along the same volcanic fissure, which started shortly after 4 am on 31 August. Part of the East volcanic zone (EVZ))

- 2021 – Fagradalsfjall. The eruption began in the valley Geldingadalir on 19 March and the lava ("Fagradalshraun") flowed into the Meradalir and Nátthagi valleys. (Part of the Reykjanes volcanic zone (RVZ))

- 2022 – Fagradalsfjall. The eruption began in the valley Meradalir on 3 August on top of a lava flow from the previous year's eruption. (Part of the Reykjanes volcanic zone (RVZ))

- 2023 – Litli-Hrútur eruption (Fagradalsfjall 3). 63°55′7.12″N 22°12′25.65″W. The eruption began at 16:40 UTC on 10 July, north of the Litli-Hrútur (English translation: Little Ram) volcanic fell, with considerable lava flow. (Part of the Reykjanes volcanic zone (RVZ))

- 2023-2025 – Sundhnúkur eruptions, Reykjanes Peninsula, near Grindavík.

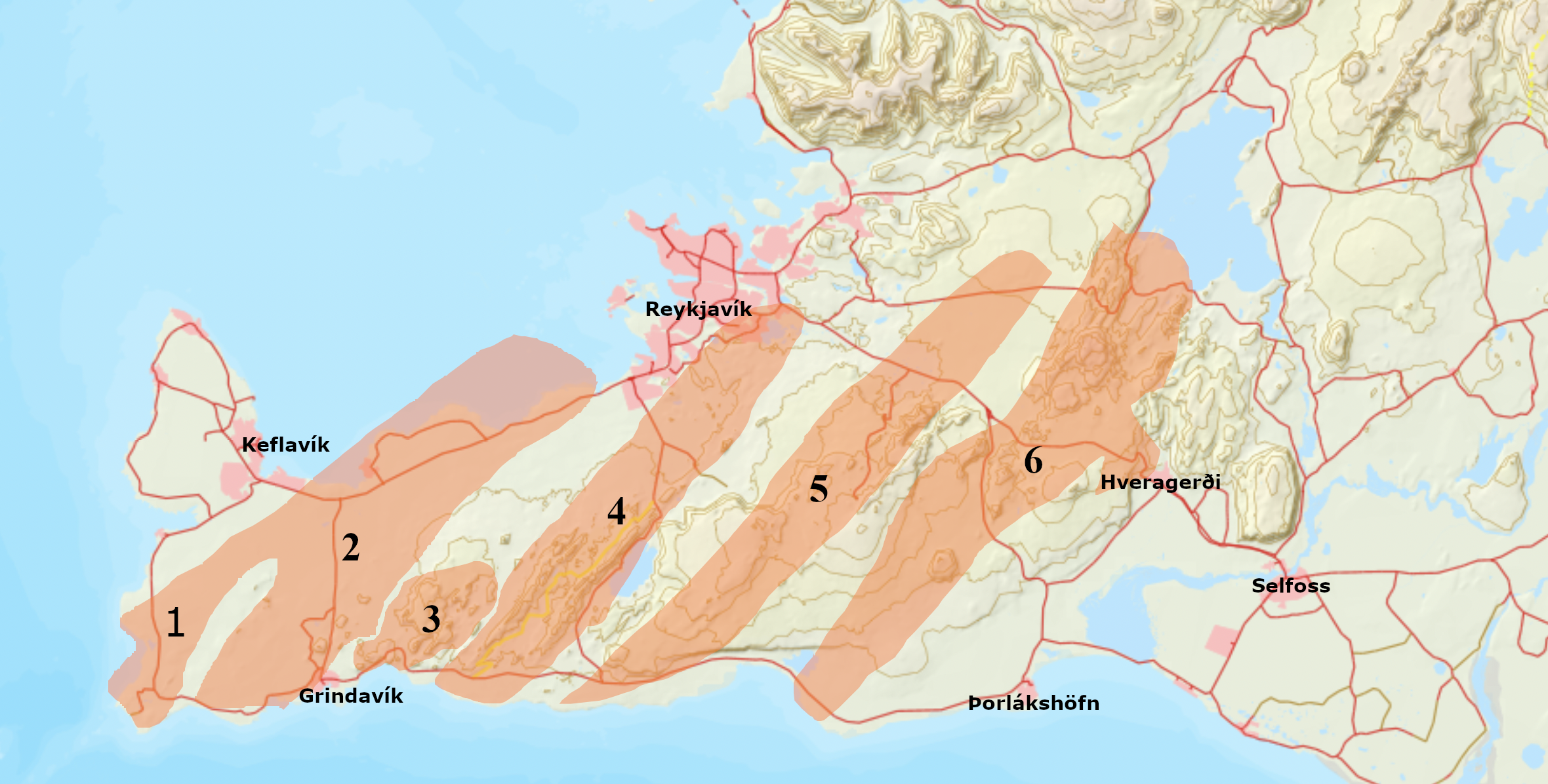
Map of volcanic systems on the Reykjanes Peninsula. Grindavík is at the southern end of the Eldvörp-Svartsengi system (marked here as 2)

A series of lava fissure eruptions began on 18 December 2023 at the Sundhnúkur crater chain (63°52′45″N 22°23′14″W) north of the town of Grindavík. No volcanic eruptions had occurred for 815 years on the Reykjanes Peninsula until 19 March 2021. (See Fagradalsfjall 2021) Part of the Reykjanes volcanic zone (RVZ).

- Sundhnúkur first eruption – began on 18 December 2023, around 22:00, at the Sundhnúkur crater chain and ended 3 days later on December 21. See (Main article : December 2023 eruption)

- Sundhnúkur second eruption – began in the early hours of 14 January 2024 (around 7:57 UTC) and ended on 16 January. It resulted in damage by lava to the outskirts of Grindavík. See (Main article : January 2024 eruption)

- Sundhnúkur third eruption – began on 8 February 2024 (around 6:07 UTC), about a kilometre north of Grindavík, in the same area as the December eruption. See (Main article : February 2024 eruption)

- Sundhnúkur fourth eruption – began on 16 March 2024 (at 20:23 UTC) in the same area as the February eruption. See (Main article : March 2024 eruption)

- Sundhnúkur fifth eruption – began on 29 May 2024 (at 12:45 UTC) and lasted until 22 June, being the largest in the Sundhnúkur series to date. See (Main article : May 2024 eruption)

- Sundhnúkur sixth eruption – began on 22 August 2024 (at 21:25 UTC) and finished 6 September. See (Main article : August 2024 eruption)

- Sundhnúkur seventh eruption – began on 20 November 2024 (at 23:14 UTC). and lasted for 18 days, ending on 8 December. See (Main article : November 2024 eruption)

- Sundhnúkur eighth eurption – began on 1 April 2025 (at 09:45 UTC) and lasted for approximately 7 hours.
- Sundhnúkur ninth eruption – began on 16 July 2025 (at 03:54 UTC) and lasted until 5 August, approximately 20 days.

== Eruptive activity ==
=== Grímsvötn eruptivity ===
Grímsvötn, including the Skaftá eruption of 1783, is probably the most eruptive volcano system. The Lakagígar lava field alone is estimated to have produced about 15 cubic kilometres (3.6 cu mi) of lava. Grímsvötn has probably had more than 30 eruptions in the last 400 years, and produced around 55 cubic kilometres (13 cu mi) over the last 10,000 years. (Part of the East volcanic zone (EVZ)) See Grímsvötn index above.

=== Katla eruptivity ===
Katla has erupted 17 times in historical times, and Eldgjá seems to be part of the same system. The total volume of volcanic eruptions from Katla over the last 10,000 years is very similar to Grímsvötn. (Part of the East volcanic zone (EVZ)). See Katla index above.

=== Hekla eruptivity ===
Hekla has erupted at least 17 times in historical times, with total volume about 7 cubic kilometres (1.7 cu mi), but around 42 cubic kilometres (10 cu mi) since the last ice age. (Part of the East volcanic zone (EVZ)). See Hekla index above.

== See also ==
- Volcanism of Iceland
  - List of volcanoes in Iceland
- Geology of Iceland
  - Geological deformation of Iceland
  - Geology of Reykjanes Peninsula
- Global Volcanism Program
