= Thordarhyrna =

Volcano in Iceland

- Þórðarhyrna
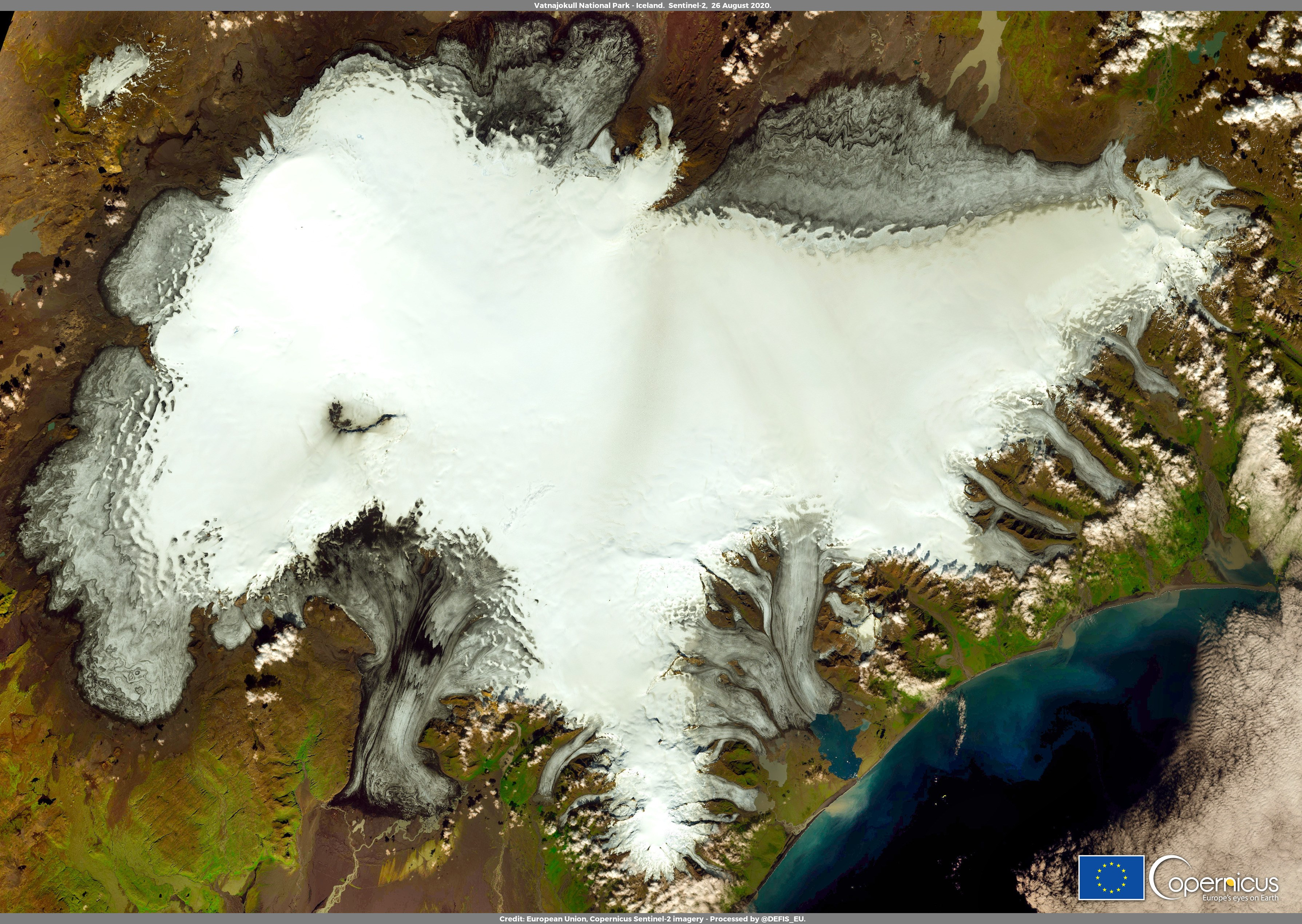
- Aerial view of south-east Vatnajokull (north is top)

Highest point
- Elevation: 1,650 m (5,410 ft)
- Listing: List of volcanoes in Iceland
- Coordinates: 64°12′4″N 17°0′17″W

Geography
- Location within Iceland
- Selected geological features near the Thordarhyrna central volcano and Grímsvötn volcanic system (red outlines). Legend: Other shading shows: calderas; central volcanoes; fissure swarms; subglacial terrain above 1,100 m (3,600 ft); seismically active areas; Clicking on the rectangle in the image enlarges to full window and enables mouse-over with more detail.

Geology
- Mountain type: Subglacial volcano/Icelandic stratovolcano
- Last eruption: 1904

Thordarhyrna (Icelandic: Þórðarhyrna [ˈθourðarˌhɪ(r)tna]) is one of seven subglacial volcanoes beneath the Vatnajokull glacier in Iceland. It is a paired active central volcano with Grímsvötn, and can be classified as part of the Grímsvötn-Laki volcanic system, with common fissure swarms to the south.

== Geography ==
Thordarhyrna central volcano is 15 km (9.3 mi) in diameter, and located north-east of the Síðujökull outlet glacier in a line that goes through the Háabunga ice cap feature of Vatnajokull on the way to the Grímsvötn caldera. To the immediate south-east of Thordarhyrna the outlet glacier has been called Djúpárjökull and to its east the outlet glacier has been called Grænalónsjökull. The central volcano Hamarinn of the Bárðarbunga volcanic system is to the north-east.

Most of the volcano is covered with between 100–600 m (330–1,970 ft) of ice and its highest point is about 1,650 m (5,410 ft). It is to the south-east of a higher ice covered ridge connecting it with Grímsvötn called Háabunga which reaches a height of 1,742 m (5,715 ft). The eastern flank of the volcano has an ice free area with a height of 1,355 m (4,446 ft) called Pálsfjall.

== Eruptions ==
The Thordarhyrna central volcano definitely erupted in a VEI 4 event, on the 28th of May 1903. This was associated with Grímsvötn activity, with the whole dual eruption period of activity extending from December 1902 to January 1904. No other eruption can be assigned with certainty to Thordarhyrna. Similar phreatomagmatic eruptions would erupt disruptive tephra.

The following eruptions are likely to have involved the Thordarhyrna central volcano:

- 15 August 1887 - 1889 with a VEI 2 event
- 4 February 1823 with a VEI 2 event
- 1753 with jökulhlaups in the rivers to the south-west side of Thordarhyrna.

An eruption south of Thordarhyrna in 3550 BC ± 500 years poured out 150,000,000 m^{3} (5.3×10^{9} cu ft) of lava in the area of Bergvatnsárhraun at the southern edge of Vatnajokull (Djúpárjökull) closest to Thordarhyrna.

The Borrobol tephra, which are believed to have an Icelandic origin, have been identified from Greenland, through to Scotland and Sweden and has layers dated from 16.65 to 12.77 BP, but the tephra is distinct from tephra assigned with certainty to currently active Icelandic central volcanoes. Greenland high resolution ice-core studies on tephra samples erupted on two occasions dated as 14,308 ± 177 BP and 14,202 ± 173 BP showed a similar composition to non-tephra samples from three nunataks of Thordarhyrna.

Jökulhlaups could occur on either the Skeiðarársandur outwash plain or affecting the Djúpá, Hverfisfljót, or Skaftá rivers.

== Geology ==
There is both a mechanical interaction encouraging dyke propagation between Thordarhyrna, a stratovolcano, and Grímsvötn, despite these volcanoes being relatively far apart, and a close chemical affinity in their lavas. Both volcanoes are part of the Eastern volcanic zone of Iceland, are over the Iceland mantle plume, and are related to two associated parallel fissure systems with crater rows extending to the south east; the 25 km (16 mi) long Laki–Grímsvötn fissure system and the 30 km (19 mi) long Rauðhólar-Eldgígur fissure system. The 1783 Laki fissure eruption crater row is the location of the most significant effusive eruption in the last 1000 years in Iceland.

A fault runs (N 35° W) from Thordarhyrna towards Hamarinn, and separates two different tectonic regions. The southern topography has north-east to south-west long linear hyaloclastic ridges, while to the north-east, there are the central volcanoes of Hamarinn, Bárðarbunga, and Grímsvötn. These last are tectonically at the north-east corner of the Hreppar microplate.

Mostly samples from the Thordarhyrna central volcano are tholeiitic basalt. However samples from the nunataks poking through the ice have yielded basaltic andesite, dacite or rhyolite specimens consistent with more mature lavas.

Near Pálsfjall in the north-west part of the central volcano, there is a small geothermal area.

== See also ==
- Volcanism of Iceland
  - List of volcanic eruptions in Iceland
  - List of volcanoes in Iceland
