= Vatnaöldur =

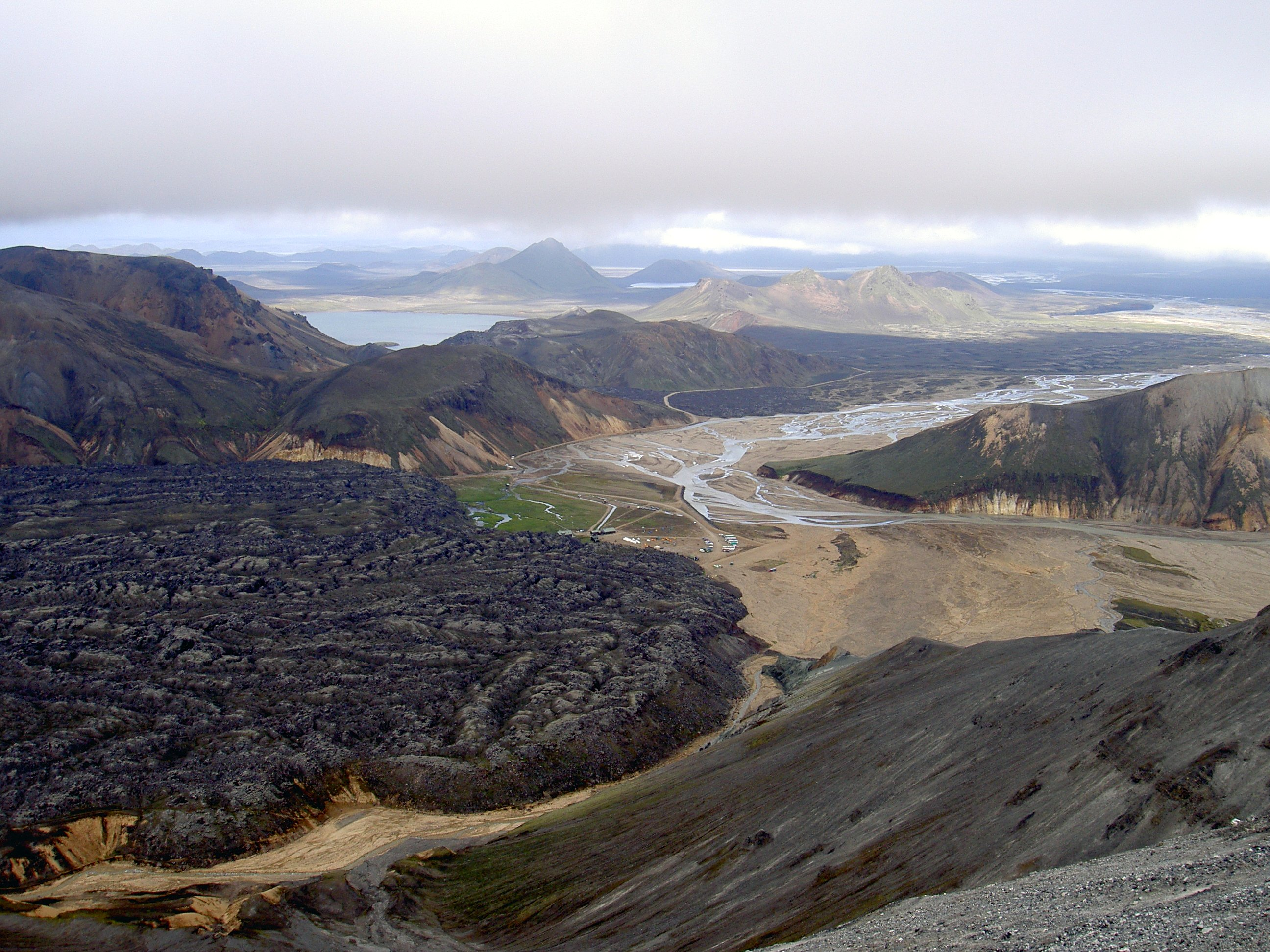
- Vatnaöldur fissure associated features are in the far distance over the river in this picture from Bláhnúkur towards the north-east
- Volcano: Bárðarbunga
- Date: 877 ± 2
- Type: Fissure vents
- Location: 64°10′52″N 18°45′09″W
- VEI: 4

Maps
- Selected geological features near Vatnaöldur (red marker). Legend: Other shading shows: calderas; central volcanoes; fissure swarms; subglacial terrain above 1,100 m (3,600 ft); seismically active areas; Clicking on the rectangle in the image enlarges to full window and enables mouse-over with more detail.

Vatnaöldur (Icelandic pronunciation: [ˈvahtnaˌœltʏr̥]) is the name of a series of craters in the Suðurland region of Iceland. They are located in the Highlands of Iceland, north–west of the Veiðivötn and north–east of Landmannalaugar, within the municipality of Rangárþing ytra. It is part of the Eastern volcanic zone (EVZ).

The craters were formed during a series of eruptions associated with a basaltic dyke intrusion from the volcanic system of Bárðarbunga around the year 877. (Note: Timings published before 2017 in the literature for the Settlement tephra layer need adjustment. The Greenland ice core studies now date this as 877, while previous to 2017 this was dated as 871. Timings were adjusted after the Icelandic tree ring series was extended to 822.) These eruptions, like those of the neighbouring Veiðivötn, were from about 65 kilometres (40 mi) (or 42 kilometres (26 mi)) long volcanic fissures within the area of a lake. The mainly explosive eruptions emitted 5–10 km^{3} (1.2–2.4 cu mi) of tholeiite basalt. There were rhyolite and transitional-alkali basalt eruptions within Torfajökull that are thought to have been triggered by the intrusion associated with Vatnaöldur. The associated tephra layer is called the Settlement layer, and covers more than half of Iceland’s land surface.

== See also ==
- List of volcanic eruptions in Iceland
- Volcanism of Iceland
- Geology of Iceland
- List of volcanoes in Iceland
- Geological deformation of Iceland

== Sources ==
- G. Larsen, Thor Thordarson: Phreatomagmatism in the Eastern Volcanic Zone; Retrieved July 25, 2010
- Commentary by volcanologist Haraldur Sigurðsson on Bárðarbunga and Vatnaöldur eruptions (Icelandic)
- Vatnaöldur. The Global Volcanism Program of the Smithsonian Institution
- Vulkanology by Haraldur Sigurðsson on Bárðarbunga and Vatnaöldur Eruptions (Isländish)
- Faculty of Earth Sciences - University of Iceland 2013. Gravity studies of the structure of the Vatnaöldur and Veiðivötn crater rows, South Central Iceland. Jeanne M. Giniaux
