= 1996 eruption of Gjálp =

Volcanic eruption in Iceland

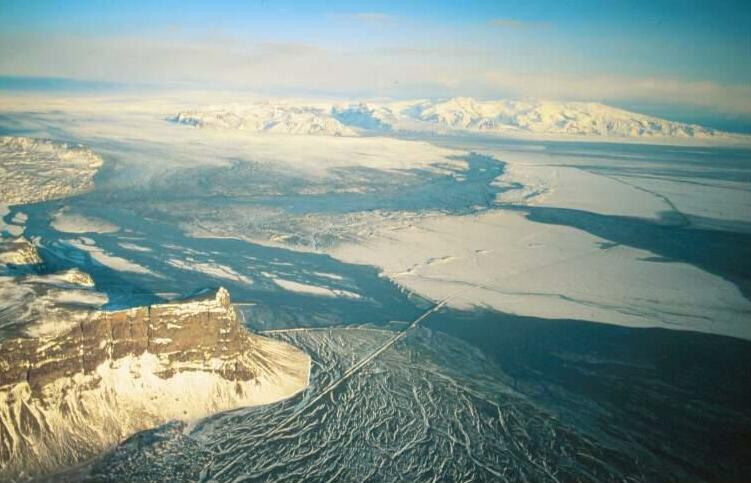
- Gjálp eruption: Jökulhlaup 1996 over Skeiðarársandur, the piedmont glacier Skeiðarárjökull and Öræfajökull in the background
- Volcano: Gjálp
- Start date: 30 September 1996
- End date: 13 October 1996
- Type: Subglacial fissure eruption
- Location: Western Vatnajökull; 64°32′00″N 17°25′00″W
- VEI: 3
- Impact: Jökulhlaup over Skeiðarársandur, Hringvegur partially destroyed

Maps
- Geological map of subglacial Gjálp ridge (violet outline). Shading shows: subglacial terrain above 1,100 m (3,600 ft), seismically active areas between 1995 and 2007, calderas, central volcanoes and fissure swarms. Clicking on the image enables fll window and mouse-over with more detail.

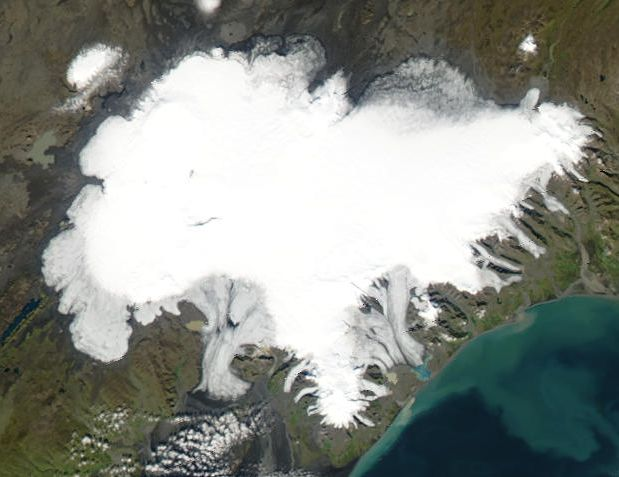
Vatnajökull: In the western part to be seen are the Grímsvötn caldera (dark half-moon indentation), to the north of it Gjálp, and to the north of Gjálp the completely subglacial caldera of Bárðarbunga

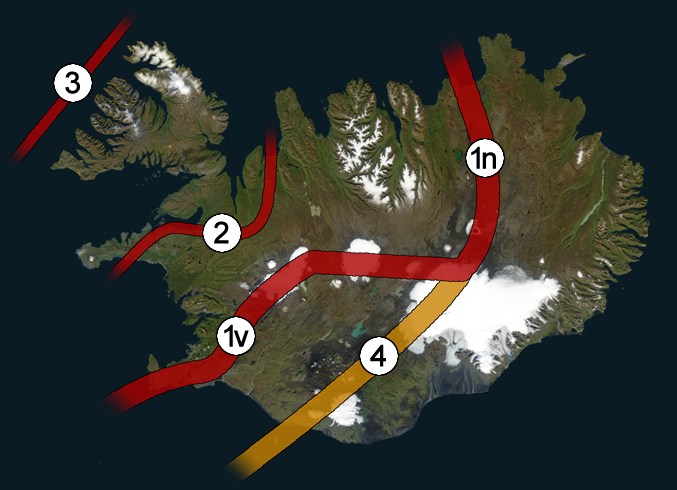
Icelandic rift zones and Vatnajökull: East Volcanic Zone (no. 4) crossing its western part

Between 30 September and 13 October 1996, an Icelandic hyaloclastite ridge named Gjálp (Icelandic pronunciation: [ˈcaul̥p]) erupted. Located under the Vatnajökull glacier shield, its present form resulted from the eruptions, and it is likely part of the Grímsvötn volcanic system. However, not all scientists are of this opinion, as seismic studies are consistent with a 10 km (6.2 mi) lateral dike intrusion at about 5 km (3.1 mi) depth from Bárðarbunga being the trigger event. This does not exclude a shallower secondary intrusion from Grímsvötn being important in the subaerial eruption itself. (Note: Despite the extensive study the precise sequence of events during the eruption has not been conclusively determined as well as assignment to volcanic system. Several authorities have speculated on the following sequence of events given evolving volcanology theory in the last decade: 1. Deep basaltic primary intrusion from Bárðarbunga system on 29 September 1996; 2. This intercepted a maturing Grímsvötn magma pocket (that may have had some active Grímsvötn basalt magma input at the time); 3. Which was triggered into eruption 30 September 1996 onwards; Another alternative explanation for the observations could be: 1. Tectonic interaction along a fault that propagated from Bárðarbunga towards Grímsvötn; 2. This intercepted an almost primed maturing Grímsvötn magma pocket (that may have had some active Grímsvötn basalt magma input at the time); 3. Which was triggered into eruption 30 September 1996 onwards; Less consistent with the compositional studies evidence: 1. Subglacial eruption at north western part of Bárðarbunga Caldera on 29 September 1996; 2. Deep basaltic Bárðarbunga intrusion on far side of Bárðarbunga system into maturing shallower magma pocket shared with Grímsvötn system; 3. Which was triggered into eruption 30 September 1996 onwards; Inconsistent with current compositional and seismic evidence base: 1. Maturing shallow magma pocket in either Bárðarbunga volcanic system or its Loki-Fögrufjöll subsystem (best location data on 192 peri-eruption seismic events with good location solutions only assigned two to Loki Ridge, but perhaps there is a magma pocket under the Loki Ridge); 2. Bárðarbunga Caldera priming event 29 September 1996; 3. Bárðarbunga volcanic system triggered into subaerial eruption 30 September 1996 onwards)

== Importance ==
The eruption was of importance, because it was for the first time that a subglacial eruption under a thick ice cover as well as the connected jökulhlaup could be observed and analyzed by modern techniques.

== Geography ==
=== Eruption location ===
The subglacial eruption fissure is to be found in the northwest corner of Vatnajökull ice cap more or less halfway between the central volcanoes Bárðarbunga and Grímsvötn. It is also to the west of the Hamarinn central volcano of the Bárðarbunga volcanic system which has the Loki Ridge extending west–east which has been assigned historically to the Loki-Fögrufjöll volcano.

=== Vatnajökull ice cap ===
The Vatnajökull glacier which covered the location at time of eruption had a thickness of 500–600 m (1,600–2,000 ft). In other places the glacier shield can have thicknesses of up to 900 m (3,000 ft). Vatnajökull covered an area of 8.2 km^{2} (3.2 sq mi) in 1996, but it is retreating and measured just 8.1 km^{2} (3.1 sq mi) in 2007. The glacier is temperate, lies in lower elevations and is therefore sensible to climatic changes. As a consequence it has been advancing and retreating since the Weichselian glaciation. Its last advance took place during the so-called Little Ice Age from the 13th to the end of the 19th century and since then it is retreating.

Parts of two volcanic zones of Iceland are placed under Vatnajökull, i.e. the very active East Volcanic Zone (connected to rifting at the divergent plate boundary in Iceland), responsible for the highest number of eruptions after deglaciation and with the mantle plume probably under Bárðarbunga, i.e. under Vatnajökull. "More than 80 eruptions occurred during the last 800 years in Vatnajökull." There is also the much less active Öraefi Volcanic Belt, a flank zone mostly under the eastern part of Vatnajökull. It is thought that due to climate change, Vatnajökull has lost about 10% of its mass since the end of the 19th century. Measurements showed an accentuated and even accelerating rate of glacio-isostatic uplift. This could lead to increased magma production (so called decompression melt production), because the "pot lid" formed by the glaciers and their weight will be absent in the future, and eruption frequency could increase as a consequence.

The region of the Gjálp fissures is part of this active East Volcanic Zone under Vatnajökull.

== Geology ==
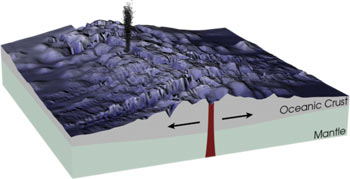
This kind of eruption, but under a glacier shield

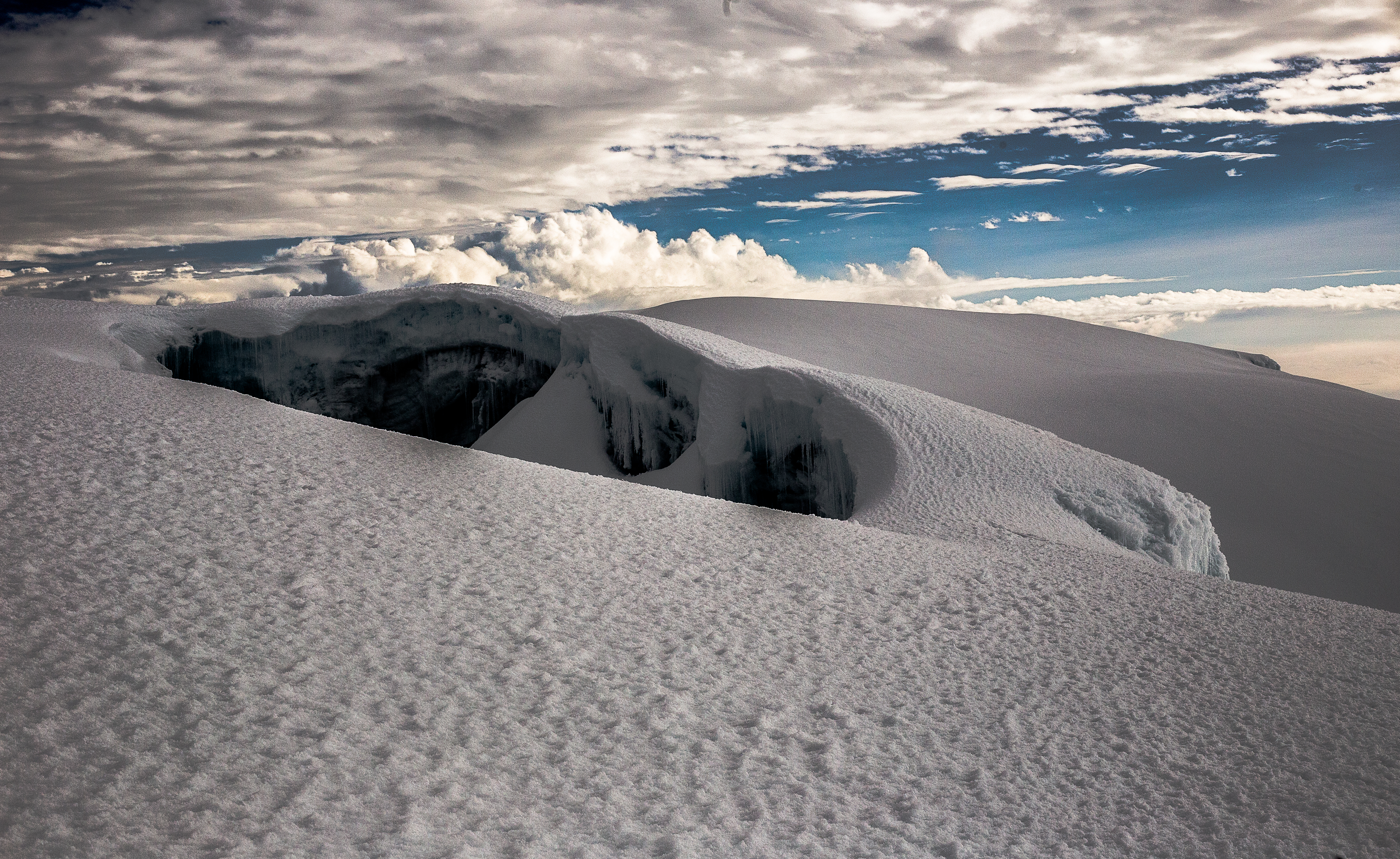
Ice cauldrons merging to form an ice canyon at the glacier covered Colombian volcano Nevado del Tolima

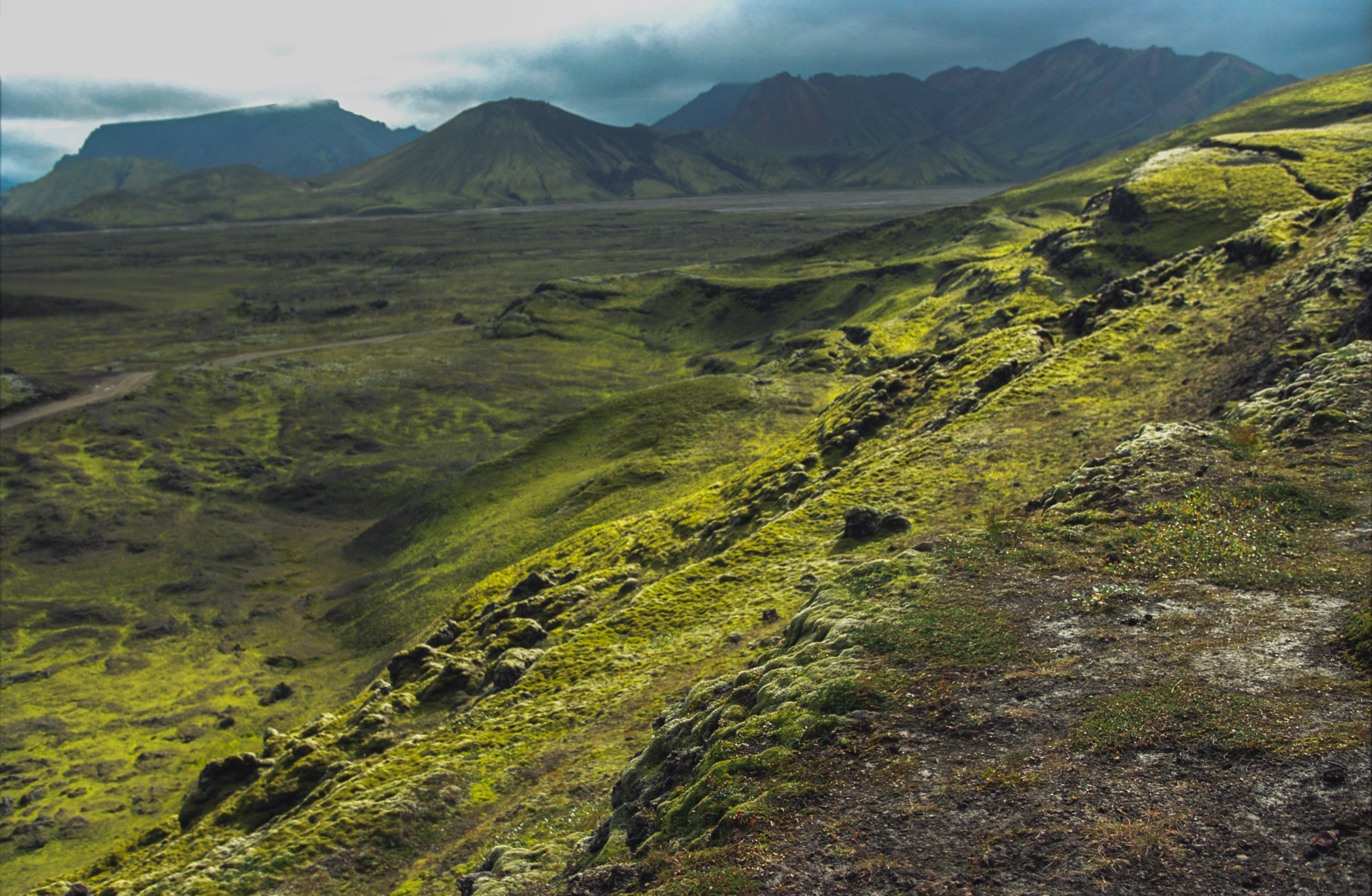
Similar built hyaloclastite ridges (tindars) of the Bárðarbunga-Veiðivötn volcanic system not far from Landmannalaugar

The Gjálp eruption formed in about two weeks a subglacial hyaloclastite ridge, also called tindar by some geologists, in a zone of known former eruptions. Predominantly basaltic andesite was erupted to a volume of 0.45 km^{3} (0.11 cu mi) DRE.

=== The eruption in 1996 ===
==== Precursors and possible connection between volcanic systems ====
Some large earthquakes (M5+) had taken place in the central volcano Bárðarbunga just before the eruption and proved to be precursors of the eruptive events. In particular a M_{w} 5.6 event took place on 29 September in the northern part of the Bárðarbunga caldera and its aftershock sequence propagated over the next two days in a linear fashion towards Grímsvötn. It is possible that the first large event was associated with a subglacial eruption within the Bárðarbunga caldera a couple of days before the Gjálp eruption. The seismological study sees a parallel to the 2014–2015 eruptions and to the caldera drop in Bárðarbunga central volcano in that eruption, and postulate a similar magma migration to the eruption site though on a smaller scale. This could mean that the volcano is part of the fissure system of Bárðarbunga, not Grímsvötn. There had been seismic studies that suggested an east west line of seismic activity in the Bárðarbunga volcanic system at the Loki Ridge intersected the eruption location, but the Loki Ridge was not seismically active during the eruption.

Another possibility is that Bárðarbunga magma entered a portion the magmatic system of Grímsvötn and started the eruption by this intrusion. Bárðarbunga is known for such tendencies, as its magma mingled with Torfajökull magma at least three times in the past which resulted in bimodal eruptions, e.g. of the Veiðivötn and at Landmannalaugar by the end of the 15th century.

==== Formation of the tindar volcano ====
The Gjálp eruption took place at a some kilometers long known fissure under 550–700 m (1,800–2,300 ft) of glacier ice within Vatnajökull. The eruption in October 1996 could push through this ice in about 30 hours and took place from 30 September to 13 October 1996. The eruption fissure had a length of 6–7 km (3.7–4.3 mi).

The location is some kilometers to the north of Grímsvötn caldera.

In the beginning, a 2–4 km (1.2–2.5 mi) long N–S trending depression was formed above the fissure, with time three ice cauldrons were built at each end and in the middle, but the eruption concentrated later on one of them where a 200–300 m (660–980 ft) wide crater came to light. After some time, an open ice canyon was built above the fissure. It had a length of about 3.5 km (2.2 mi) and was up to 500 m (1,600 ft) in width.

The meltwater drained first through the ice canyon and then disappeared into subglacial channels and run from there to the subglacial caldera lake of Grímsvötn. The subglacial channels were easily recognized, because continuous melting caused by the hot water from the eruption site initiated the formation of depressions on the ice surface. And so the scientists followed the melting path down to Grímsvötn caldera.

Though the eruption was mostly explosive, the ash was not expelled far from the vents, but fell back into the canyon. The quantity of eruption products stayed more or less the same the whole time which was explained by ice flow into the crater.

During the two weeks of eruption, volcanic activity thawed no less than 3 km^{3} (0.72 cu mi) of ice, and this continued to a lesser extent for some time after the end of the eruption.

The newly formed tindar disappeared again completely under the glacier ice about 1 year later, but an identifiable ice cauldron remained until at least 2007. The tindar was a 6 km (3.7 mi) long ridge newly deposited to a height of 500 m (1,600 ft) above the pre-existing bedrock with a volume of 0.7 km^{3} (0.17 cu mi). It is postulated that the original unconsolidated hyaloclastitic volcanic glass and tephra of the ridge could have by now undergone a process called palagonitization due to hydrothermal alteration, to palagonite, a consolidated rock more resistant to erosion, but it is unknown if this has happened.

==== Eruption products ====
The eruptive products consisted of predominantly basaltic andesite which surprised the scientists as these more evolved rocks are neither typical for Bárðarbunga nor for Grímsvötn, both more connected to basaltic volcanism. Some scientists thought therefore that Gjálp could be an independent volcano. The bulk samples obtained shortly after the eruption ranged from basaltic andesite to basalt and were of distinctive Grímsvötn composition. Basaltic andesite from a 1887 eruption had been previously attributed to the Grímsvötn volcanic system and had very similar composition. Tephra assigned to the eruption has been analysed by several researchers and has composition that is Grímsvötn basaltic andesite with rarely Grímsvötn basalt. A total of three samples out of the several hundred in the literature had some tephra with Bárðarbunga basalt composition. It is unknown if this was due to contamination from pre-existing tephra layers in the ice that was overlying Gjálp or if the Bárðarbunga basalt was erupted together with the Grímsvötn basaltic andesite.

=== Jökulhlaup in 1996 ===
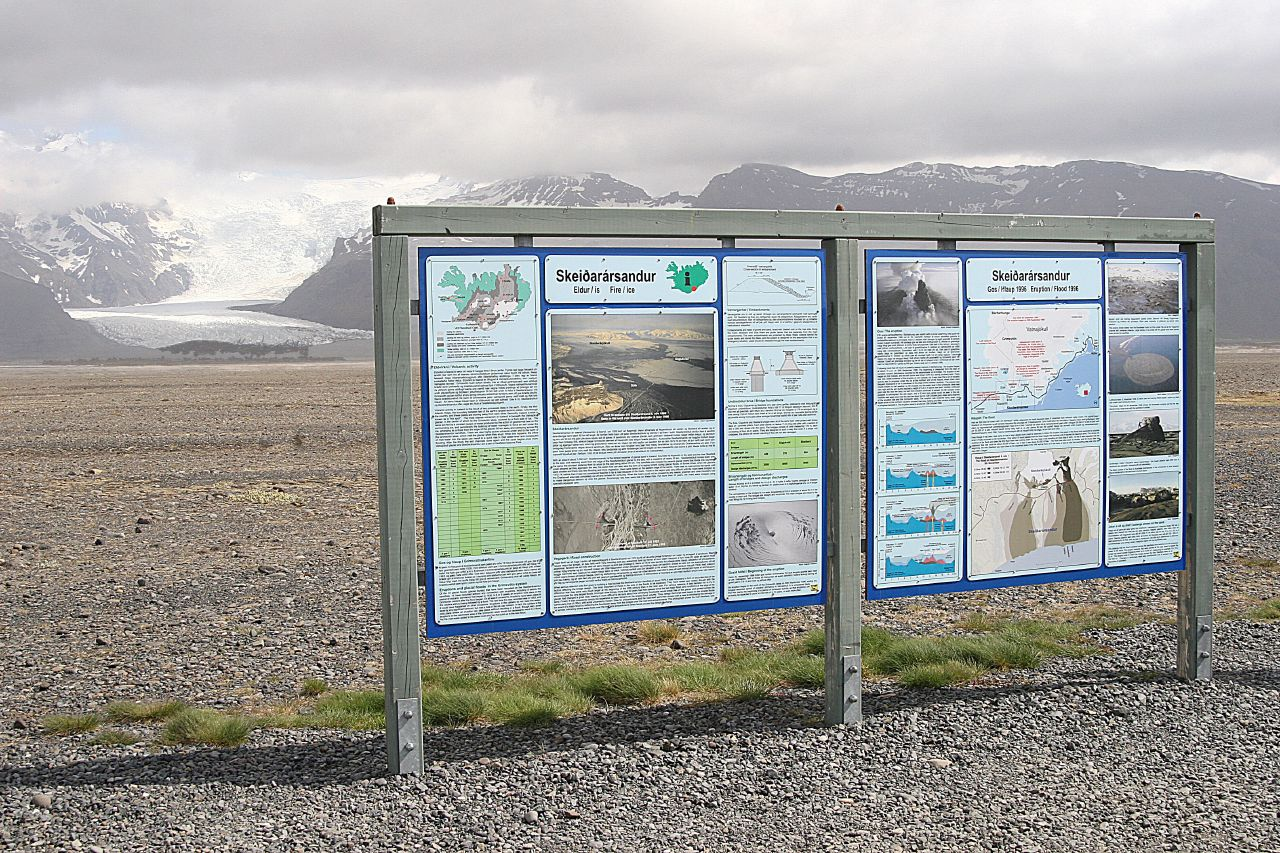
Memorial of the jökulhlaup on Skeiðarársandur, outlet glacier Svínafellsjökull in the background

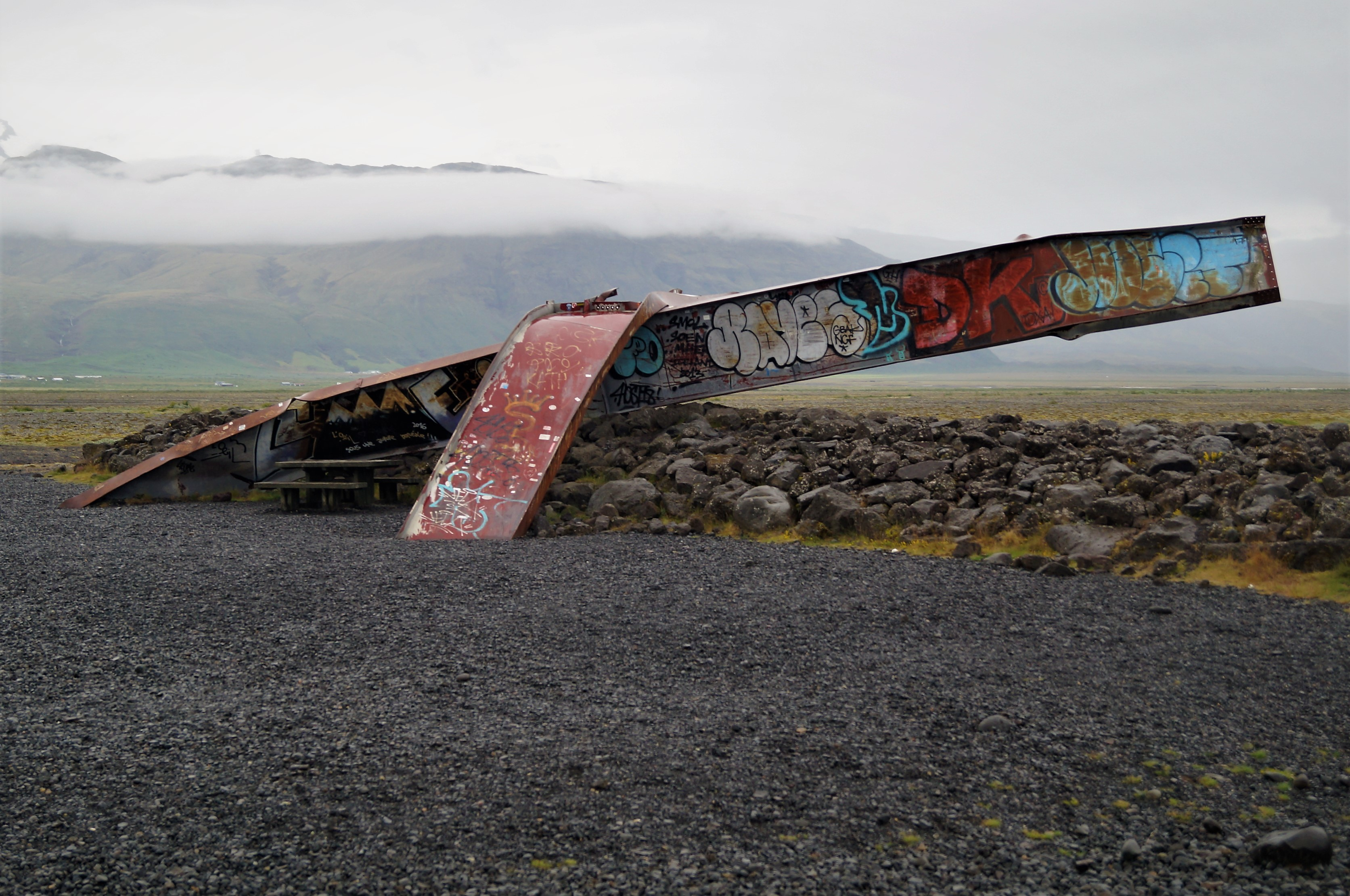
Parts of the destroyed bridge over Gígjukvísl river on Skeiðarársandur

In the beginning, scientists presumed that the eruption would be followed immediately by a big jökulhlaup (a sort of a meltwater tsunami including large blocks of ice and a high quantity of sediment). But it took some time to fill the subglacial lake of Grímsvötn in such a manner that the ice wall holding it back would break.

Not before some weeks had passed after the eruption was terminated, did the expected jökulhlaup happen. This was from 4 to 7 November 1996. The melt water streamed mostly in subglacial channels and in the end under the outlet glacier Skeiðarárjökull. There, to everybody's surprise, the water masses streamed in such a quantity that the whole glacier was lifted up.

In the end, the water sprang up from under the glacier edge and the flood covered most of Skeiðarársandur glacial outwash plain, destroying on its way large parts of the main road Hringvegur including two bridges and some communication installations. Luckily, the road had been closed before the flood so that nobody was injured.

The volume of melt water produced by this eruption was around 4 km^{3} (0.96 cu mi). Water flowing over the sandur streamed at up to 50–60,000 m^{3}/s (1,800–2,118,900 cu ft/s). The first estimates had been somewhat lower.

=== Former eruption in 1938 ===
At more or less the same place another eruption had taken place in the 1930s. It had also caused a jökulhlaup, but at the time, science could not yet analyse the events. That eruption stayed subglacial.

== See also ==
- List of volcanic eruptions in Iceland
- Subglacial volcano
- Grímsvötn
- Subglacial eruption
- Bárðarbunga
- Ice cauldron
