= Trölladyngja =

Volcano in Iceland

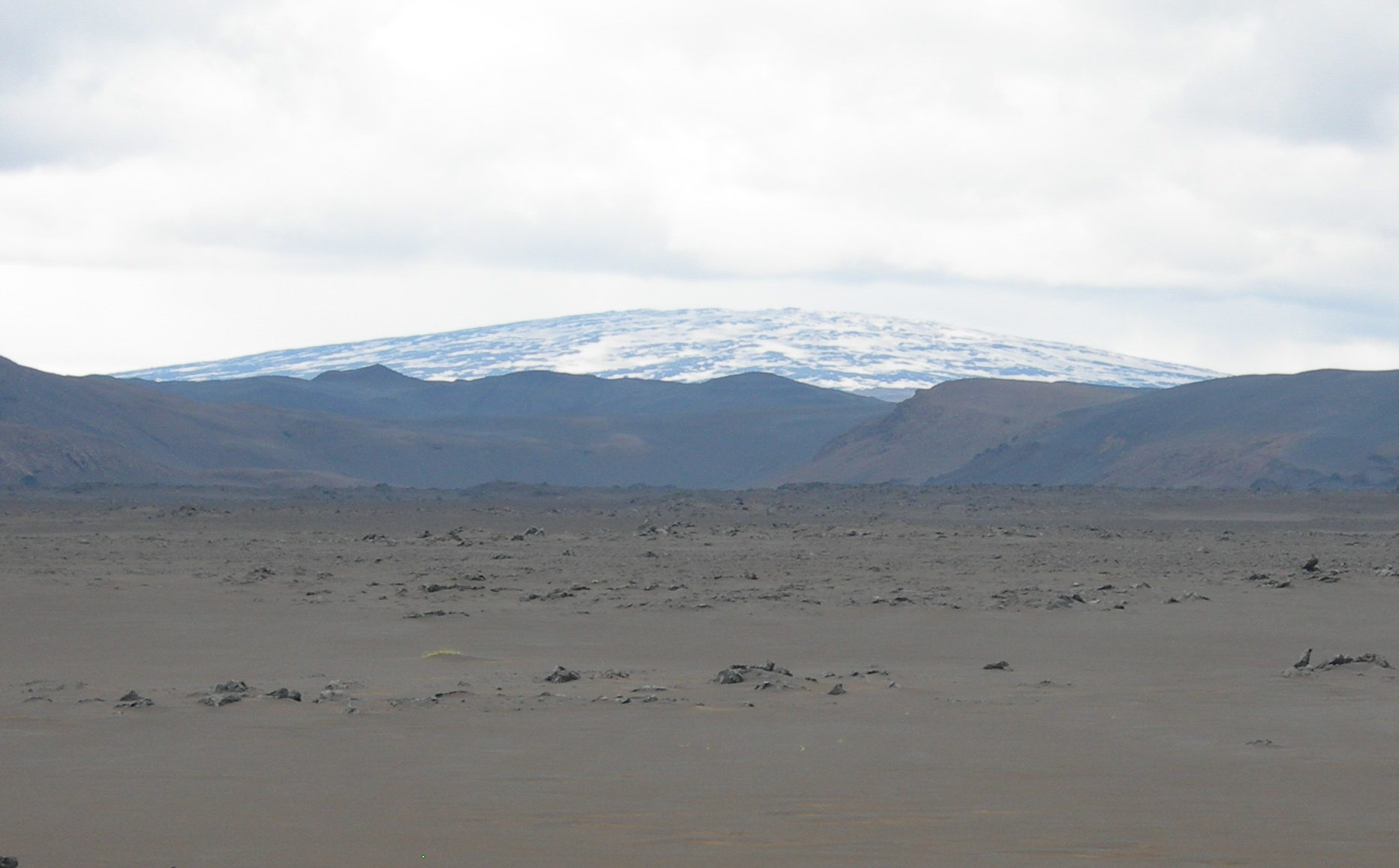

Highest point
- Elevation: 1,460 m (4,790 ft)
- Coordinates: 64°53′35″N 17°15′17″W

Geography
- Location within Iceland
- Location: Iceland
- Topo map: Geological features near the Trölladyngja shield volcano (red outline). Its definite lava flow extent is a deep shade of purple, while other Bárðarbunga associated lava flows are light purple. Shading also shows: subglacial terrain above 1,100 m (3,600 ft), seismically active areas between 1995 and 2007, calderas, other central volcanoes and fissure swarms. Clicking on the image enables mouse-over with more detail.

Geology
- Mountain type: shield volcano
- Last eruption: less than 4,500 years ago

Situated in the Ódáðahraun lava field, Trölladyngja (Icelandic pronunciation: [ˈtʰrœtlaˌtiɲca]) is the biggest of the Icelandic shield volcanoes, reaching a height of 1,460 metres (4,790 ft) above sea level, and rising almost 600 m (2,000 ft) above the surrounding desert and lava fields. It part of the Bárðarbunga volcanic system and has a volume of 15 km^{3} (3.6 cu mi) with some extensive lava flows to the north of Bárðarbunga.

It is about 10 km (6.2 mi)in diameter and its inclination is 4 to 5° in the lower slopes, but 6 to 8° at higher elevations. Its oblong crater is about 1,200 to 1,500 m (3,900 to 4,900 ft) in length, 500 m (1,600 ft) broad, and about 100 m (330 ft) deep.

Most of its tholeiitic basalt lava fields have flowed in a northerly direction, and the definite lava field has been dated at less than 4500 years old. Composition studies allow the separation of Trölladyngja lavas with their Bárðarbunga associations from other nearby older and younger Bárðarbunga basaltic lavas. This includes a Bárðarbunga volcanic system origin lava field branch, that possibly erupted from the fissure swarm south of Trölladyngja before 8000 years ago, that reached the valley of Bárðardalur, a distance of roughly 100 km (62 mi) and quite close to the northern Iceland sea coast. The shield volcano itself is situated north of latitude 64.7° where the strike direction of the fissure swarms formed in the last 10 million years and the 2014 dyke intrusion from Bárðarbunga towards the north have the orientation of the Northern volcanic zone. The Bárðarbunga central volcano to the south is definitely in the Eastern volcanic zone.

Reports of an eruption in 1961 at Trölladyngja are most likely attributed to nearby Askja Caldera, which erupted the same year. A potential confusion also exists geographically as in the distant past the name Trölladyngja had been used by some when writing about the Askja (Dynjufjöll, Dyngjufjall) volcanic system The volcano can now be definitely assigned to the Bárðarbunga volcanic system. The volcano and its lava flows overlay older lava that is about 8000 years old.

== See also ==
- Volcanism of Iceland
  - List of volcanic eruptions in Iceland
  - List of volcanoes in Iceland
