= Vatnafjöll =

- Location within Iceland

Highest point
- Elevation: 1,235 m (4,052 ft)
- Coordinates: 63°55′12″N 19°40′12″W

Geography
- Location: Iceland

Geology
- Rock age: Tephrochronology
- Mountain type: Fissure vents of Hekla
- Last eruption: 1200 years ago

Vatnafjöll (Icelandic pronunciation: [ˈvahtnaˌfjœtl̥]) is a 40 km (25 mi) long, 9 km (6 mi) wide basaltic fissure vent system that is south-east of Hekla, Iceland. It includes from the north towards the south the hills of Innri-Vatnafjöll at 1,089 m (3,573 ft) high, Fremri-Vatnafjöll at 901 m (2,956 ft) and Vatnafjallarani at 574 m (1,883 ft) as the main Vatnafjöll edifice, at a distance of about 7 km (4.3 mi) from Hekla. It is part of the same system as Hekla, and the term Hekla-Vatnafjöll volcanic system has been used to describe it. More than two dozen eruptions have occurred at Vatnafjöll during the Holocene Epoch. Vatnafjöll has not erupted during the last 1100 years. While these eruptions were predominantly effusive some basaltic tephra deposits have been found up to 40–50 km (25–31 mi) away.

A M_{w} 5.9 with an epicenter near the main Vatnafjöll edifice occurred on 25th May, 1987, where the transform South Iceland seismic zone meets the East volcanic zone of Iceland. Later analysis has suggested that initiation was from strain relief but a subsurface dyke intrusion then occurred over the next 3 days.

== See also ==
- Volcanism of Iceland
  - List of volcanic eruptions in Iceland
  - List of volcanoes in Iceland
