= Geitlandsjökull =

Outlet glacier and tuya in Iceland

- Vatnajökull
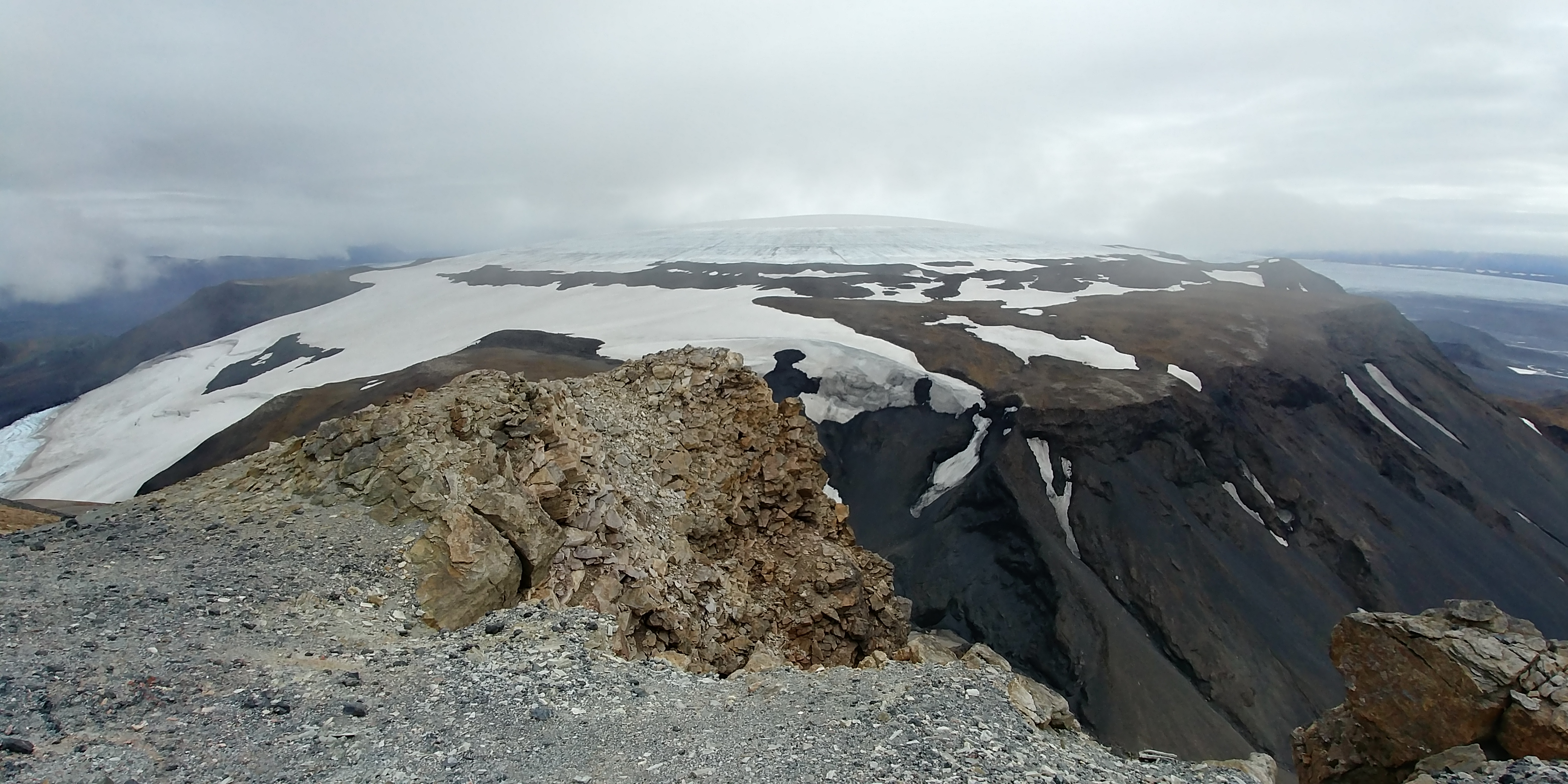
- Geitlandsjökull as seen from adjacent Prestahnúkur to the east.
- Map of Langjökull ice cap showing its named glacial catchments (light grey shading with white outline). The Geitlandsjökull catchment is outlined in turquoise. Clicking on the map to enlarge it enables mouse over that allows identification of individual named glacial catchments.
- Type: Outlet glacier
- Location: Iceland
- Coordinates: 64°36′00″N 20°36′00″W
- Area: 13 km^{2} (5.0 sq mi)
- Highest elevation: 1,400 m (4,600 ft)
- Status: stable

Geitlandsjökull
- Location within Iceland

Highest point
- Elevation: 1,400 m (4,600 ft)
- Coordinates: 64°36′00″N 20°36′00″W

Geography
- Location: Iceland

Geology
- Mountain type: Tuya

Geitlandsjökull (Icelandic pronunciation: [ˈceitˌlan(t)sˌjœːkʏtl̥]) is a lateral glacier of Langjökull, with a flowshed of 13 km^{2} (5.0 sq mi) from the second largest ice cap in Iceland at 904 km^{2} (349 sq mi), in the west of Iceland. It has also been used as the name for the substantial Langjökull ice cap, as has the name Suðurjöklar. The highest point of Geitlandsjökull, which lies on top of a tuya, reaches a height of 1,400 m (4,600 ft).

Unlike most of the outlet glaciers of Langjökull which are retreating, its recent mass balance is stable, as it intercepts the predominant low pressure weather systems from the south-west.

In the Grettis saga, the outlaw Grettir Ásmundarson climbed Geitlandsjökull and walked south from it to a grassy valley with hot springs and surrounded by glaciers on all sides.
