= Þjórsá Lava =

Lava flow in Iceland

Coordinates: 63°54′N 21°06′W

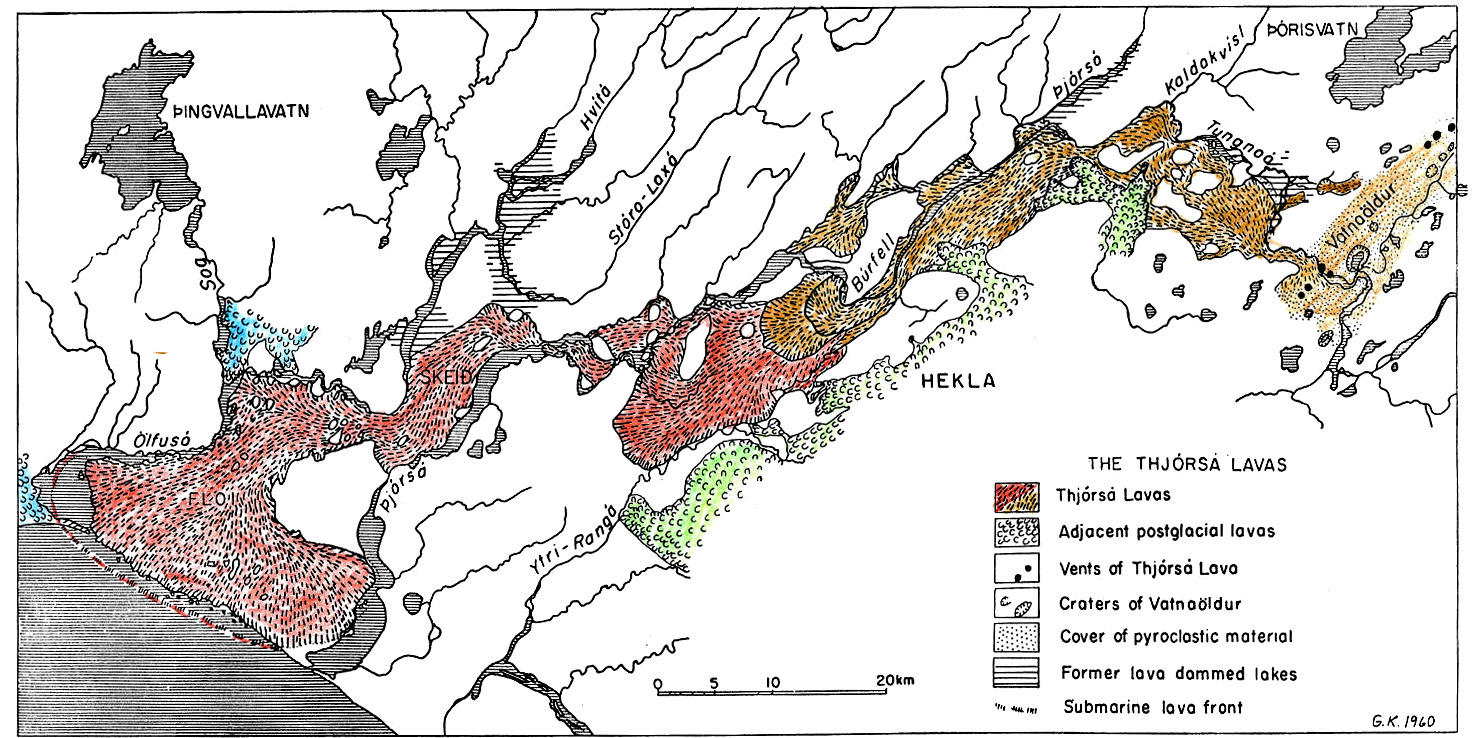
The great Þjórsá lava field is shown here in red where it can be seen on the surface. In the Veiðivatn area it is covered by younger lava (Map by Guðmundur Kjartansson, geologist)

Selected geological features near the Þjórsá Lava (surface flow extent is a deep shade of purple). Other Bárðarbunga associated lava flows including the younger Tungnaá lavas are light violet. Shading also shows: calderas, central volcanoes and fissure swarms, subglacial terrain above 1,100 m (3,600 ft), seismically active areas between 1995 and 2007. Clicking on the image enables mouse-over with more detail.

The Great Þjórsá Lava (Icelandic: Þjórsárhraunið mikla [ˈθjour̥sˌaur̥ˌr̥œyːnɪð ˈmɪhkla]) is the largest lava flow in Iceland (by both area and volume) and the largest lava flow that is known to have erupted in a single eruption in the Holocene. Þjórsá Lava has a total volume of more than 25 km^{3} (6.0 cu mi), covering approximately 900 km^{2} (350 sq mi). The Þjórsá Lava does not appear on the surface until 70 km (43 mi) downstream of its identified eruptive area.

== Geography ==
In the lowlands of South Iceland the lava has overflown wide areas, covering the districts Landsveit, Gnúpverjahreppur, Skeið and Flói. The main rivers of South Iceland, Þjórsá and Hvítá/Ölfusá, stream along the borders of the lava to the east and west and the 25 km (16 mi) long beach between the river mouths is formed by the lava. The sea level seems to have been around 15 m (49 ft) lower than today when the lava was erupted. Along with the rising sea level the ocean has transgressed the lava front so its border line is submerged several hundreds of metres off-shore and its littoral zone can be inspected along the beach.

The towns of Selfoss, Eyrarbakki and Stokkseyri are built on the lava.

== Geology ==
The Þjórsá Lava was erupted in the Veiðivötn (Thjorsarhraun) region, Central Iceland, 8600 years BP (6650 BCE ± 50 BC). It belongs to a group of lavas known as the Tungnaá lavas and is mostly covered by younger members of them. The crater area itself is also covered by younger lavas and eruptives. One calculation of its area is around 970 km^{2} (370 sq mi), the thickness 26 m (85 ft) and volume therefore close to 26 km^{3} (6.2 cu mi). The Þjórsá lava is plagioclase-porphyritic, with large light coloured feldspar phenocrysts sitting in a dark, fine grained ground mass. The plagioclase and the host lava are unrelated and developed from two distinct mantle origins, with the feldspar plagioclase xenocrysts coming from a magma chamber at least 9 km (5.6 mi) deep. The host lava is tholeiitic basalt. Composition is within the range of values observed for the lavas of the Bárðarbunga volcanic system.

== Approach ==
The littoral part of the Great Þjórsá Lava can be inspected off the seawalls of Stokkseyri and Eyrarbakki. During low tide the Atlantic waves break at the submerged lava front far off-shore but closer to the beach small channels in between flat lava skerries, grown with seaweed, indicate the landscape.
