= Loki-Fögrufjöll =

Volcano in Iceland

- Hamarinn
- Location within Iceland
- Selected geological features near the Loki-Fögrufjöll (Hamarinn) central volcano and Bárðarbunga volcanic system (red outlines). Legend: Other shading shows: calderas; central volcanoes; fissure swarms; subglacial terrain above 1,100 m (3,600 ft); seismically active areas; Clicking on the rectangle in the image enlarges to full window and enables mouse-over with more detail.

Highest point
- Elevation: 1,573 m (5,161 ft)
- Listing: List of volcanoes in Iceland
- Coordinates: 64°28′41″N 17°49′18″W

Geology
- Mountain type: Subglacial volcano
- Last eruption: 1910

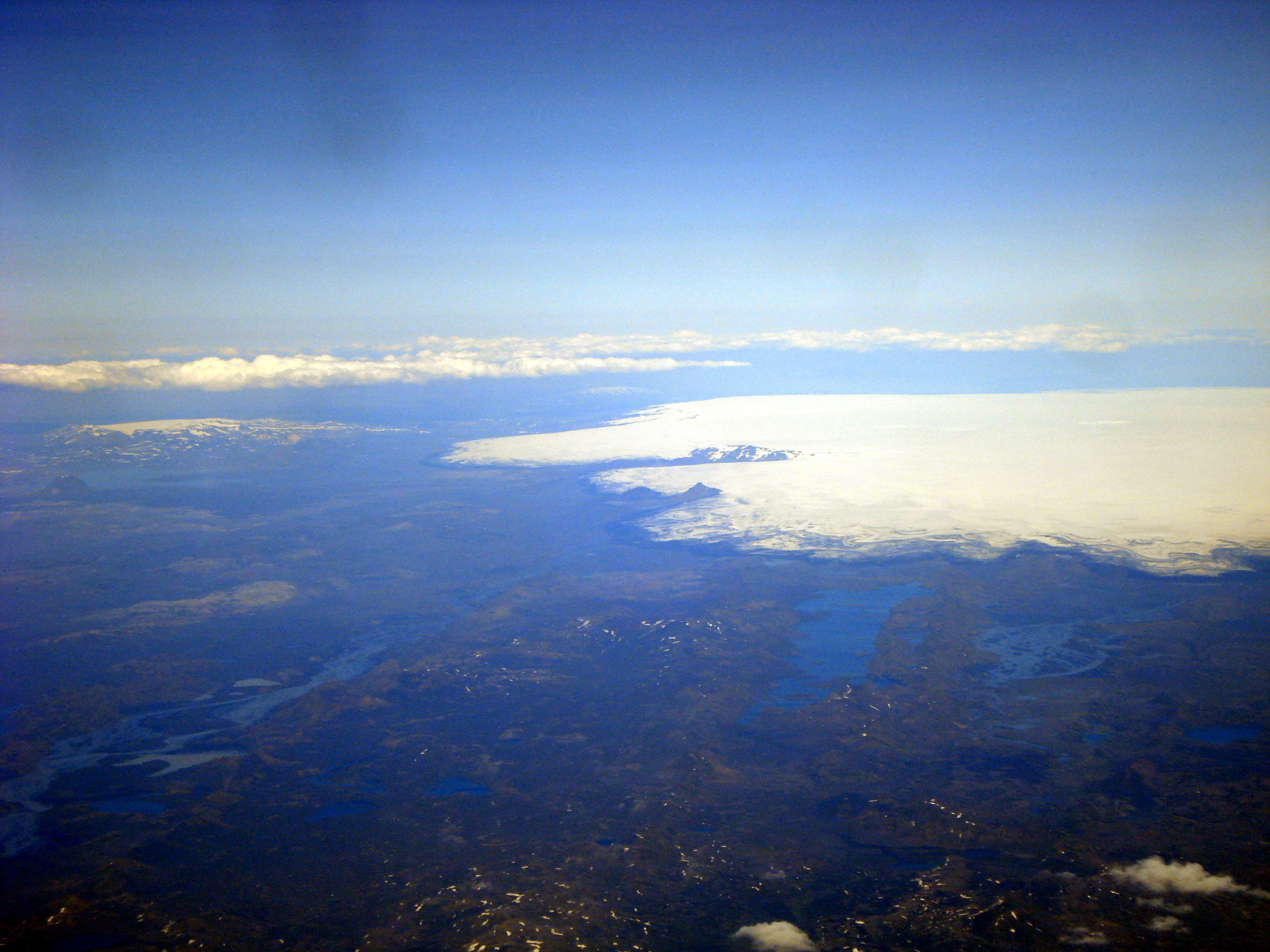
Hamarinn and Hamarskriki in front of Vatnajökull

The Loki-Fögrufjöll (Icelandic pronunciation: [ˈlɔːcɪ-ˈfœɣrʏˌfjœtl̥] volcanic system; also known as Hamarinn [ˈhaːmarɪn] after its central volcano or Lokahryggur [ˈlɔːkaˌr̥ɪkːʏr̥]) is a subglacial volcano under the Vatnajökull glacier.

The subglacial volcano is found within the Bárðarbunga fissure volcanic system, but is outside the caldera of Bárðarbunga itself. Earthquake swarms associated with the volcano are separate in time and place from other swarms in the Bárðarbunga system. The fissure swarm extending south-west towards Torfajökull has not had recent earthquakes or erupted in the Holocene. A geothermally and seismically active ridge called Lokahryggur or the Loki Ridge, extends eastward from Hamarinn under the ice to where in 1996 the Gjálp volcanic fissure erupted between Bárðarbunga and Grímsvötn and produced a large jökulhlaup. (Note: This eruption is usually assigned to the Grímsvötn system. Seismic studies under the ice cover suggest the eruption was at intersection of three areas of recent seismic activity; Lokahryggur, Bárðarbunga and Grímsvötn. There was at the time of the 1996 eruption minimal seismic activity in the Lokahryggur region.)

The last confirmed eruption was in 1910 when tephra was erupted, but the system may also have had subglacial eruptions in 1986, 1991, 2006, 2008 and 2011.

== See also ==
- Volcanism of Iceland
  - List of volcanic eruptions in Iceland
  - List of volcanoes in Iceland
