= Sólheimajökull =

Glacier in southern Iceland, between the volcanoes Katla and Eyjafjallajökull

Coordinates: 63°33′N 19°18′W

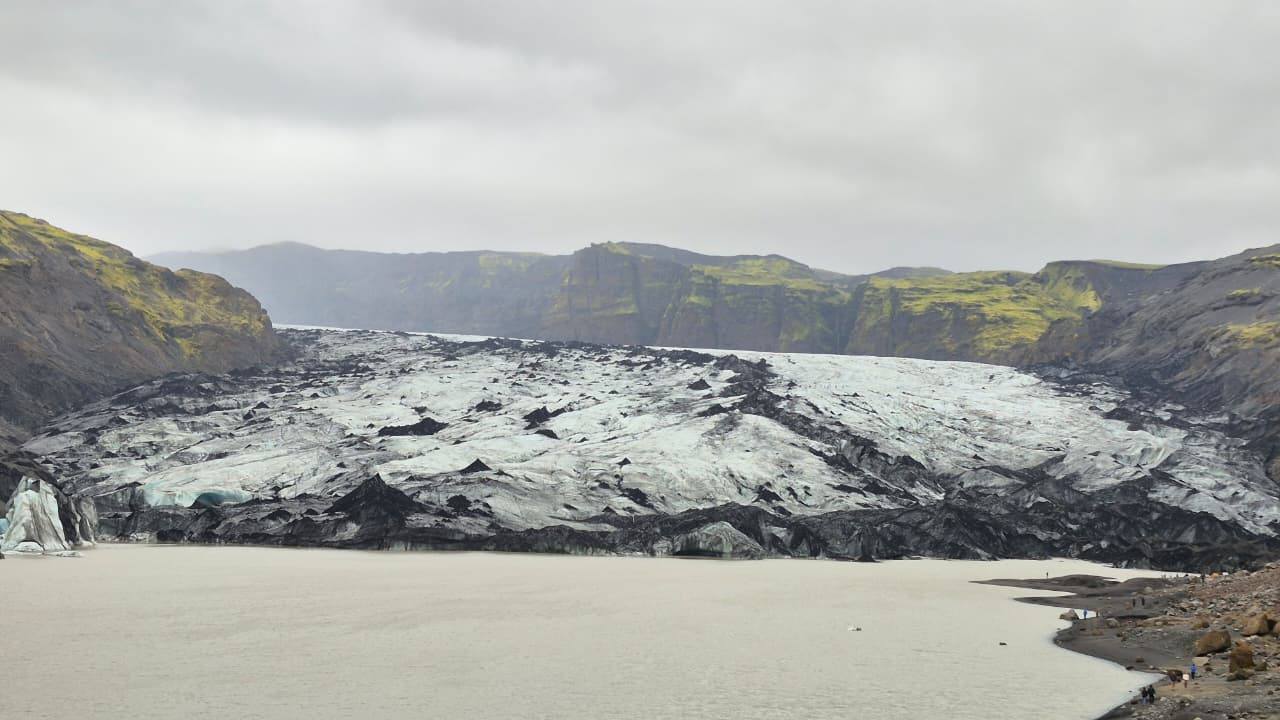
- August 2026
- Map of Mýrdalsjökull glacier showing its named outlet glaciers and surface glacial catchments (light grey shading) with Sólheimajökull catchment in red outline. (Note: All mappings of Mýrdalsjökull catchments identified had elements that suggest only partial mapping of surface glacial catchments for Mýrdalsjökull may exist hence the area of uncertainty assigned to Mýrdalsjökull in this mapping. Different mappings exist in some of the sources used in this article including subsurface catchments for jökulhlaups.) Clicking on the map rectangle to enlarge it, enables mouse over that allows identification of individual glaciers.
- Type: Outlet glacier
- Location: Southwestern Iceland
- Terminus: Sólheimajökull
- Status: Retreating

Sólheimajökull (Icelandic pronunciation: [ˈsoulˌheiːmaˌjœːkʏtl̥]) is an outlet glacier in southern Iceland, between the volcanoes Katla and Eyjafjallajökull. Part of the larger Mýrdalsjökull glacier, Sólheimajökull is a prominent and popular tourist location owing to its size and relative ease of access.

== Geology ==
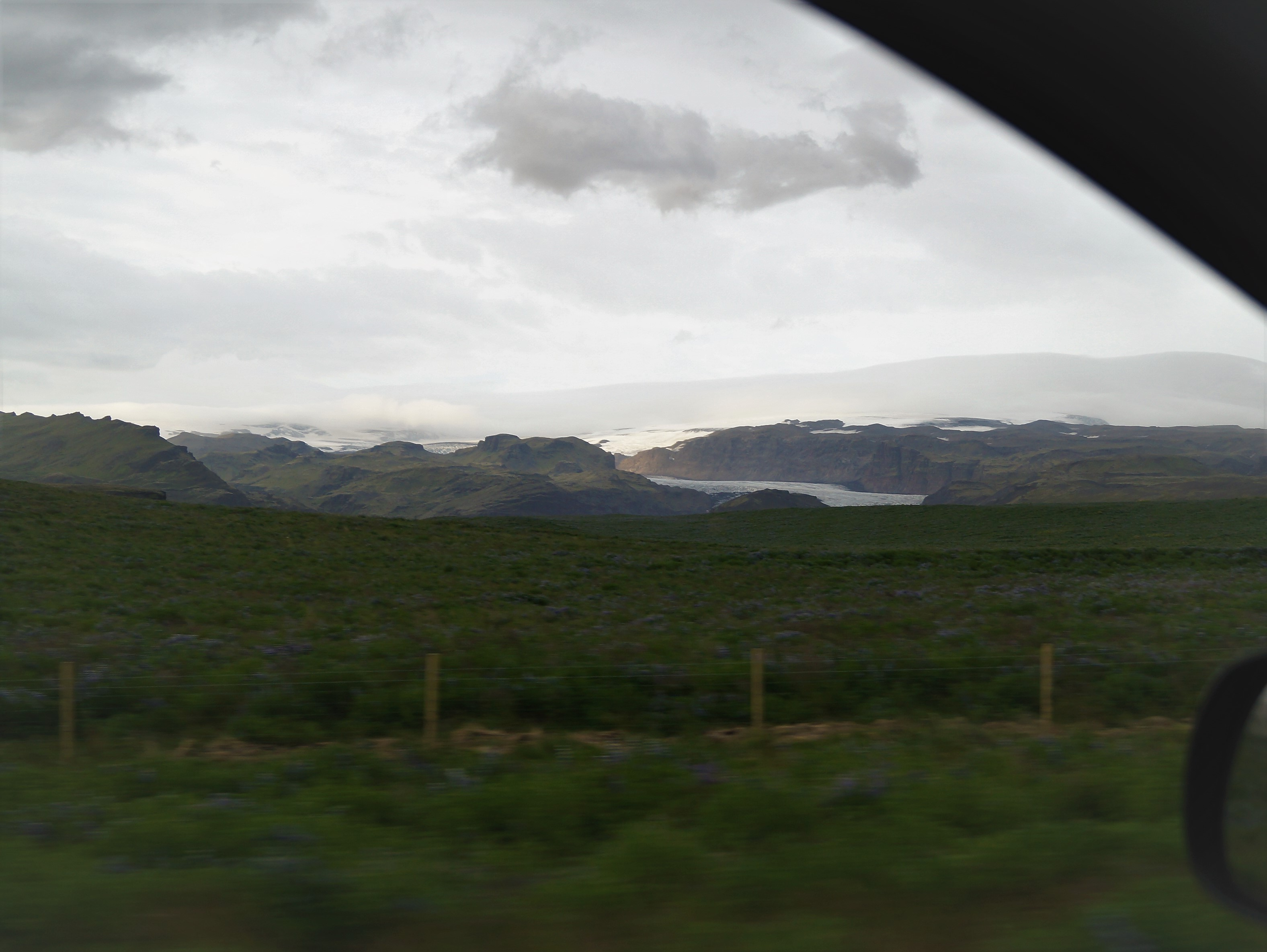
Sólheimajökull in its valley with Mýrdalsjökull behind

Sólheimajökull is an outlet glacier of the Mýrdalsjökull ice cap which lies atop the Katla caldera. It is located near the town of Vík í Mýrdal, a popular tourist location about 180 km (110 mi) southeast of Reykjavík. The glacier is melting rapidly around 60 metres (200 ft) per year owing to warmer annual temperatures due to climate change. It is possible that many of the country's glaciers will become extinct within the next century.

== Risks ==
The occasional potentially dangerous glacial lake outburst flood (Jökulhlaups) may use this route to the sea.

In the summer of 2026 visitors to the glacier outlet were warned of the risk of unstable and unsafe conditions on both the glacier and hiking access routes due to melting of the glacier.

Sólheimajökull glacier panorama
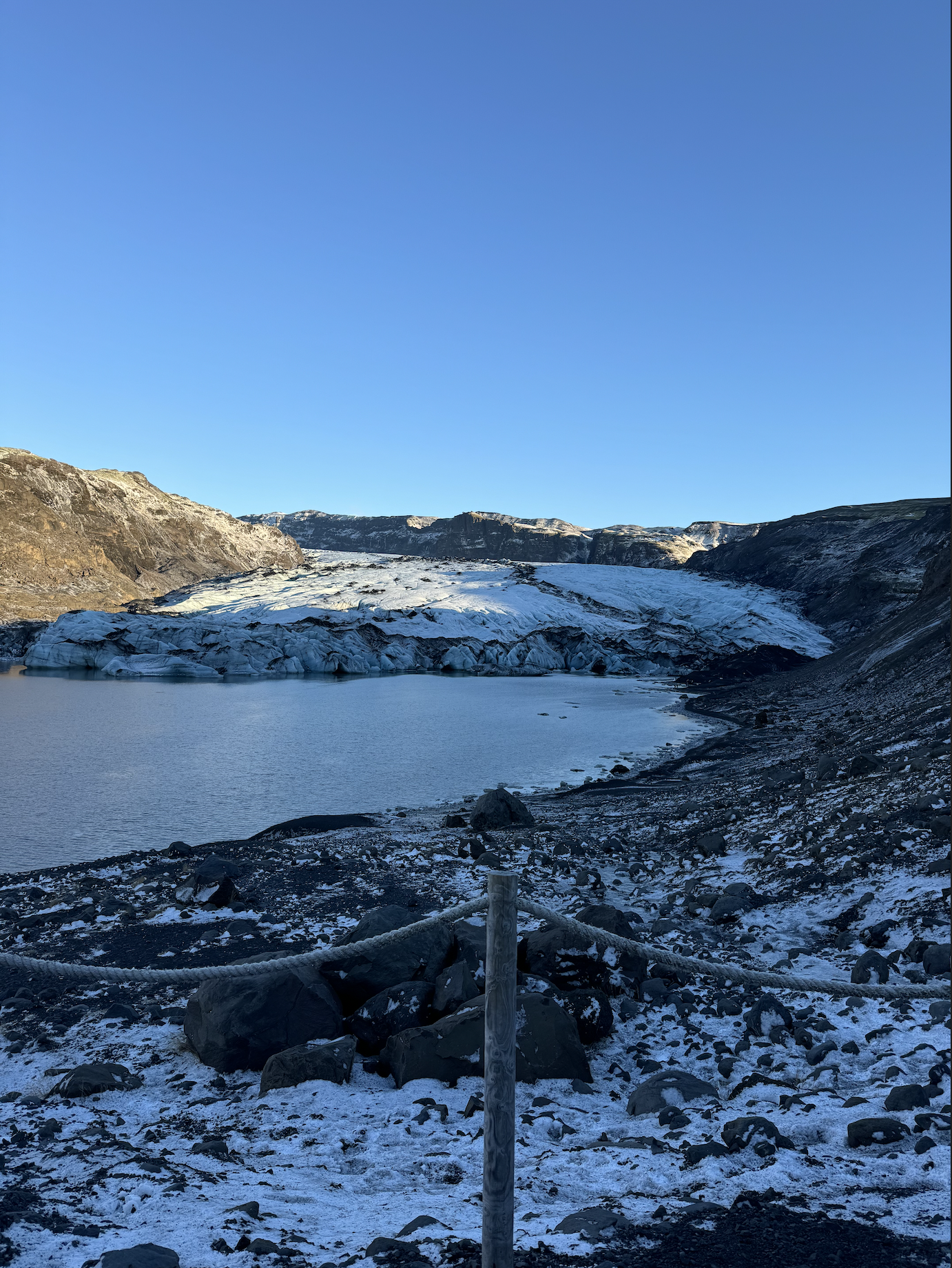
View of the glacier

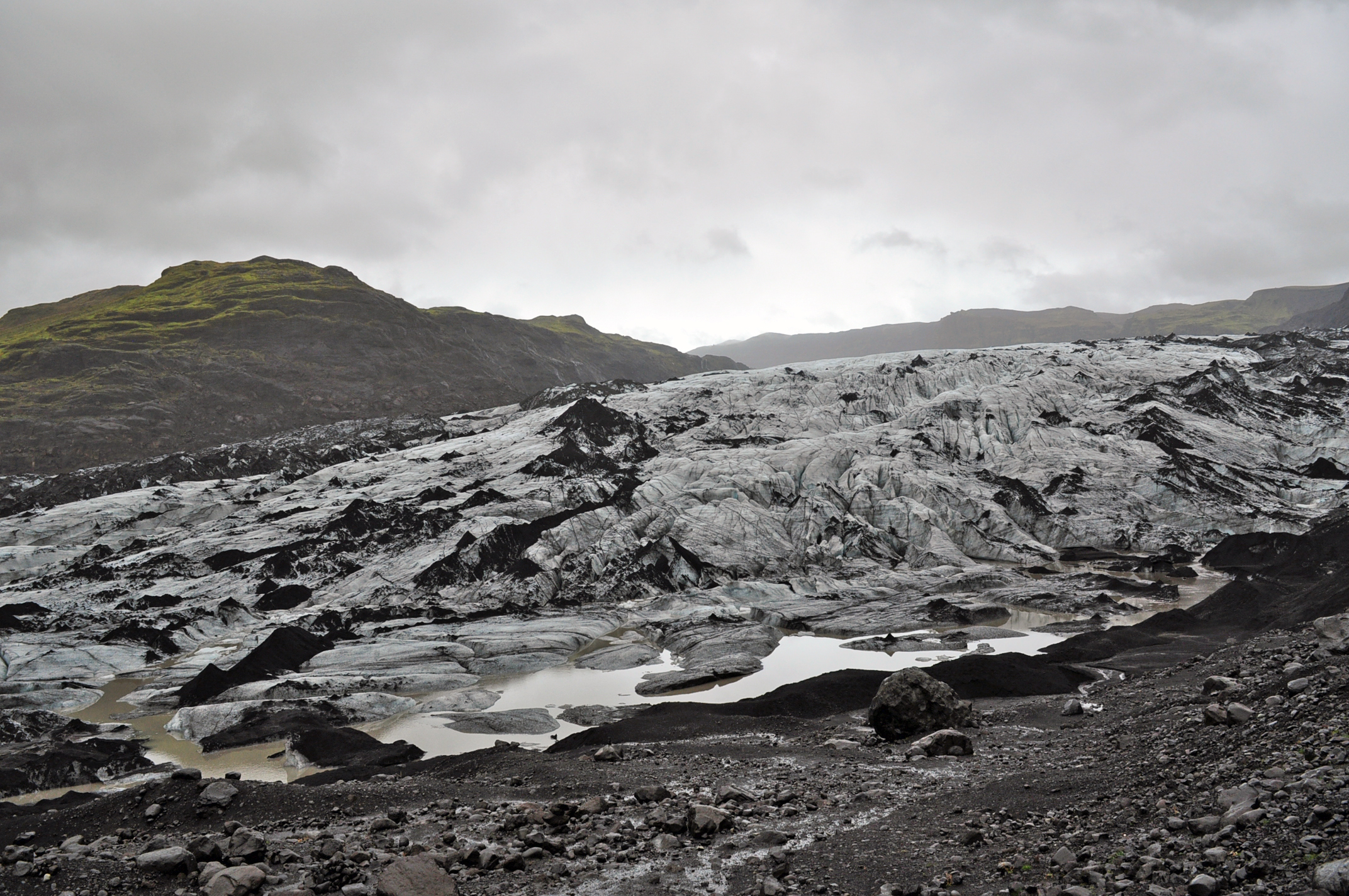
Outlet glacier

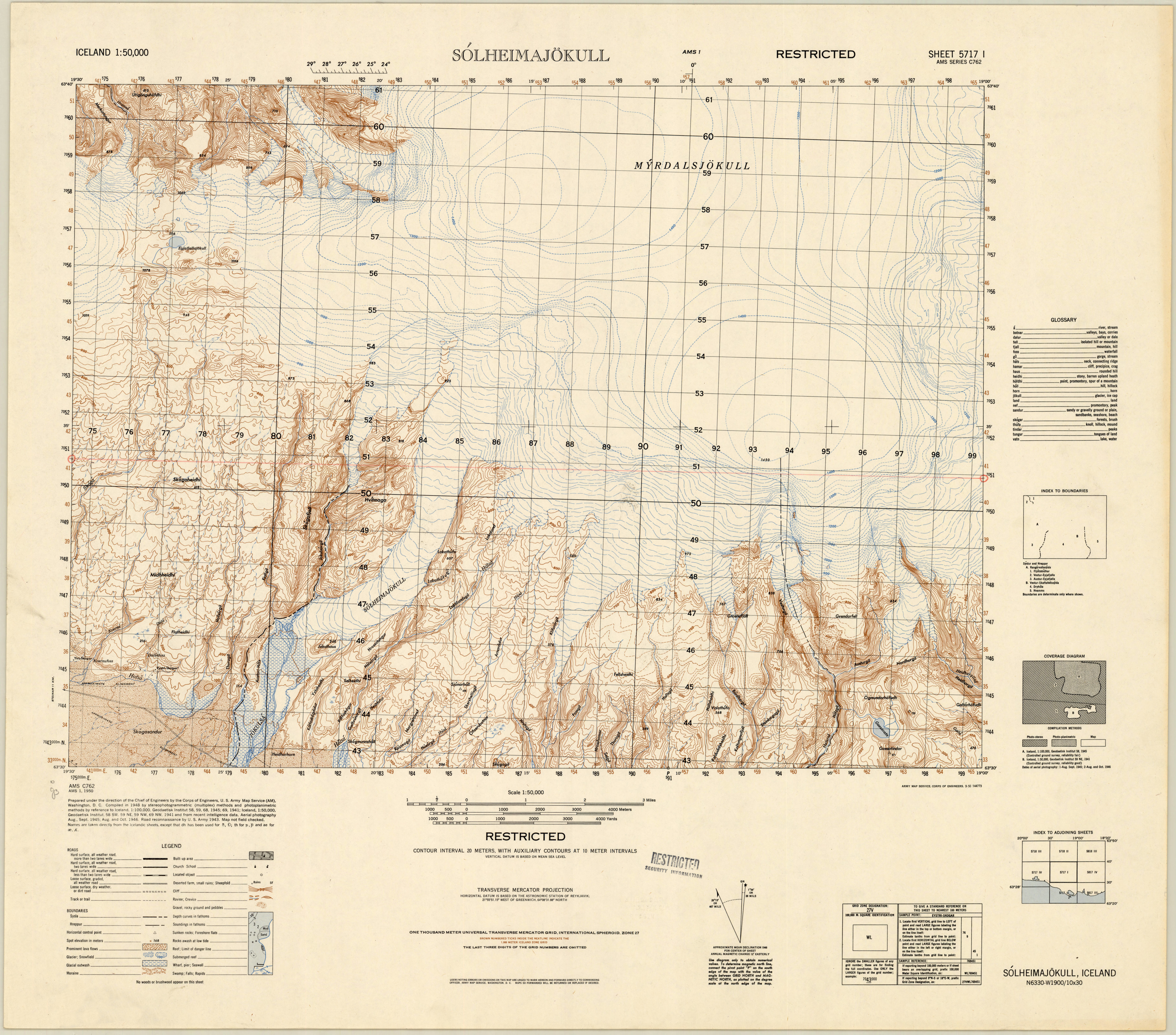
Map of Sólheimajökull, 1951
