= Veiðivötn =

Lake region in Iceland

- Map of Veiðivötn List of numbered map items: 1 Þjórsá; 2 Hrauneyjarón; 3 Sporðöldulón; 4 Krókslón; 5 Hnausapollur; 6 Grænavatn; 7 Litlisjór; 8 Hraunvötn; 9 Langosjór; 10 Þórisvatn Lakes and selected geological features including lava flows. Key: (lighter violet) 1477 lava flows; calderas; central volcanoes; fissure swarms; subglacial terrain above 1,100 m (3,600 ft); seismically active areas between 1995 and 2007; Clicking on the square icon enables mouse-over with expanded detail, including names of volcanic features.

Highest point
- Coordinates: 64°07′N 18°48′W

Geography
- Location: Southern Region, Iceland (Highlands)

Geology
- Mountain type: Fissure vents
- Last eruption: 1477

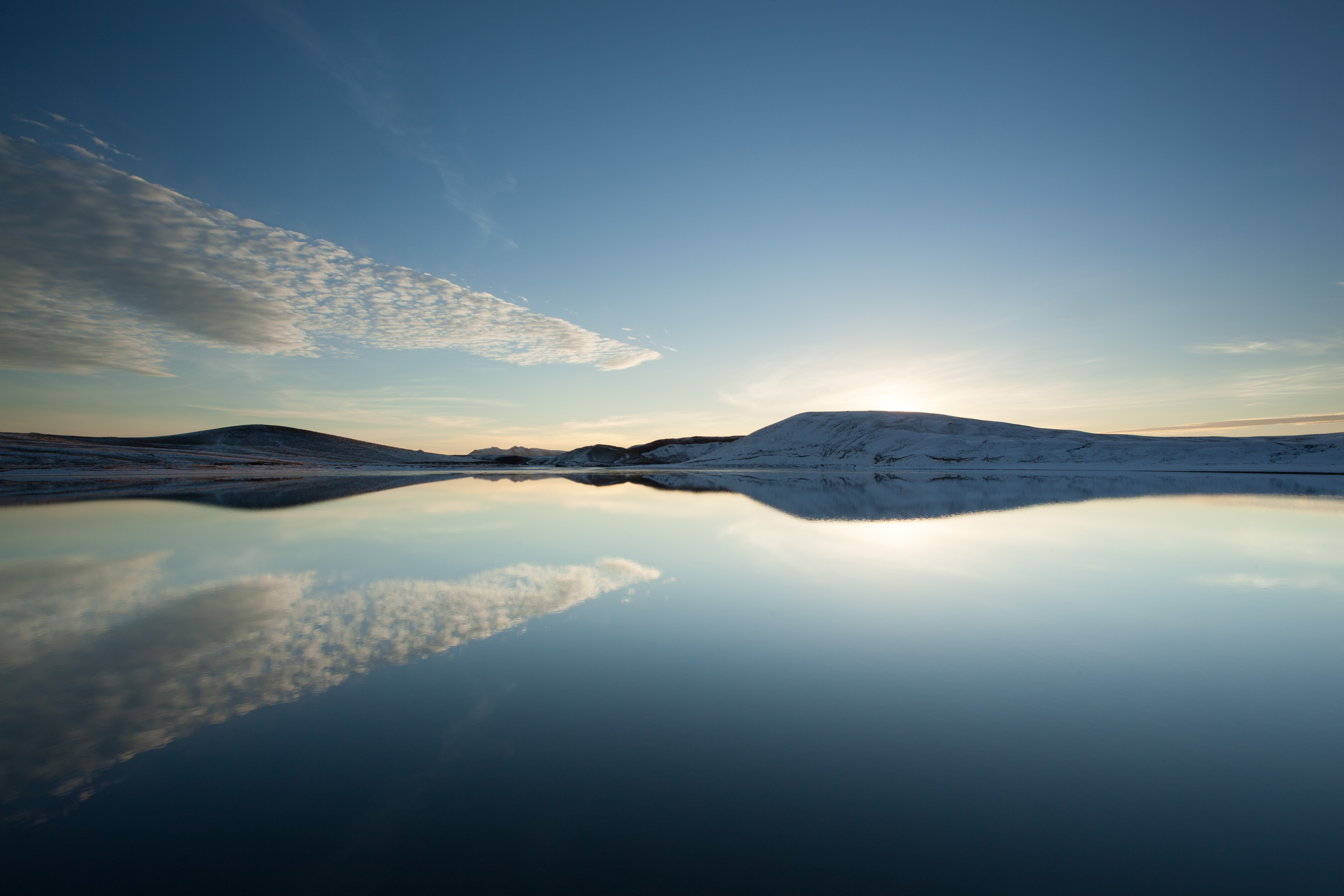
Grænavatn [ˈkraiːnaˌvahtn̥] ("green lake").

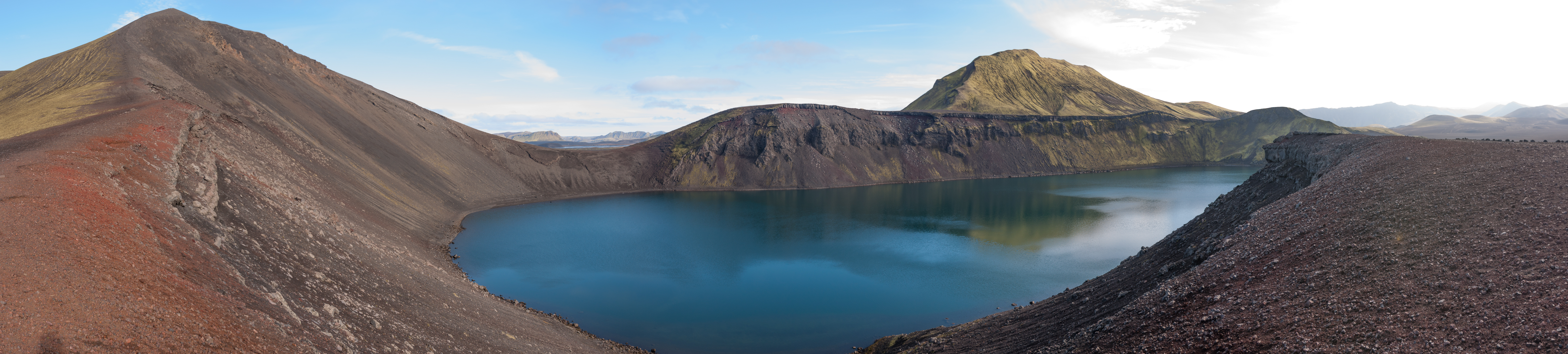
Hnausapollur [ˈn̥œyːsaˌpʰɔtlʏr̥].

Veiðivötn (Icelandic pronunciation: [ˈveiːðɪˌvœhtn̥], "fishing lakes") is a volcanic lake region in the Highlands of central Iceland, where approximately 50 lakes fill two rows of fissure vents.

Geologically, Veiðivötn is part of the Bárðarbunga volcanic system.

In c. 6600 B.C., long before the settlement of Iceland, prehistoric eruptions from the region produced the Þjórsá Lava, the largest lava flow in Iceland, and the largest to have erupted anywhere on Earth during the Holocene. Veiðivötn's current landscape was created in 1477 by an explosive VEI-6 fissure eruption of tholeiitic basalt. It was the largest volcanic eruption in Iceland's recorded history.

Today, many of the fissures from the 1477 eruption are filled with water lakes that have become popular for trout fishing.
