= Arnarstapi =

- Village
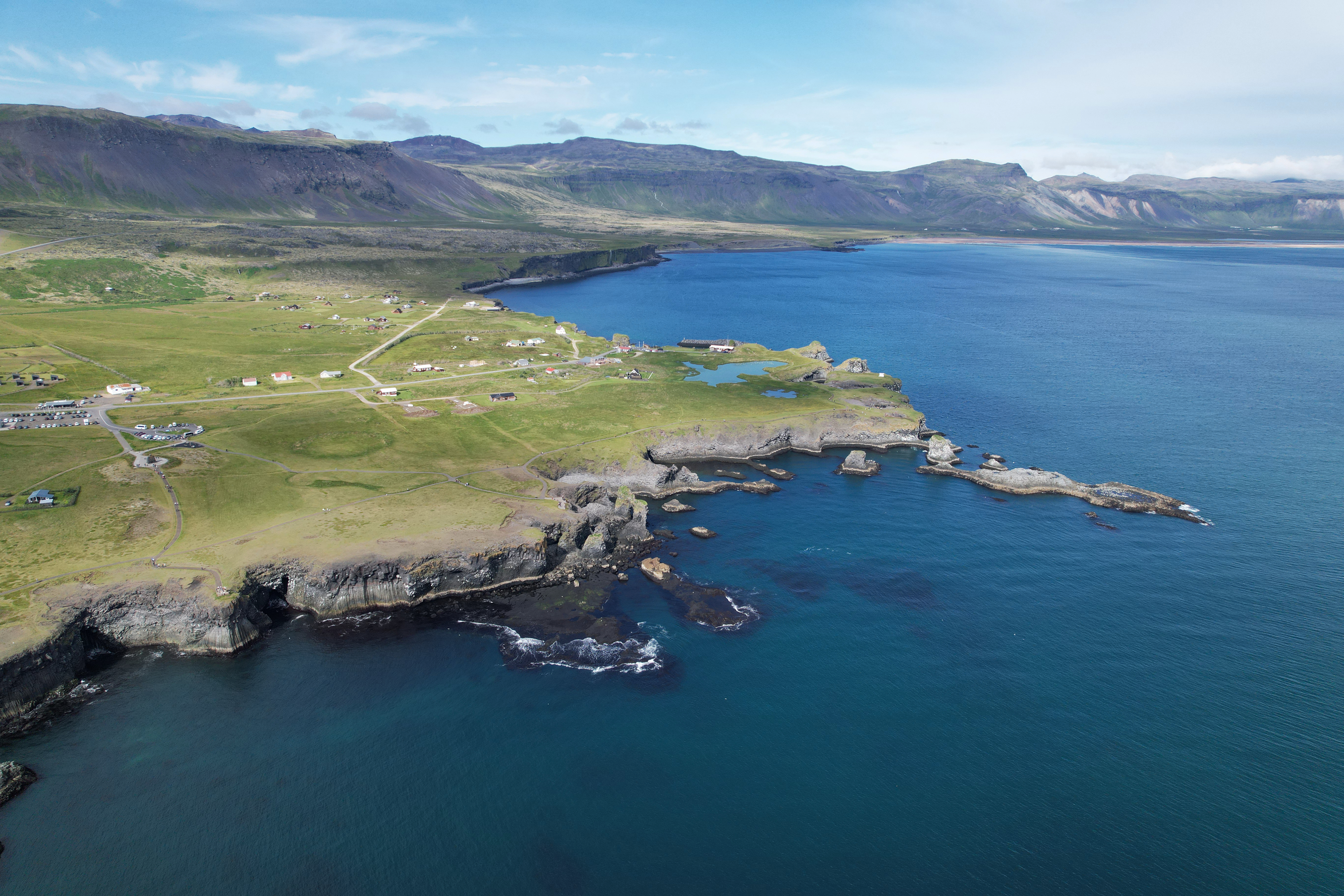

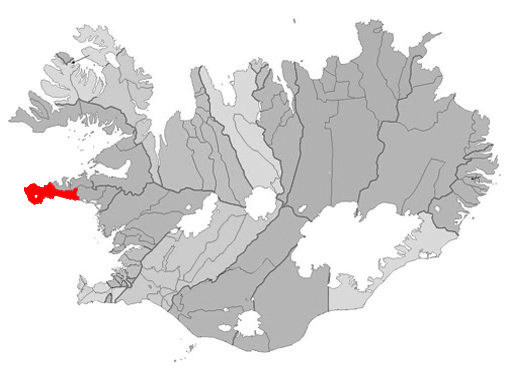
- Location of the Municipality of Snæfellsbær

- Location of Arnarstapi in Iceland
- Coordinates: 64°46′N 23°37′W
- Country: Iceland
- Constituency: Northwest Constituency
- Region: Western Region
- Municipality: Snæfellsbær
- Time zone: UTC+0 (GMT)

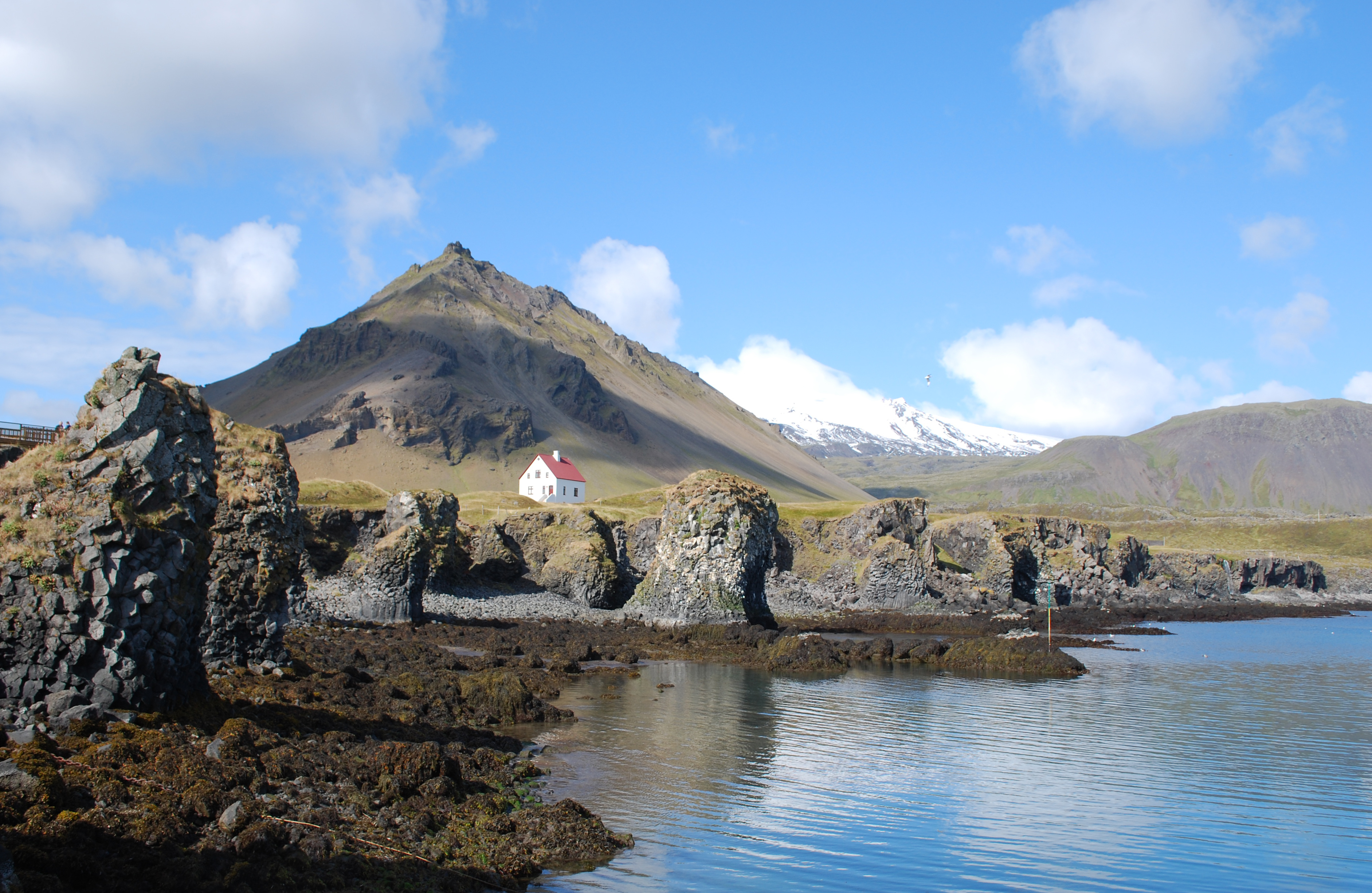
Cliffs near Arnarstapi village

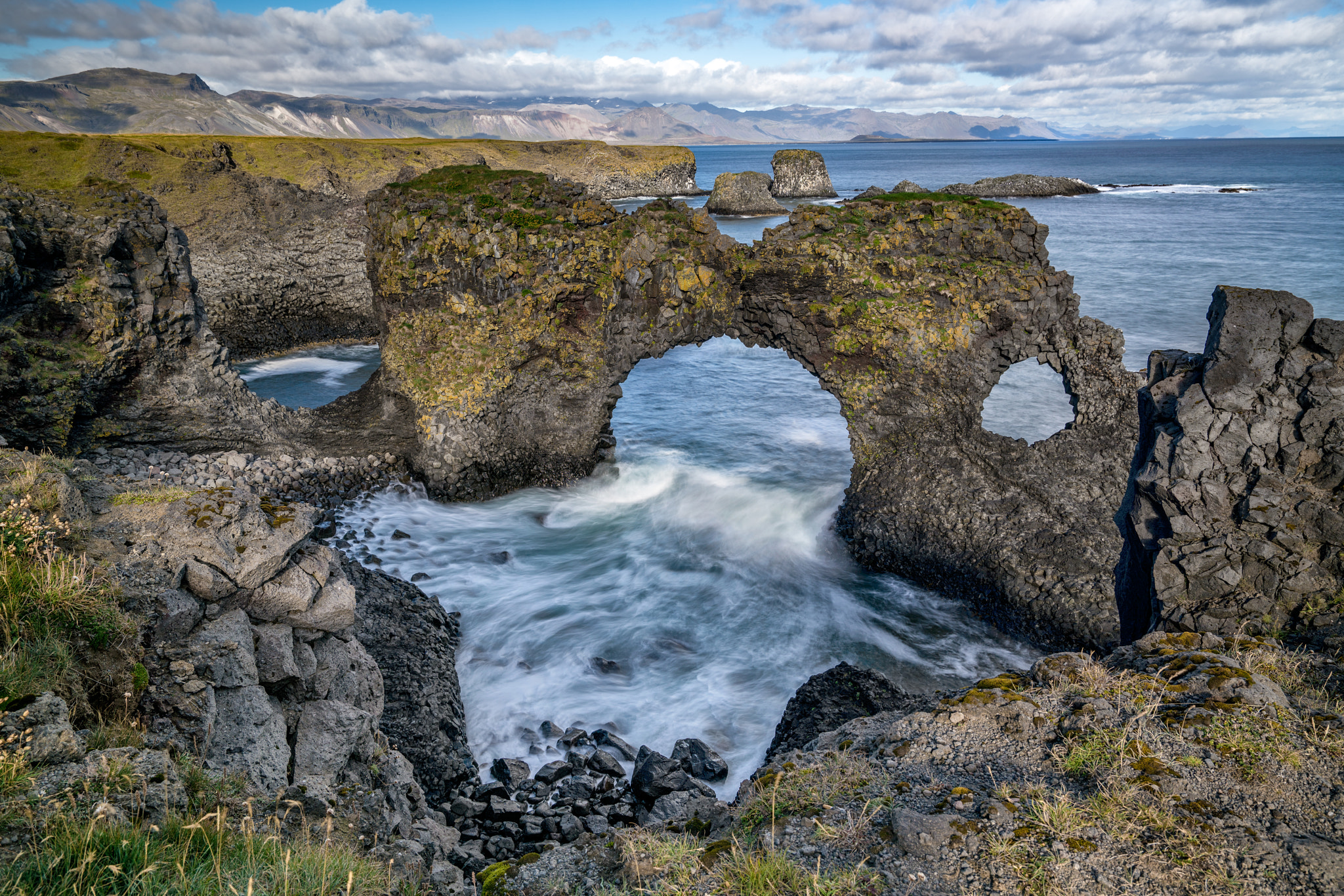
Gatklettur

Arnarstapi (Icelandic pronunciation: [ˈa(r)tnarˌstaːpɪ]) or Stapi is a small fishing and tourist village at the foot of Mt. Stapafell [ˈstaːpaˌfɛtl̥] between Hellnar village and Breiðavík [ˈpreiːðaˌviːk] farms on the southern side of Snæfellsnes, Iceland.

Placenames in the vicinity of Arnarstapi and nearby Hellnar village are inspired by Bárðar saga Snæfellsáss, an Icelandic saga relating the story of Bárður, a half human and half ogre. Arnarstapi was a natural site for landings and harbor for small vessels, and therefore ideal for a shipping port. In the olden days, Arnarstapi was thus from very early on, a busy fishing port and commercial centre servicing the West coast area under the Danish crown and a merchant monopoly of Denmark was in effect from 1565. From then on and through the 17th and 18th century, agents of the Danish crown had custodial power over Arnarstapi and commercial rights by royal appointment over nearby lands, formerly owned by Helgafell monastery and monopoly of all trade in the area. Several old houses from that time, each with its own unique history, can be seen at Arnarstap, including the old Amtmannshús (The Danish Prefect's Residence), which was moved in 1849 to nearby Vogur á Mýrum [ˈvouː(ɣ)ʏr auː ˈmiːrʏm], where it stayed until 1983, when it was moved back again to Arnarstapi in 1985 and declared a historical site in 1990. Danish Prefect Bjarni Thorsteinsson (1821–1849), whose son was renowned poet and writer Steingrímur Thorsteinsson, resided at the Amtmannshús, as did other notables.

Today Arnarstapi is still a somewhat busy harbor during the summer months, serving both fishing and recreational vessels. Its docks were renovated in 2002. Arnarstapi is a centre for local summer tourism activities, as here are a variety of natural and culinary attractions, and a cluster of second homes are located in and around the village. An old horse trail past Neðstavatn [ˈnɛðstaˌvahtn̥] is now a popular hiking trail (about a one hour hike) across the lava and along the beach between Arnarstapi and Hellnar. The lava field is called Hellnahraun, and its western coast is a natural preserve, where the ancient small village of Hellnar may be found.

Along the coast there are natural rock formations; here the waves of the ocean play along with the sunlight of the northern sky, locations of particular note being the cliff Gatklettur [ˈkatˌkʰlɛhtʏr̥], and the rifts Hundagjá [ˈhʏntaˌcauː], Miðgjá [ˈmɪðˌcauː] and Músagjá [ˈmuːsaˌcauː]. Near Arnarstapi there are other natural formations such as Rauðfeldsgjá, Dritvík [ˈtrɪtˌviːk], Bjarnarfoss [ˈpja(r)tnarˌfɔsː] and Lóndrangar.

== In literature and the arts ==
In Jules Verne's A Journey to the Center of the Earth, Stapi is the last stop on the route the protagonists take before they climb Snæfellsjökull and enter the interior of the planet through a tunnel in the crater.

== Sources ==
- The Coast Arnarstapi to Hellnar nat.is
- https://web.archive.org/web/20110722022617/http://www.west.is/Home/AboutWestIceland/TownsVillages/Olafsvik/Placesofinterest/67
- Þorsteinn Jósepsson, Steindór Steindórsson, Páll Líndal, Landið þitt Ísland, A-G,Örn og Örlygur 1982
