= Hellnahraun =

Lava field in Iceland

Coordinates: 64°45′30″N 23°39′53″W

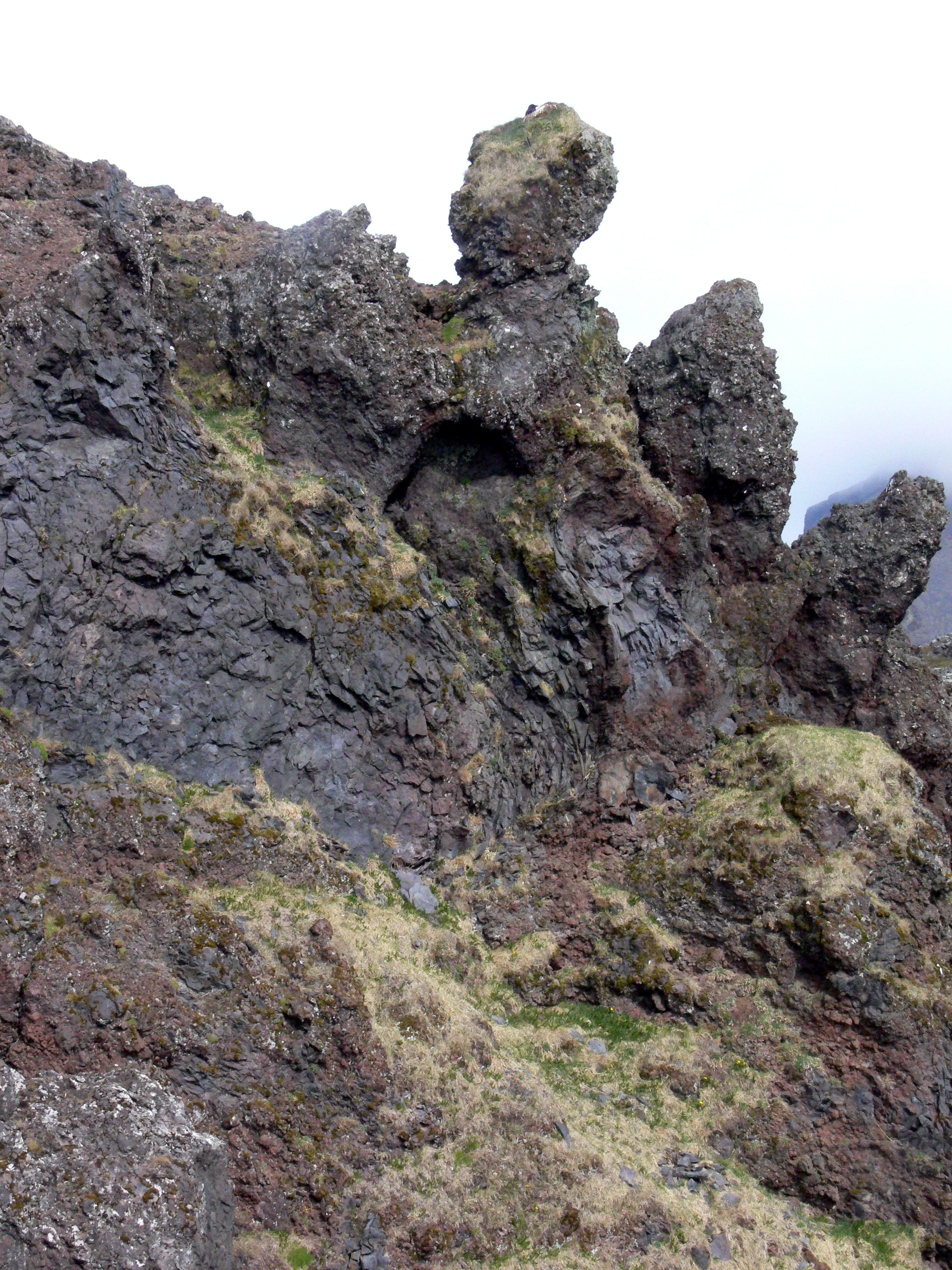
Hellnahraun

Hellnahraun (Icelandic pronunciation: [ˈhɛtlnaˌr̥œyːn]) is a lava field between Arnarstapi and Hellnar in Snæfellsnes, Iceland. The source of Hellnahraun lava field is a crater near Jökulháls [ˈjœːkʏlˌhauls], now covered by the Snæfellsjökull glacier. Radiocarbon dating suggests that the Hellnahraun was formed in two different eruptions during the following time intervals: 894-923 AD and 938-983 AD.
