= Hótel Búðir =

Hotel in west Iceland

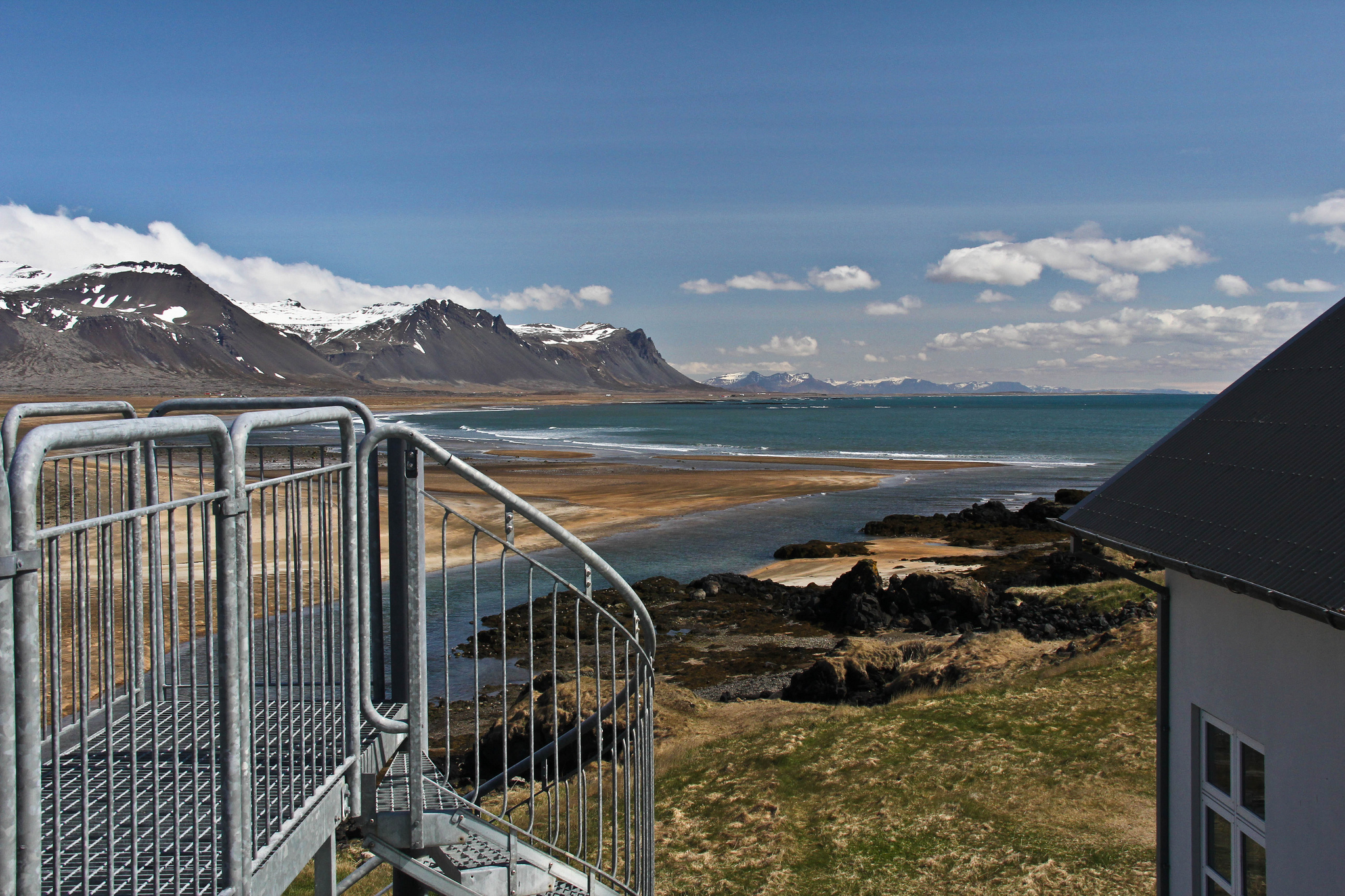
- Búðir seen from Hótel Búðir

- Location within Iceland

General information
- Location: Búðir, Snæfellsbær, Iceland
- Coordinates: 64°50′N 23°33′W
- Opening: 1947; 2003 (rebuilt after fire)

Other information
- Number of rooms: 28
- Number of restaurants: 1

Website
- www.hotelbudir.is

Hótel Búðir (Hotel Budir) is a hotel built near Búðir, situated on a lava field on the westernmost tip of the Snaefellsnes peninsula in west Iceland. The hotel affords views over the Atlantic coast and the glacier-topped Snæfellsjökull volcano and glacier, and is located in a protected nature reserve.

The hotel is a three-hour drive north from Keflavík International Airport.

== History ==
The hotel originally opened as a guesthouse and fish restaurant in 1947 on the site of an old apartment-store complex. It was converted to a limited-liability company in 1956. Icelandic author and Nobel prize winner Halldor Laxness was a frequent guest in the hotel, writing in a room which had views over the Snæfellsjökull glacier. The Icelandic painter Johannes Kjarval also stayed there.

The hotel was completely destroyed by a fire on 21 February 2001, and the current hotel building was constructed on the site, opening as a hotel on 14 June 2003. The hotel now has 28 bedrooms, varying in size, aspect and amenities, and the hotel restaurant can seat eighty people.

== Local amenities and activities ==
The only other building in the immediate vicinity is Búðir Church, a small black wooden church dating from the 19th century, located a few minutes' walk from the hotel. Some guests use the church as a wedding venue.

Activities available in the surrounding area include horse riding, glacier tours, sailing and hiking.

== Gallery ==
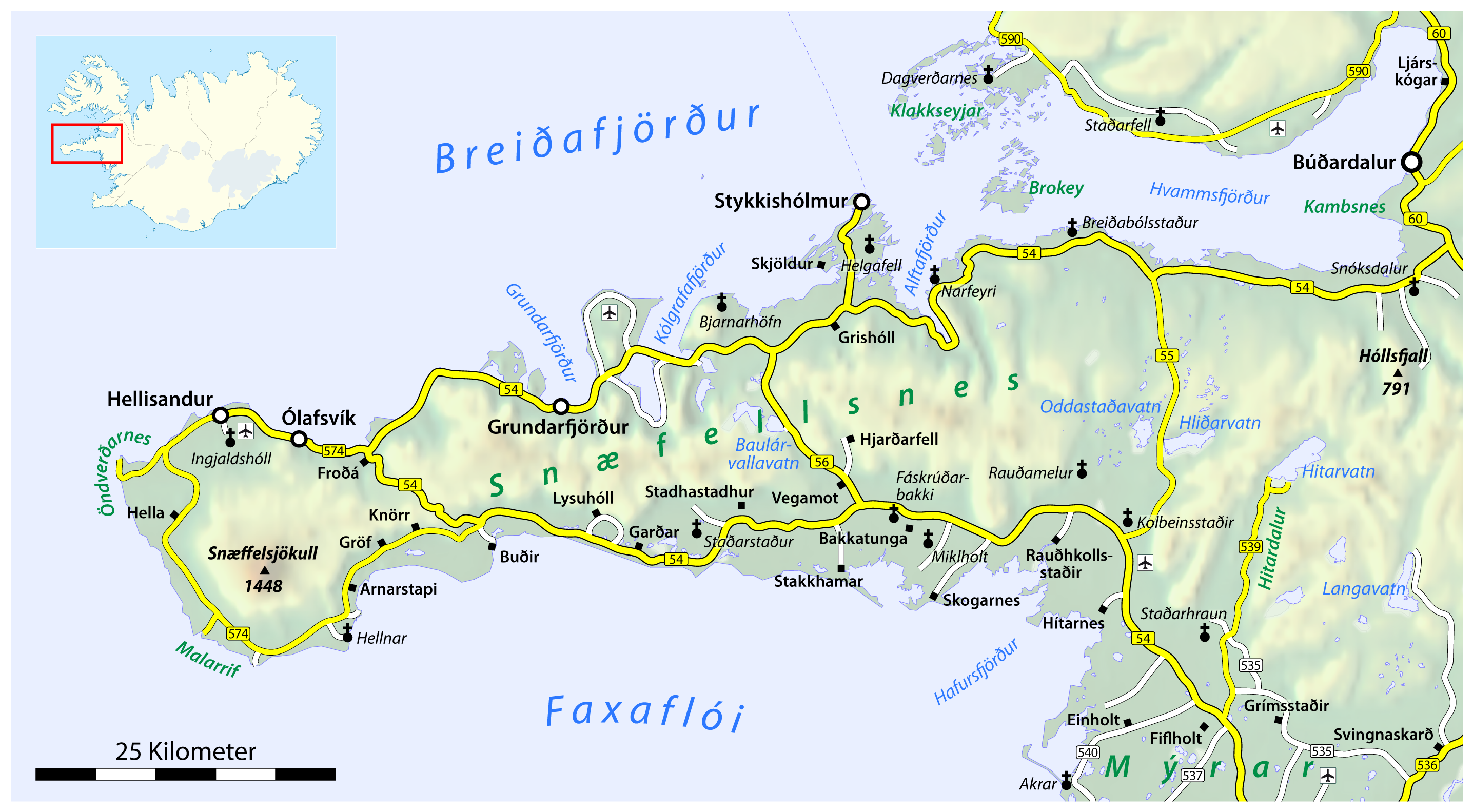
Snæfellsnes peninsula

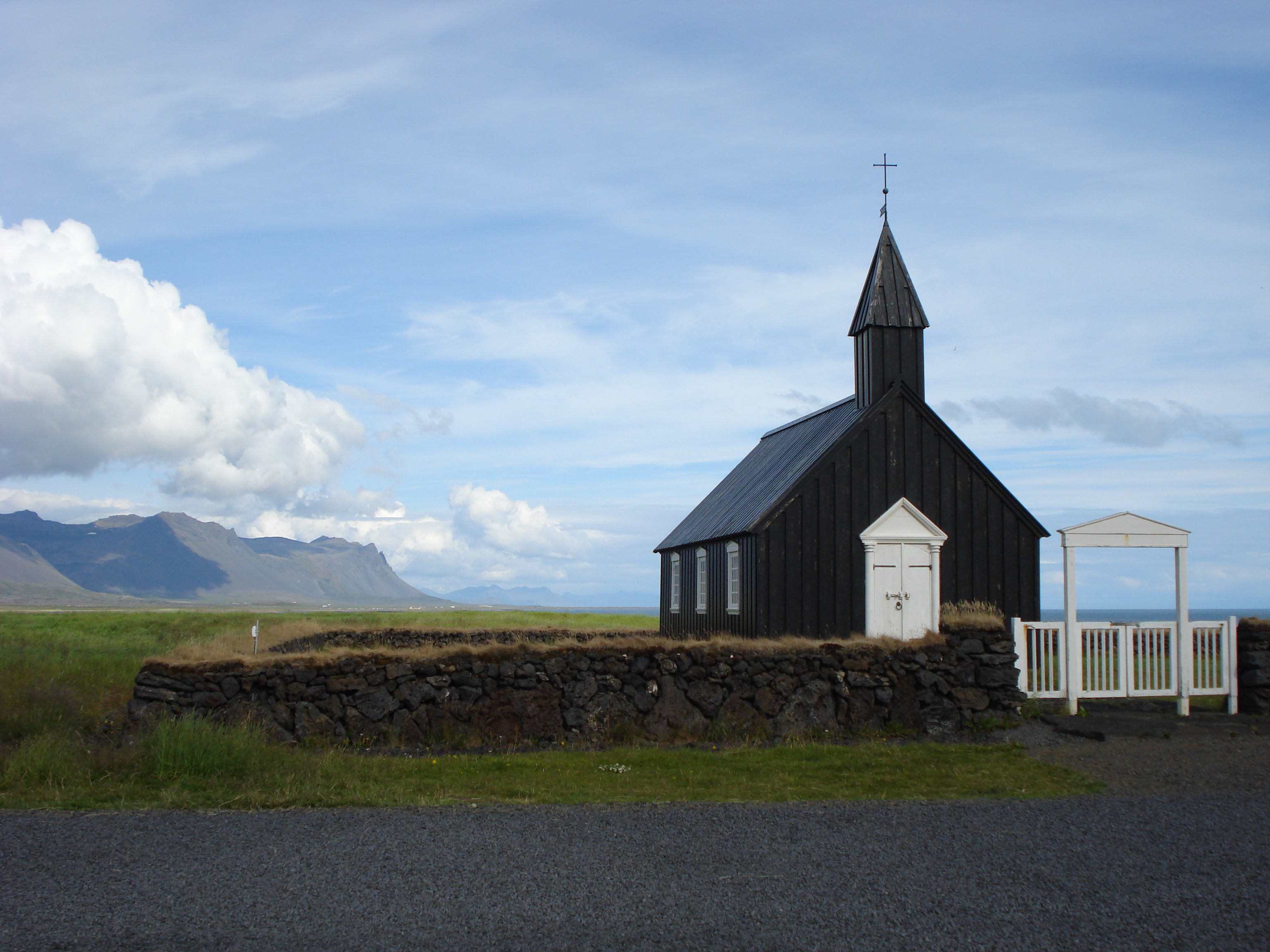
The church at Búðir

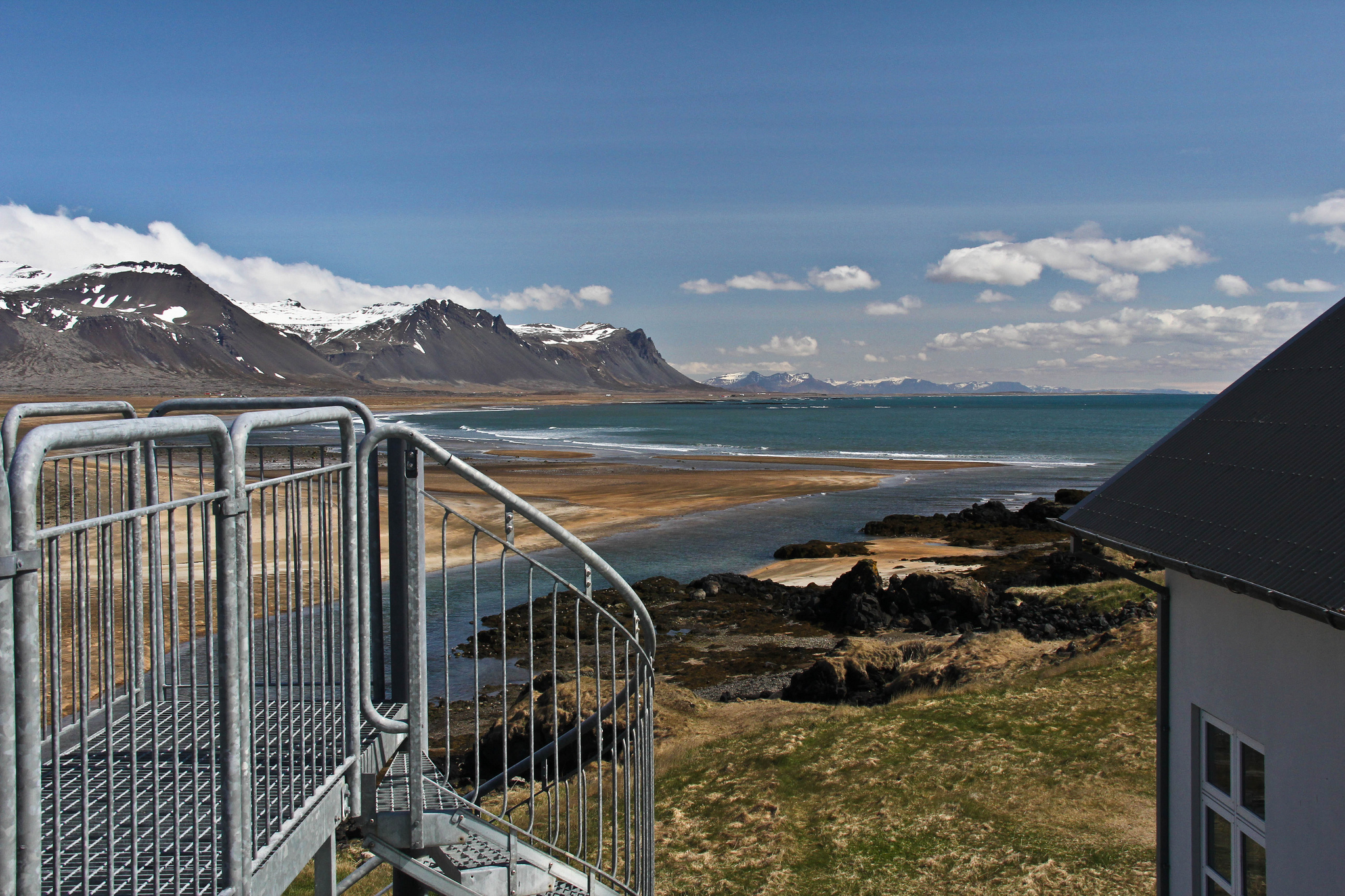
View from the hotel

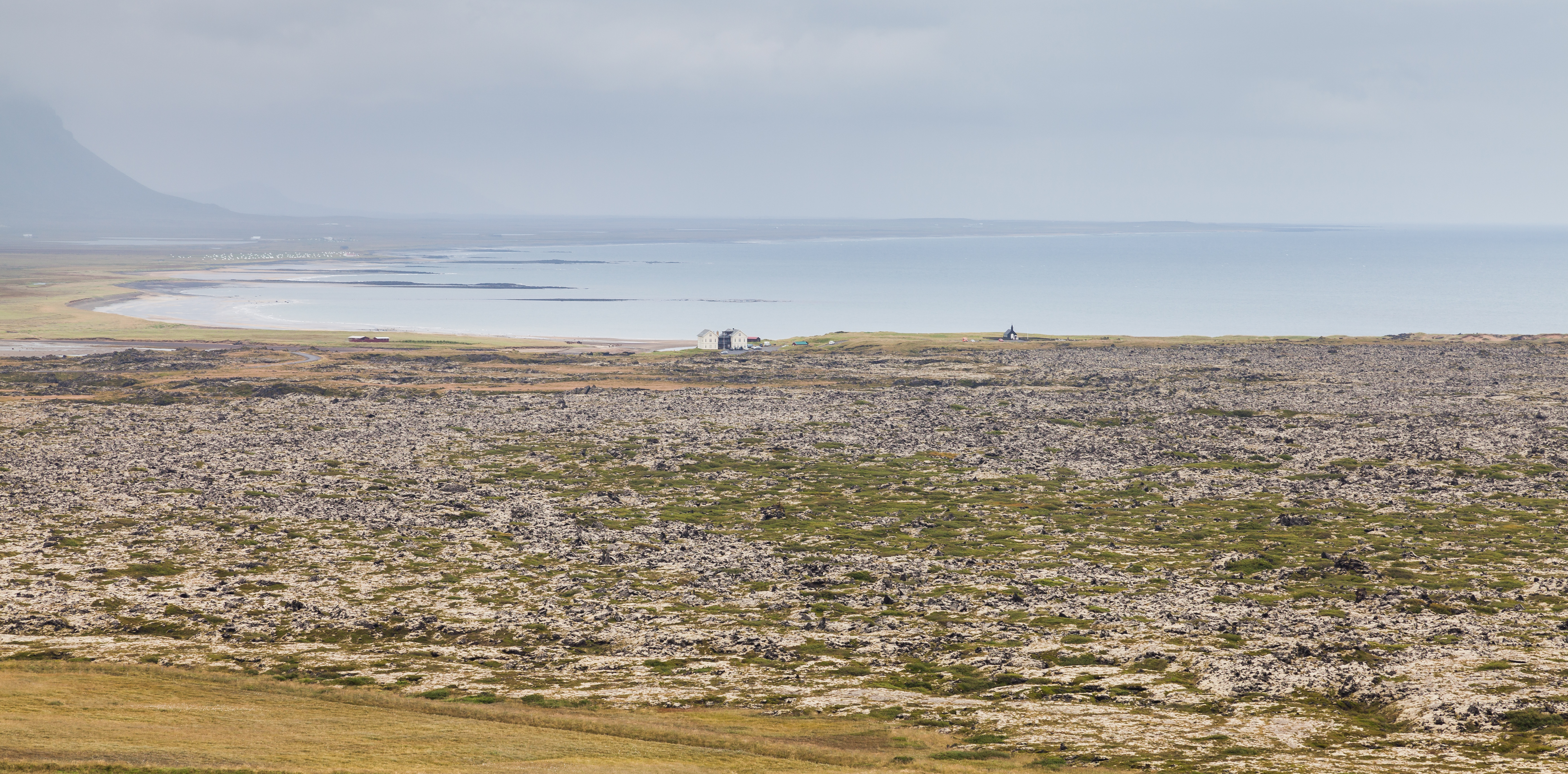
Location and landscape in the region of Búðahraun, Vesturland, Iceland

== See also ==
- List of restaurants in Iceland
