= Snæfellsbær =

- Municipality
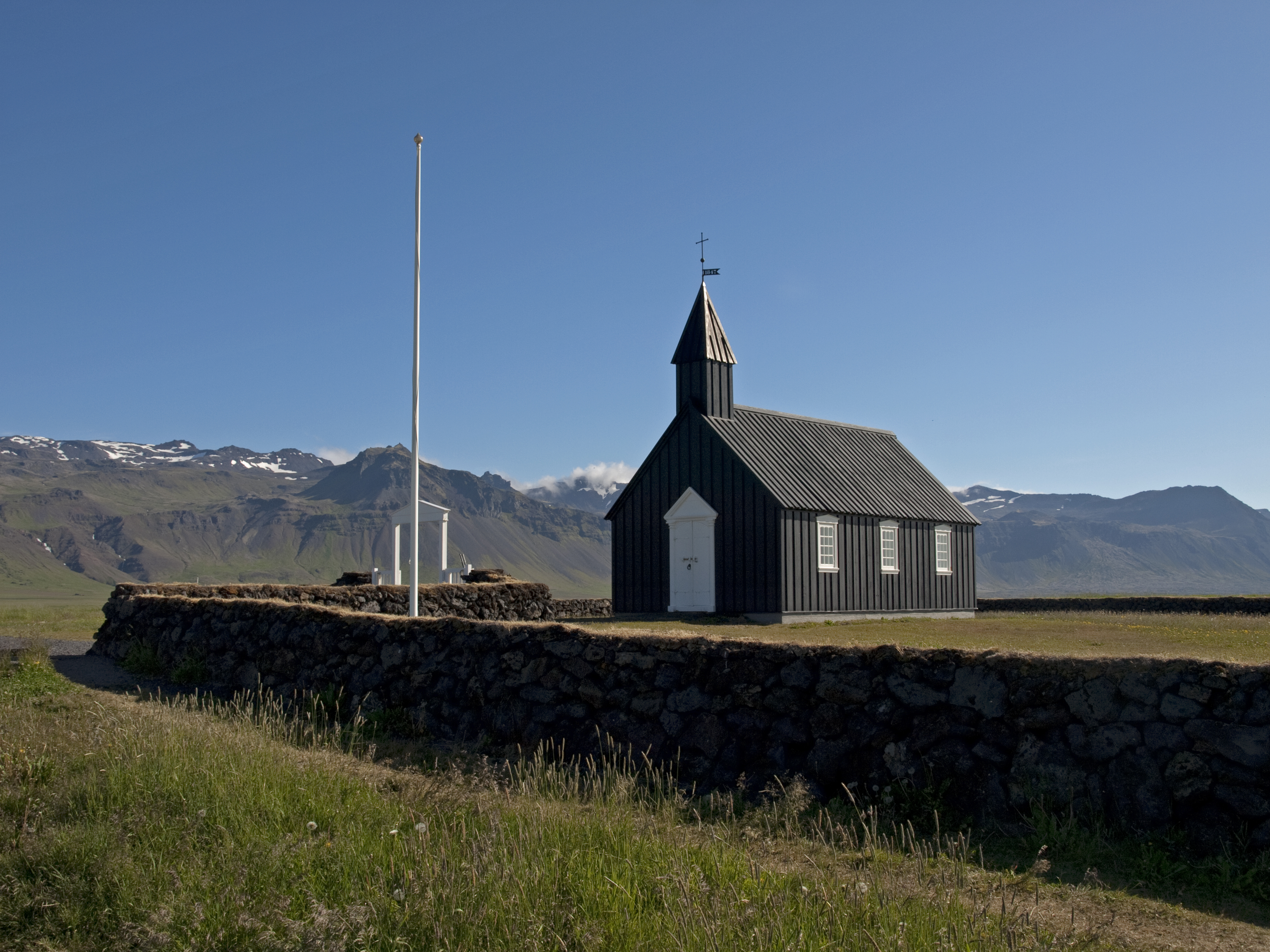
- Skyline of Snæfellsbær

- Location of Snæfellsbær

- Location within Iceland
- Coordinates: 64.898°N 23.705°W
- Country: Iceland
- Region: Western Region
- Constituency: Northwest Constituency

Government
  - Mayor: Kristinn Jónasson

Area
  - Total: 684 km^{2} (264 sq mi)

Population
  - Total: 1,691
  - Density: 2.47/km^{2} (6.4/sq mi)
- Postal code(s): 355, 356, 360
- Municipal number: 3714
- Website: snb.is

Snæfellsbær (Icelandic pronunciation: [ˈs(t)naiːˌfɛlsˌpaiːr̥]) is a municipality located in western Iceland, in the southwestern part of the Snæfellsnes Peninsula. Its administrative centre is Hellissandur and the majority of the residents live in the coastal villages of Ólafsvík, then Hellissandur and Rif. There is a small airfield near Rif and at Gufuskálar the Hellissandur longwave radio mast. Along the municipality's south-east coast is the settlement of Búðir and the Hótel Búðir and closer to the volcano of Snæfellsjökull are the coastal villages of Hellnar and Arnarstapi.

== Twin towns – sister cities ==
Snæfellsbær is twinned with:

- Vestmanna, Faroe Islands

== See also ==
- Búðir
- Djúpalónssandur
