= Bárðar saga Snæfellsáss =

Icelandic saga

- The family tree of Bárðr Snæfellsáss, showing major characters from the saga.
- Language: Old Icelandic
- Genre: Saga
- Publication place: Iceland

Bárðar saga Snæfellsáss (Old Norse: [ˈbɒːrðar ˈsaɣa ˈsnæːˌfɛlːsˌɒːsː]; Modern Icelandic: [ˈbaurðar ˈs̺aːɣa ˈs̺naiːˌfɛls̺ˌaus̺]) or Bárðar saga Snæfellsáss ok Gests is a late saga of the Icelanders with legendary elements. It falls into two sections, one about Bárðr and the other about his son, Gestr; the first part takes place in Snæfellsnes in Iceland.

== History ==
Bárðar saga Snæfellsáss is a relatively late Íslendingasaga, probably dating to the early 14th century. It is preserved in 16th- and 17th-century paper and vellum manuscripts and one fragment of about 1400. The saga falls into two sections that were distinguished in the early 18th century and are probably by different authors.

== Synopsis ==
=== Section 1 ===
In chapters 1–10, Bárðar saga, the main character is Bárðr Snæfellsáss. The saga draws on legendary material and Heimskringla and contains excerpts from Landnámabók.

Bárðr's mother was human, but his father was half risi and half troll, and he was fostered by Dofri, the "mountain-dweller" of Dovrefjell. By his first wife, Dofri's daughter Flaumgerðr (who also had a human mother), Bárðr had three tall, beautiful daughters: Helga, Þordís and Guðrún. By his second wife, Herþrúðr, who was human, he had six more daughters.

Bárðr, his wife and his daughters emigrated to Iceland and came ashore at a lagoon on the south shore of Snæfellsnes which they named Djúpalón; he built himself a farm which he called Laugarbrekka. Þorkell, Bárðr's half-brother from his mother's second marriage to a jötunn, lived at Arnarstapi and had two sons, Rauðfeldr (Red-cloak) and Sölvi. The sons of Þorkell and the daughters of Bárðr used to play together. One day, when there was pack ice along the shore, Rauðfeldr pushed Helga out to sea on an iceberg. She drifted unharmed to Greenland and there found a lover, but Bárðr was infuriated. He pushed Rauðfeldr into the Rauðfeldsgjá ravine and threw Sölvi off Sölvahamar, a high cliff on the coast east of Arnarstapi. Bárðr and Þorkell fought and Þorkell's leg was broken; he moved out of the district.

After these events, Barðr gave away his land and vanished into the Snæfellsjökull ice cap. He became known as Bárðr Snæfellsáss, meaning the "guardian spirit" of Snæfell, because "they practically worshipped him on the peninsula and called upon him in times of difficulty. For many he also proved to be a source of real help in need". He wandered the region "in a grey cowl with a walrus-hide rope around him, and a cleft staff in his hand with a long and thick gaff," which he used when walking on glaciers. He brought Helga back from Greenland, but she pined for her lover and could not stand to stay with her father. When called on, he rowed out alone to save Ingjald of Ingjaldshvoll, who had been lured to a dangerous fishing spot by a troll-woman and kept there by a mysterious fellow fisherman who called himself Grímr and whom people thought "must have been Thor." He and Þorkell are said to have made peace and lived together for a while.

=== Section 2 ===
Chapters 11–20, Gests saga Bárðarsonar, are about Bárðr's son Gestr. He is named after the name his father gave, which means "guest".

Gestr has a grey-muzzled dog named Snati who is "the greatest companion . . . . better in battle than four men." He saves his half-brother from his human mother's marriage, Þorðr, from falling into a death-trap set by a þurs (giant) named Kolbjörn in connection with his marriage to Sólrún (who says her father is Gestr, although the saga states that there is no record of Gestr son of Bárðr having had children) and then travels with Þorðr, Þorðr's brother Þorvaldr, Sólrún, and Snati to Norway to the court of Olaf Tryggvason. The others convert to Christianity; Gestr resists but at the king's personal entreaty is primsigned.

The following Christmas, the court is visited by the draugr of King Raknarr of Helluland, who challenges a hero to come and take his treasures. At the king's suggestion, Gestr accepts the challenge, going with a priest called Jósteinn, a male and a female seið-worker, 17 other men and various supplies from the king, including a magic candle, and his dog. After a long voyage which includes a visit from Odin, who preaches heathenry and is hit on the head by the priest with his crucifix and falls overboard, and an ordeal on a lava field, they find Raknar's mound on a deserted island in the far north and with the priest's assistance, open it up. Gestr beheads the 500 men buried with Raknarr as crew for his huge ship and further underground, finds Raknarr sitting on his throne, but when he has taken from him all but his sword, the magic candle burns out and Gestr is attacked by Raknarr and all his men. He calls on his father, Bárðr, who appears but is unable to help, promises to convert to Christianity, and then calls on King Olaf, whose appearance "with a great light" drains Raknarr of his strength so that Gestr is able to cut off Raknarr's head and place it at his feet, which also deactivates his men. All the other members of the expedition have been driven mad and are fighting amongst themselves, so that only the priest and Snati are left to haul Gestr up. The dog drowns trying to reach the reef which connects the island to the mainland. The priest's holy water restores the men to sanity and parts the waves. On his return to Olaf's court, Gestr is baptised, but that night his father appears to him in a dream and destroys both his eyes for "allow[ing him]self to be forced to change . . . beliefs for lack of character." He dies the next day, still wearing his baptismal clothing.

== Editions and translations ==
=== Editions ===
Bárðar saga was first printed by Halldór Eiríksson in Hólar, Iceland in 1756 in Björn Markússon and Gísli Magnússon's Nokkrir margfróðir söguþættir (baekur.is). Modern editions include:

- Full text in modern Icelandic spelling at the Icelandic Saga Database
- Vigfússon, Guðbrandr, ed. (1860). Bárðarsaga Snæfellsáss, Viglundarsaga, Þórðarsaga, Draumavitranir, Völsaþáttr. Copenhagen: Nordiske literatur-samfund/Berlingske bogtrykkeri ved N.H. Stenderup. pp. 1–46.
- Ásmundarson, Valdimar, ed. (1902). Bárðar saga Snæfellsáss. Íslendinga sögur, 37. Reykjavík: Sigurður Kristjánsson.
- Vilmundarson, Þórhallur; Vilhjálmsson, Bjarni, eds. (1991). "Bárðar saga Snæfellsáss". Harðar saga; Bárðar saga, Þorskfirðinga saga, Flóamanna saga; Þórarins þáttr Nefjólfssonar, Þorsteins þáttr uxafóts, Egils þáttr Síðu-hallssonar, Orms þáttr Stórólfssonar, Þorsteins þáttr tjaldstœðings, Þorsteins þáttr forvitna, Bergbúa þáttr, Kumlbúa þáttr, Stjörnu-Odda draumr. Íslenzk fornrit, 13. Reykjavík: Hið Íslenzka Fornritafélag. pp. 99–172.

=== Translations ===
- Skaptason, Jón; Pulsiano, Phillip, eds. (1984). Bárðar saga. Translated by Skaptason, Jón; Pulsiano, Phillip. New York: Garland. pp. Garland Library of Medieval Literature, Series A, 8. ISBN 0824094247. (Icelandic text and English translation)
- "The Saga of Bard the Snowfell God". Icelandic Histories and Romances. Translated by O’Connor, Ralph. Stroud: Tempus. 2002. pp. 109–38. ISBN 0752419528.
- Anderson, Sarah M. (trans.). 1997. 'Bard's Saga', in The Complete Sagas of Icelanders, Including 49 Tales, 5 vols ed. by Viðar Hreinsson, Robert Cook et al. Reykjavík: Leifur Eiriksson, vol. 2 pp. 237–66. ISBN 9979929308
