= Ljósufjöll =

Fissure vent system and central volcano in Iceland

Coordinates: 64.87°N 22.23°W

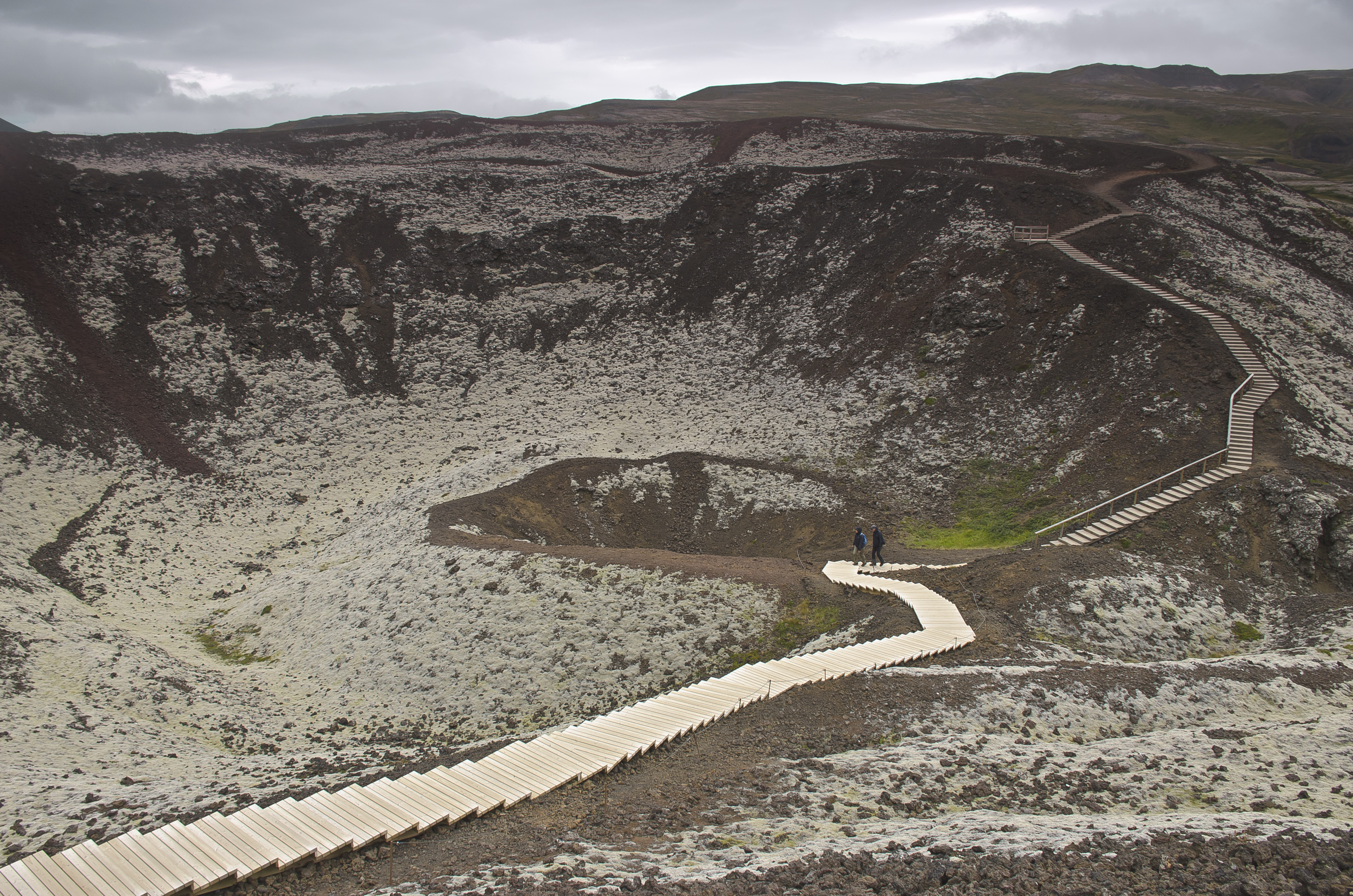
- Grábrók [ˈkrauːˌprouːk] crater

Highest point
- Elevation: 1,063 m (3,488 ft)

Geography
- Approximate map of central volcanoes and their fissure fields (paler shading) in the Snæfellsnes volcanic belt:'"`UNIQ--templatestyles-00000001-QINU`"' Snæfellsjökull '"`UNIQ--templatestyles-00000002-QINU`"' Helgrindur '"`UNIQ--templatestyles-00000003-QINU`"' Ljósufjöll Mouse over is enabled on clicking the map and this will allow identification of features (yellow) mentioned in the text on this page.'"`UNIQ--ref-00000004-QINU`"'
- Location: Iceland

Geology
- Mountain type: Fissure vents
- Last eruption: 960 CE ± 10 years

Ljósufjöll (Icelandic pronunciation: [ˈljouːsʏˌfjœtl̥]) is a fissure vent system and central volcano on the Snæfellsnes Peninsula in Iceland. The name derives from the central volcano and translates into English as "Mountains of the Light".

== Geography ==
The volcanic system has a length of about 90 km (56 mi) and a maximum width at its eastern end of about 20 km (12 mi). The north-western part of the Ljósufjöll volcanic system has hyaloclastite hills and lava flows about 3–6 km (1.9–3.7 mi) wide. This progresses into the ridge like central volcano with its highest peak of 1,063 m (3,488 ft). The fissure swarm widens to the south-east and extends towards the Haffjarðará river and the town of Bifröst at the eastern base of the peninsula.

== Geology ==
The volcanic system is part of the Snæfellsnes volcanic belt (zone). This is an intra-plate volcanic zone less than 3.3 million years old, erupting through 25–29 km (16–18 mi) of crust at Ljósufjöll. The belt has relatively low geothermal gradients for Iceland at about 40–60 °C/km (120–170 °F/mi) and erupts alkalic to transitional basalts, with the Ljósufjöll system tending to be less alkalotic.

The Ljósufjöll volcanic system's oldest rocks are about 780,000 years old. It contains cinder cones and is the only system on the peninsula that has erupted in recorded history, in 960 CE ± 10. This produced from a single crater a 13 km^{2} (5.0 sq mi) lava flow called Rauðhálsahraun [ˈrœyðˌhaulsaˌr̥œyːn], and a tephra scoria layer that covered about 50 km^{2} (19 sq mi). In this region of the system to the east, the younger basaltic formations often do not entirely cover the older Neogene basement rocks.

The central volcano in the system is highly silicic with the largest Quaternary rhyolitic outcrop in the Snæfellsnes volcanic belt, which causes a light coloration to the volcanoes rocks. The central volcano has erupted twice in the last 4000 years. The fissure swarm has produced about 17 basaltic lava flows during the Holocene with the largest covering 33 km^{2} (13 sq mi). The most studied eruption of the system is one that occurred about 4000 years ago, called the Berserkjahraun [ˈpɛrˌsɛr̥caˌr̥œyːn] eruption, near the north-west coast of the Snæfellsnes Peninsula. The four craters are in a west to east alignment and are known as Kothraunskúla [ˈkʰɔtˌr̥œynsˌkʰuːla], Smáhraunskúlur [ˈsmauːˌr̥œynsˌkʰuːlʏr̥], Gráakúla [ˈkrauːaˌkʰuːla] and Rauðakúla [ˈrœyːðaˌkʰuːla]. This must have had magma that evolved in two different storage zones, presumably one in the lower crust and one in the upper-mid-crust so as to be consistent with other findings in the Snæfellsnes volcanic belt. The studies done have included the Vatnafell [ˈvahtnaˌfɛtl̥] tuya, which is between the western portion of the definitely assigned Ljósufjöll volcanic system and the Helgrindur volcanic system and might belong to either system.

== Activity ==
Seismic activity increased at a depth of between 15 and 20 km (9.3 and 12.4 mi) near Grjótárvatn [ˈkrjouːtˌaurˌvahtn̥], which is within the area of the volcanic system, in late 2024. This could be due to magma accumulation at depth or intra-plate tectonic movement.

== See also ==
- Volcanism of Iceland
  - List of volcanic eruptions in Iceland
  - List of volcanoes in Iceland
