= Lóndrangar =

Pair of rock pinnacles in Iceland

Coordinates: 64°44′00″N 23°47′00″W

Londrangar view from Malarrif

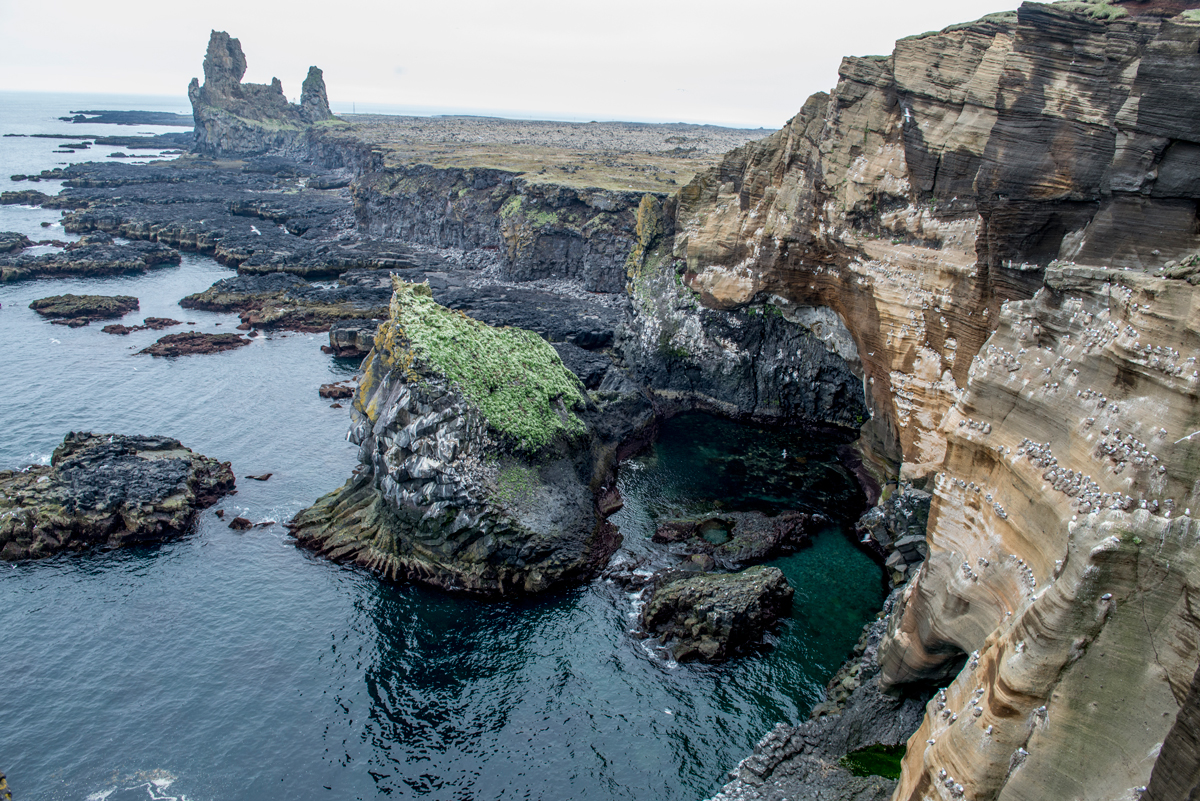
Londrangar Cliffs in Snaefellsness

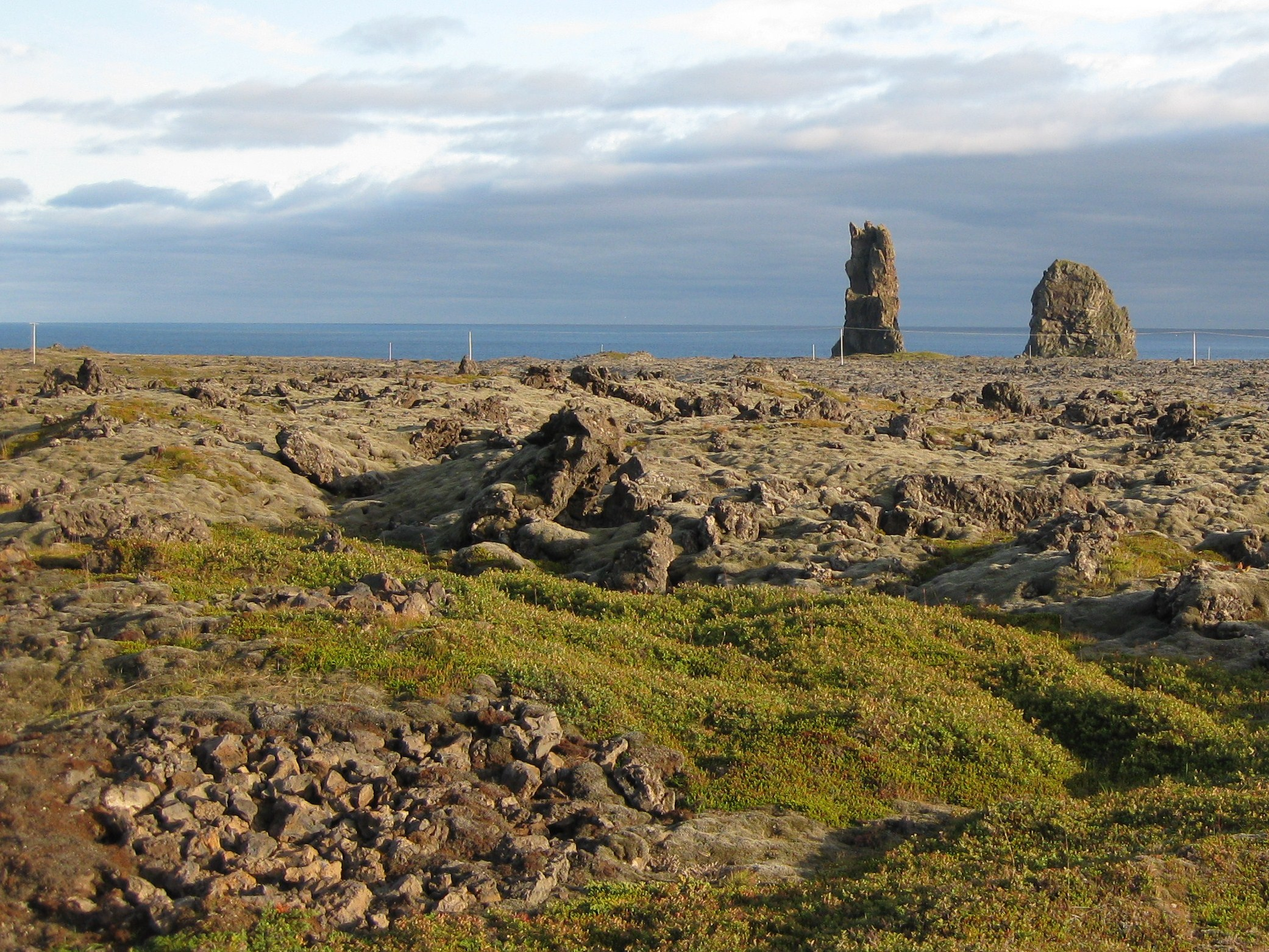
Lóndrangar, view from the road

The Lóndrangar (Icelandic pronunciation: [ˈlounˌtrauŋkar̥]) are a pair of rock pinnacles in Iceland. They are volcanic plugs of basalt, that have been hewn out from softer surrounding rock by erosion. At 75 and 61 m tall, they are a singular sight, rising above and outside the ocean front due east across from Malarrif [ˈmaːlarˌrɪːf] and some 10 km from Hellnar, on the southern coast of Snæfellsnes peninsula. History has it that the taller of the cliffs was ascended in 1735, while the smaller one was not climbed until 1938.

The Lóndrangar are remnants from a bigger crater which has mostly eroded away. It is reckoned that the rock in the slopes of nearby Svalþúfa [ˈsvalˌθuː(v)a] is an isolated part of the original rim around the crater itself, with the rest eroded away by the sea. There are many bird nest s in the steep slopes of the twin towers and birds which can be observed are black-legged kittiwake, common murre, puffin and northern fulmar. At one time the coastal area around Lóndrangar, Drangsvogur [ˈtrauŋsˌvɔːɣʏr̥], was used for the landing of fishing vessels with up to 12 fishing boats making use of it as a natural harbor.

== Legend ==
In the Hauksbók recension of the 13th-century Landnámabók, the two pinnacles now called Lóndrangar are referred to as the "Drangar rock towers". There, the settler Lón-Einarr is said to have encountered a troll seated on the stacks, whose beating of its feet against the water created great waves and who recited a verse describing how the giants of old once cast boulders into the sea to swamp ships.

== Sources ==
- West.is 14 July 2010
- Þorsteinn Jósepsson, Steindór Steindórsson, Páll Líndal; Landið þitt Ísland, L-R Örn og Örlygur 1982
