= Helgrindur =

Mountain in Iceland

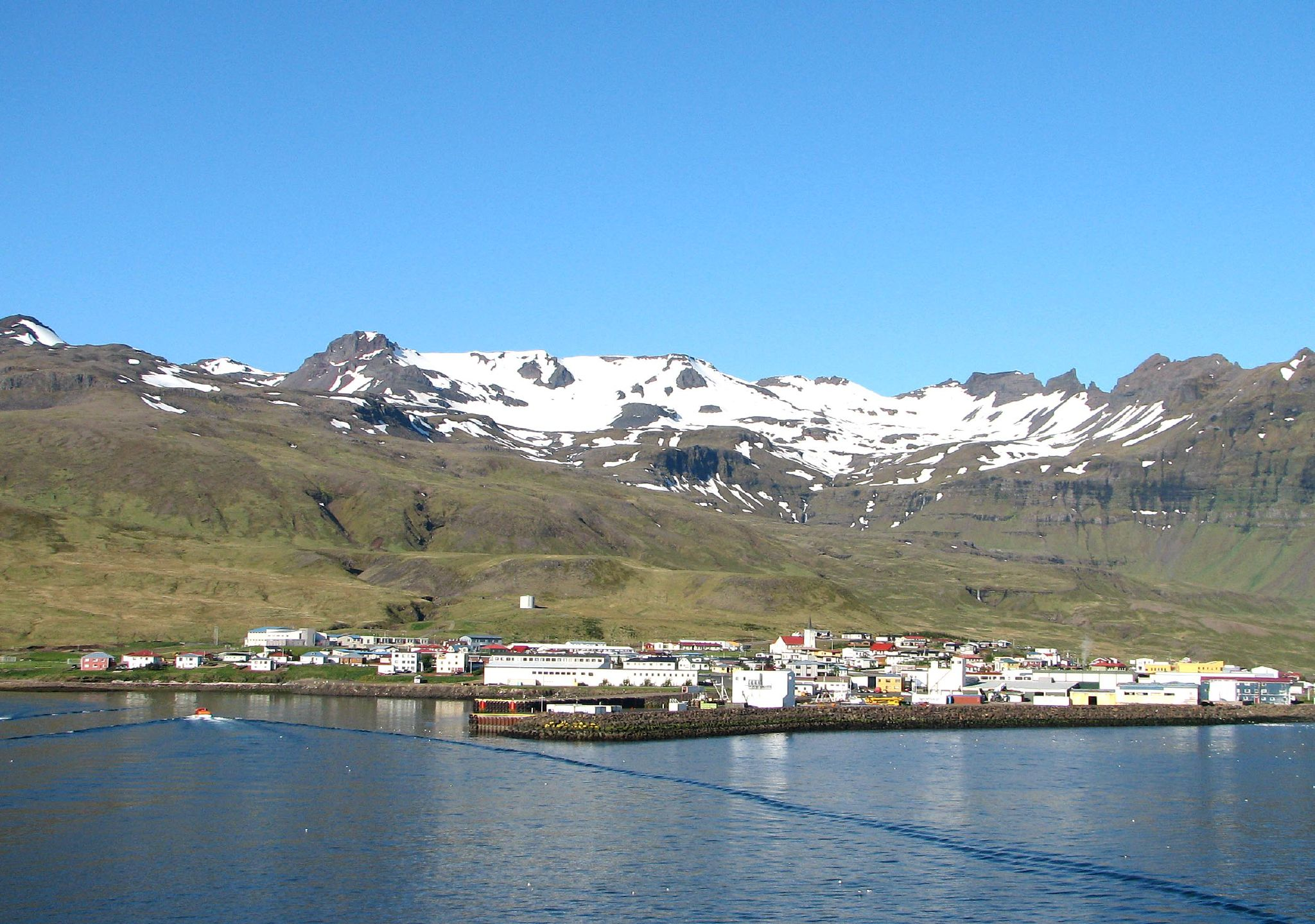
- Helgrindur behind Grundarfjörður towards the south

Highest point
- Elevation: 988 m (3,241 ft)
- Coordinates: 64°52′N 23°18′W

Dimensions
- Length: 30 km (19 mi)
- Width: 2–3 km (1.2–1.9 mi)

Geography
- Location within Iceland
- Approximate map of central volcanoes and their fissure fields (paler shading) in the Snæfellsnes volcanic belt: Snæfellsjökull Helgrindur Ljósufjöll Mouse over is enabled on clicking the map which also shows some features (yellow) mentioned in the text on the page.
- Location: Snæfellsnes peninsula, western Iceland

Geology
- Mountain type: Pyroclastic cone(s)
- Last eruption: Holocene

Helgrindur (Icelandic pronunciation: [ˈhɛlˌkrɪntʏr̥], also known as Lýsuskarð, Lysuhóll or Lysukard) is a volcanic mountain range or massif in the middle of the Snæfellsnes peninsula that provides a backdrop to the port of Grundarfjörður. The volcano can be regarded as potentially active, with a risk of lava flows and much more rarely explosive tephra eruptions. The range with its prominent peaks, of Tröllkerling at 891 m (2,923 ft) in its south-east, Böðvarskúla at 988 m (3,241 ft) and Kaldnasaborgir (Kaldnasi) in its north-west at 986 m (3,235 ft) is popular with hikers or mountaineers.

== Geography ==
The 2–3 km (1.2–1.9 mi) wide range, is in the middle of the Snæfellsnes peninsula and thus divides the northern large bay of Breiðafjörður from the southern bay of Faxaflói. Reykjavík is about 105 km (65 mi) to the range's south across Faxaflói. The weather systems in the two large bays are often quite different and the stormy winds across the range are quite notorious and can be heard sometimes at sea level.

== Geology ==
The range is part of the Snæfellsnes volcanic belt that extends from the prominent stratovolcano Snæfellsjökull and its volcanic system, to the Helgrindur volcanic system and then on via Vatnafell, a tuya, to the Ljósufjöll volcanic system in an east to west lineament. It is not currently known if Vatnafell is part of the Helgrindur volcanic system. The rocks tend to be alkaline hyaloclastite basalt or picrite basalt, however a central rhyolite formation is known. In total length there is a 30 km (19 mi) fissure swarm that extends from the south-east into the sea at its north-west. The most recent two eruptions were basaltic and must have occurred more than 1100 years ago. They are in the mid south portion of the volcanic system. The oldest rock from the system itself are 1.4 million years old, and have been emplaced over a 10 to 7 million year old extinct rift zone basaltic basement.

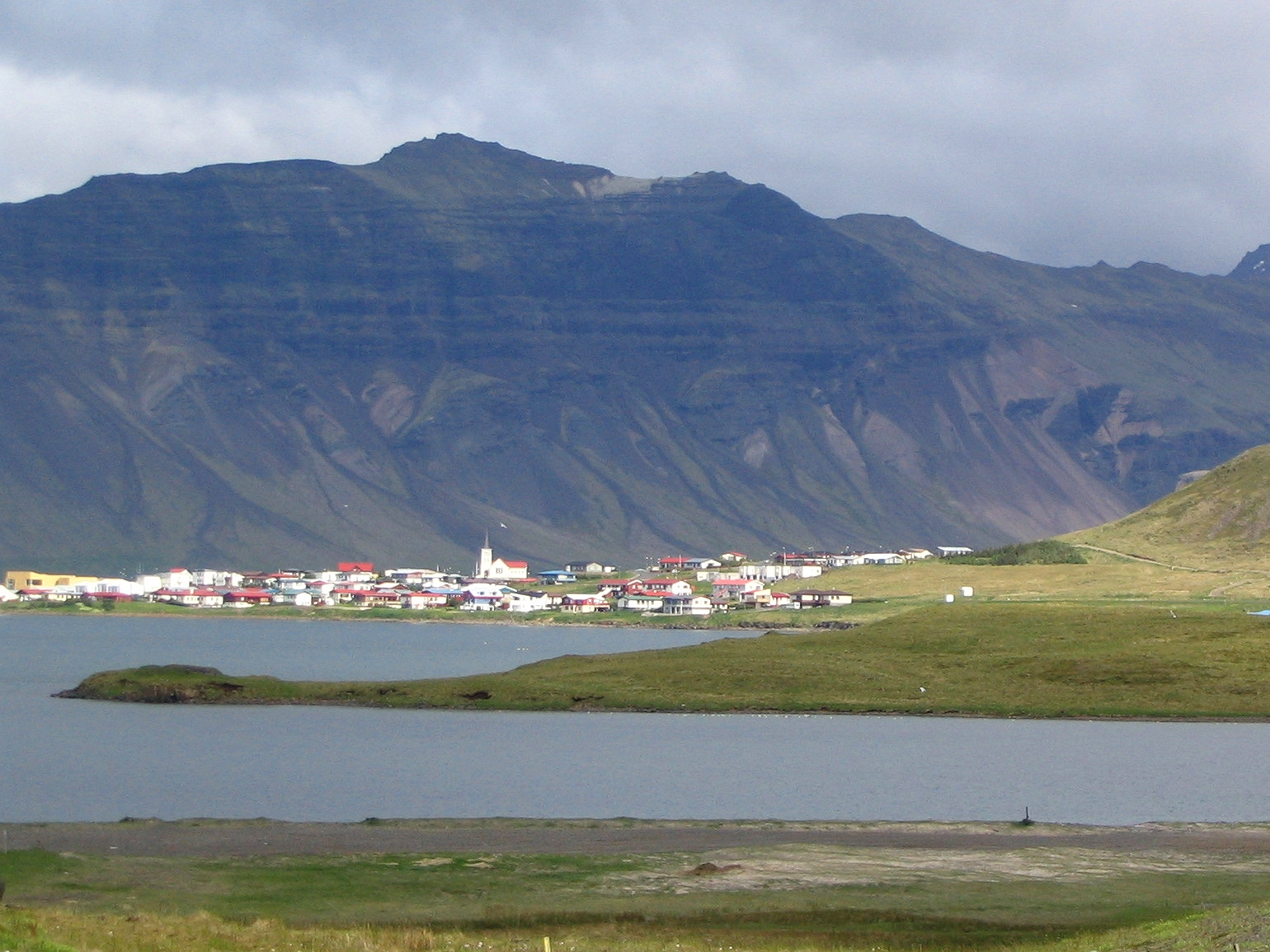
Grundarfjörur with parts of the Helgrindur mountain range in the background

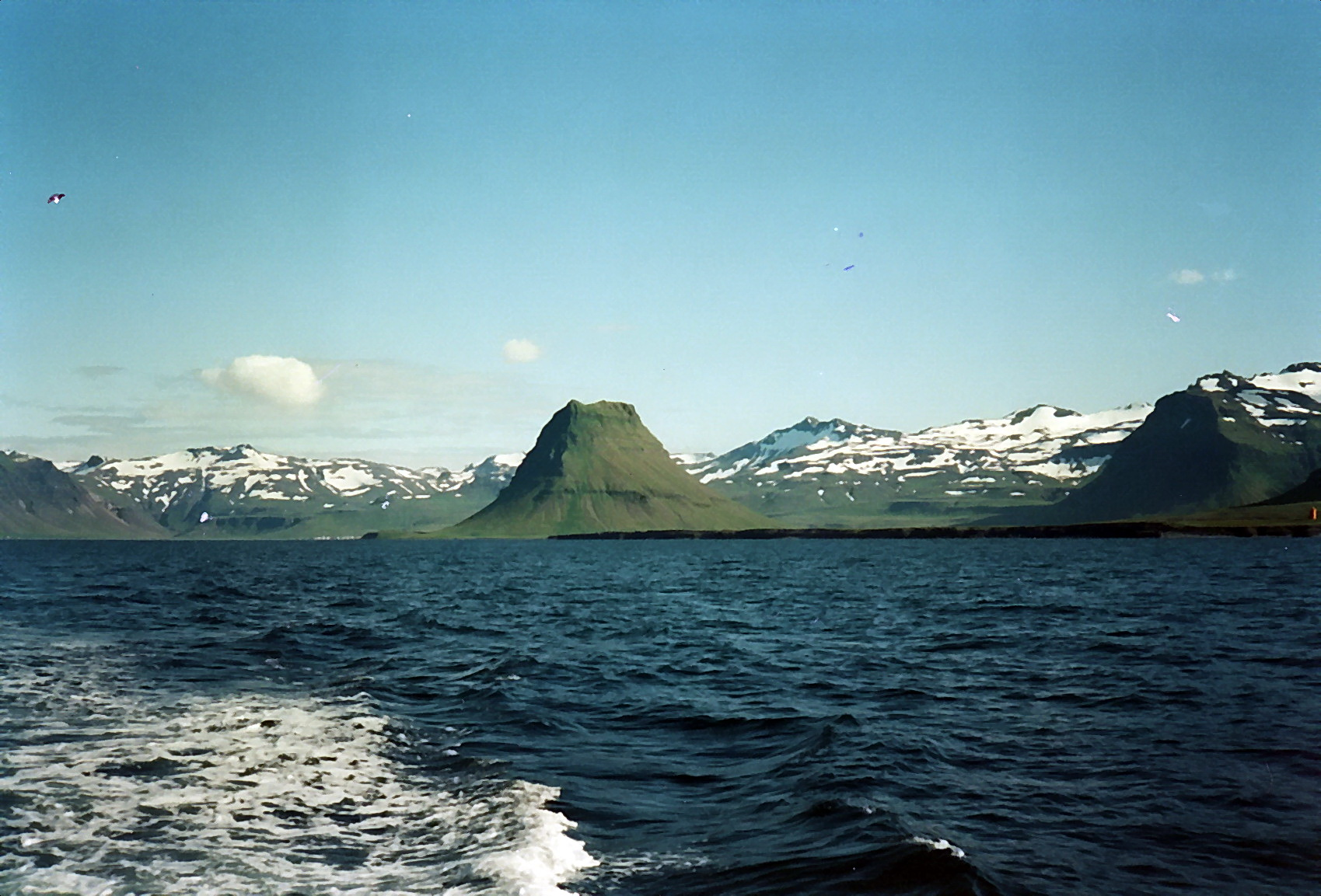
The mountain range from the Breiðafjörður towards the south-east

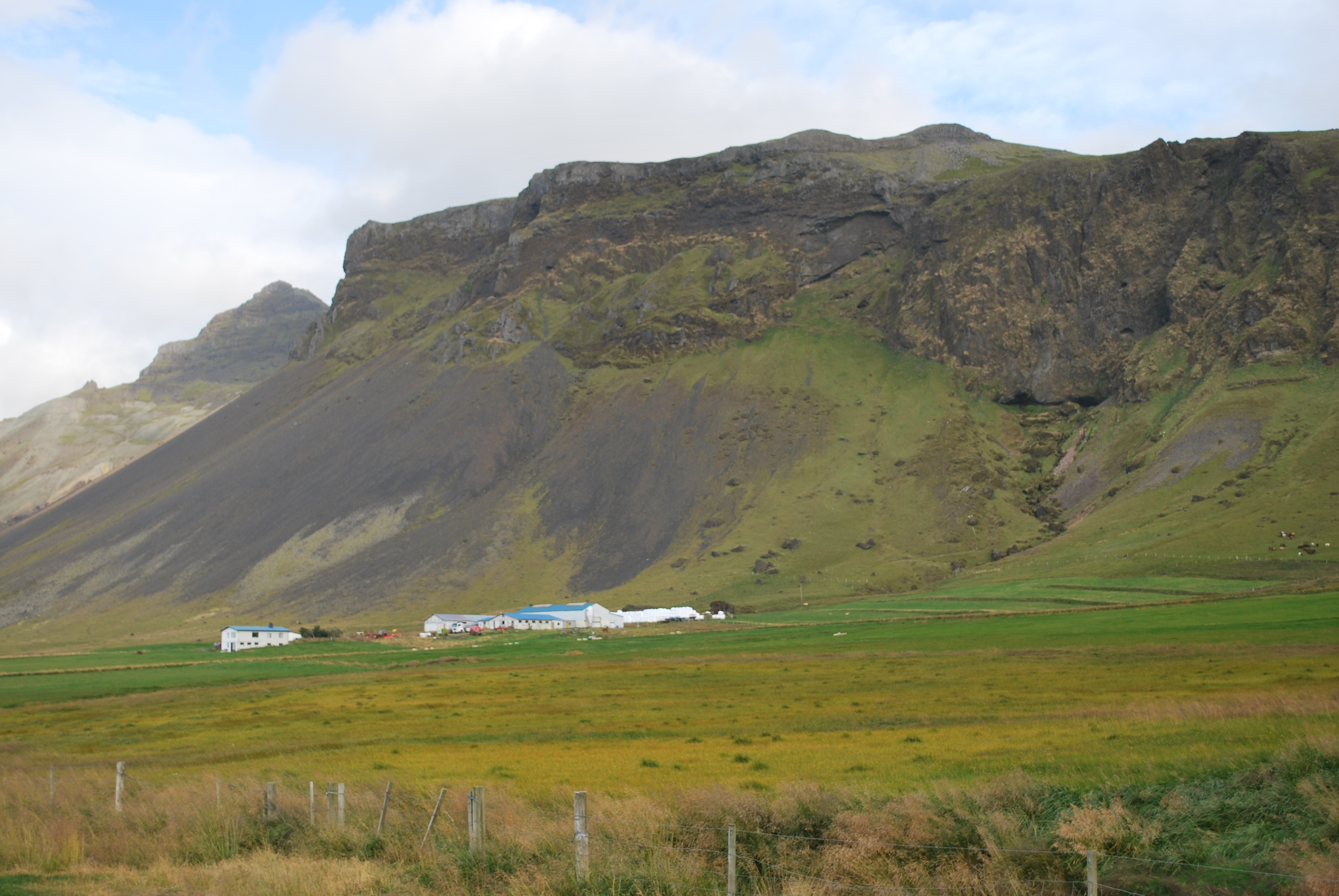
Southern Helgrindur massif

== See also ==
- Geology of Iceland
- Volcanism of Iceland
  - List of volcanoes in Iceland
