= Hellnar =

- Village
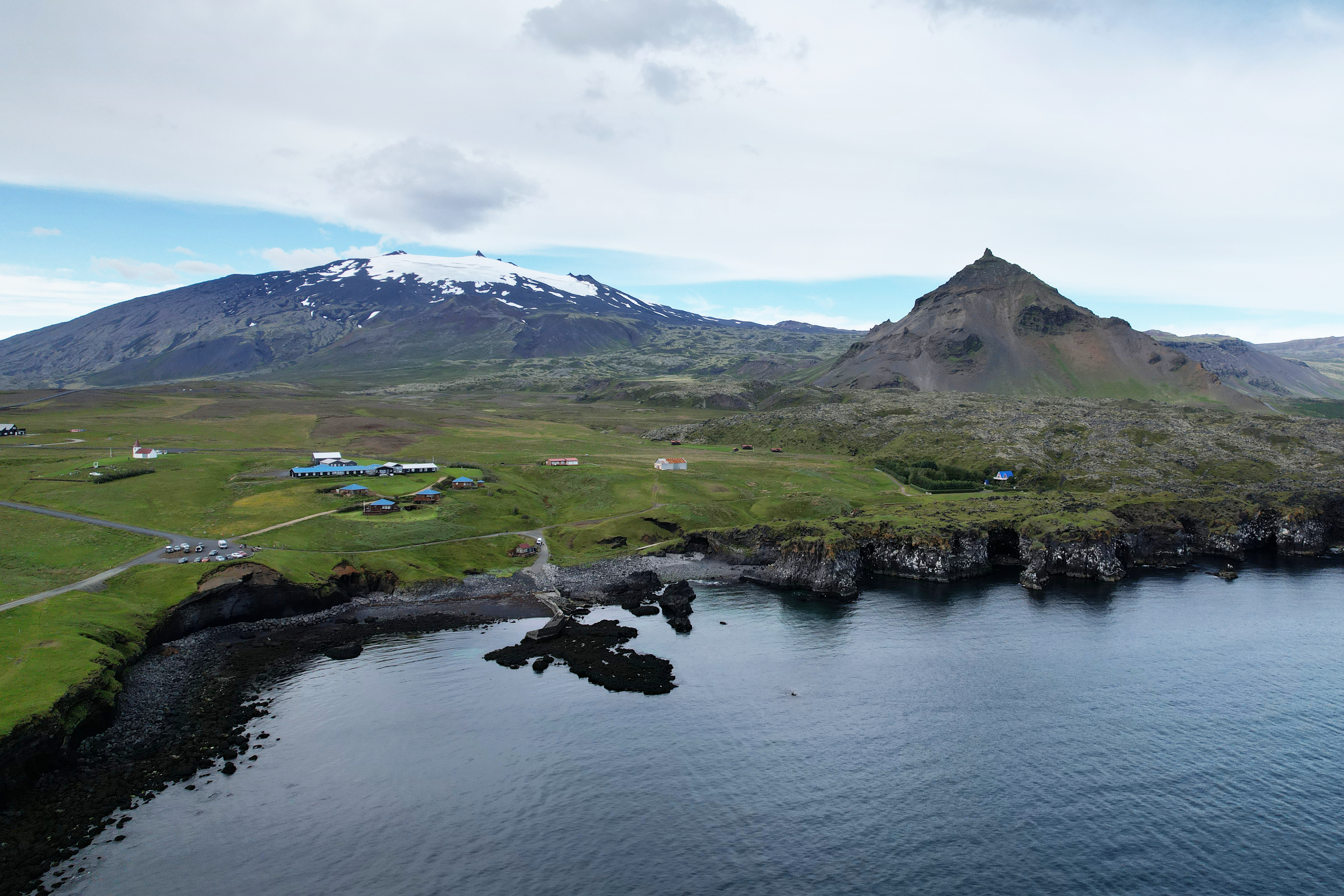
- Hellnar with Snæfellsjökull in the background

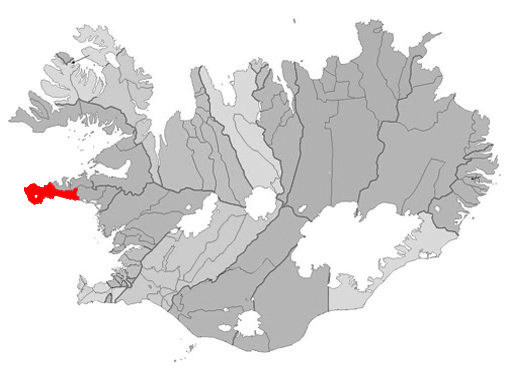
- Location of the Municipality of Snæfellsbær

- Location of Hellnar in Iceland
- Coordinates: 64°45′N 23°39′W
- Country: Iceland
- Constituency: Northwest Constituency
- Region: Western Region
- Municipality: Snæfellsbær
- Time zone: UTC+0 (GMT)

Hellnar (Icelandic pronunciation: [ˈhɛtlnar̥]) is an ancient fishing village, a cluster of old houses and buildings situated close to Arnarstapi on the westernmost part of the Snæfellsnes peninsula, Iceland.

Although Hellnar village used to be a major port of call for fishing vessels and the largest and busiest centre of fishing and fishing vessels in Snæfellsnes, there were also a few farms in and around Hellnar village along with quite a few semi-permanent and short-stay living quarters for seamen and the migrating workforce. Hellnar village can in all probability trace its function as a major port of call back to the Middle Ages, and the oldest written source of it being describes as a fishing port dates back to 1560.

In earlier times, Hellnar would have been in relatively large part fisheries-related farms and buildings, and in the national census of 1703, some 194 individuals were registered as being inhabitants of Hellnar. This same year the buildings and farms of Hellnar are listed as numbering 38 altogether, of which 7 farms are listed as agricultural farms, 11 as having fisheries and fisheries-related functions, and 20 as listed as being semi-permanent or short-stay lodgings for the migrating work force and displaced persons.

On the beach some spectacular rock formations are to be seen, one of which is a protruding cliff called Valasnös, which reaches across the ocean front and into the sea. Tunneling into this cliff there is a cave known for colorful changes of lighting and shades that vary in tune with the natural light and the movements of the sea.

== Gallery ==
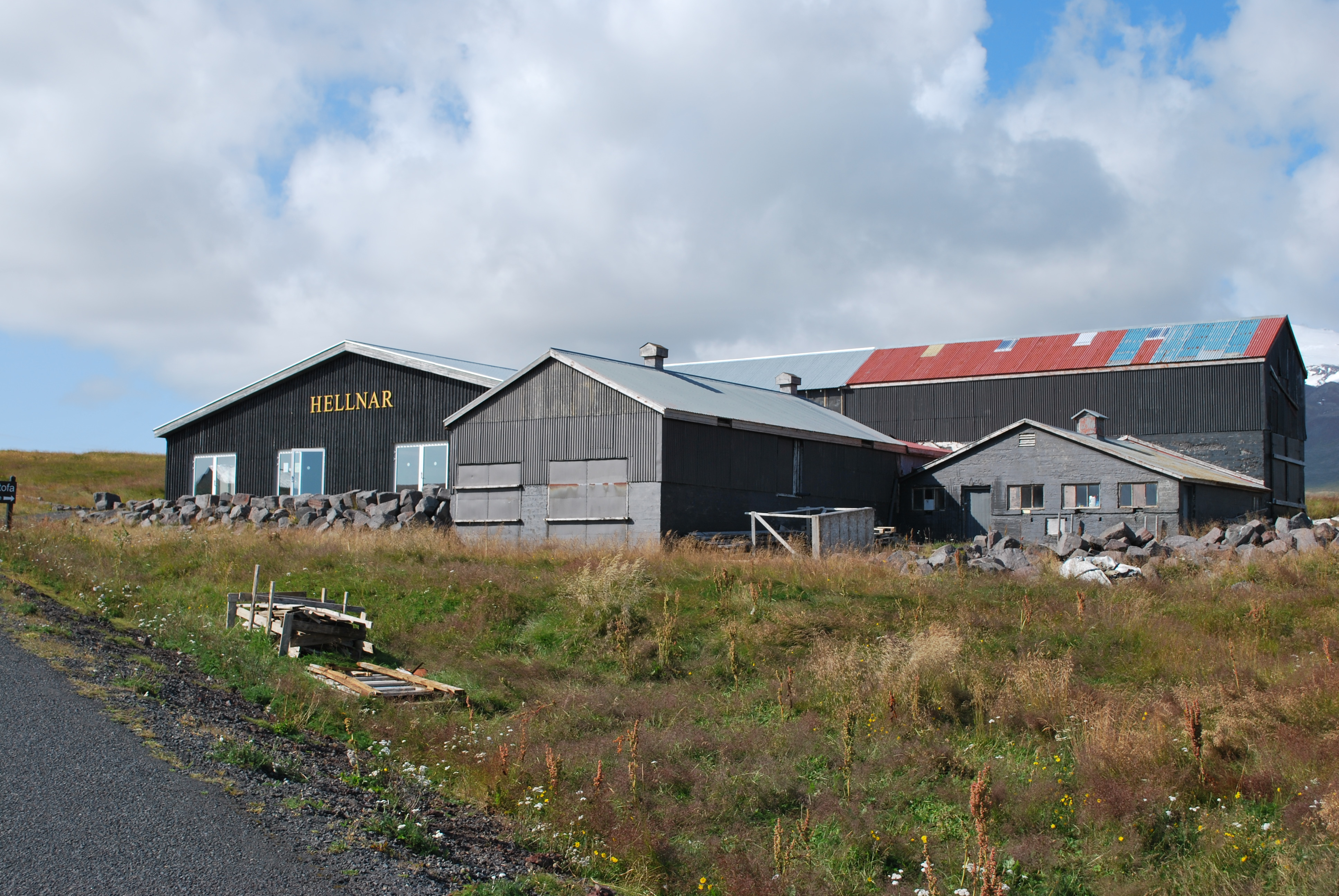
Local museum in Hellnar

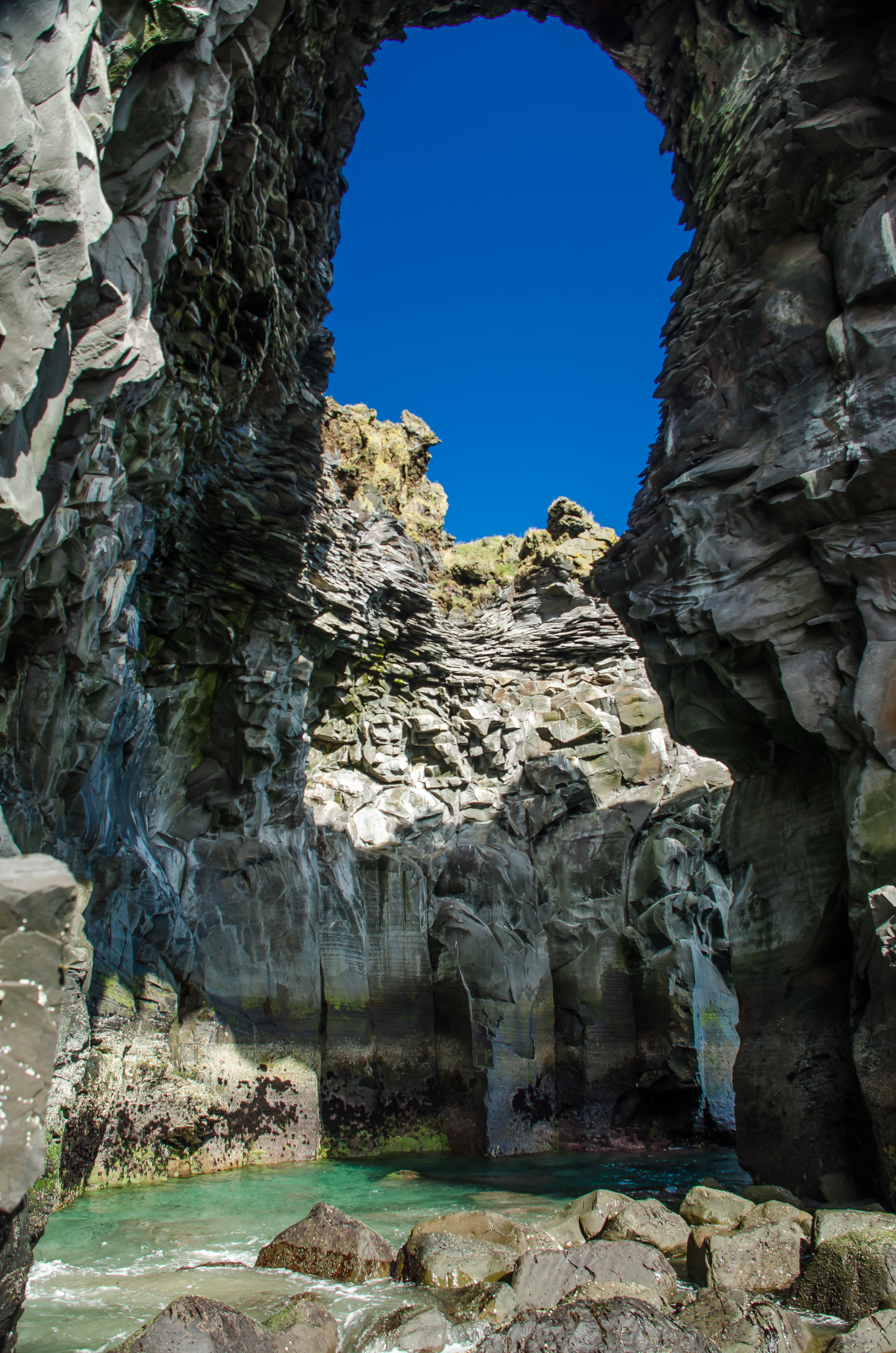
Baðstofa rock formation

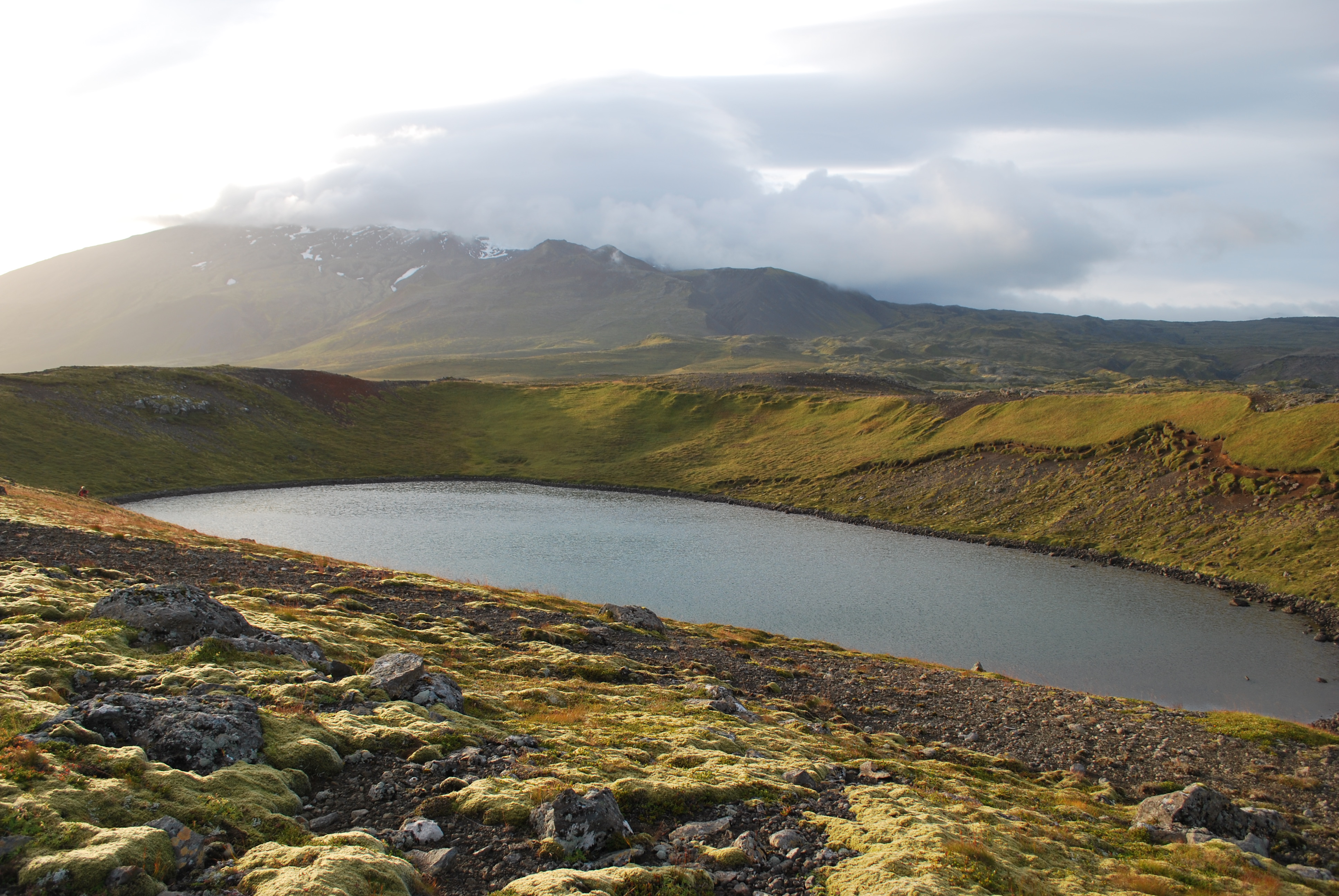
Bardarlaug crater lake north of the village
