= Rauðfeldsgjá =

Ravine in Iceland

Coordinates: 64.7990026252°N 23.650016427°W

Rauðfeldsgjá after entering into the "main hall"

Rauðfeldsgjá (Icelandic pronunciation: [ˈrœyðˌfɛl(t)sˌcauː], lit. 'Rauðfeldur's Ravine') is a ravine in Snæfellsnes in Iceland.

== Name ==
The ravine is mentioned in the Icelandic saga, Bárðar saga Snæfellsáss, which was written around 600 years ago about events that occurred about 12 centuries ago. In the story, Bárður, in anger over the loss of his daughter, throws the two brothers Rauðfeldur and Sölvi off the cliff and into the ravine.
