= Búðir =

- Hamlet
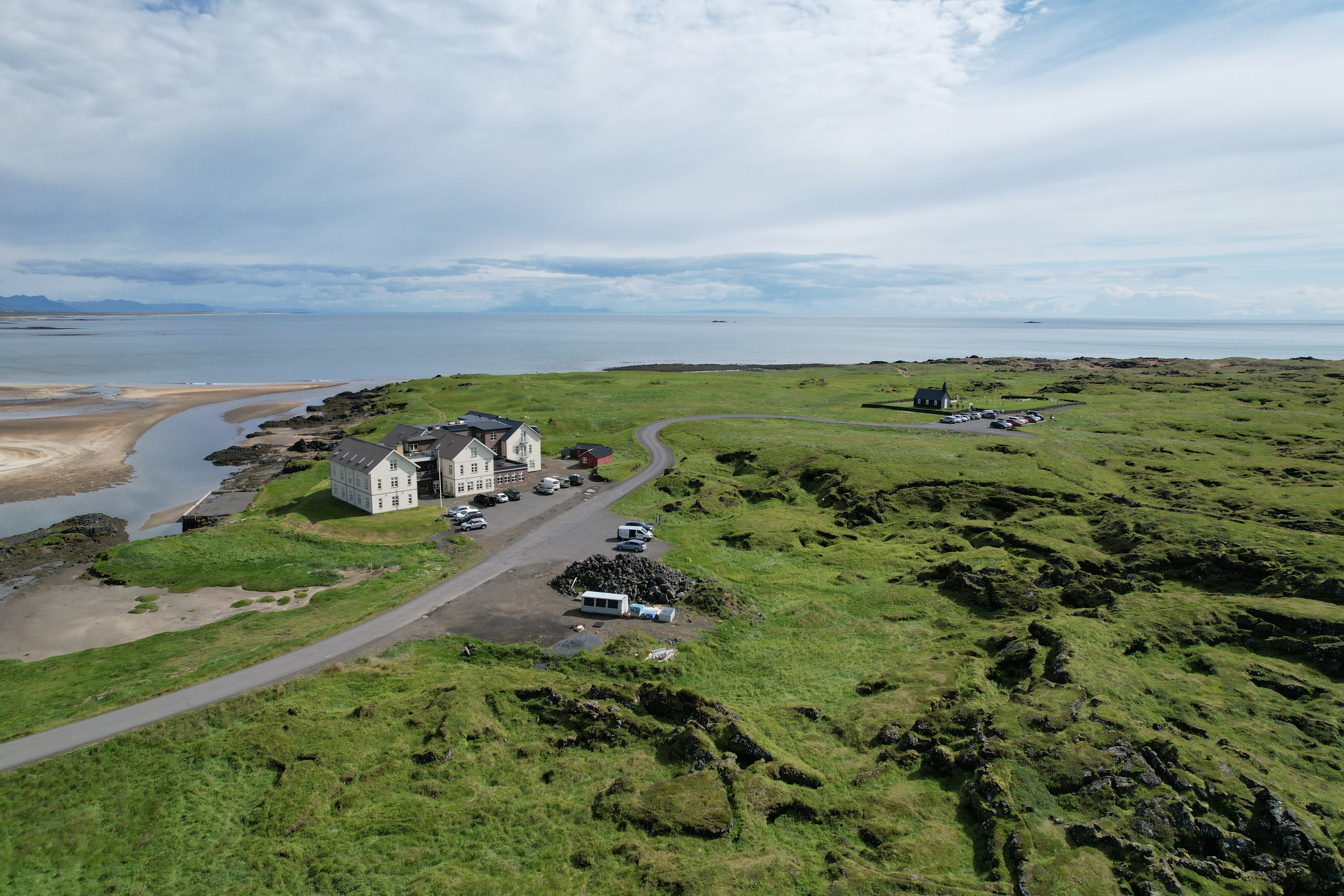
- Búðir in 2024

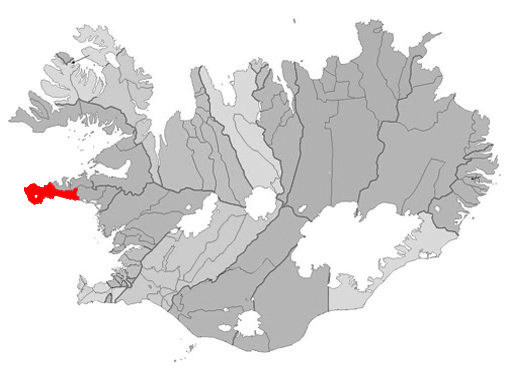
- Location of the Municipality of Snæfellsbær

- Location of Búðir in Iceland
- Coordinates: 64°50′N 23°33′W
- Country: Iceland
- Constituency: Northwest Constituency
- Region: Western Region
- Municipality: Snæfellsbær
- Time zone: UTC+0 (GMT)

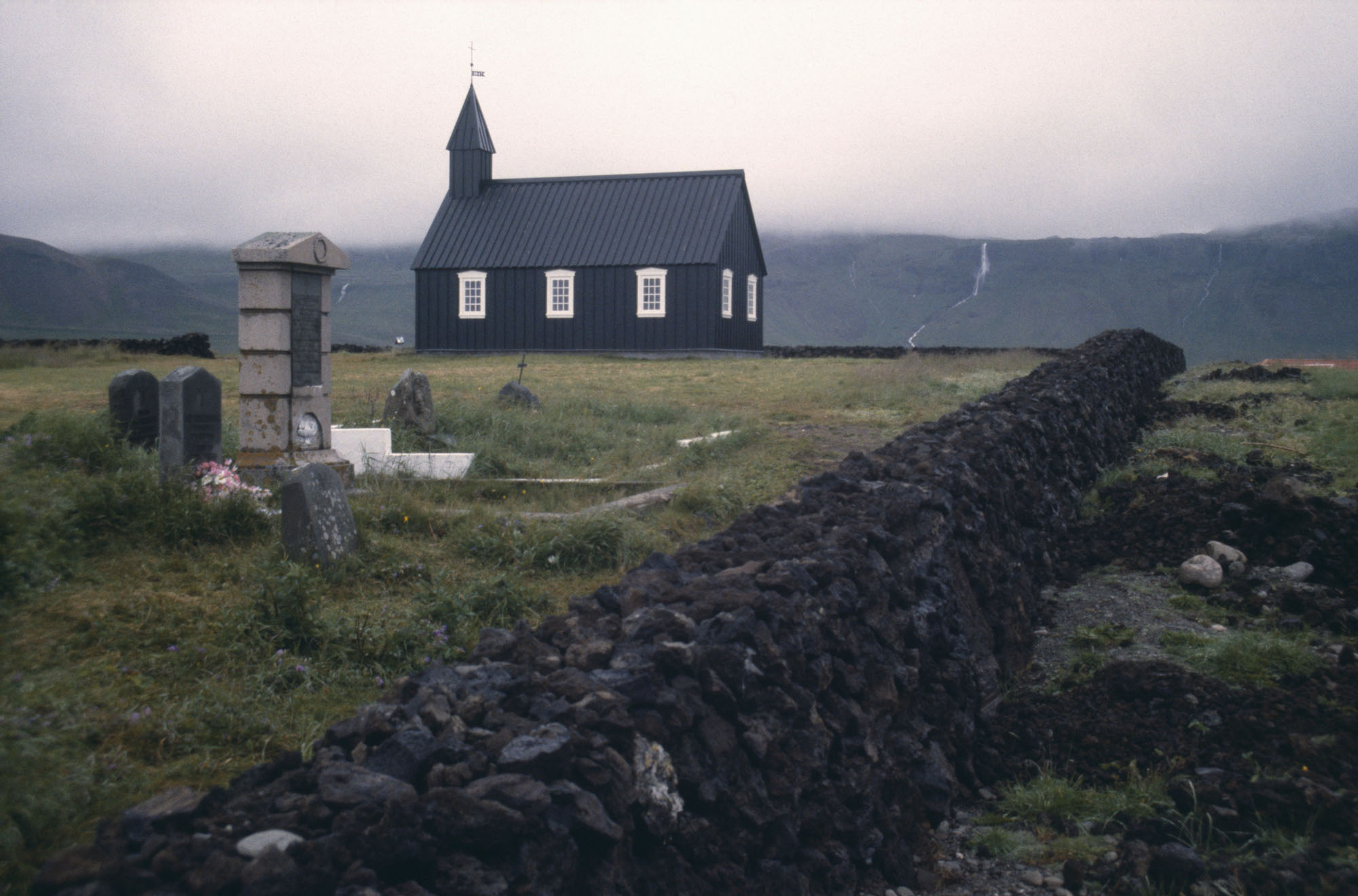
Church near Búðir, August 1989

Búðir (Icelandic pronunciation: [ˈpuːðɪr̥]; also transliterated Búdir) is a small hamlet in Búðahraun lava fields in Staðarsveit, which is in the western region of Iceland, on the westernmost tip of the Snaefellsnes peninsula where Hraunhafnará falls to the sea, the original old name of Búðir having been Hraunhöfn.

The hamlet belongs to Snæfellsbær, a municipality that has its administrative centre in the town of Ólafsvík.

== Overview ==
Búðir is a small hamlet; the home of popular country inn and restaurant, Hotel Búðir and a small medieval church. A fire claimed the restaurant and Hótel Búðir burned down on 21 February 2001, however they were reconstructed in the original style.

Commercial activity began at Búðir shortly after Iceland was settled. Originally the main function of the hamlet was that to act as a commercial and trade hub for Snæfellsnes and the surrounding west coast region, during the Danish occupation. Today the small hamlet is a center of attraction in Snæfellsnes for tourism.

== Sources ==
- Vesturland.is, Afþreying og staðir 14 júlí 2010
- Þorsteinn Jósepsson, Steindór Steindórsson, Páll Líndal, Landið þitt Ísland, H-K, Örn og Örlygur, 1982
