= Snæfellsjökull =

Stratovolcano in Iceland

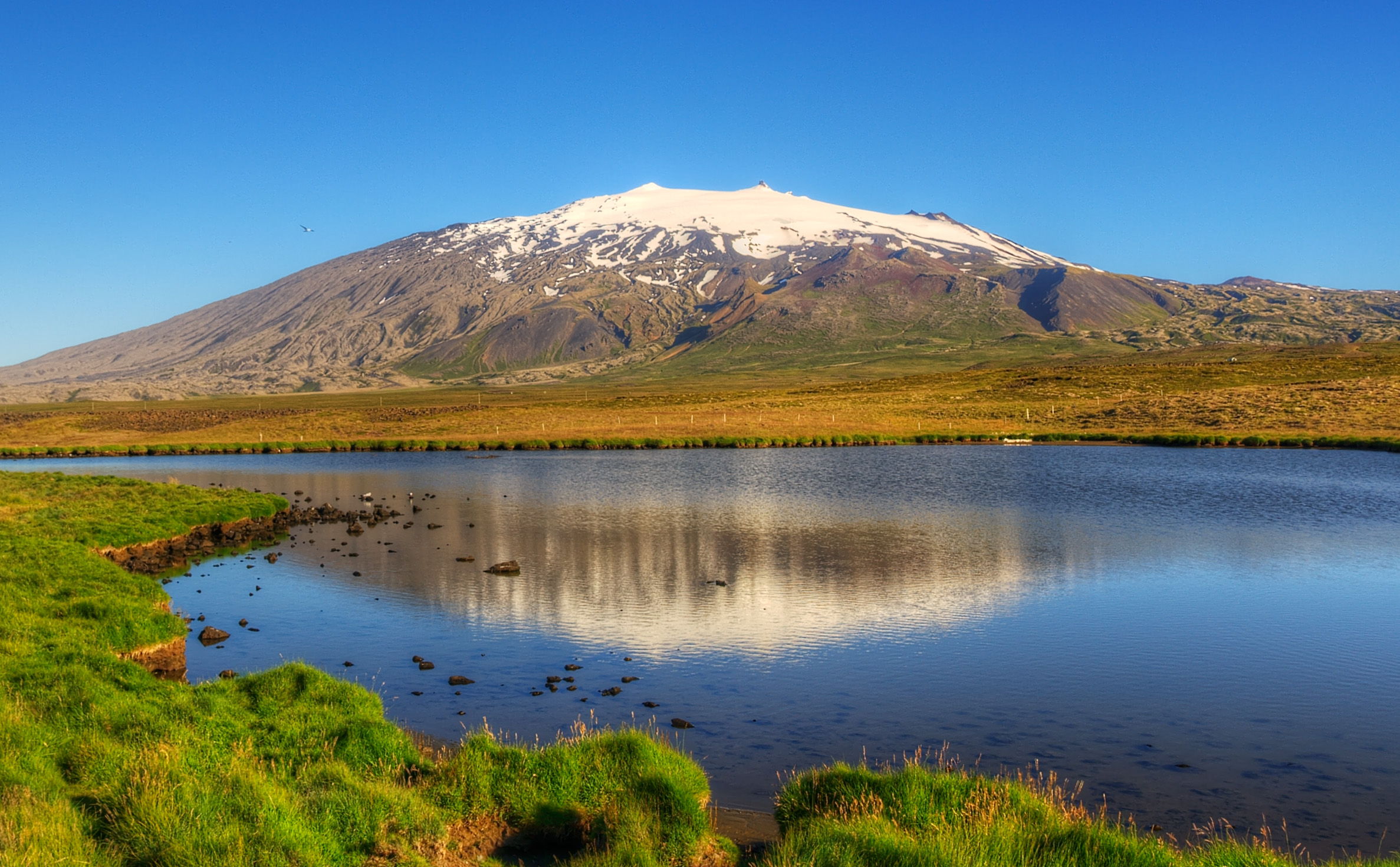
- Snæfellsjökull in the morning

Highest point
- Elevation: 1,446 m (4,744 ft)
- Prominence: >1,200 m
- Coordinates: 64°48′N 23°47′W

Geography
- Location within Iceland
- Approximate map of central volcanoes and their fissure fields (paler shading) in the Snæfellsnes volcanic belt: Snæfellsjökull Helgrindur Ljósufjöll Mouse over is enabled on clicking the map which also shows the location of some features (yellow) mentioned in the article text.
- Location: Snæfellsnes peninsula, western Iceland

Geology
- Mountain type: Stratovolcano
- Last eruption: 200 CE (Note: For the most recent major eruption the most accurate carbon dating uncorrected age is 1855±25 BP on tephra from a marine sediment core which is corrected to 1775±45 BP bracketing the about 1800 figure and the 200 CE figure used in the article, and implying an inaccuracy of about 50 years in these figures to the careful reader. The reasoning behind this is that corrected radiocarbon ages should be used where ever possible as these relate to actual dates. However there are other determinations on other samples from what might be an eruptive sequence in a volcanic system with wider error. Corrections to Icelandic radiocarbon ages published prior to 2002 are inaccurate. With regard to another eruption date given the uncorrected radiocarbon date is 3960±100 BP corrected to 3960±130 BP. Accordingly for the most recent eruption sequence a date of about 200 CE is used in the article without the error in the reference range or its original source stated and without a correction to 175 CE as would normally be done. The date of last eruption is slightly more recent than this and such dating could imply greater accuracy to last eruption time than is the case. The range of dates in the literature might also reflect some out of date sources. At least 20 Holocene eruptions have occurred, and it was noted when this ambiguity became apparent that the source for date used for the original article noted only about half of these and its most recent source was 2002.)

Snæfellsjökull (Icelandic pronunciation: [ˈs(t)naiːˌfɛlsˌjœːkʏtl̥], snow-fell glacier) is a 700,000-year-old glacier-capped stratovolcano in western Iceland. It is situated on the westernmost part of the Snæfellsnes peninsula. Sometimes it may be seen from the city of Reykjavík over Faxa Bay, at a distance of 120 km (75 mi).

The mountain is one of the most famous sites of Iceland, primarily due to the novel Journey to the Center of the Earth (1864) by Jules Verne, in which the protagonists find the entrance to a passage leading to the center of the Earth on Snæfellsjökull.

The mountain is part of Snæfellsjökull National Park (Icelandic: Þjóðgarðurinn Snæfellsjökull).

Snæfellsjökull was visible from an extreme distance due to an arctic mirage on 17 July 1939. Captain Robert Bartlett of the Effie M. Morrissey sighted Snæfellsjökull from a position some 536 to 560 kilometres (289–302 nmi) distant.

In August 2012, the summit was ice-free for the first time in recorded history. The icecap area had been 16 km^{2} (6.2 sq mi) in 1946, 14 km^{2} (5.4 sq mi) in 1999 reducing to 10–11 km^{2} (3.9–4.2 sq mi) in 2008.

== Geology ==
The stratovolcano, which is the only large central volcano in that part of Iceland, has many pyroclastic cones on its flanks. Upper-flank craters produced intermediate to felsic materials. Several Holocene eruptions have originated from the summit crater and have produced felsic material, with pumice from the two most recent major eruptions being alkaline trachyte trending in composition close to rhyolite. Lower-flank craters have produced basaltic lava flows with classic basalt composition. The latest flank eruption was of 0.11 km^{3} (0.026 cu mi) of basaltic material in the 4.5 km^{2} (1.7 sq mi) Væjuhraun lava flow; it occurred shortly after the last central volcano eruption. This main eruption had been explosive and originated from the summit crater. It is dated to about 200 CE, and was also associated with the eruption of viscous lava that covered 30 km^{2} (12 sq mi). In total, three large, perhaps up to VEI 4 Plinian rhyolitic (Note: The term rhyolite is used in multiple sources, but is not always technically accurate, given the trachyte described in whole rock, and that analysis of 28 Sn-1 (1775±45 cor. BP eruption) tephra samples gives a range of SiO_{2} from 63% to 71% so that the majority of samples from this eruption are trachyte by the Le Bas et al. 1986 classification. . It might be more accurate for the major eruption rocks of Sn-1 and Sn-2 to be termed as towards the alkaline rhyolite part of the tholeiitic magma series.) eruptions have occurred during the Holocene producing tephra. (Note: Other sources suggest unknown, or VEI 2 or less) These occurred about 8500, 4000 and 1800 years ago.

Snæfellsjökull is also associated with a fissure field that last erupted to the west forming the Væjuhraun lava flow as already mentioned. To the east of Snæfellsjökull this fissure field last erupted between 8,000 and 5,000 years ago. This eruption formed the 18 km^{2} (6.9 sq mi) Búðahraun lava field from the crater Búðaklettur, south-west of Búðir. This is part of the Snæfellsjökull volcanic system, which in turn is part of the Snæfellsnes volcanic belt (Snæfellsnes volcanic zone). This is an area of renewed intra-plate volcanism in the North American Plate, with rocks no older locally than 800,000 years, that overlay an extinct rift zone that produced the crustal basement tholeiitic flood basalts of the Snæfellsnes peninsula, which are more than 5 million years old.

=== Hazards ===
The Snæfellsjökull volcanic system has the potential for lava flows, explosive tephra eruptions (affecting air traffic during a major rhyolitic eruption), tsunami generation (perhaps one flank collapse has occurred historically) and glacial outburst floods (jökulhlaup).

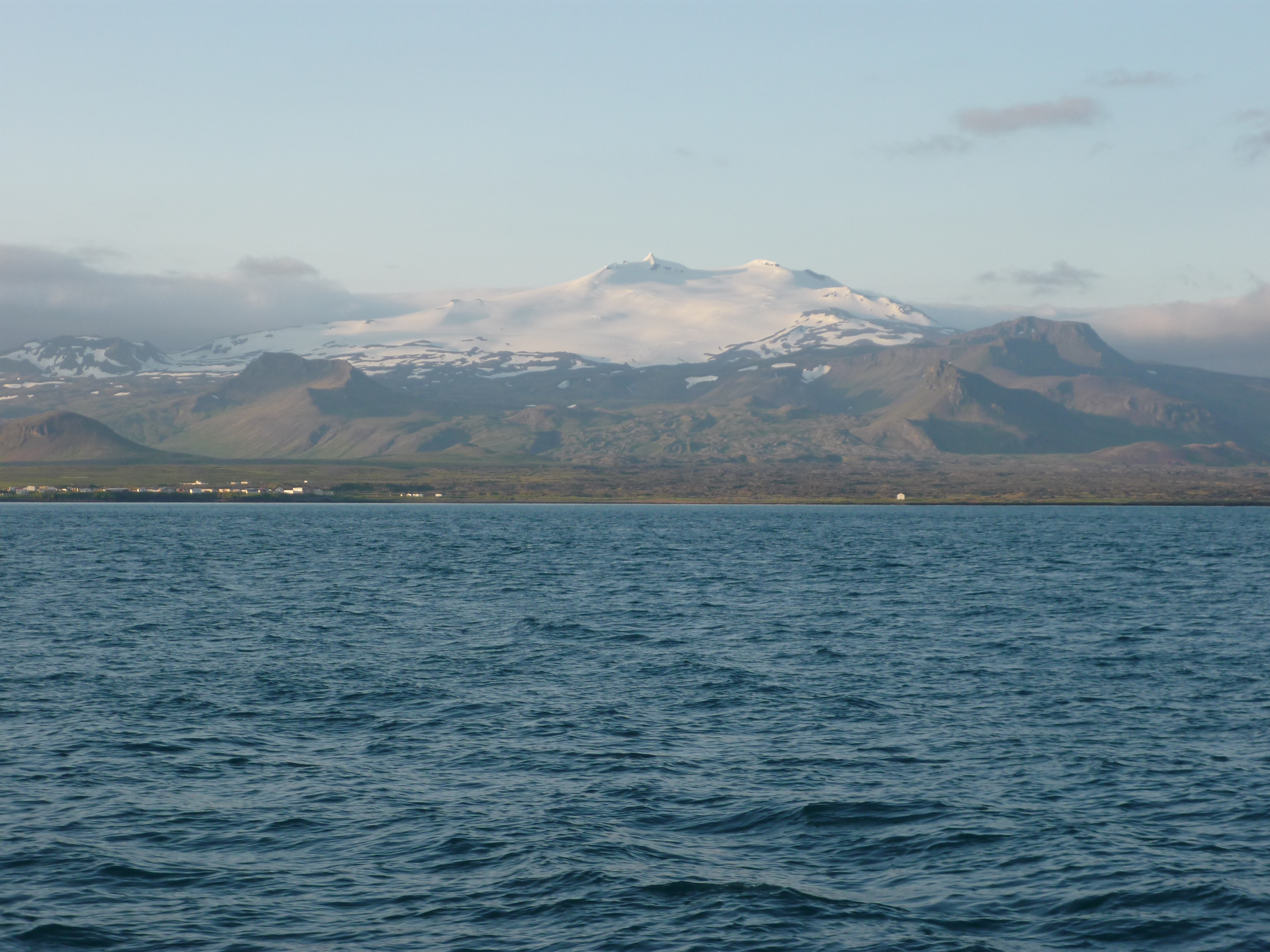
Snæfellsjökull from the sea

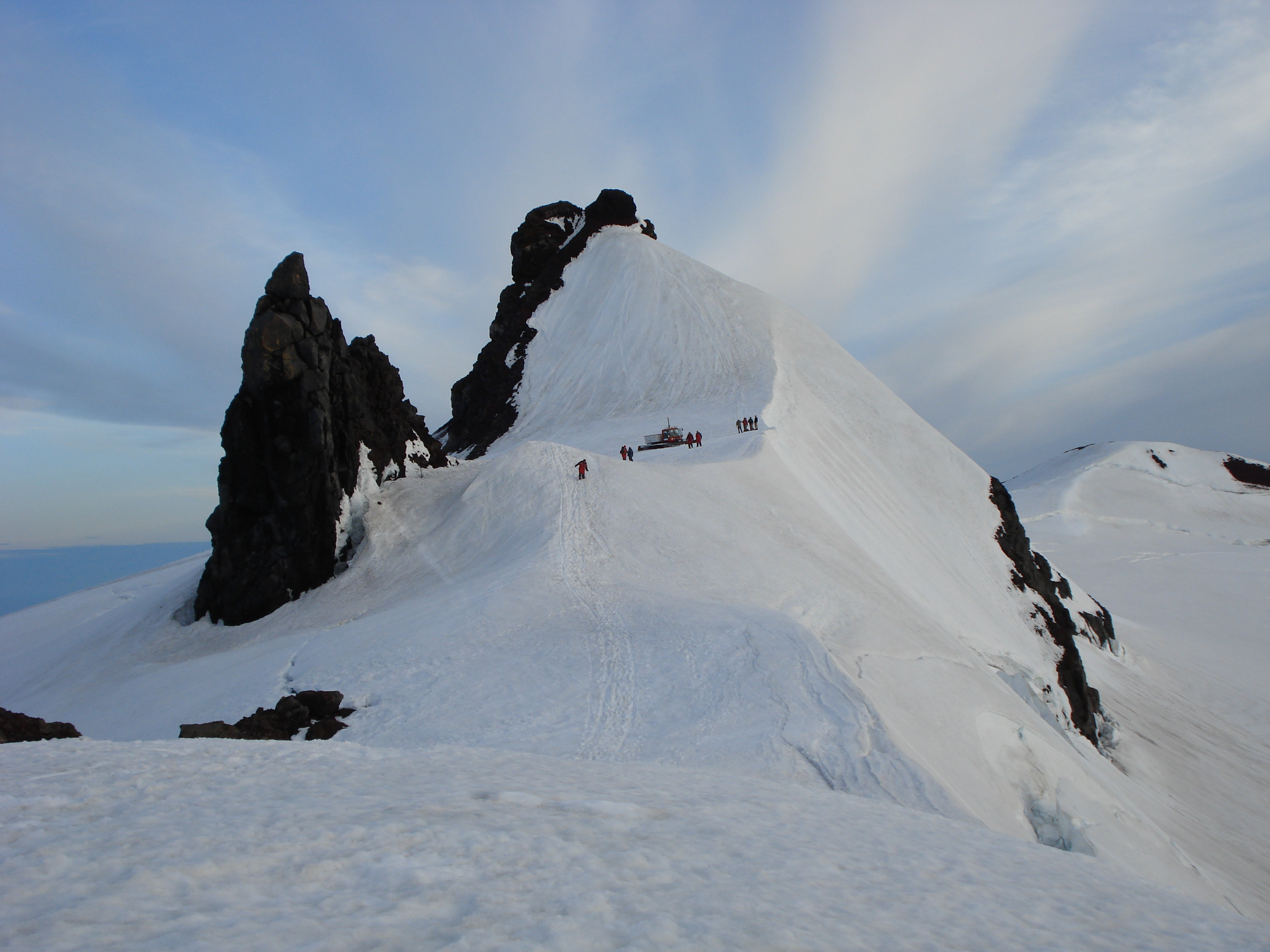
Volcanic plugs at the summit

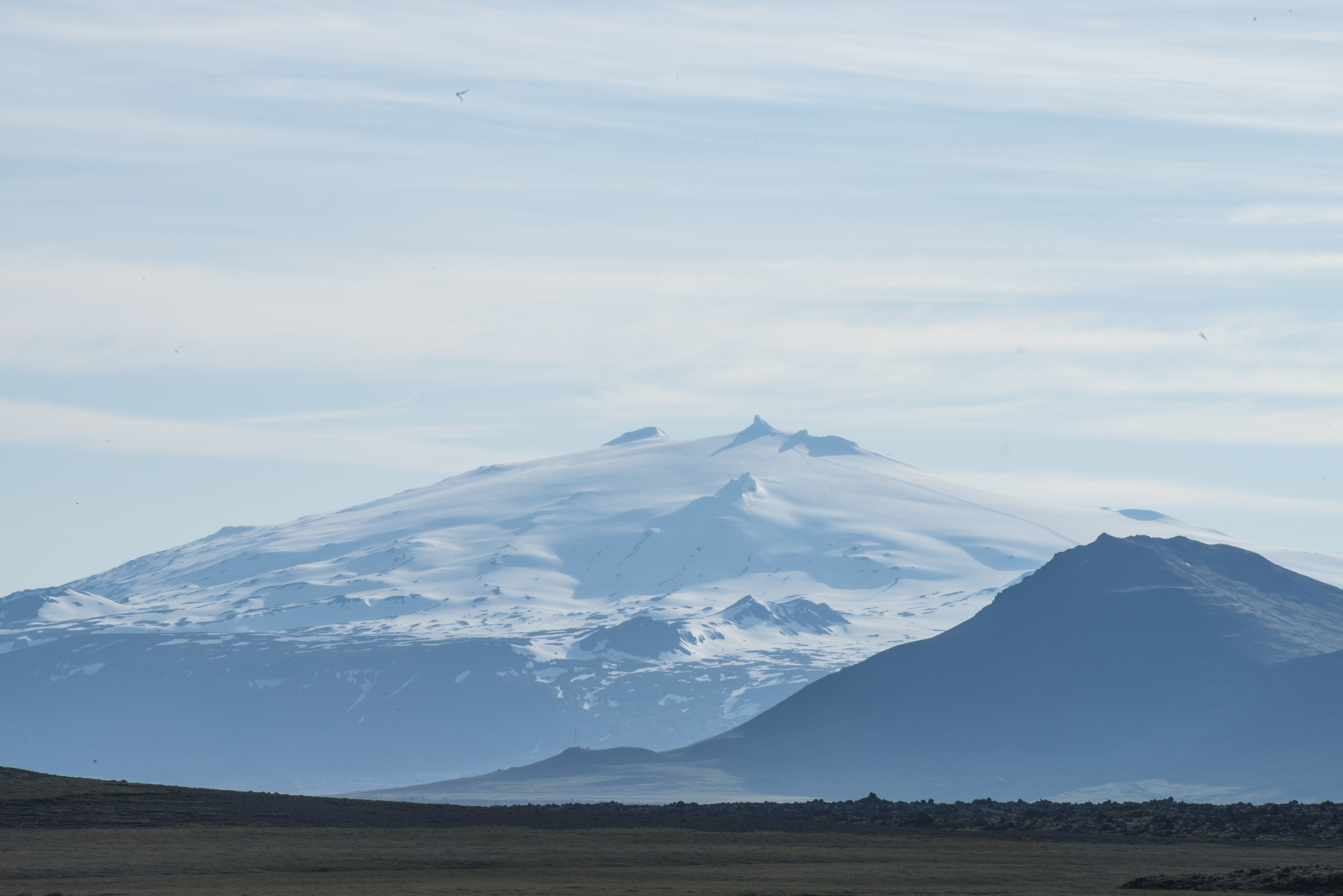
Snæfellsjökull Mountain

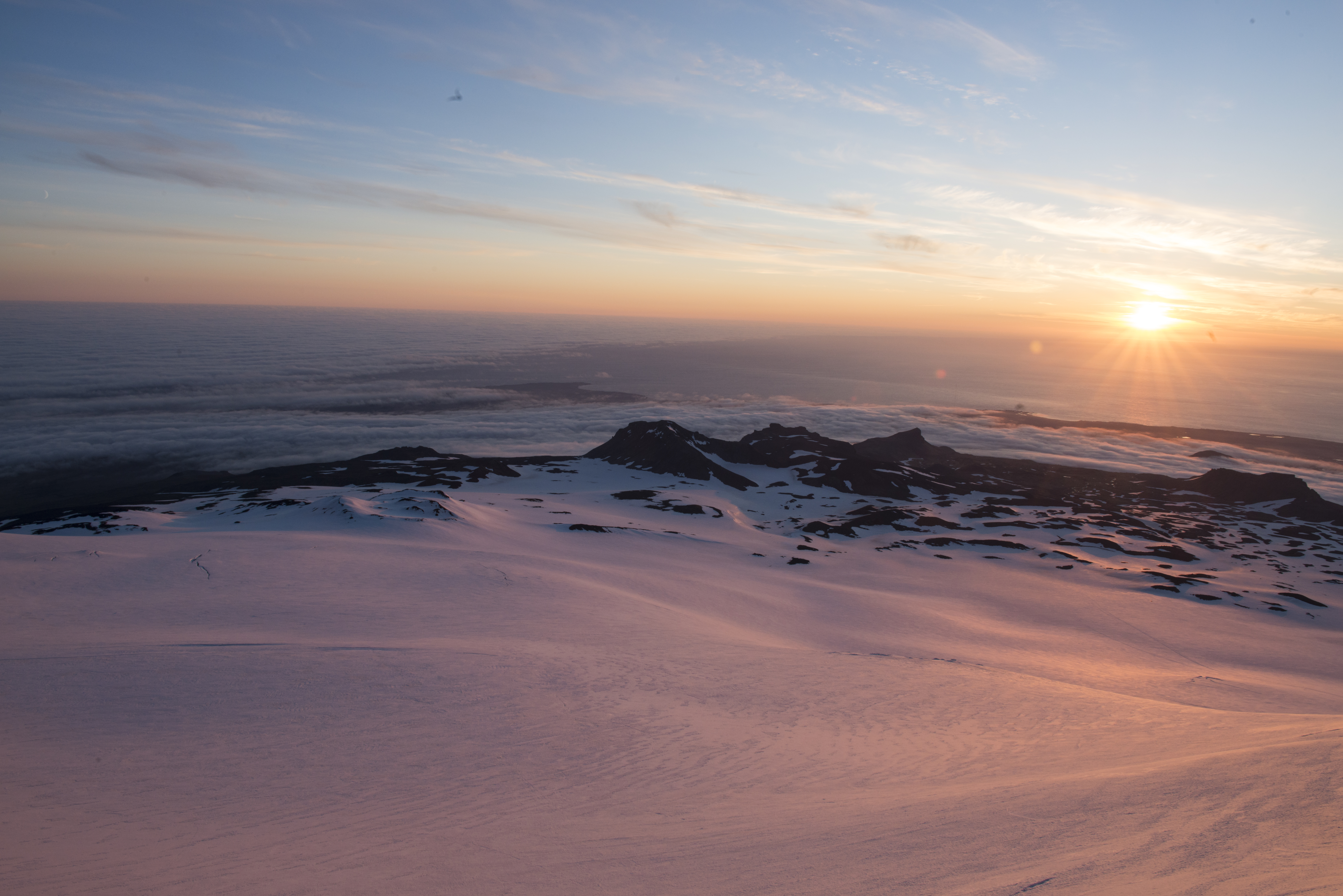
View from Snæfellsjökull on the summer solstice.

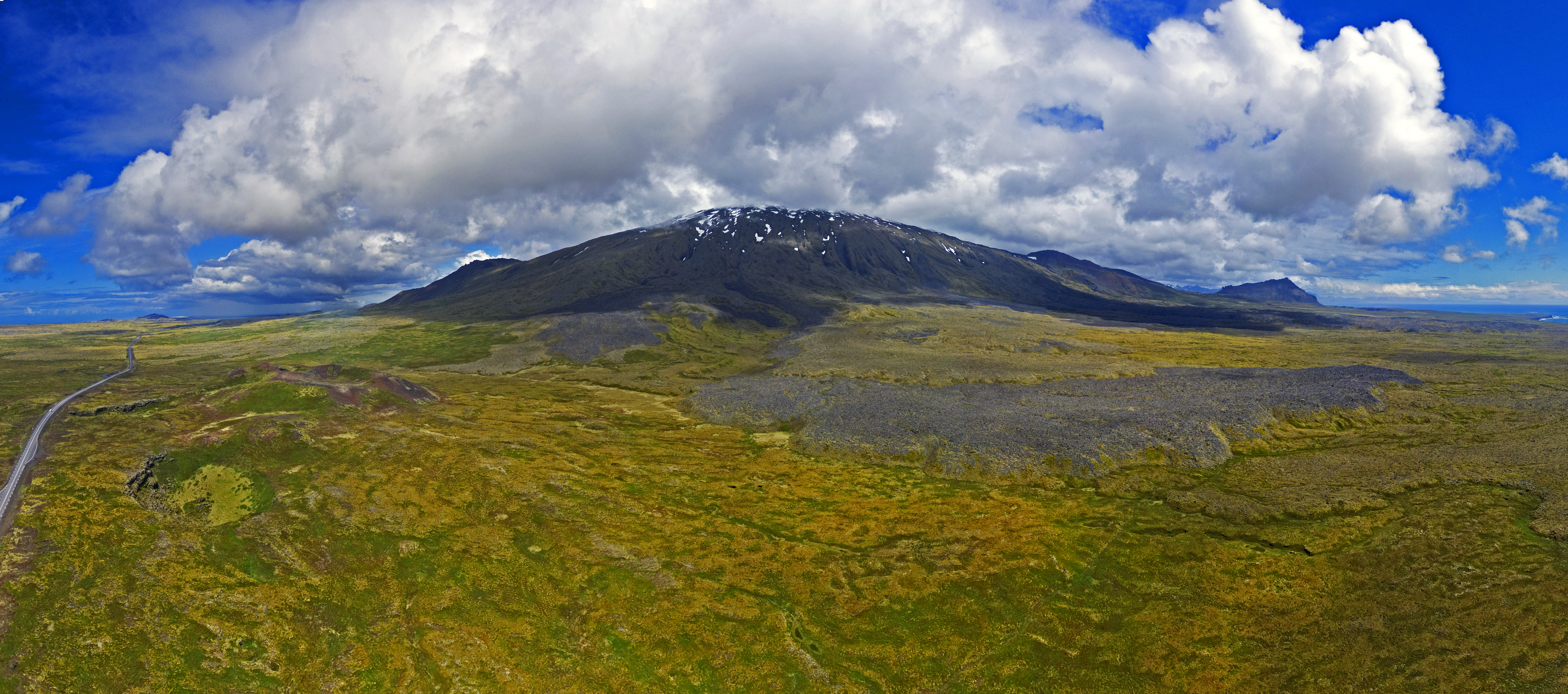
Snæfellsjökull aerial panorama, taken from its west side in June 2017

== Climbing ==
In summer, the saddle near the summit can be reached easily by walking, although the glacier's crevasses must be avoided. Several tour companies run regular guided walks during the season. Reaching the true summit requires technical ice climbing.

== In culture ==
=== Literature ===
Snæfellsjökull serves as the entrance to the subterranean journey in Jules Verne's classic science fiction novel, Journey to the Center of the Earth (1864). It is also featured in the 1960s Blind Birds trilogy by Czech SF writer Ludvík Souček, loosely inspired by Verne's work. While trying to discern whether Verne actually visited Iceland, a Czechoslovak-Icelandic science party discovers an ancient alien outpost in the cave system under Snæfellsjökull.

It also figures prominently in the novel Under the Glacier (1968) by Icelandic Nobel laureate Halldór Laxness.

=== Radio and podcasting ===
Snæfellsjökull is the setting and subject of "Lava and Ice" (episode 2) of Wireless Nights, Jarvis Cocker's BBC Radio 4 and podcast series.

=== Presidential election ===
The campaign "Snæfellsjökul [sic] fyrir forseta" (transl. Snæfellsjökull for President) proposed Snæfellsjökull as a candidate in the 2024 Icelandic presidential election, asserting that it met the requirements of being an Icelandic citizen, aged over 35, with no criminal record, and with a supporting petition.

== See also ==
- Geography of Iceland
- Glaciers of Iceland
- Iceland plume
- List of national parks of Iceland
- Volcanism of Iceland
  - List of volcanic eruptions in Iceland
  - List of volcanoes in Iceland

== Additional sources ==
- Thordarson, Thor; Hoskuldsson, Armann (2002). Iceland (Classic Geology in Europe 3). Terra Publishing. pp. 208 pp. ISBN 1-903544-06-8.
