= Ina von Grumbkow =

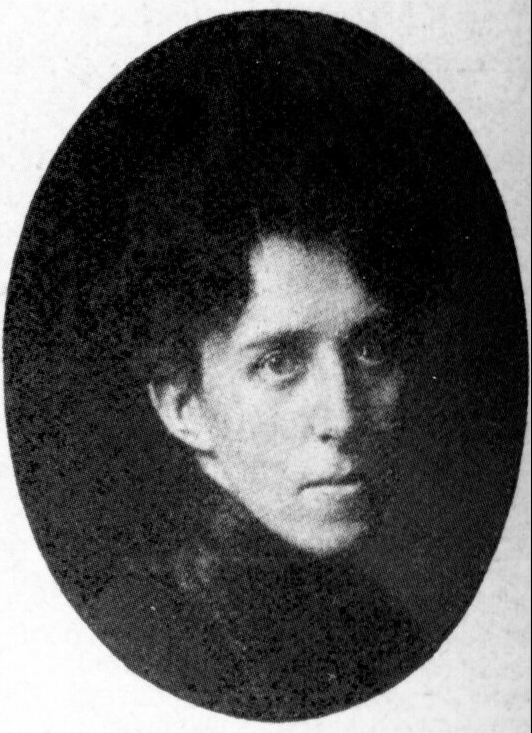
An undated portrait

Ina von Grumbkow born Viktorine Helena Natalie von Grumbkow, later Ina Reck (15 September 1872 – 20 January 1942) was an explorer, artist, and writer who travelled through Iceland in search of her lost fiance Walther von Knebel who died without a trace in 1907. She later married the geologist Hans Reck. While in Africa, she documented the dinosaur dig sites in Tendaguru.

== Life and work ==
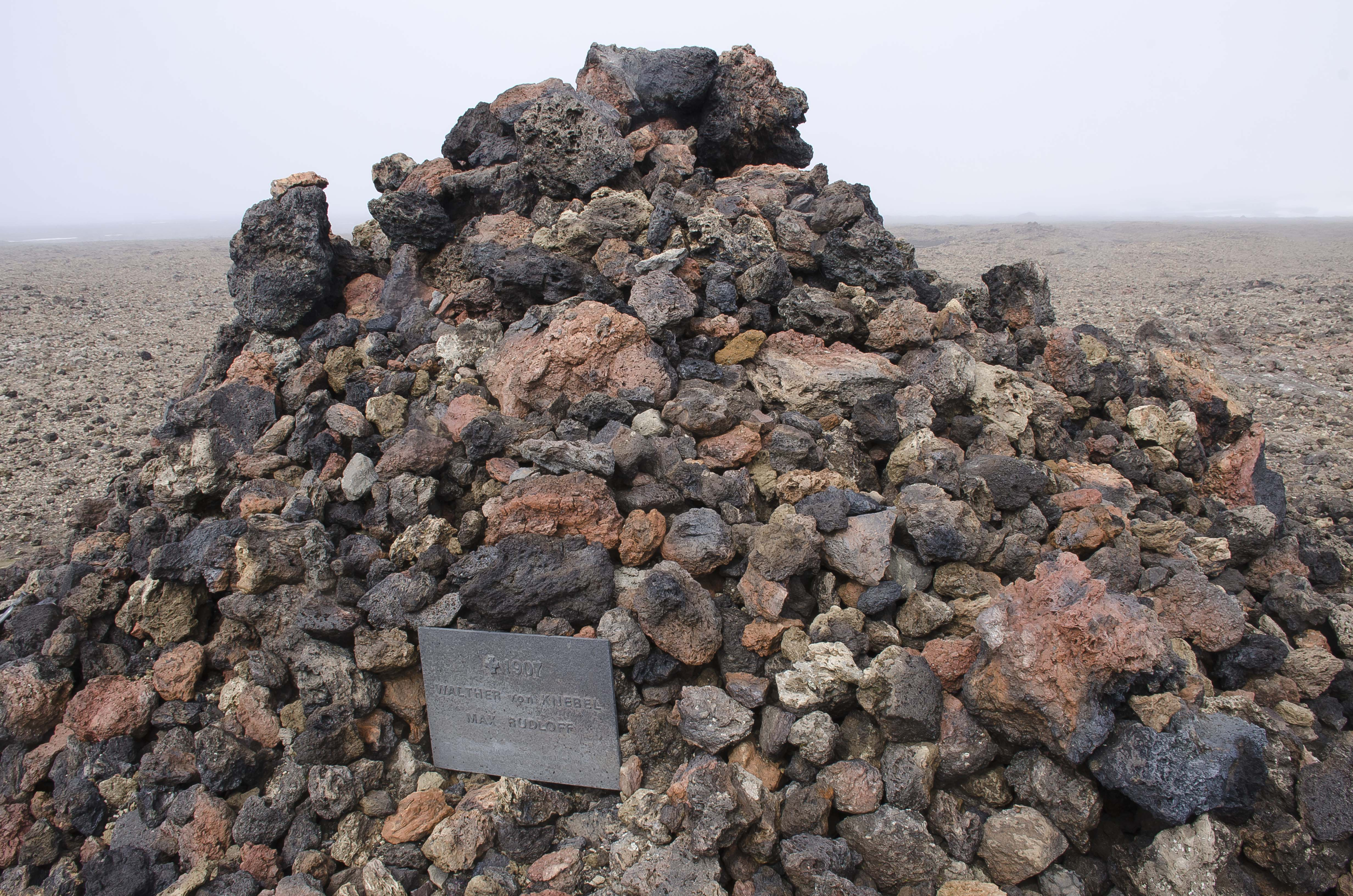
Monument to Walther von Knebel and Max Rudloff

Von Grumbkow was born in Ovelgönne in a family of Pomeranian noble Viktor von Grumbkow (1842–1872) and Ina Bendixen (1840–1914). A cousin was the lawyer Waldemar von Grumbkow (1888–1959). She grew up with her widowed mother in Lichterfelde, Berlin, and was likely educated at home and studied geology privately under Walther von Knebel (1880–1907) from Berlin with whom she got engaged. Von Knebel undertook a study of volcanoes into Iceland in 1907 along with the Berlin artist Max Rudloff and they were reported missing on 10 July 1907. They went on a boat on Lake Askja and their bodies were never found but thought to have been buried under an avalanche on the south wall of the Askja massif at the edge of the glacier of Vatnajökull. The geologist Hans Spethmann (1885–1957) who had joined the team in Akureyri and was working nearby was the first to note their loss. Telegrams were sent home but doubts remained. In 1908 Ina von Grumbkow sought a fund from the Prussian Academy of Sciences to travel and examine the location and fate of her fiance for herself. She was joined by Berlin geologist Hans Reck (1886–1937) who she would later marry. They reached Reykjavik on 24 June 1908 and they were joined by Sigurdur Sumarlidarson who led the expedition They visited Hekla (1491 m) and "Herdubreid", "Die Breitschultrige" (1682 m) and then reached Askja where they only found the wooden boat of the lost pair. They erected a four-meter stone pyramid in memory of the lost explorers.

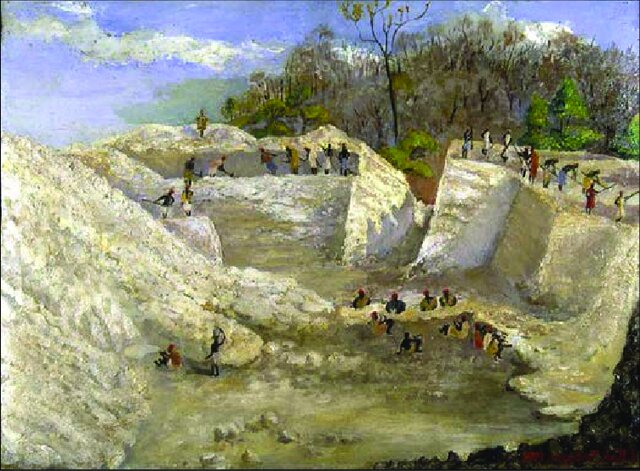
Dig site at Tendaguru, oil painting by Ina Reck (1912)

Ina von Grumbkow married the much younger Hans Reck in 1912. Along with Hans Spethmann they proposed to rename two crater lakes of Askja, Öskjuvatn and Viti, as Knebelsee and Rudloffkrater. In 1909 she wrote a book on her Iceland travels in Ísafold: Reisebilder Aus Island. She travelled to German East Africa along with Reck who was investigating the Olduvai Gorge during World War I. In 1912 Ina was involved in organizing the digs and she illustrated the Tendaguru site. She had to manage 400 workers at the dig site, help distribute food and deal with medical problems while her husband explored other area. She visited again in 1914 and stayed on until 1918, living at Dodoma, Ufiome and making visits to places like Hanang. In 1924 she wrote about it in Mit der Tendaguru-Expedition im Süden von Deutsch-Ostafrika. In 1925 she wrote a book with her illustrations on her travels in North and – German East Africa Auf einsamen Märschen im Norden von Deutsch-Ostafrika: Reiseskizzen. She was separated from her husband by the British army and she was interned in Dar-es-Salaam by the British during the war period and she returned in 1919. In 1931 Hans went again to work with Louis Leakey. In 1933, she wrote about her experiences in Africa in the Berliner Illustrierte (November 24, 1933: ''Riesensaurier vom Tendaguru''). Reck went again to Africa in 1936, but this time without Ina and he died of a heart attack in Mozambique. Ina then went to live in Glienicke near Berlin until her death.
