= Öskjuvatn =

Lake in Iceland

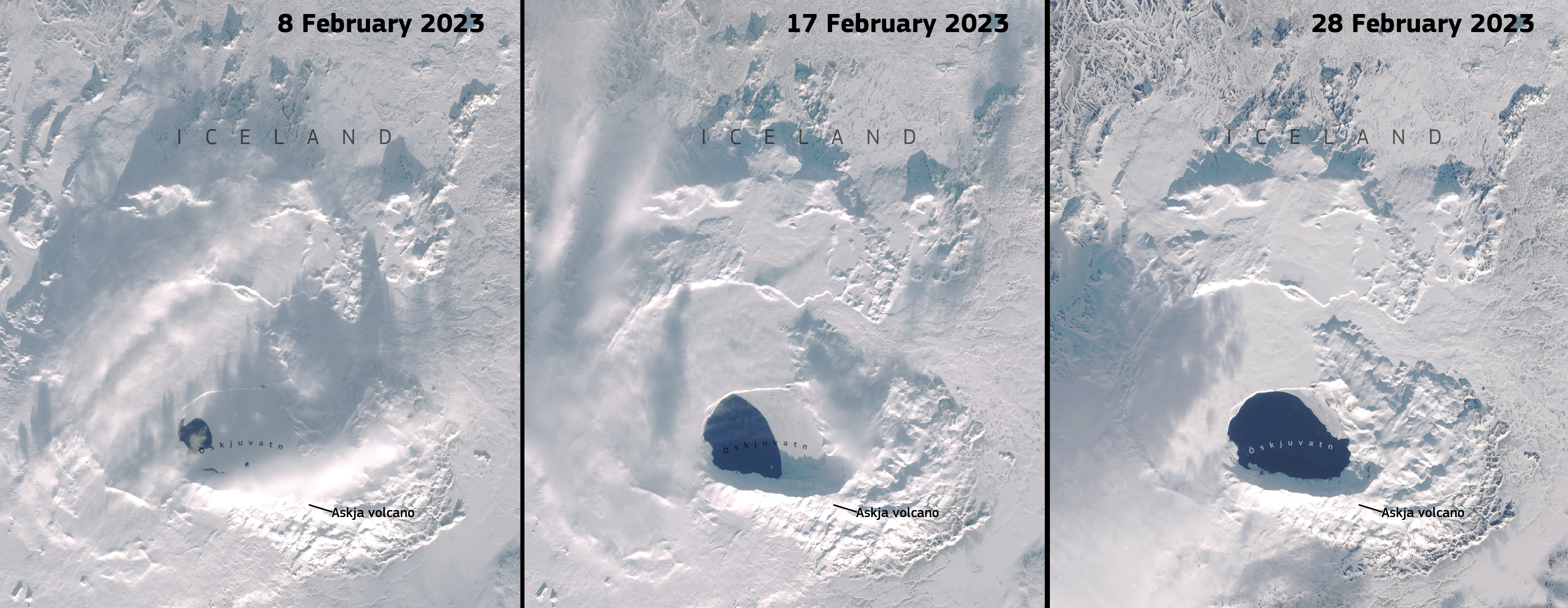
- The ice on Öskjuvatn melting in early 2023

- Location within Iceland
- Coordinates: 65°02′N 16°45′W
- Basin countries: Iceland
- Surface area: 11.5403 km^{2} (4.4557 sq mi)
- Average depth: 109 m (358 ft)
- Max. depth: 217 m (712 ft)
- Water volume: 1.3394 km^{3} (0.3213 cu mi)
- Surface elevation: 1,053 m (3,455 ft)

Öskjuvatn (Icelandic pronunciation: [ˈœscʏˌvahtn̥], "Askja Lake") is a lake in the Highlands of Iceland. Its surface area is about 11 km^{2} (4.2 sq mi). With a depth of 217 m (712 ft), it is the second-deepest lake in Iceland after Jökulsárlón.

The lake is situated in the crater of the volcano Askja in the northeast of the glacier Vatnajökull. The name Öskjuvatn simply means Askja lake. Like the neighbouring crater Víti, it was created by an enormous volcanic eruption in 1875.

== History ==
The lake was first surveyed in 1876 by Professor Johnstrup and Lieutenant Caroc. It was roughly circular with a diameter of about 4000 feet (1220 m) and 232 m (761 ft) below the floor of Askja caldera. Its water was light-green, and covered from recently erupted pumice, at the temperature of 22 °C (72 °F).

In 1878 the lake was about 600 ft (180 m) below the Askja caldera floor, 5 miles (8.0 km) (8 km) in circumference and at a temperature of 20.5 °C (68.9 °F).

In 1881 the lake temperature was down 12 °C (54 °F).

In 1884 the lake temperature was down 14 °C (57 °F), the northwestern length of the lake was 10,000 ft (3,000 m) and the lake was 150 m (490 ft) below the floor of Askja caldera.

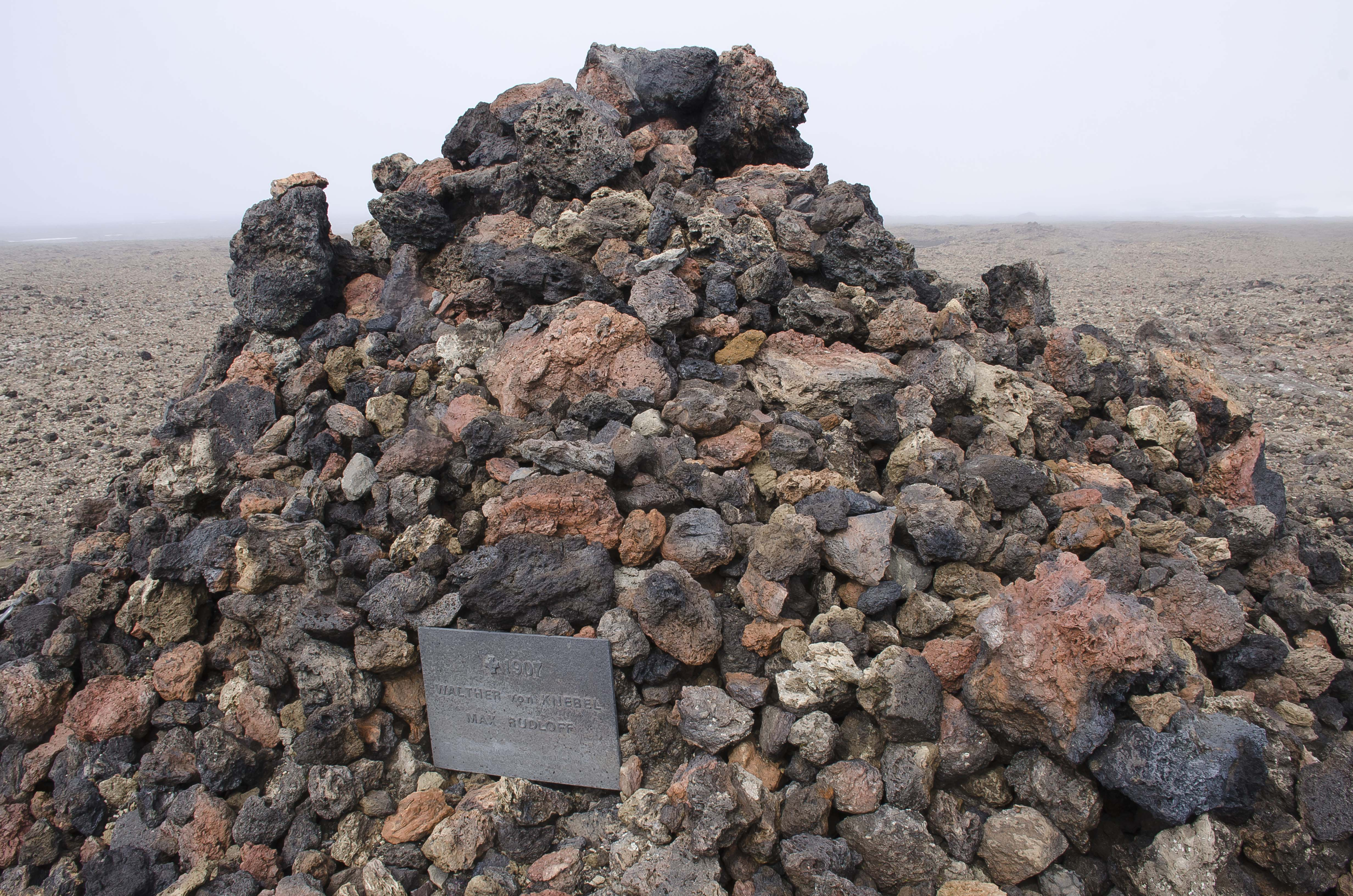
Knebel Rudloff monument on the Öskjuvatn shore

On July 10, 1907, two German scientists, Walter von Knebel and Max Rudloff disappeared while exploring the lake in a small boat. The lake was described at the time as almost rectangular and about 5 by 3 km (3.1 by 1.9 mi) and 60 m (200 ft) below the floor of Askja caldera. Knebel's fiancée, Ina von Grumbkow, led an expedition in search of them with a vulcanologist Hans Reck, but no trace of them was ever found. Suppositions at the time suggested that seismic volcanic disturbances could have caused a landslip or similar occurrence, and recorded that only two days previously the telegraph cable to Iceland had been broken by deep water disturbances for the first time since it was laid, close to the Icelandic coast. Reck's 1908 measurements were a mean lake temperature of 6.5 °C (43.7 °F), dimensions of 4.5 by 3 km (2.8 by 1.9 mi), no change in surface height, and a depth of more than 140 m (460 ft).

In 1917 the lake surface was found to be 1,011 m (3,317 ft) above sea level, with a temperature of 7.5 °C (45.5 °F).

Hans Reck visited again in 1932 and noted the lakes shape had changed following previous eruptions. There were other eruptions before the first full bathymetry in 1963.

The maximum depth of 217 m (712 ft) was possibly greater in a 2012 survey but temperature corrections precluded an accurate figure. What is known is that the lake floor has subsided since 1876.

== See also ==
- Geography of Iceland
- Iceland plume
- List of lakes of Iceland
- List of rivers of Iceland
- Volcanism of Iceland
