= Adlet =

Mythological creature from Inuit mythology

The Adlet (or Erqigdlet) are a race of creatures in the Inuit mythology of Greenland, as well as the Labrador and Hudson Bay coasts. While the word refers to inland native American tribes, it also denotes a humanoid dog-legged tribe. The lower part of the body of the canine Adlet is like that of a dog and their upper part is like a man's. All Adlet run quickly, and their encounters with men usually end with man as the victor.

In Inuit lore, they are often portrayed as in conflict with humans, and are supposed to be taller than Inuit and white people. In some stories they are cannibals. Inuit from Labrador use the term Adlet, tribes west of the Hudson Bay use the word Erqigdlit. The monstrous race begotten by the Adlet was identified with inland Native Americans by the Labrador and Hudson Bay tribes; Inuit from Greenland and Baffin Land, which had no native American neighbors, use the term to refer to the half human, half canine creatures.

An etymology of the word is proposed by H. Newell Wardle: adlet might come from ad, "below," and thus denote "those below." Alternatively, he argues, it might come from the stem agdlak, "striped, streaked," thus "the striped ones," in reference to American Indians who lived to the west and painted their faces. "Erqigdlet" might be a derogatory term denoting the same people. Atlat means "others," denoting American Indians from the Inuit perspective, though Newell Wardle considers this possibility secondary and deriving from phonetic similarity.

== Origin ==
Franz Boas, an ethnologist who recorded many Inuit stories, gives an account of the origin of the Adlet; he had heard the story in Baffin Land, specifically in Cumberland Sound from an Inuk named Pakaq. His transcription, a translation by H. Rink, and an explanation (by Boas) were published in The Journal of American Folklore in 1889. The Inuit of Greenland, according to Rink, tell the same story as those in Baffin Land. The story is often referred to as "The Girl and the Dogs" on the west coast of Greenland; on the east coast of Greenland it is known as "The Origin of the Qavdlunait and Irqigdlit" (that is, Scandinavians or Nordic people and Indians).

A woman, Niviarsiang ("the girl"), lives with her father, Savirqong, but will not marry, and hence is also called Uinigumissuitung ("she who wouldn't take a husband"). After rejecting all her suitors, she marries a dog, Ijirqang, with white and red spots. Of their ten children, five are dogs and the others are Adlet, with dog's bodies for their lower half and man's bodies for their upper half. Since Ijirqang does not go hunting and the children are very hungry, it falls to Savirqong to provide for the noisy household. At last he puts them into a boat and carries them off to a small island, telling Ijirqang to come and get meat daily. Niviarsiang hangs a pair of boots around his neck and he swims ashore, but Savirqong, instead of giving him meat, puts stones in the boots and Ijirqang drowns. In revenge, Niviarsiang sends the young dogs over to gnaw off her father's feet and hands. He, in return kicks her overboard when she happens to be in his boat, and when she hangs on the gunwale he cuts off her fingers, which, when they fall in the ocean, turn into whales and seals.

Since Niviarsiang is scared her father might kill the Adlet, she sends them inland, and from them a numerous people springs. The young dogs she sends across the ocean in a makeshift boat, and arriving beyond the sea they became the Scandinavian ancestors.

== Anthropological interpretation ==
One interpretation of the phenomenon of the Adlet (and the theme of the "Dog Husband") sees the difference between the dog-like children and the other, the Adlet, as crucial. The dogs are sent overseas and will return as white Scandinavians to bring things favorable to the Inuit, whereas the Adlet, "swift runners of an aggressive disposition," become a kind of inland spirit, to be kept at bay. Thus, the "Dog Husband" myth carries the value of a cargo cult: "by offering their [sexual] favors to the dog-like Whites aka Nords, the Inuit daughters serve as mediators in obtaining their desirable goods." A reading of the account as a "Whaler myth," in a culture in which the Inuit were economically dependent on the mechanically superior products supplied by the Scandinavian whalers, the story transforms material dependence on the white whaler into a reciprocal relationship, whereby the Scandinavian Nord comes back to repay his mother.

Franz Boas and Hinrich Rink offer two options for the occurrence of a legend explaining the origin of whites aka Nordic people. Either the tradition dates back to when the Inuit first made contact with Scandinavians (which they consider highly unlikely), or, more likely, it is the adaptation of an already existing tradition, modified to account for the coming of the Scandinavians aka Nords. Signe Rink proposes a similar explanation in a hypothetical historical narrative that also takes linguistic evidence into account.

The "Dog Husband" theme is paralleled in other tribal mythologies. The Dakelh (formerly known as the "Carrier tribe"), the indigenous people of the inland of British Columbia, tell a number of similar stories. In one of those stories, a woman suspects she is being violated nightly, and throws a little bag of vermilion paint on the violator; the next day, she identifies him as a big dog, and later gives birth to four dogs. Father Morice, writing about this and other stories he had been told by the Carrier people, posits that there might be "a sort of national tradition among the hyperborean races of America, since even the Eskimo have a story which is evidently the equivalent of it," proceeding to summarize the account as given by Franz Boas in "The Central Eskimo" (1888). Similar stories (both about the Adlet and the woman who marries a dog) are told on the Siberian side of the Bering Strait, among the Chukchi.

== Adlet stories ==
A number of stories containing Adlet were written down by ethnographers in the nineteenth and twentieth centuries.

=== "The Tornit and the Adlit" ===
Many tales were told by the "Smith Sound Eskimo," an Inuk from Smith Sound who was in New York City in the winter of 1897–1898, and published by A.L. Kroeber for the Journal of American Folklore. Two Tornits (another fabulous race from Inuit lore) find themselves among savage and cannibalistic Adlet. They sneak out at night and as they are leaving they cut the thongs on the Adlet's sledges that fasten the crossbars to the runners. The dogs start barking, but as the Adlet mount their sledges the runners fall off and the Tornit get away. The same Smith Sound Eskimo also told a variant of the Adlet story related by Boas in "The Central Eskimo." In this version, the Tornit are the woman's offspring as well, but Kroeber remarks that they are "ordinarily not connected with this tale." Other stories told by the Smith Sound Eskimo, such as "The Origin of the Narwhal," also contain murderous Adlet.

=== Aselu ===
The Inuit of Point Barrow, Alaska, tell of a dog named Aselu who was tied to a stick. He set himself free by biting through the stick, then went inside, where he had intercourse with a woman. She consequently gave birth to men and dogs.

== Literature cited ==
- Boas, Franz (1888). "The Central Eskimo". Annual Reports. 6. Bureau of American Ethnology: 470–666.
- Boas, Franz (1907). "The Eskimo of Baffin Land and Hudson Bay". Bulletin of the American Museum of Natural History. 15: 4–570.
- Boas, Franz; Hinrich Rink (1889). "Eskimo Tales and Songs". Journal of American Folklore. 2 (5): 123–131. doi:10.2307/533321. JSTOR 533321.
- Boas, Franz (1982). "The Folklore of the Eskimo". Race, language, and culture. U of Chicago P. ISBN 978-0-226-06241-9.
- Bogoras, Waldemar (1902). "The Folklore of Northeastern Asia, as Compared with That of Northwestern America". American Anthropologist. new series. 4 (4): 577–683. doi:10.1525/aa.1902.4.4.02a00020.
- Green, Thomas A. (2008). The Greenwood Library of World Folktales: North and South America. Greenwood Press. ISBN 978-0-313-33787-1.
- Hodge, Frederick Webb (1907). Handbook of American Indians North of Mexico. Government Printing Office. ISBN 1-58218-750-9.
- Kroeber, A.L. (1899). "Tales of the Smith Sound Eskimo". The Journal of American Folklore. 12 (46). American Folklore Society: 166–82. doi:10.2307/534175. JSTOR 534175.
- Morice, Father (October 1896). "Three Carrier Myths". Transactions of the Canadian Institute. Royal Canadian Institute: 1–36.
- Murdoch, John (1886). "A Few Legendary Fragments from the Point Barrow Eskimos". The American Naturalist. 20 (7). American Society of Naturalists: 593–99. doi:10.1086/274287.
- Newell Wardle, H. (1900). "The Sedna Cycle: A Study in Myth Evolution". American Anthropologist. new series. 2 (3): 568–580. doi:10.1525/aa.1900.2.3.02a00100. JSTOR 658969.
- Rink, Hinrich; Robert Brown (1875). Tales and traditions of the Eskimo: with a sketch of their habits, religion, language and other peculiarities. W. Blackwood and Sons. ISBN 0-486-29966-X.
- Rink, Signe (1898). "The Girl and the Dogs: An Eskimo Folk-Tale with Comments". American Anthropologist. 11 (6): 181–87. doi:10.1525/aa.1898.11.6.02a00030. JSTOR 658452.
- Sonne, Birgitte (1990). The Acculturative Role of Sea Woman: Early contact relations between Inuit and Whites as revealed in the Origin Myth of Sea Woman. Commission for Scientific Investigations in Greenland. ISBN 978-87-635-1198-8.
