= Oldoway Man =

Skeleton found in Tanzania in 1913

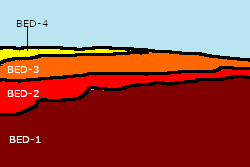
The beds of Oldovai Gorge

The Oldoway Man was a skeleton found in Olduvai Gorge, Tanzania, in 1913. Found inside concreted sediments by professor Hans Reck, it was thought to be nearly 700,000 years old, which would have pushed the arrival date of humans back by nearly 500,000 years. The site was later found to be an ancient grave.

== Appearance ==
The skeleton was like a modern human, but it had 36 teeth instead of 32. The Oldoway man was about 1.7907 meters (5 ft. 10½ in) tall and had long legs, a long and narrow head, a big nose, long upper lip, big jaw and chin. Professor Reck described Oldoway man's lower teeth filed to points, which is still seen in certain living African tribes.

== Context ==
Though the skeletal remains appeared human, the depositional layer they were found in dated them to be nearly 700,000 years old, which would have pushed the arrival date of humans back by nearly 500,000 years. Many pseudoscientists used this to deny evolution and promote other conspiracy theories.

Reck assumed that it was an intentional burial and started looking for a grave-cut. He continued to work on it until World War I without success. Louis Leakey learned of this site and went to it to research in 1927. He found a flint axe head near the site at which the skeleton was discovered, and with Reck they found over 80 flint axe heads. Along with this, they also found some rocks in the above sedimentary layers which did not occur there but did occur in the sedimentary layer where the Oldoway man was found, which meant that there was some unnatural digging activity taking place there, further proving that the Oldoway man was intrusive meaning that it had been artificially put there.

== Destruction ==
Due to the Oldoway man being found in what was at the time a German colony, the skeleton was stored in Munich. It was mostly destroyed in Allied bombing raids in World War II.
