= William Lee Howard =

American physician and writer (1860–1918)

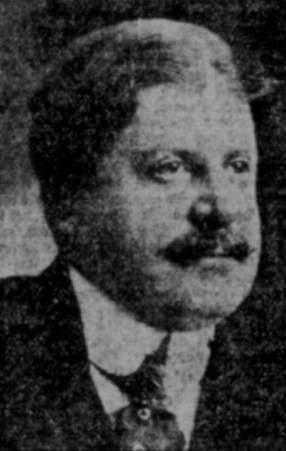
- Howard in 1906
- Born: November 1, 1860; Hartford, Connecticut, U.S.
- Died: March 11, 1918 (aged 57); Massachusetts, U.S.
- Education: University of Vermont (MD)
- Occupations: Physician, writer
- Scientific career
- Fields: Sexology

William Lee Howard (November 1, 1860 – March 11, 1918) was an American physician and writer.

William Lee Howard was born in Hartford, Connecticut, on November 1, 1860. His father was one of the founders of the Republican Party. He attended Williston Seminary, and studied medicine at the College of Physicians and Surgeons, New York. He also spent time at Columbia University, Oxford University, Ecole de Médecine, Paris, and the University of Edinburgh, before ultimately obtaining his M.D. from University of Vermont in 1890. Howard was memorably described by Howard A. Kelly, in the Dictionary of American Biography (1928) as "an eccentric, irresponsible character whose native ability was wasted in a desultory, rambling life, and in neglect of those codes which society has erected as safeguards to the perpetuity of the race. A writer of books on sex subjects, and a pamphleteer ... [he] was held to more esteem by the laity than by the profession". William Lee Howard had written in 1903 that the white race “in every aspect of the term [be] quarantined from the African.”

After graduation he initially spent 2 years on a whaling ship, and later became second mate on a ship in the Africa trade. During 1880 and 1881 he was in Iceland, and claimed to be the first to climb Herðubreið. He was a correspondent for the New York Herald and was involved in the search for the USS Jeannette that was lost on a polar research journey in 1879, spent some time in Siberia and reported on the Mahdist War. He initially practised from 1891 in Baltimore, moving to Massachusetts in 1906, where he died on March 11, 1918.

== Publications ==
- The Perverts, 1901
- Plain Facts on Sex Hygiene, 1910
- Confidential Chats with Girls 1911
- Confidential Chats with Boys, 1911
- Facts for the Married, 1912
- Sex Structure of Society, 1914
- Sex Problems in Worry and Work, 1915
- Breathe and Be Well, 1916
- How to Live Long, 1916
