= Frederik Johnstrup =

Danish professor, geologist and paleontologist

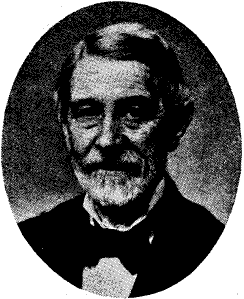
Frederik Johnstrup.

Johannes Frederik Johnstrup (12 March 1818– 31 December 1894) was a Danish professor, geologist and paleontologist. He was the founder of the Danish scientific periodical Meddelelser om Grønland.

== Biography ==
Johnstrup was born at Christianshavn, Denmark. He attended the Technical University of Denmark where he received B.Sc. in 1844. He became an associate professor of mineralogy and natural science at Sorø Academy in 1846. When the academy closed in 1848, he became assistant lecturer in Kolding. Three years later, he taught in Sorø and in 1866, he became professor of mineralogy and geology at the University of Copenhagen and the Polytechnic Institution.

Johnstrup made several geological exploration voyages; 1871 and 1876 in Iceland, 1872 in the Faroe Islands and 1874 in Greenland. In 1876, he led the expedition to Iceland to study Askja and the volcanoes at Mývatn with Þorvaldur Thoroddsen (1855–1921) as his guide.

In 1878, with Heinrich Rink, Johnstrup founded the governmental institution, Commission for the Direction of Geological and Geographical Investigations in Greenland.

He was the founder of the scientific periodical Meddelelser om Grønland which was established in 1878. In 1888, he led the Geological Survey of Denmark. In 1893, He developed the University of Copenhagen Geological Museum, and led the construction of a new building on Øster Voldgade in Copenhagen.

Johnstrup authored a number of treatises by which he greatly promoted the understanding of Denmark's geological conditions, particularly the glacial phenomena. In 1894, he became an honorary doctorate at the university. In 1892 became a Commander First Class of the Order of the Dannebrog.
