= Dyngjufjöll =

Volcanic mountain range in Iceland

Dyngjufjöll Mountain range
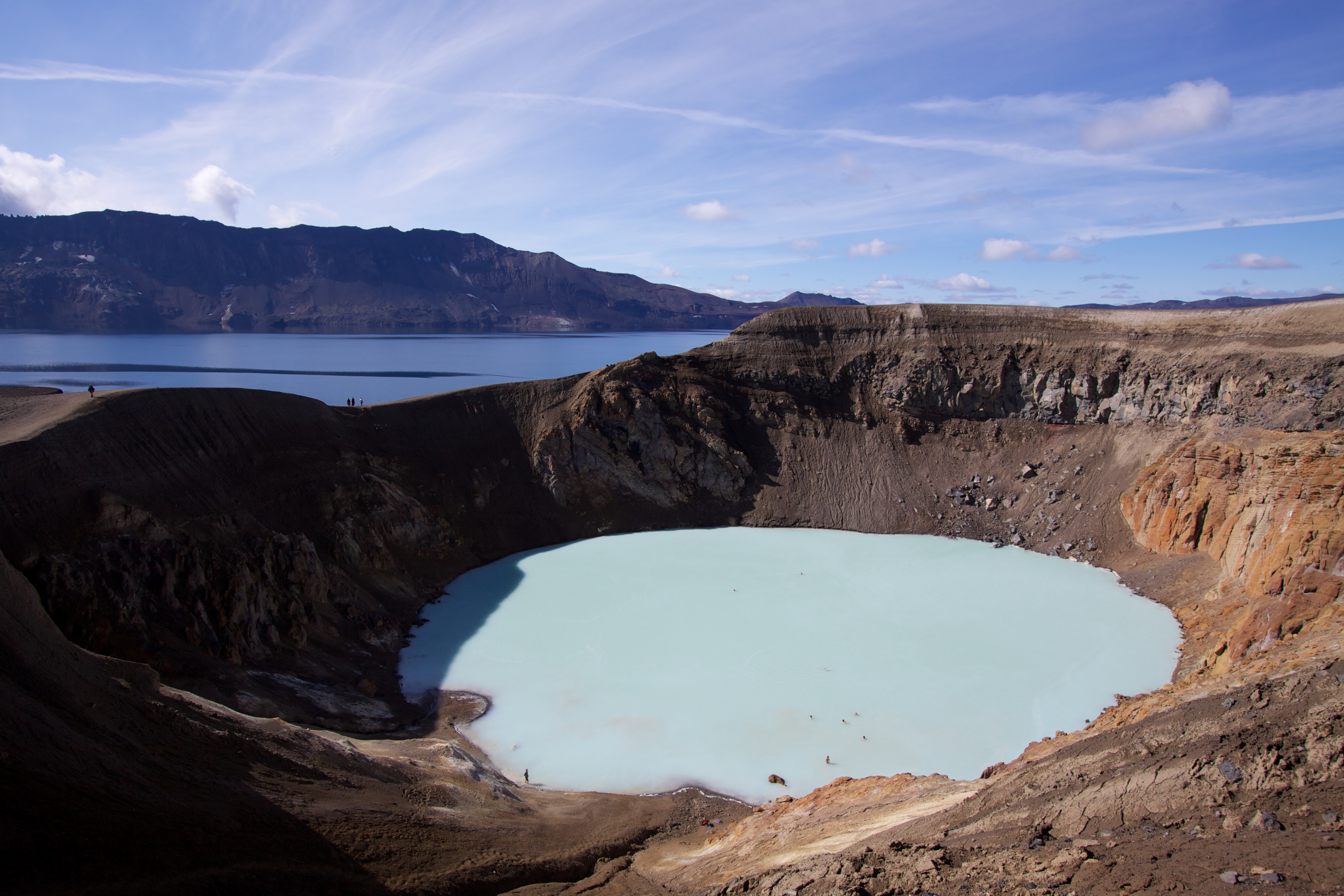
- Dyngjufjöll with Askja caldera and explosion-crater Víti

Highest point
- Elevation: 1,516 m (4,974 ft)
- Listing: Volcanoes of Iceland
- Coordinates: 65°01′59″N 16°46′59″W

Geography
- Location within Iceland
- Location: Iceland
- Parent range: Dyngjufjöll

Geology
- Mountain type: caldera
- Last eruption: October to December 1961

The Dyngjufjöll is a volcanic mountain range in the northeast of Iceland which belongs to the Askja volcanic system. It is part of the Vatnajökull National Park, and contains the Askja caldera.

== Location ==
The huge mountain massif is located in the highlands of Iceland, more precisely in the Ódáðahraun and covers around 600 km^{2}. It forms an almost perfect square with a side length of around 24 km.

Vatnajökull with its Dyngjujökull glacier tongue is 15 km south of the mountains.

On the west side, the Dyngjudalur valley cuts into the mountains, so that this is called the Vestari-Dyngjufjöll . These also include the central volcano of the Askja volcanic system.

The region is only accessible for a few months of the year. Being situated in the rain shadow to the northeast of the Vatnajökull glacier, the area receives only about 450 mm (18 in) of rainfall annually.

=== NASA ===
The area was used by NASA during training for the Apollo program to prepare astronauts for the lunar missions. Their main objective in Askja was to study geology. The Astronaut Monument in Húsavík lists the 32 astronauts who participated.

== Geography ==
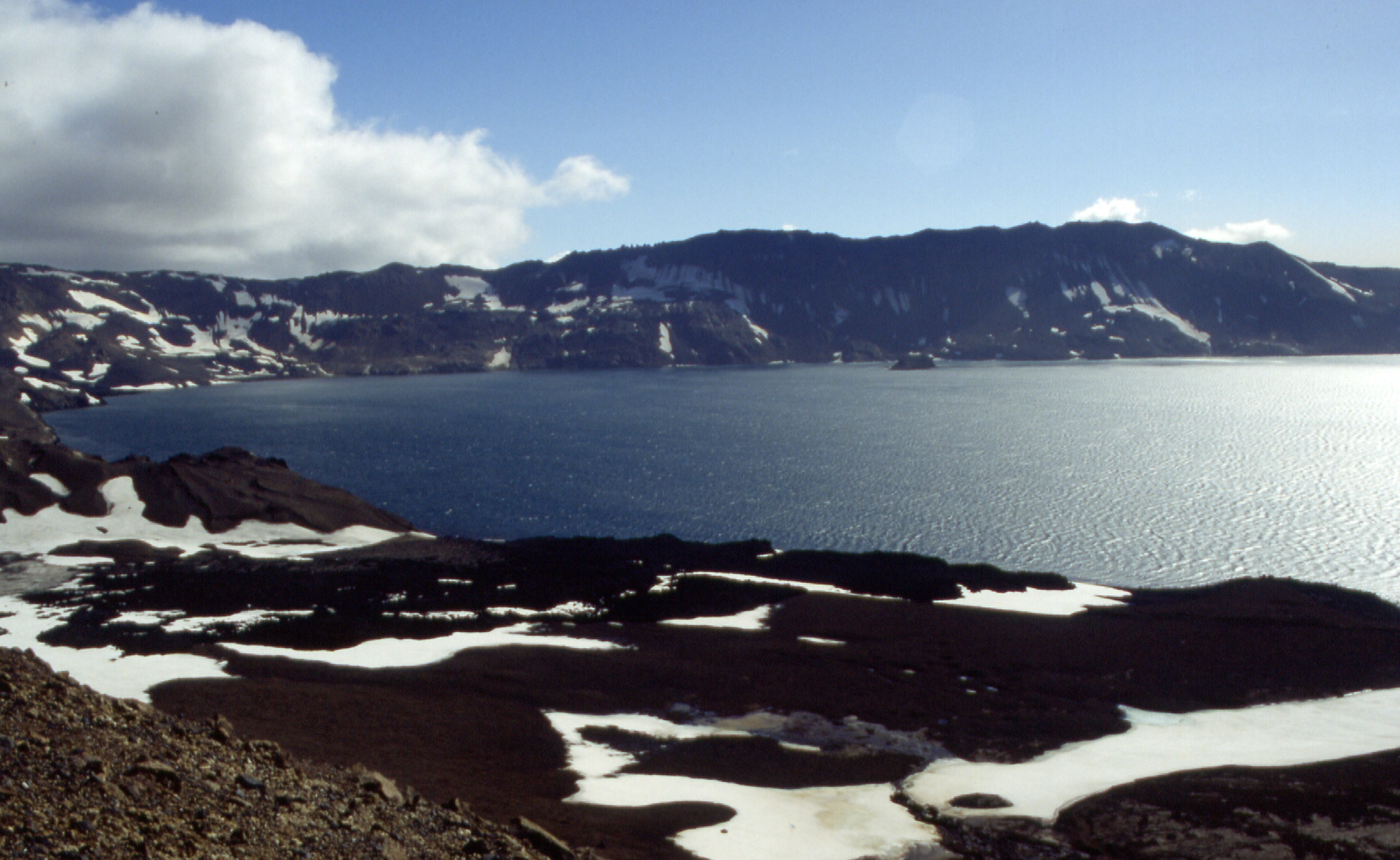
Öskjuvatn caldera

Many peaks in Dyngjufjöll reach between 1,300 and 1,500 m and thus rise above the bottom of the Askja Caldera by around 100 – 300 m.

The highest peak is Þorvaldstindur with a height of 1,510 m. It is named after an Icelandic geologist, Þorvaldur Thoroddsen.

This is the central volcano of an approximately 150 km long fissure system, which is also called Askja after its main caldera.

The mountains are mostly made of palagonite . They appear to be the remains of a large Ice Age stratovolcano. But since then the volcano has continued to work steadily, so that thick layers of lava and ash cover the palagonite in most places.

One of the passes between the peaks, Jónsskarð, is also named after an Icelandic geologist, Jón Þorkelsson, who was the first to describe the Askja volcano. He examined it after the great eruption of 1875. The lowest pass between these mountains, which also form the edge of the Askja caldera, is the Öskjuop.

Here the caldera opens to the east and a hiking trail leads through it to Lake Öskjuvatn. Two German researchers, Max Rudloff and Walther von Knebel, who disappeared in the area around this time, probably drowned in this in 1907 . Knebel's fiancée, Ina von Grumbkow, organized an unsuccessful search expedition the next year, in which she also took part.

=== Drekagil Gorge ===
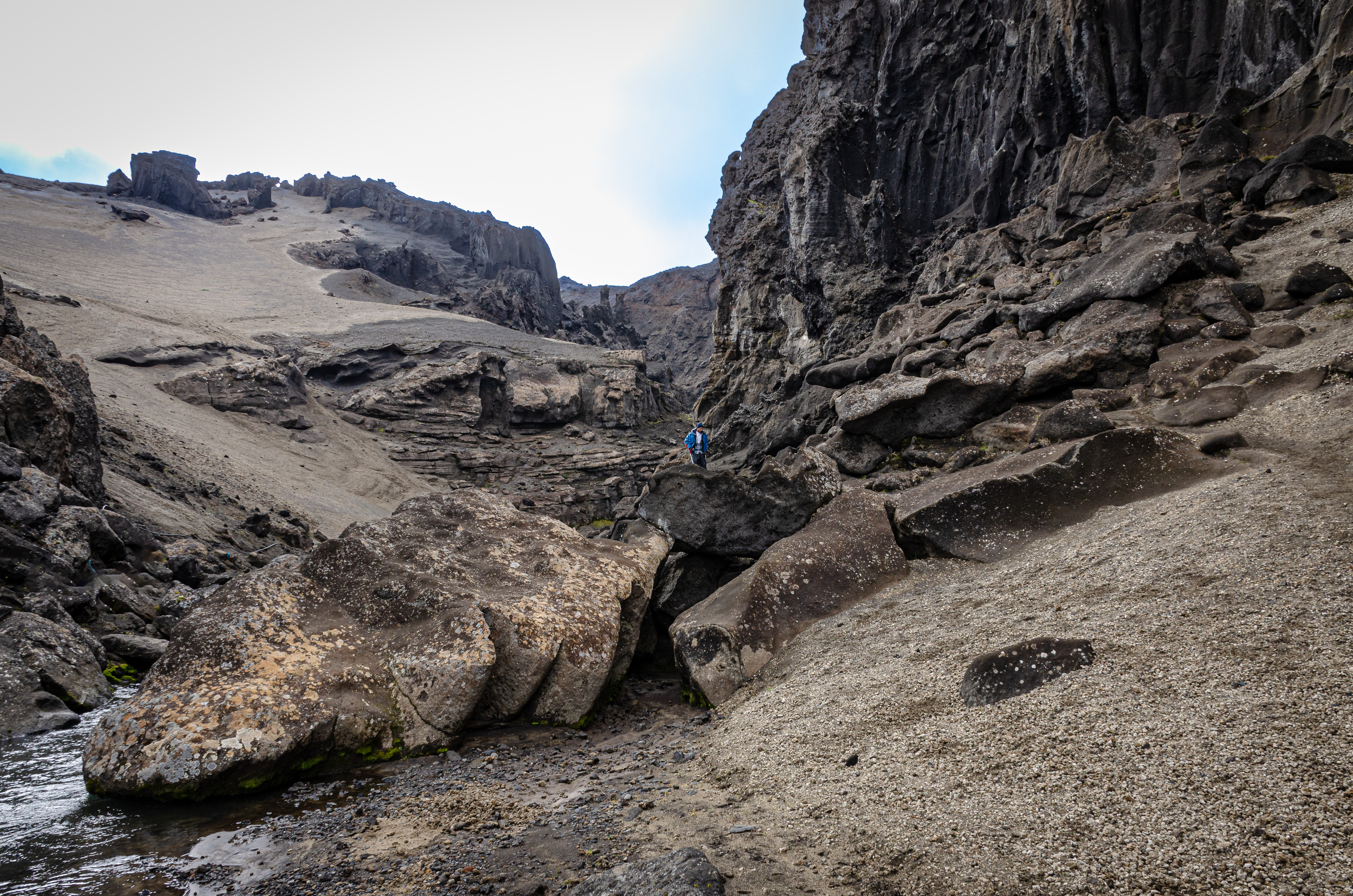
Drekagil canyon

Also to the east of it is a gorge called the Drachenschlucht (Isl. Drekagil). There is a Dreki hut belonging to the Akureyri hiking club. This hiking club also runs the Dyngjufjöll hut, which is located north-northwest of the Askja.

=== See also ===
- List of volcanic eruptions in Iceland
