= Commission for Scientific Investigations in Greenland =

Danish-Greenlandic commission

The Commission for Scientific Investigations in Greenland (Danish: Kommissionen for Videnskabelige undersøgelser i Grønland - KVUG - Greenlandic: Kalaallit Nunaanni Ilisimatusarneq Pillugu Isumalioqatigiissitamut) is a Danish-Greenlandic commission coordinating research in Greenland, which has existed since 1878. It serves an advisory function to both the Danish Minister for Science and the Greenland home rule. The commission consists of active researchers from the disciplines of humanities, social science and technical and natural science with equal representation of the two countries and the chair alternating between them. The commission funds research projects, particularly in order to initialize new research. The commission published the journal Meddelelser om Grønland - since 1975 issued as three separate monograph series:

- MoG Geoscience
- MoG Bioscience
- MoG Man & Society

== History ==
The commission was established in 1878 by initiative of the professor of geology Frederik Johnstrup. He argued that the State of Denmark should spend some of the considerable income from kryolite mining concessions on furthering mineralogical and other research activities in Greenland. In the very year of foundation, the commission funded an expedition led by J. A. D. Jensen to explore the inland icecap and the nunataks now named for J. A. D. Jensen. From 1879 to 1920, its official name was the Commission for Leading Geological and Geographical Investigations in Greenland (Commissionen for Ledelsen af de geologiske og geographiske Undersøgelser i Grønland).

During the 1930s through the 1950s, the geologist Lauge Koch had a very strong influence on the commission's work. Because all research activity in Greenland from 1878 onwards have been recorded by the commission, its archives are extremely valuable to research in the history of Arctic exploration.

== Sources ==
- Arneborg, J & Secher, K. (2005) Forskning i Grønland – forskning for Grønland: Hovedtræk af Kommissionens historie. KVUG
