= Askja =

Volcano in Iceland

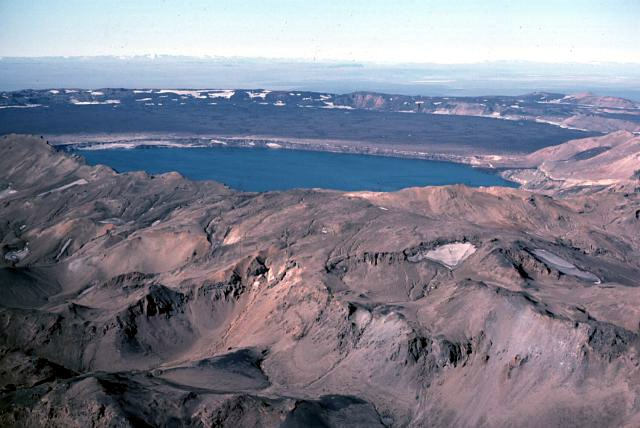
- Askja caldera in 1984

Highest point
- Elevation: 1,516 m (4,974 ft)
- Listing: Volcanoes of Iceland
- Coordinates: 65°01′59″N 16°46′59″W

Geography
- Location within Iceland
- Geological features near the Dyngjufjöll (Askja) central volcano and Askja volcanic system (red outlines). Legend: Other shading shows: calderas; central volcanoes; fissure swarms; subglacial terrain above 1,100 m (3,600 ft); seismically active areas; Clicking on the rectangle in the image enlarges to full window and enables mouse-over with more detail.
- Location: Iceland
- Parent range: Dyngjufjöll

Geology
- Mountain type: caldera
- Last eruption: October to December 1961

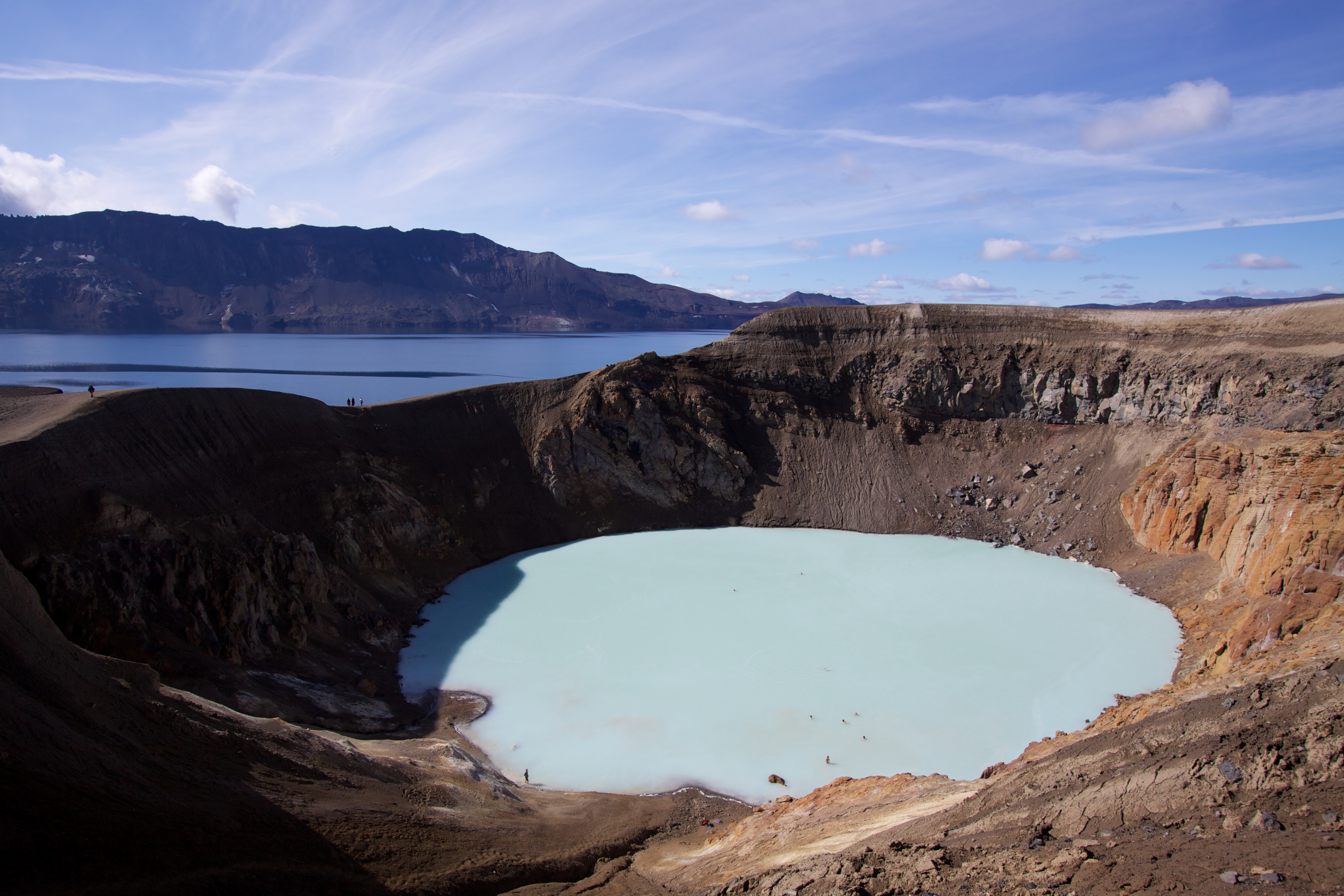
Víti geothermal lake at Askja

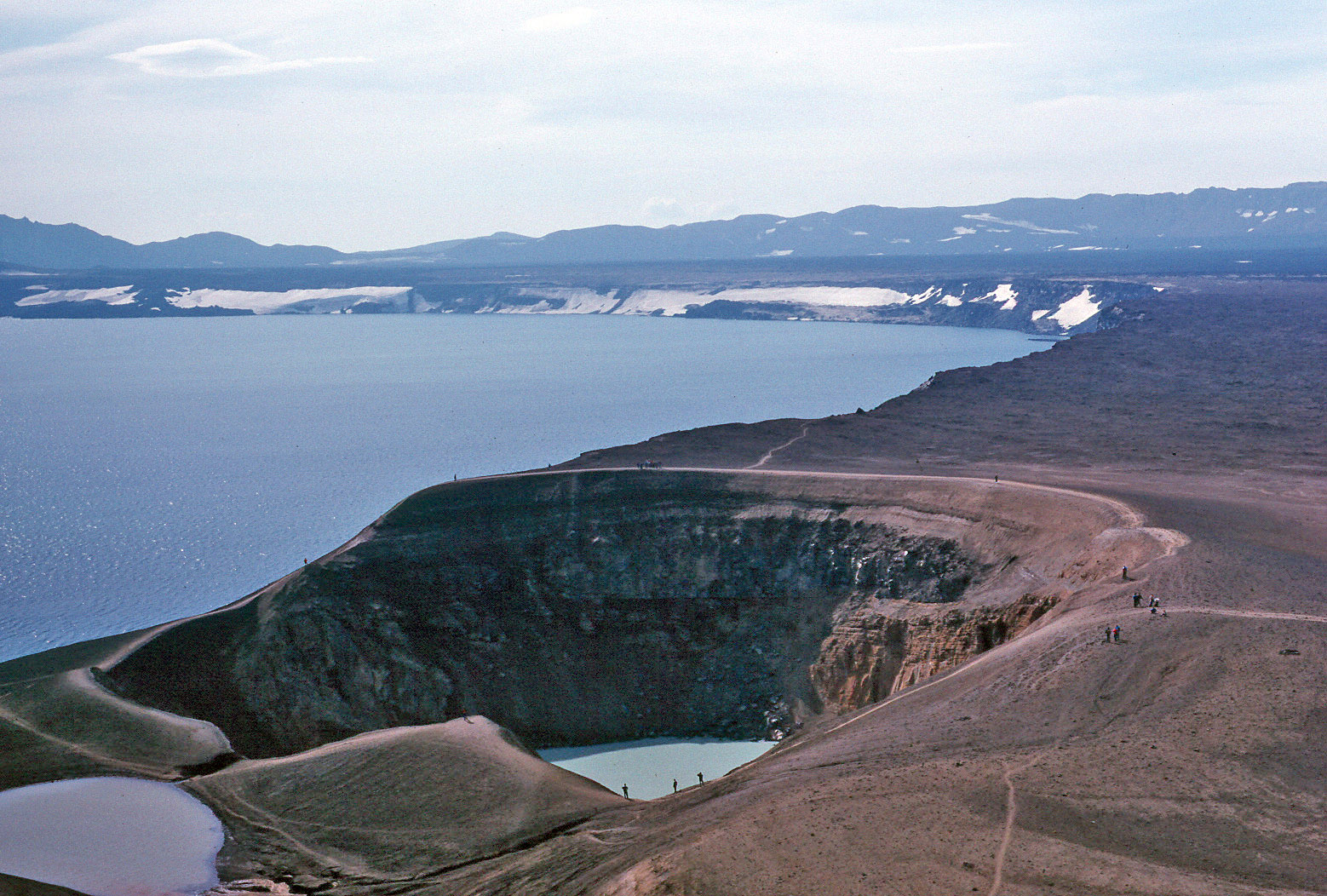
Askja and Víti (in the foreground)

Askja ([ˈasca]) is an active volcano situated in a remote part of the central highlands of Iceland. The name Askja refers to a complex of nested calderas within the surrounding Dyngjufjöll [ˈtiɲcʏˌfjœtl̥] mountains, which rise to 1,514 m (4,967 ft), askja meaning box or caldera in Icelandic.

== Geography ==
The Askja central volcano is 20 km (12 mi) in diameter and is associated with the Askja volcanic system which has a 190 km (120 mi) long fissure swarm that extends north from beneath the Vatnajökull glacier towards the north coast of Iceland. The Hrúthálsar area which is 20–30 km (12–19 mi) to the north-east is now usually regarded as part of the system.

The outer caldera of Askja, representing a prehistoric eruption, is about 50 km^{2} (19 sq mi) in area, and there is evidence of other later caldera-forming events within it. These include the main summit caldera, that is about 8 km (5.0 mi) in diameter, to its north-east the 4 km (2.5 mi) diameter Kollur caldera, and the 1875 Öskjuvatn caldera with a diameter of about 5 km (3.1 mi). The main crater floor lies at about 1,100 m (3,600 ft).

The central volcano region is only accessible for a few months of the year. Being situated in the rain shadow to the northeast of the Vatnajökull glacier, the area receives only about 450 mm (18 in) of rainfall annually.

=== NASA ===
The area was used by NASA during training for the Apollo program to prepare astronauts for the lunar missions. Their main objective in Askja was to study geology. The Astronaut Monument in Húsavík lists the 32 astronauts who participated.

== Eruptions ==
Most eruptions are small, basaltic and effusive. There have been at least 175 eruptions from the Askja system in the last 7200 years.

=== 1961 ===
The last eruption of Askja was between 26 October and 5 December 1961 near the northern rim of the caldera. It produced the 0.1 km^{3} (0.024 cu mi) basaltic Vikrahraun lava flow and also near the caldera another local permafrost layer under the 0.004 km^{3} (0.00096 cu mi) of tephra.

=== 1875 ===
Askja was virtually unknown until a large 17 hour subplinian eruption which started on March 28, 1875. The volcanic system had been active since 1 January 1875. This was followed by the devastating rhyolitic phreatoplinian explosion on March 29, 1875, which erupted 0.33 km^{3} (0.079 cu mi) dense-rock equivalent. The eruption finished on 17 October 1875. Locally around the caldera this ash fall on snow cover has resulted in the formation of a layer of permafrost ice. Especially in the Eastfjords of Iceland, the ashfall was heavy enough to poison the land and kill livestock. Ash more than 1 cm in thickness covered 5,000 km^{2} (1,900 sq mi) and the total population in Iceland of sheep declined by 2% and cattle by 6.2% between 1874 and 1876. At least 16 farms were abandoned in 1876. Ash, or tephra from this eruption was wind-blown to Norway, Sweden, Germany and Poland. The eruption triggered a spike in emigration from Iceland but not as much as the Grímsvötn eruptions in the 1880s. Between February and October 1875 about 60 km (37 mi) north of the Askja central volcano there were episodic basaltic fissure eruptions, which erupted a comparable volume of magma to the explosive phase. The eruption had no direct effect on regional or Northern Hemisphere vegetation and climate.

=== Early Holocene ===
Another less well-known large rhyolitic eruption, called Askja-S (Skolli), occurred in the early Holocene, 10,824 ± 97 years BP. Tephra from this eruption has been found in south-east Sweden, Northern Ireland and north Norway and recently as far south as Romania, which makes it one of the most far-travelled Icelandic tephras.

=== Summary ===
List of Recent Eruptions
Start Date	End Date	VEI	Scale	Tephra volume (km^{3})	Comments
October 26, 1961	December 5, 1961	2	Small	0.004	
December 19, 1938	Unknown	2	Small	Unknown	
July 15, 1926		2	Moderate	Unknown	Lasted about 45 days, Thorvaldshraun lava
1924	Unknown	0	Small	Unknown	
January 15, 1923		0	Small	Unknown	Lasted about 45 days
November 1922	Unknown	0	Small	Unknown	
March 1921	Unknown	0	Small	Unknown	
1919	Unknown	2	Small	Unknown	
January 1, 1875	October 17, 1875	5	Major	1.8	Lava flows mainly south and north-east of Öskjuvatn caldera
1797	Unknown	0	Small	Unknown	Lava flow on west caldera margin dated as to before 1873 by tephra studies
1717	Unknown	-	Small	Unknown	Older than 1717 from tephra studies with lava flows on north-east caldera margin
1619	Unknown	-	Small	Unknown	Older than 1619 from tephra studies with lava flows on north caldera margin
1510	Unknown	-	Small	Unknown	Older than 1510 from tephra studies with lava flows to west caldera margin
1477	Unknown	-	Small	Unknown	Older than 1477 from tephra studies with lava flows around caldera margin
1300	Unknown	1	Small	Unknown	Older than 1341 from tephra studies with lava flows to north-east
1158	Unknown	-	-	Unknown	Older than 1158 from tephra studies with lava flows to north-east
1104	Unknown	-	-	Unknown	Older than 1104 from tephra studies with lava flows to immediate north-east of caldera
871	Unknown	-	-	Unknown	Older than 871 from tephra studies with lava flow to south-east of caldera
1250 ± 300 BCE	Unknown	0	Major	Unknown	Older than 1045 BC from tephra studies with large lava fields north and south of caldera
2050 ± 500 BCE	Unknown	0	Small	Unknown	Older than 2285 BC from tephra studies
3750 BCE	Unknown	-	-	Unknown	Basalt tephra A5700 from Torfdalsvatn
8874 ± 97 BCE	Unknown	5	Major	Unknown	1.5 ± 0.5 km3 DRE

=== Activity ===
In June 2010, Volcano expert Hazel Rymer said seismic activity was increasing at Askja. The increased earthquake activity was located to the northeast of the central volcano, in the direction of Herðubreið. It was ruled out that any activity from Eyjafjallajökull was responsible for the increase in activity at Askja. The news came as scientists continue to watch Katla. In early April 2012 it was noted that the lake in the caldera was totally clear of ice, which usually does not happen until in June or July in a normal year. It was believed that increased geothermal activity in the volcano is heating the lake. Travel in the area was restricted until further research could be carried out.

In early September 2021, GPS and Satellite data showed that an inflation at the rate of five cm per month, most likely attributed to magma intrusion, of the caldera had started in August. An Article published on September 9 from the Icelandic Meteorological Office(IMO) stated the Aviation Color Code was upgraded from "Green" to "Yellow" due to the changes. The Article also says, "Next week IMO and the Institute of Earth Sciences (UÍ) will potentiate the monitoring network around Askja to allow a better coverage and surveillance of the volcano." On 9 November 2022 deformation data showed continuing magma accumulation at depth, with accumulated uplift of 40 cm (16 in) since August 2021.

== Öskjuvatn lake ==
Öskjuvatn is a large lake that fills much of the smaller caldera resulting from the 1875 eruption. Its surface lies about 50 m (160 ft) below the level of the main caldera floor and covers about 12 km^{2} (4.6 sq mi). When the lake originally formed it was warm, but today it is frozen over for most of the year. Öskjuvatn is the second deepest lake in Iceland at 220 m (720 ft) deep.

== Missing scientists ==
In 1907, the German scientists Walter von Knebel and Max Rudloff visited Askja to study the caldera. While exploring Öskjuvatn in a small boat, they disappeared without a trace. Von Knebel's fiancée Ina von Grumbkow led an expedition to search for them, but no indication of what happened to them was ever found. Recent observations on the effects of a landslide, on 21 July 2014, has led to renewed speculation that the scientists were killed by a similar sudden event, a massive wave similar to the one estimated to be 30 meters (98 feet) high seen in 2014.

== Social context of 1875 Askja eruption ==
The eruption took place at a time that Iceland was newly self governing under Danish rule, with a strong nationalist element, had a large rural agricultural population, and needed the fodder ruined by the eruption to overwinter livestock, in an up to then, relatively prosperous farming area. Following local publicity of the plight of farming communities in May 1775, and a letter to The Times in July 1775, fund-raising efforts in the UK, Denmark, and Norway took place and relief supplies were organised. The combined donations helped many of the most affected and paid for fodder to help keep livestock alive over the winter of 1875/6. The emigration options were limited, as the possibility of organised self funded emigration from Iceland to Canada or Brazil only became possible in January 1873, and by the time of the eruption the experiences reported home of the emigrants were far from all being positive. Canada in particular successfully promoted itself and addressed partially the initial issues, with partially subsidised emigration that excluded deliberately the Icelandic poor, for multiple reasons both commercial and social. However the Iceland nationalist political movement tried to block emigration, even misrepresenting that its new Emigration Law made the Canadian plan impossible, when the law had yet to be ratified in Denmark. A deposit paid to the Danish Governor of Iceland and advertising emphasising the impact of the eruption eased the Canadian plan. While most emigration in 1876 was by Icelanders resident outside the areas most affected by the ash it did result in up to 10% of the population in those districts most affected, leaving Iceland.

== Sights and tourism in the area ==
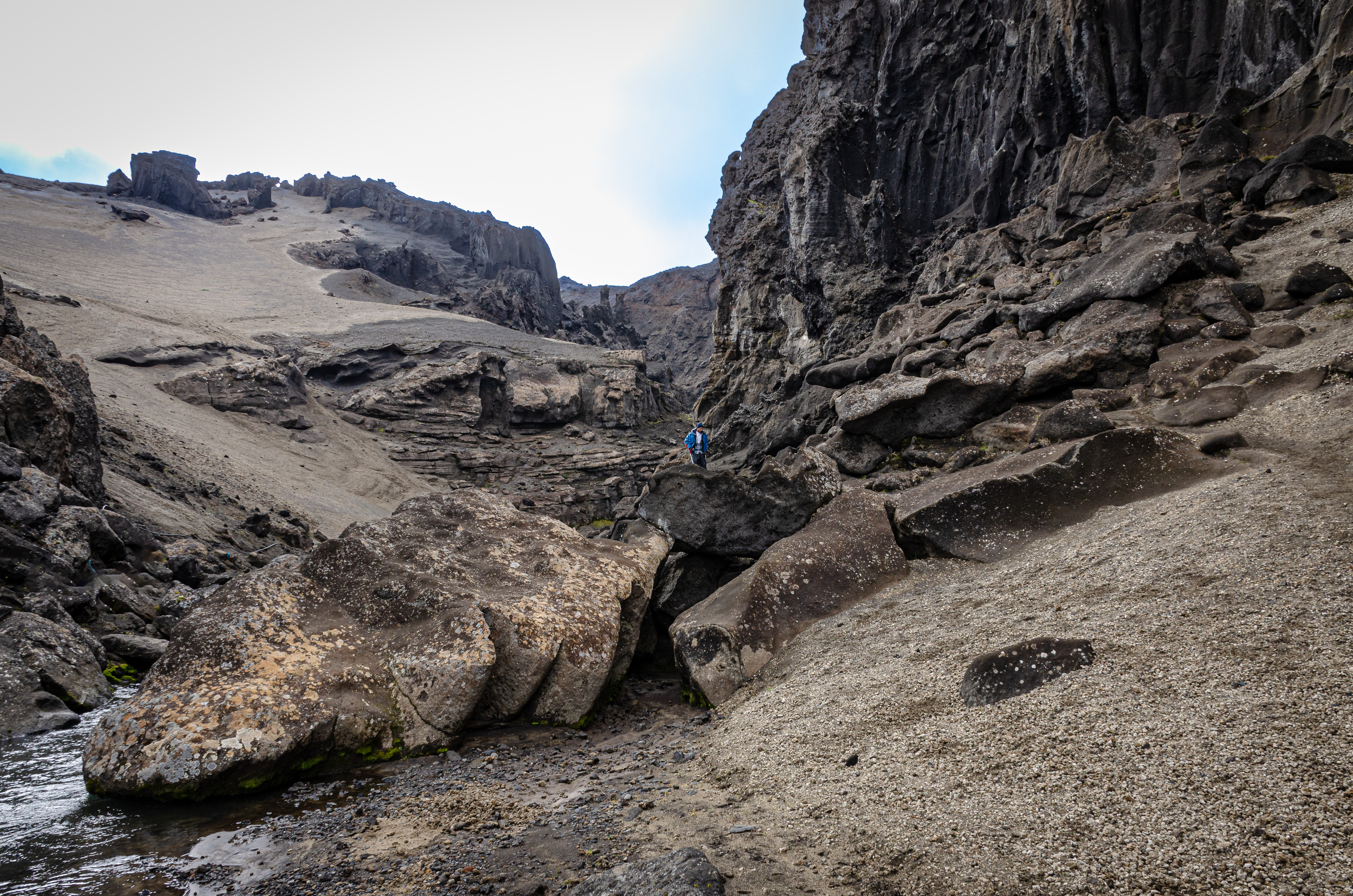
Drekagil canyon

The Dyngjufjöll mountains which surround the Askja caldera, also contain the Drekagil [ˈtrɛːkaˌcɪːl̥], the canyon of dragons. Within 25 km (16 mi) and 41 km (25 mi) of Askja, are two other volcanic systems: Herðubreið and Kverkfjöll.

Askja is a popular tourist destination. There are two mountain huts and a campsite at Dreki [ˈtrɛːcɪ], by Drekagil, which is about 100 km (62 mi) by a 4x4 F-road, from the Icelandic ring-road. The road continues 8 km (5.0 mi) up from Dreki into the Askja caldera. It is a walk of about 2.5 km (1.6 mi) from the car park to Öskjuvatn and Víti [ˈviːtɪ]. The roads are usually only open for about three to four months, from late June until early October.

== See also ==
- Geography of Iceland
- Iceland plume
- List of glaciers of Iceland
- List of lakes of Iceland
- List of rivers of Iceland
- Volcanism of Iceland
  - List of volcanic eruptions in Iceland
  - List of volcanoes in Iceland
