= List of museums in Iceland =

This is a list of museums in Iceland.

- Akranes Folk Museum
- Akureyri Art Museum
- Árbæjarsafn
- Aurora Reykjavík
- Aviation Museum of Iceland
- Borgarnes Museum Safnahús Borgarfjarðar
- Bobby Fischer Center
- Center for Icelandic Art
- Duus Museum
- Galleri Sudurgata 7
- Gljúfrasteinn
- Gufunes
- Höfn Glacier Museum
- Húsavík Whale Museum
- Icelandic Museum of Design and Applied Art (Hönnunarsafn Íslands)
- The Icelandic Museum of Rock 'n' Roll
- Icelandic Phallological Museum
- ICGV Óðinn
- Museum of Icelandic Sorcery and Witchcraft
- National Gallery of Iceland
- National Museum of Iceland
- Ósvör Maritime Museum
- Perlan
- Reykjasafn (Byggðasafn Húnvetninga og Strandamanna)
- Reykjavík 871±2
- Reykjavik Art Museum
- Reykjavik Maritime Museum
- Reykjavík Municipal Archives
- Safnasafnid Icelandic Folk and Outsider Art Museum
- Skagafjörður Folk Museum
- Skóbúðin - museum of everyday life
- Technical Museum of East Iceland
- The Transportation Museum at Ystafell
- The Árnesinga Folk Museum
- The Herring Era Museum
- Vikin Maritime Museum
- The Arctic Fox Center
- The Exploration Museum
- Þjóðveldisbærinn Stöng
- Viking World museum
  - Íslendingur
- Volcano House
- Westfjords Heritage Museum
- Whales of Iceland

== See also ==
- List of museums
- Tourism in Iceland
- Culture of Iceland
