= Axel Sveinsson =

Icelandic civil engineer

- Born: April 3, 1896; Bergsholti in Staðarveit, Snaefellsnessyslu
- Died: August 12, 1957 (aged 61)
- Known for: Lighthouse Designs
- Spouses: Aðalbjorg Sigurbjornsdottir, Guðrun Olafia Sigurðardottir, Oddny Lára Emilia Petursdóttir,
- Scientific career
- Fields: Civil engineer

Axel Sveinsson (3 April 1896 – 12 August 1957) was an Icelandic civil engineer. He received his engineering degree in Copenhagen in 1927.

He is known for having designed several lighthouses in Iceland; these include the lighthouses at Hólmsberg, Garðskagi, Þrídrangar and Knarrarós. A postage stamp depicting the Vattarnes lighthouse at Reyðarfjörður, which Axel designed, was issued in 2013.
