= Arborg =

Arborg is the name of several places in the world:

- Arborg, Manitoba, a town in Manitoba, Canada
- Árborg, a municipality in Iceland
