= Stokkseyri =

Town in South Constituency, Iceland

- Town
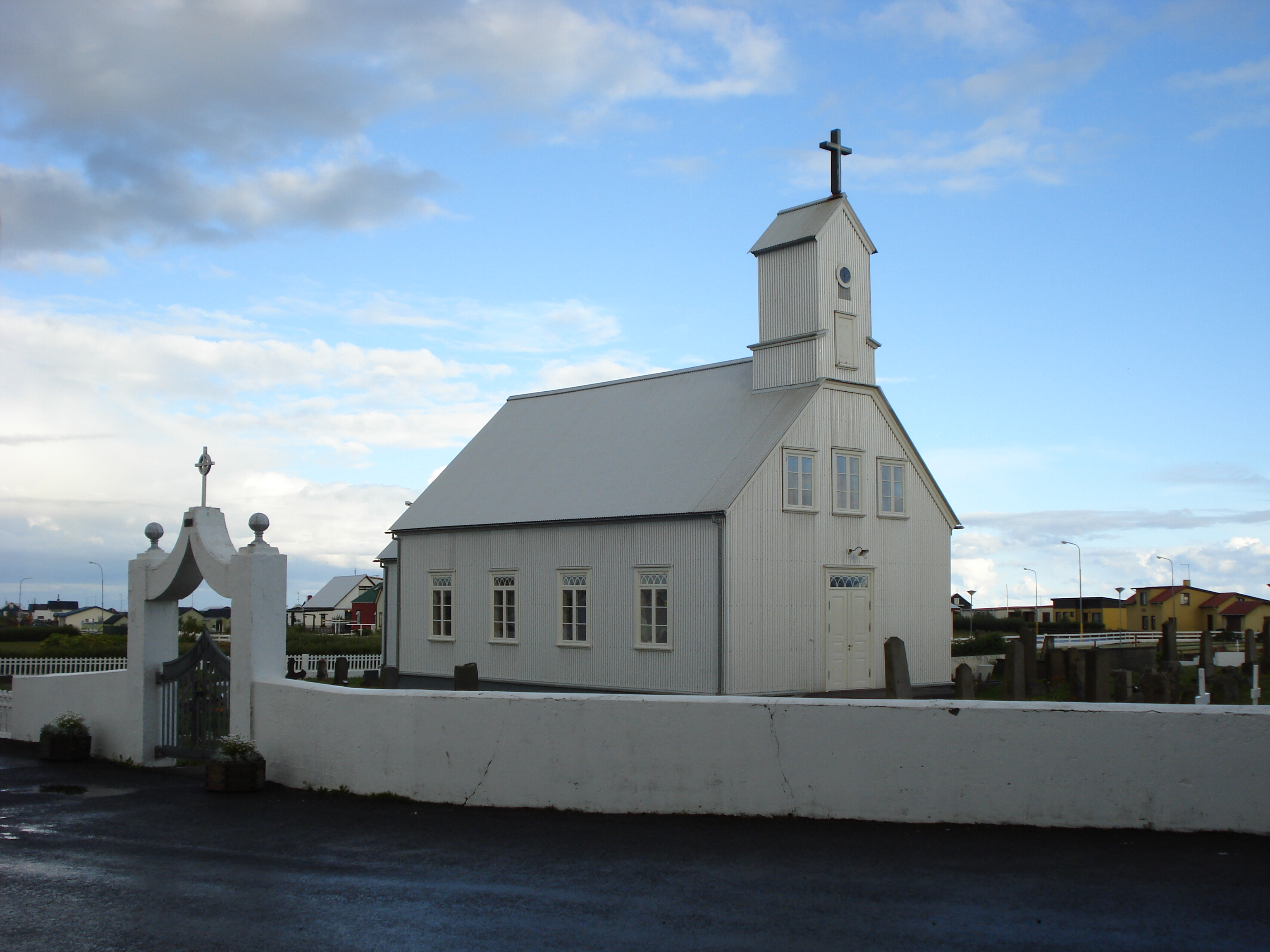
- The church of Stokkseyri

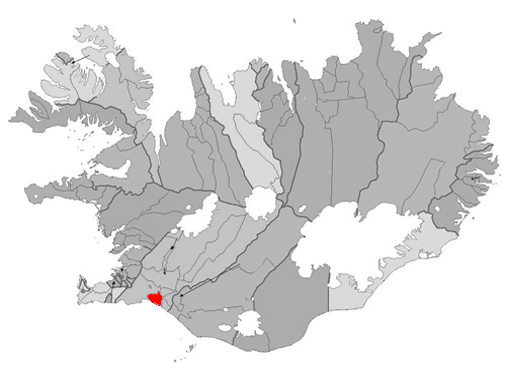
- Location of the Municipality of Árborg

- Location in Iceland
- Coordinates: 63°50′N 21°03′W
- Country: Iceland
- Constituency: South Constituency
- Region: Southern Region
- Municipality: Árborg

Population (2011)
  - Total: 445
- Time zone: UTC+0 (GMT)
- Website: Official website

Stokkseyri (Icelandic pronunciation: [ˈstɔksˌeiːrɪ]) is a small town in Árborg in Southern Iceland, 10 kilometres (6.2 mi) southwest of Selfoss. It has a population of around 445.

== Overview ==
Founded around 900 AD by the settler Hásteinn Atlason, it was an important fishing and trading village in previous times. The town is founded on the Great Þjórsá lava.

The local school is Barnaskólinn á Eyrarbakka og Stokkseyri.

The artistic experimental duo Jónsi & Alex wrote a song named after the town which appears on their album Riceboy Sleeps. In 1949, a replica of a fisherman's hut was erected in honor of Foreman Thuridur.

The Knarraros lighthouse, which is a unique blend of functionalism and Art Nouveau style, is located about 5 km (3.1 mi) away.

A famous inhabitant of Stokkseyri was Stokkseyrar-Dísa.

It is home to the football team UMF Stokkseyri.
