= Foreman Thuridur =

Icelandic sea captain and foreman

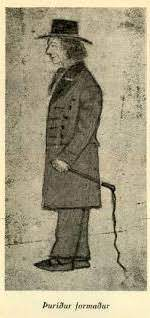
Thurídur as an adult.

Þuríður Einarsdóttir (Thurídur Einarsdottir), commonly known as Foreman Thurídur or Þuríður formaður, (1777 – 13 November 1863) was an Icelandic sea captain. Unusually for a woman, for over half a century she worked as an increasingly renowned fisherman, first as a deckhand then taking command of boats as "foreman", the term traditionally used for captain in Iceland. She is also known for helping to identify those behind the infamous Kambur robbery in 1827.

== Early life ==
Born on the Stéttar (or Stéttir) farm near the village of Eyrarbakki in 1777, Þuríður Einarsdóttir was the daughter of Helga Bjarnadóttir and Einar Eiríksson, a farmer and a fisherman. She lived with her parents until she was 25. When she was 11, she started fishing on her father's boat in the spring.

Following her father's death in the early 1790s, she fished both in the spring and autumn with her brother Bjarni. Finally, when in her twenties, she became a fully competent seafarer, able to go out in winter too with Foreman Jón in Móhús. Typically, the foreman of a fishing boat commanded a crew of about 15. At the time, the boats had no sails, and were propelled with oars. While working, she dressed as a man.

== Career ==
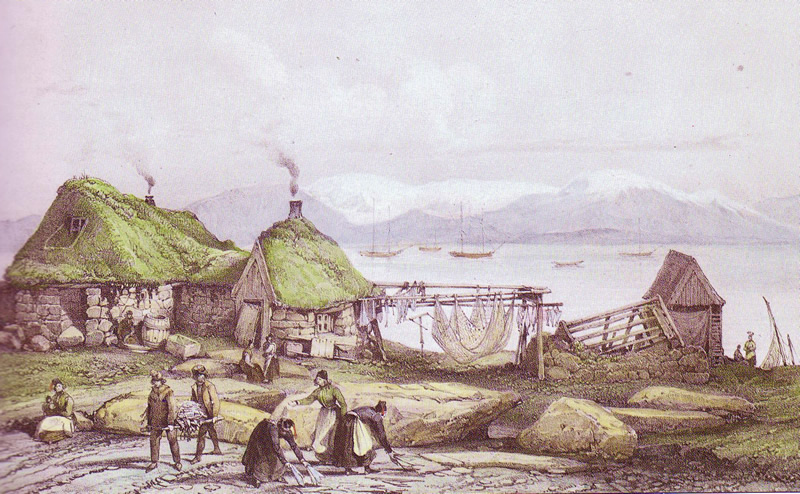
Icelandic fisherman's hut (1836).

During the years 1802 to 1847, she spent most of her time on fishing boats, quickly developing her seamanship. Until 1830, she lived around Stokkseyri, spending a lengthy period at her farm, Gata. It was during this period that she became a fishing boat foreman, first during the spring and autumn seasons. From 1816 onwards during the winter season, she served as a foreman in Þorlákshöfn.

Thurídur was considered a skillful and careful captain who was popular among her crew. She had a successful career, and moved around along the south coast during her working life. Later in life, she earned her living working on a small farm. For two years, she lived with Erlendur Þorvarðarson in Eystri Móhús. Their daughter Þórdis died when she was five. In 1820, she married 21-year-old Jón Egilsson, one of her workers, but the marriage did not last.

After 1830, she lived mainly in Eyrarbakki, but spent the years 1840–1847 working for merchants in Hafnarfjörður. While in Þorlákshöfn, she headed an eight-oar boat, proving to be a successful fisher.

== Kambur robbery ==
Thurídur is also known for having helped the authorities identify those involved in the infamous Kambur robbery in 1827. She recognized the pattern on a shoe dropped by one of the robbers, and the mark of an anvil on an iron rod found at the site as having been crafted in a smithy belonging to Jón Geirmundsson in Stéttar. He turned out to be one of the robbers.

== Later life ==
She retired in 1856, and when she stopped working, she received financial support from the parish.

Remaining surprisingly healthy until the end of her days, Þuríður Einarsdóttir died on 13 November 1863 in Einarshöfn at the age of 83. It is thought that she died of a heart attack.

== Memorial ==
In 1949, a replica of a turf-roofed fisherman's hut called Þuríðarbúð was erected in Stokkseyri in her memory. Close to the site of her own hut, it can be visited as a small museum.
