= Dyrhólaey =

Bird cliff in southern Iceland

Coordinates: 63°23′59″N 19°07′35″W

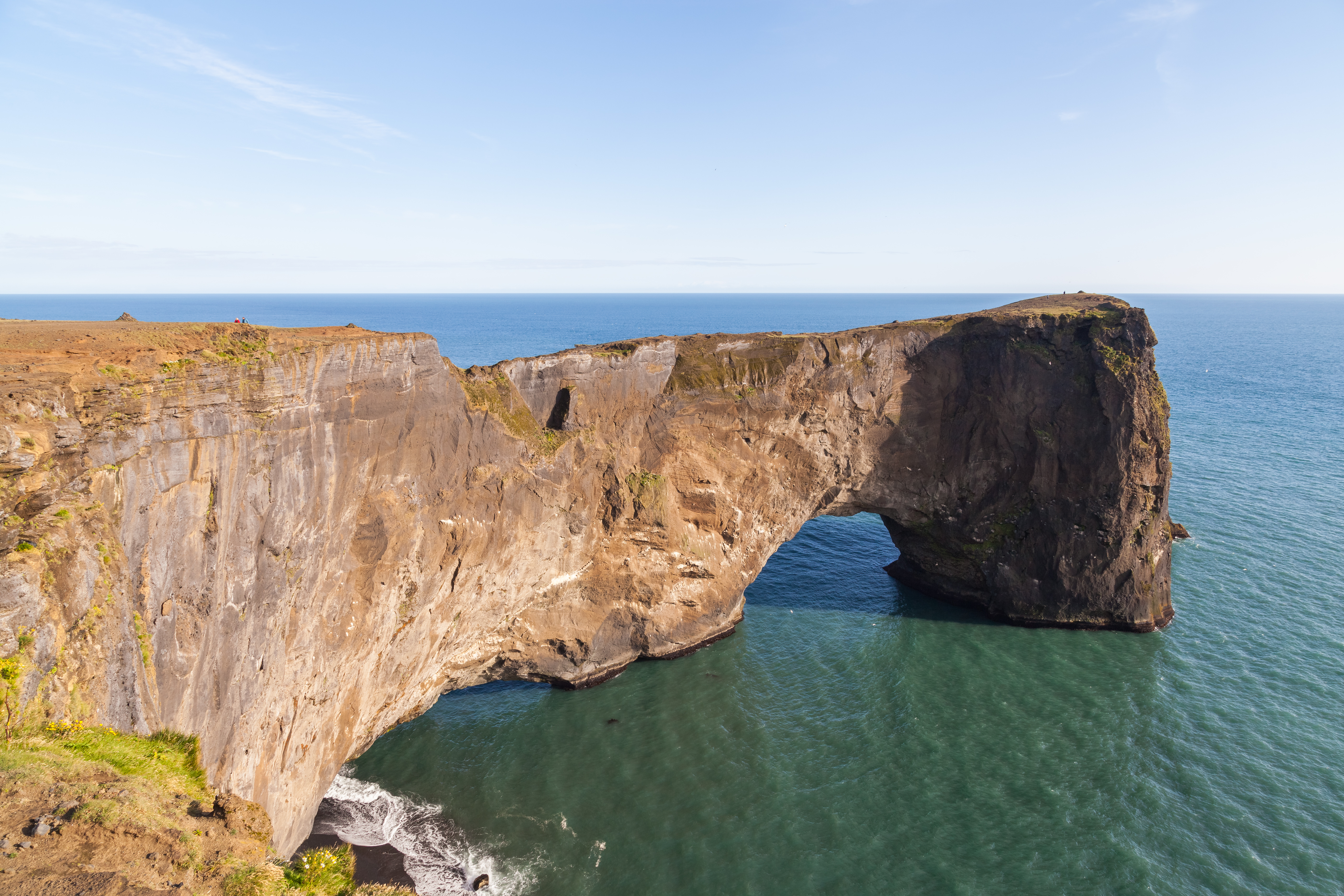
Dyrhólaey

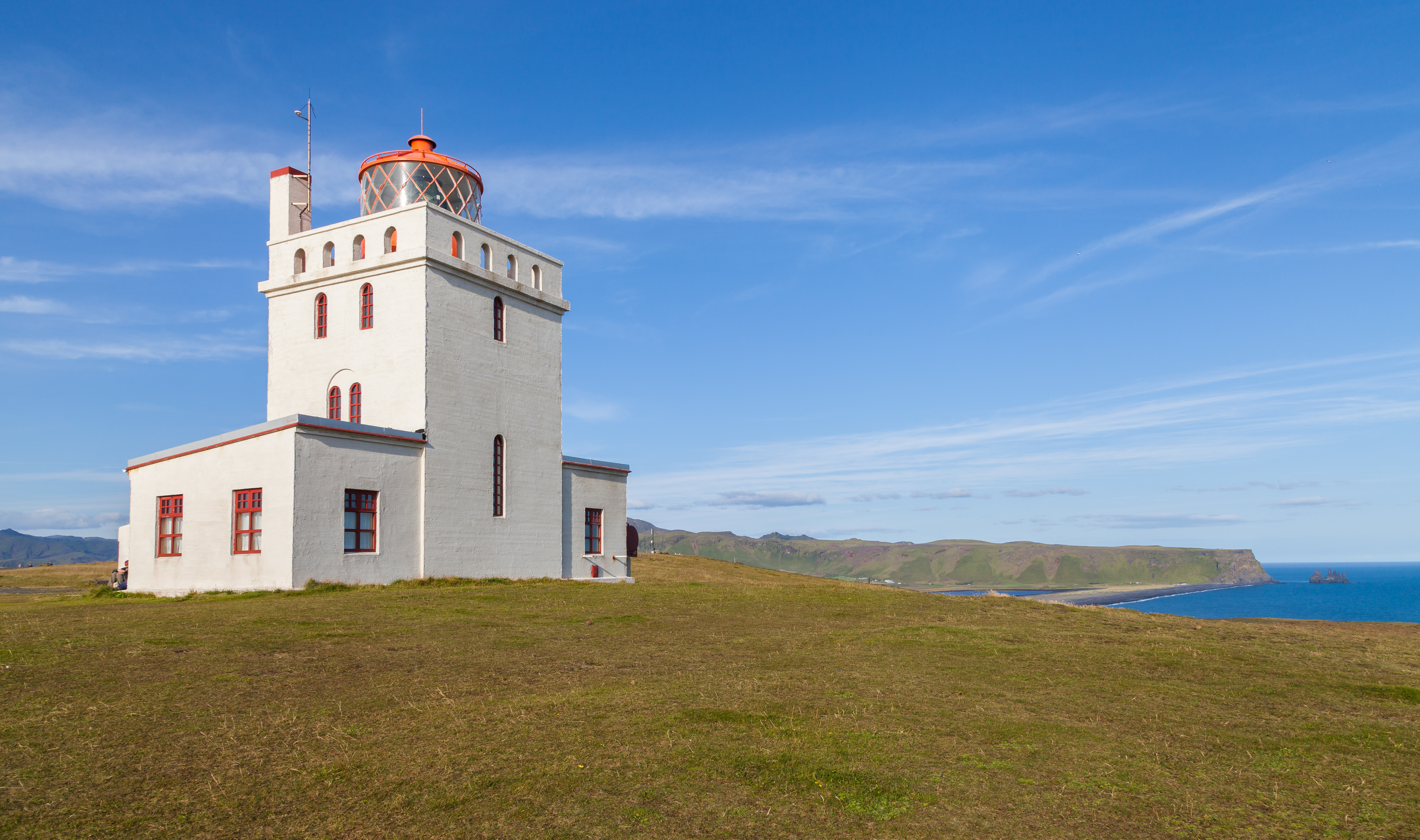
Dyrhólaey Lighthouse

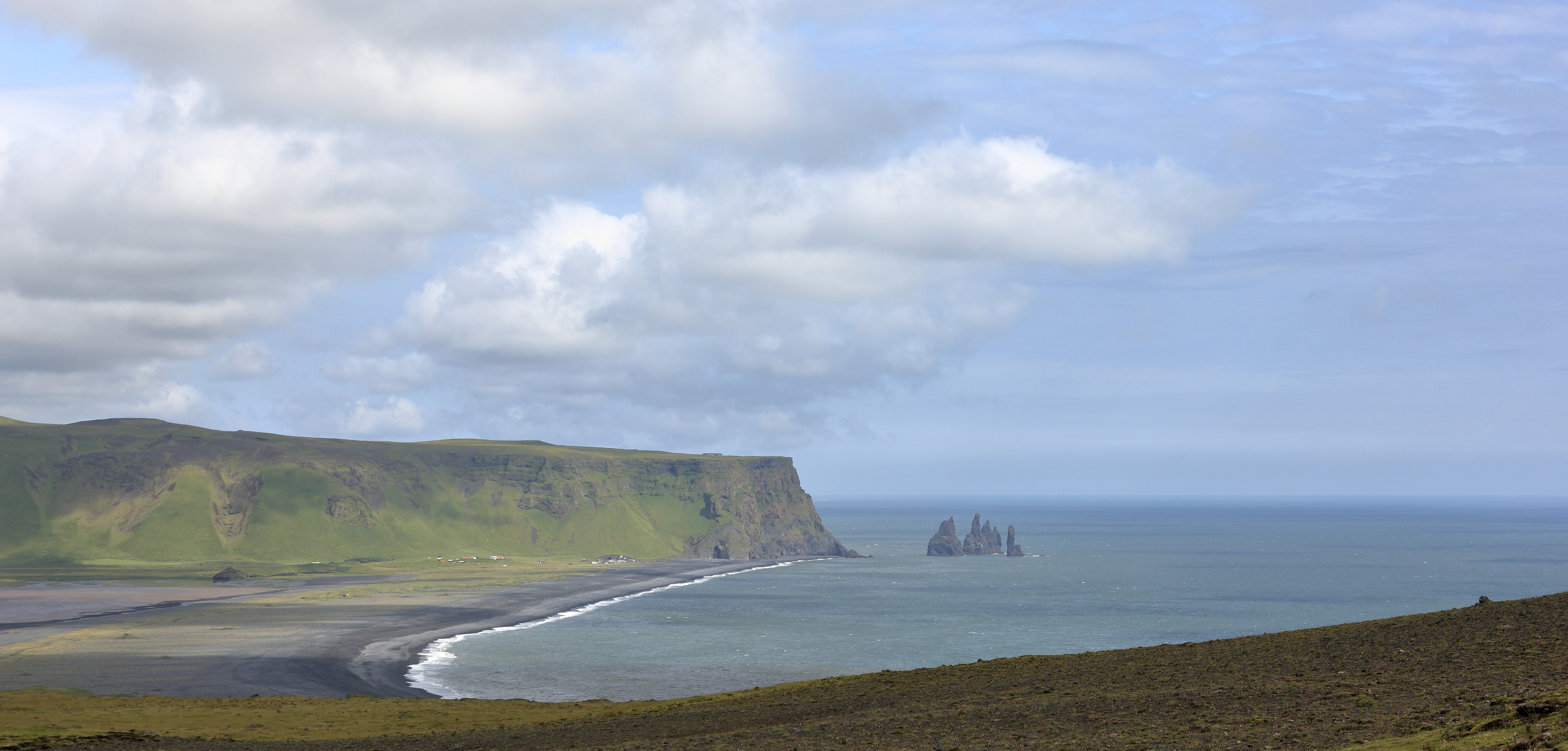
Reynisfjara and Reynisdrangar as seen from Dyrhólaey

Dyrhólaey (Icelandic pronunciation: [ˈtɪrˌhouːlaˌeiː], "door hill island"), formerly known by seamen as Cape Portland, is a small promontory located on the south coast of Iceland, not far from the village Vík. It was formerly an island of volcanic origin, which is also known by the Icelandic word eyja [ˈeiːja] meaning island. The volcano erupted about 100 thousand years ago during the Pleistocene. The peninsula has an elevation of 120 metres (390 ft), and the Dyrhólaey Lighthouse, built in 1927, sits at the top of the formation facing the sea.

It is commonly asserted that Dyrhólaey is the most southernly point in Iceland, in fact, Kötlutangi (63°23'N, 018°45'W) on the sands to the east of Dyrhólaey, is the southernmost point of mainland Iceland. Surtsey, part of the Westman Islands archipelago is the southernmost point of the country of Iceland.

The view from Dyrhólaey is broad: To the north is to be seen the big glacier Mýrdalsjökull. To the east, the black lava columns of the Reynisdrangar come out of the sea, and to the west the whole coastline in the direction of Selfoss is visible – depending on weather conditions. In front of the peninsula, there is a gigantic black arch of lava standing in the sea, which gave the peninsula its name (meaning: door hill island).

Access to Dyrhólaey is by a steep switchback road, which was rebuilt and paved in 2022.

In the summertime, many Atlantic puffins can be found nesting on the cliff faces of Dyrhólaey.

In October 1993 pilot Arngrímur Jóhannsson and member of parliament Árni Johnsen became the first to fly an airplane through the Dyrhólaey arch. They conducted three pass throughs using a Bellanca 7KCAB Citabria plane, registration TF-MBL.

== See also ==
- Volcanism of Iceland
