= Garðskagaviti =

Pair of lighthouses in southern Iceland

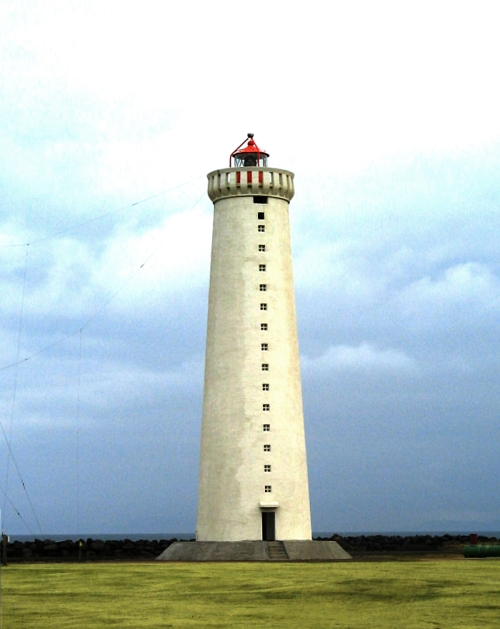
- Location: Suðurnesjabær, Iceland
- Coordinates: 64°04′55″N 22°41′24″W

Tower
- Constructed: 1944
- Racon: G

Light
- Focal height: 31 m (102 ft), 28 m (92 ft)
- Range: 15 nmi (28 km; 17 mi) (white), 10 nmi (19 km; 12 mi) (white, red, green)
- Characteristic: Fl W 5s, F WRG

Garðskagaviti (English: Garðskagi lighthouse) is a lighthouse located on Garðskaði, the easternmost tip of Iceland's Southern Peninsula. Garðskagaviti actually refers to two lighthouses: the first was built in 1897, and in 1944, a second lighthouse was built to replace the original. The newer lighthouse has been home to the Heritage and Maritime Museum since 1995.

== History ==
=== Original lighthouse ===
Plans to build a lighthouse in Garðskagi began in 1878 when Iceland, then still ruled by Denmark, petitioned the king of Denmark to finance the construction of the lighthouse, which he had promised to do. However, the Danish government was unwilling to pay the full cost of the lighthouse, claiming that not many ships passed by Garðskagi and that the weather was inhospitable to a lighthouse. Denmark eventually agreed to pay for the light fixture, but not the whole structure. The Icelanders decided to build a protective wall with lights in it in lieu of a lighthouse, but before long, the walls were eroded, and in 1895, a fishing association requested that a proper lighthouse be built. The Icelandic government provided 11,000 kronur for the project and requested that the Danish government match it, which they did.

In 1897, the Royal Danish Lighthouse Commission built Garðskagaviti. The structure is 11.4 meters tall, square, and made from iron-reinforced concrete; it is the second-oldest concrete structure in Iceland. It used a kerosene lamp and a single, catadioptric rotating lens that magnified the light and had a weighted mechanism to turn the lens.

Before long, the ocean began to erode the land on which the lighthouse was built. In 1912, a footbridge was built so people could safely access the lighthouse, but the waves and inclement weather made the bridge unusable during high tide. In 1925, a concrete platform was built to help secure the ground around the lighthouse. Despite this, the lighthouse would shake during storms because the foundation was not sturdy enough.

Since December 1, 2003, Garðskagaviti has been a protected cultural heritage site. This includes the original lighthouse and the outbuildings, as well as the stone base under the lighthouse, walkway around it, footbridge, handrails, and protective platforms around the base.

=== 1944 Lighthouse ===
Construction on the second Garðskagaviti began on June 11, 1944, and was completed in just three months. The new lighthouse is located 215 meters southeast of the old one; it was built further from the shore to avoid erosion and sea spray, which caused limited visibility in bad weather.

The new lighthouse was designed by the engineer Axel Sveinsson. Its cylindrical concrete tower is 28.6 meters tall, measured from the foundation to the top, and the walls are 20 centimeters thick. The lighthouse was originally covered in a light-colored quartz, but it was later brushed with white protective sealant during repairs in 1986. Its lantern room is in the English style and originally used the lighting elements from the old Garðskagaviti, and putting them in the new structure increased the range of the light from 13 to 15.5 nautical miles. The fixture was converted to electric lighting in 1946, just two years after construction finished. In 1960, the original lens from 1897 was replaced with a quadruple rotating lens. The lighthouse was also capable of receiving radar signals. There was a residence for the lighthouse keeper built in 1933 that was used until 1979 and still stands today. The residence is now part of the museum.

== Garðskagi Heritage and Maritime Museum ==
In 1995, the Garðskagi Heritage and Maritime museum opened in the old outbuildings near the lighthouse. The museum houses 60 engines that Guðni Ingimundarson restored, and most are still functional. Its permanent exhibits include information about farming and fishing, and a large portion of the museum is dedicated to maritime artifacts. Items on display include a nine-meter-long, six-oared boat in the engeyjarlag (Engey island style) shape built in 1887. The boat belonged to Gunnar Hámundarson's fishery, which is Iceland's oldest working fishing company.

== See also ==
- List of lighthouses in Iceland
