= Tourism in Iceland =

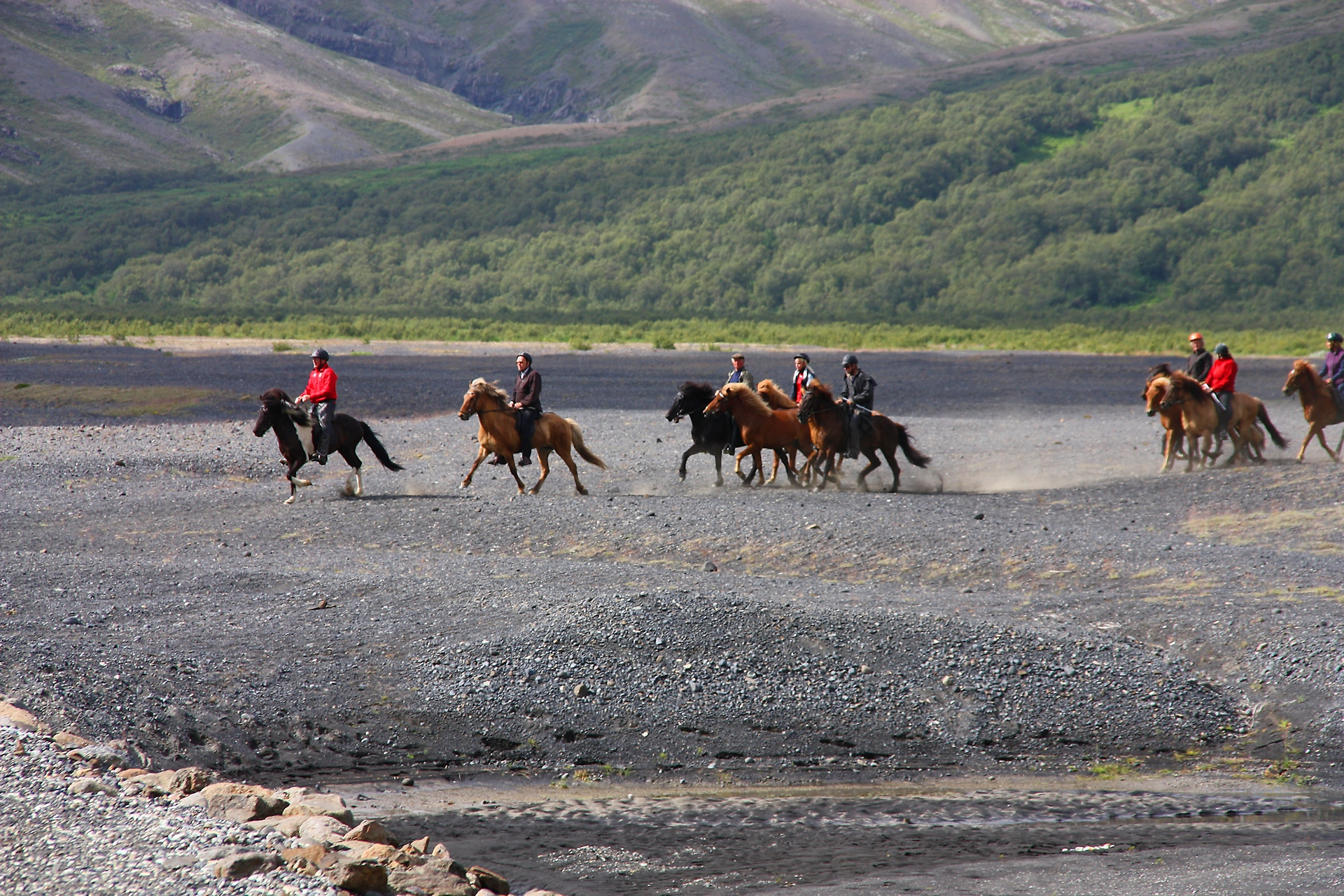
Active tourism: riding Icelandic horses in Skaftafell

Tourism in Iceland has grown considerably in economic significance. In 2025, the tourism industry accounted for 8.8% of Iceland's GDP, while the country received just under 2.3 million foreign overnight visitors.

== History ==
Evolution of the annual number of foreign visitors to Iceland compared to the growth of the resident population.

Services provided to foreign tourists were for a long time an insignificant part of the Icelandic economy, rarely contributing more than 2 percent to GDP, even long after the advent of international air travel. Until the early 1980s, the number of foreign visitors to Iceland increased slowly and erratically, never exceeding 80,000 in a single year, and for many years after that only barely kept pace with the increase in the number of Icelanders travelling to and from the country. This situation lasted until the turn of the century, when the annual number of visitors exceeded the total resident population for the first time, at around 300,000.

A few years later the Icelandic tourism industry started to experience a boom which to this day shows no signs of abating, as witnessed by the fact that the number of foreign visitors grew on average by 6 percent per year between 2003 and 2010, and by some 20 percent per year on average between 2010 and 2014. In 2015, this rapid increase has continued, with the number of foreign visitors already exceeding 1 million in the period January to October. According to the Icelandic Tourist Board, the total number of overnight stays by foreign visitors to Iceland grew from 595,000 in 2000 to 2.1 million in 2010, before rising to 4.4 million in 2014.

The number of people working in tourism-related industries in Iceland was 21,600 in 2014, representing nearly 12 percent of the total workforce, and tourism's direct contribution to GDP is now close to 5 percent.

== Tourist demographics ==
Iceland is well known for its untouched nature and unique atmosphere. Iceland receives the highest number of tourists during summer (June–August). In 2014, around 42% of visitors arrived in Iceland during its summer months, proportionally a slight decrease compared to the previous two years, the percentage of winter visitors having increased by over 4% in the same period. As of year 2014, Iceland's largest tourism markets comprises tourists from Central/South Europe, followed by those from other regions: North America, the UK, then the Nordic countries. In terms of visitors from individual countries, the top five for 2014 were the UK, USA, Germany, France and Norway. Canada had the largest percentage increase in visitor numbers in the 2013-2014 period, with an increase of over 60% year on year.

== Overtourism in Iceland ==
Overtourism in Iceland is a result of both the huge rise in visitor arrivals, and their concentration in a small area of the country. Over 98% of visitors to Iceland come through Keflavik, just 45 minutes from Reykjavik, with many using the city as a short stopover on a transatlantic flight and restricting their travel to popular nearby sites like the Blue Lagoon and the Golden Circle.

This tourism boom, centred around Reykjavik and the south, has been problematic:

- Hotel rooms in Reykjavik have not kept pace with visitor numbers, rising by 42% and 264% respectively over the same period. Short term rental sites like Airbnb have plugged the gap, increasing residential property prices, pushing local people out of central Reykjavik, and shifting downtown amenities towards tourists rather than residents.
- In the small town of Akureyri, which saw a 91% increase in cruise ship arrivals between 2015 and 2019, economic benefits have not increased in line with the increase in cruise passengers. Local cafes saw just a 3.5% increase in business during a cruise ship visit, and restaurants just a 1% increase.
- Local facilities and major tourism sites are struggling to cope with increased visitor numbers. Hiking trails are being degraded, roads now routinely used by tourist buses are deteriorating, and visitors regularly damage fragile ecosystems – like the moss that covers Thingvellir National Park.

== Popular tourist destinations ==
According to a survey carried out by the Icelandic Tourist Board in 2014, the following 10 destinations are the ones most frequently visited in Iceland, out of 39 specifically mentioned in the survey (the percentages indicate the proportion of all foreign tourists visiting the destination in question and relate to the summer season, some of the destinations being less easily accessible in winter).

Rank	Destination	Percentage
1	Capital Region	97.0%
2	Geysir/Gullfoss	59.4%
3	Þingvellir	50.4%
4	Vík	47.4%
5	Skógar	43.6%
6	Jökulsárlón (glacier lagoon)	42.3%
7	Skaftafell	40.3%
8	Akureyri	36.2%
9	Mývatn	34.0%
10	Blue Lagoon	31.5%

== Arrivals by country ==
Most visitors arriving in Iceland through the main airport are from the following countries of nationality:

Rank	Country	2015	2016	2017	2018	2019	2020	2021	2022	2023	2024
1	United States	242,805	415,287	576,403	694,814	464,059	50,958	227,093	458,014	639,337	620,396
2	United Kingdom	241,024	316,395	322,543	297,963	261,805	100,147	54,637	229,843	283,889	266,246
3	Germany	103,384	132,789	155,813	139,155	132,155	44,447	63,775	131,812	138,647	141,879
4	Canada	46,654	83,144	103,026	99,715	69,947	6,954	7,300	43,648	59,178	77,782
5	France	65,822	85,221	100,374	97,224	97,507	28,188	36,560	89,376	100,634	95,589
6	Poland	27,079	39,613	66,299	91,463	93,726	40,479	52,041	83,683	136,584	108,486
7	China	47,643	66,781	86,003	89,495	99,253	16,380	5,988	20,752	48,080	85,828
8	Spain	27,166	39,183	57,971	65,589	59,141	11,067	19,565	50,736	68,690	71,848
9	Denmark	49,225	49,951	53,240	51,019	49,280	23,218	24,239	58,746	51,521	57,659
10	Sweden	43,096	54,515	56,229	49,316	39,853	5,329	7,719	30,447	28,574	24,631
	Total foreign	1,261,938	1,767,726	2,195,271	2,315,925	1,986,153	482,108	687,691	1,696,785	2,214,182	2,261,391

== See also ==
- Iceland
- Economy of Iceland
- Elf/Huldufólk Tourism
- List of museums in Iceland
- Tourism in Denmark
- Tourism in Finland
- Tourism in Norway
- Tourism in Sweden
