= Ósvör Maritime Museum =

Museum in Bolungarvík, Westfjords, Iceland

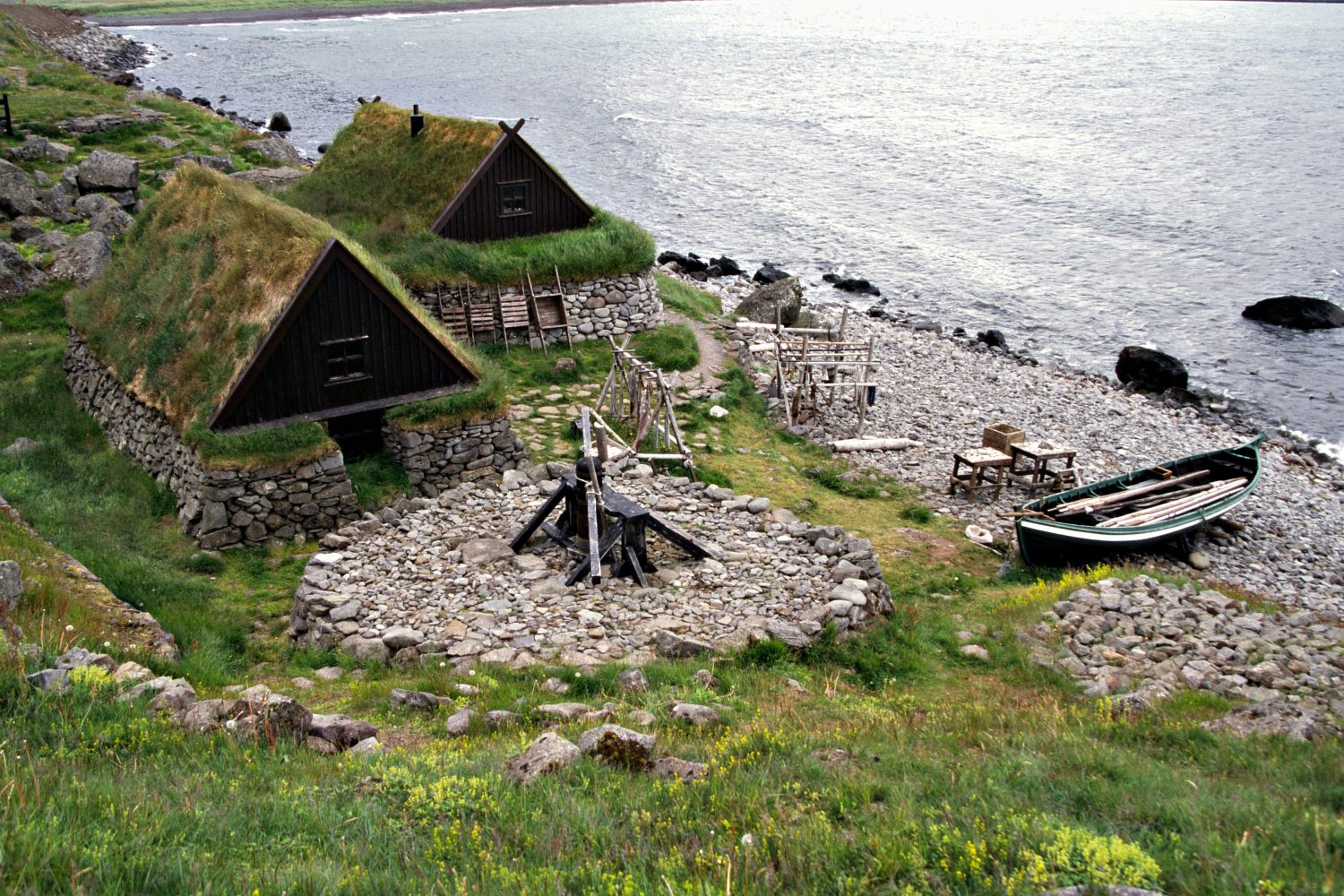

- Location within Iceland
- Established: 1988
- Location: Bolungarvík, Westfjords, Iceland
- Coordinates: 66°09′01.8″N 23°12′53.8″W
- Type: museum

The Ósvör Maritime Museum is a museum in Bolungarvík, Westfjords, Iceland.

== History ==
The museum was opened in 1988 after it was built in an old ruins of fishing huts.

== Architecture ==
The museum is a replica of an old fishing village in the country from the 19th century. The fishing huts were built with timber and stone. The main building of the museum used to be the station for fish processing. It was built of stone and turf.

== Exhibitions ==
The museum exhibits the rowing boat Ölver, crew hut, salt house and drying hut.

== See also ==
- List of museums in Iceland
