= The Transportation Museum at Ystafell =

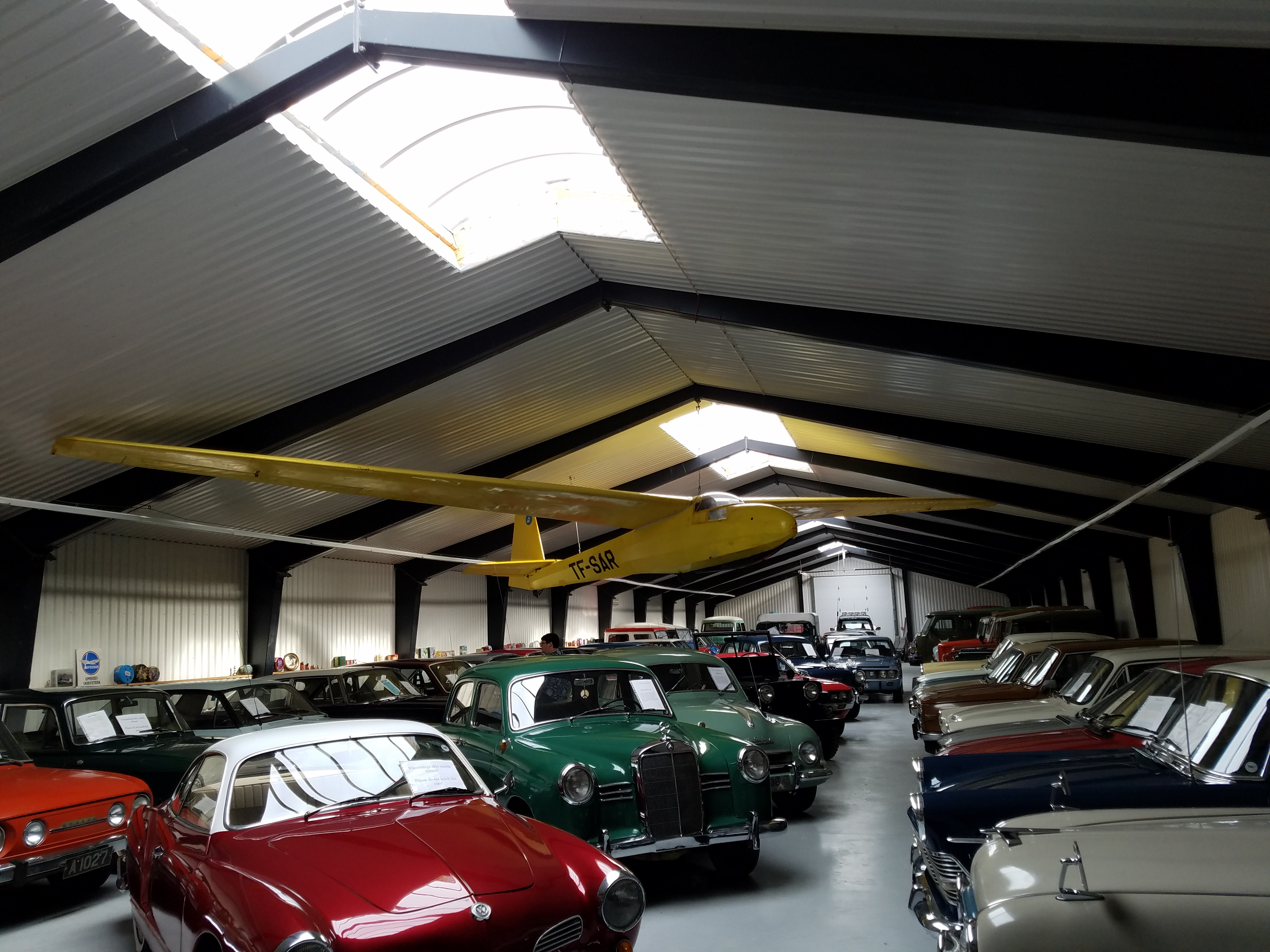
- Established: December 28, 1998
- Location: Þingeyjarsveit, Iceland
- Coordinates: 65.780526°N 17.578873°W
- Type: Automobile museum
- Collection size: 280 automobiles
- Visitors: 4,000+ expected annually
- Curator: Sverrir Ingólfsson
- Parking: On site (no charge)
- Website: www.ystafell.is

The Transportation Museum at Ystafell (Icelandic: Samgönguminjasafnið Ystafelli) is the oldest transportation museum in Iceland, established in 1998 and opened in July 2000. Located between Akureyri (~57 km) and Húsavík (~37 km) it sits in the valley Kaldakinn. The museum features a collection of historic cars and trucks, and displays about roads and road transport in Iceland.

== See also ==
- List of museums in Iceland
