= Knarrarós Lighthouse =

Lighthouse in Iceland

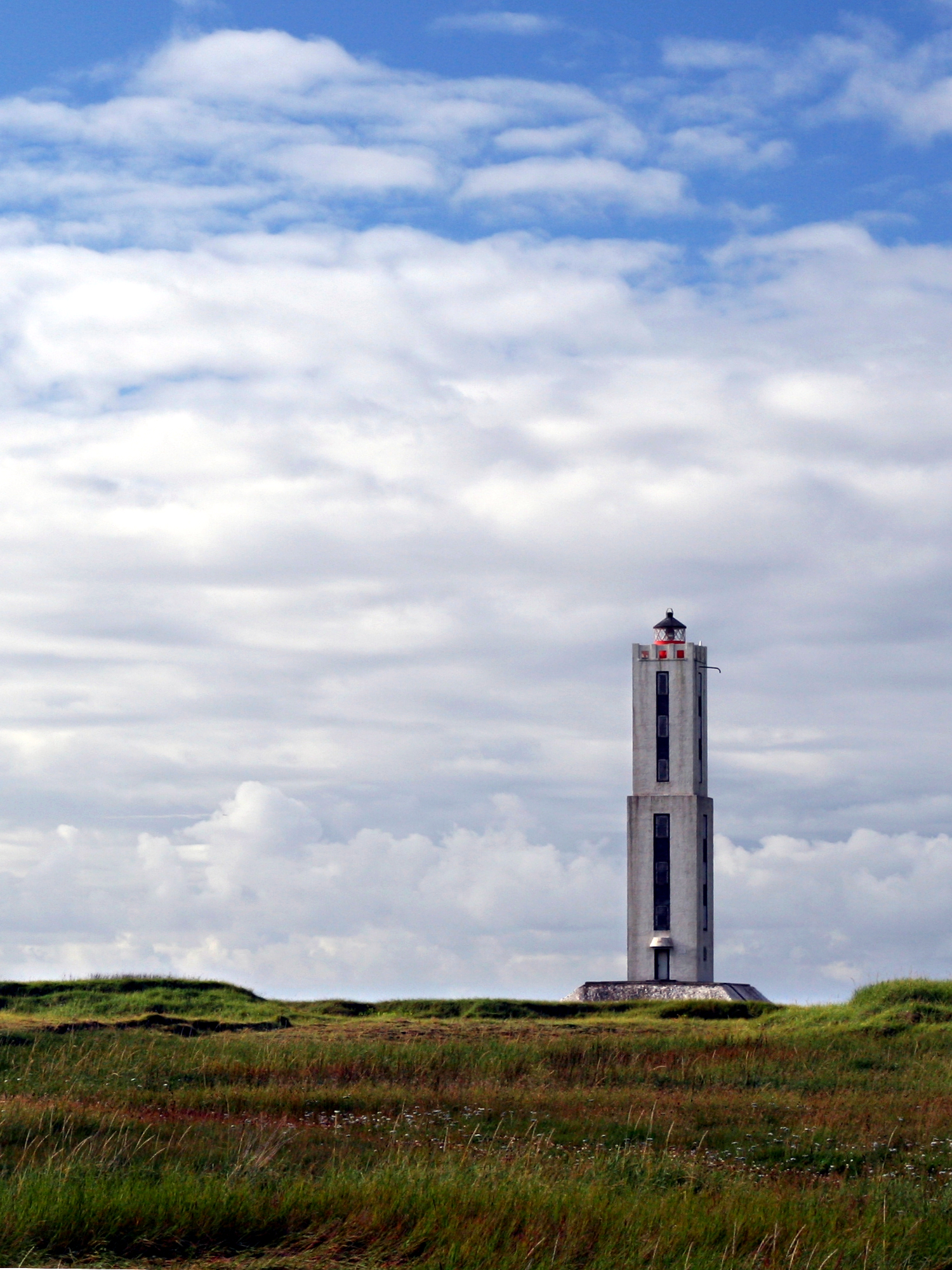
- The lighthouse in 2010
- Location: Stokkseyri, Southwest coastal Iceland
- Coordinates: 63°49′24″N 20°58′32.6″W

Tower
- Constructed: 1939
- Construction: concrete tower
- Height: 22 metres (72 ft)
- Shape: 2-stage square tower with balcony and lantern
- Markings: white unpainted tower with black vertical windows, black lantern
- Racon: M

Light
- Focal height: 30 metres (98 ft)
- Range: 16 nmi (30 km; 18 mi)
- Characteristic: LFl W 30 s
- Iceland no.: VIT-279

The Knarrarós Lighthouse (Icelandic: Knarrarósviti [ˈkʰnarrarˌouːsˌvɪːtɪ]) is located on the south coast of Iceland.

== Description ==
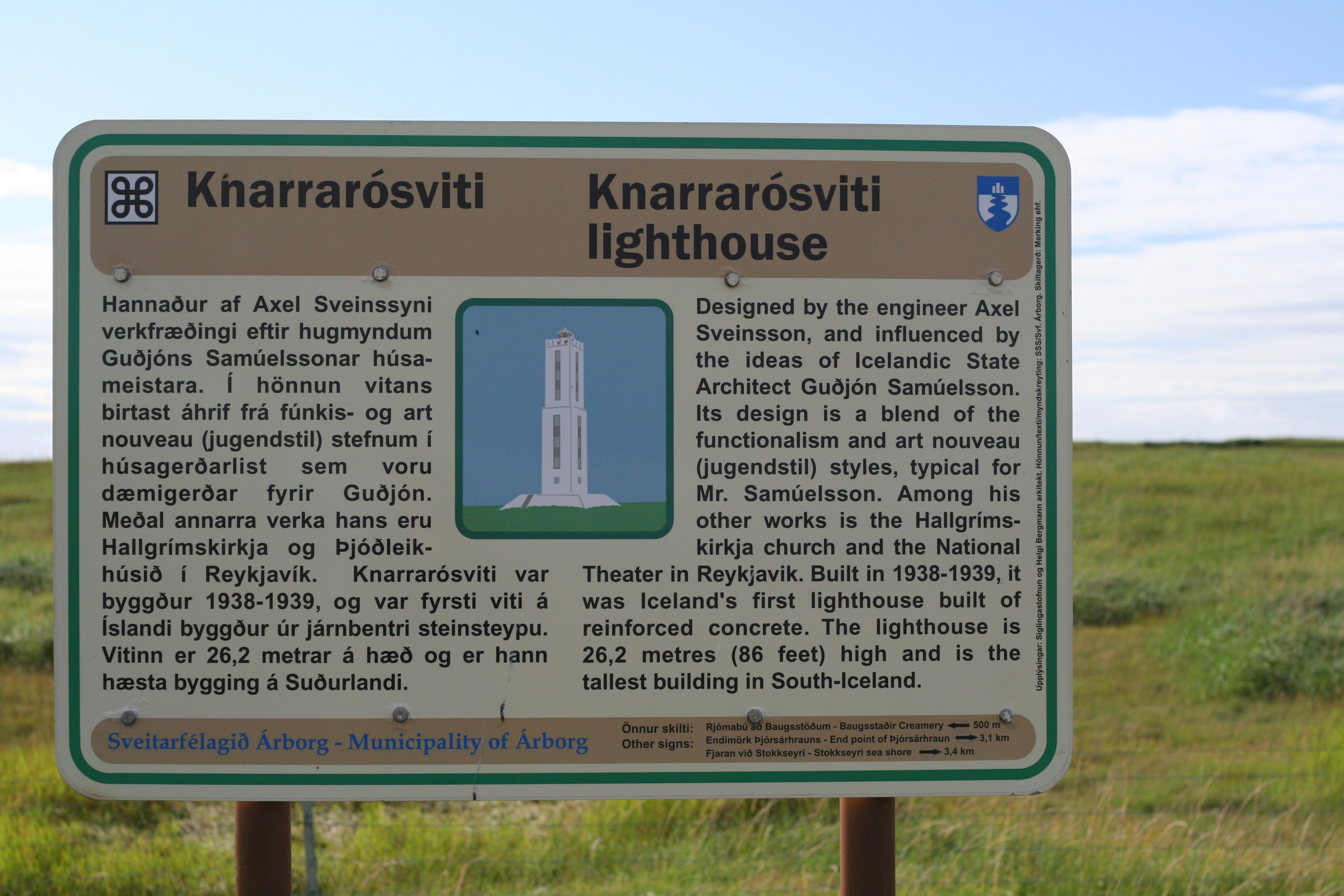
Sign at the Knarrarós Lighthouse

The square, two-staged light tower was built in 1938–1939 and was Iceland's first lighthouse built of reinforced concrete. The lighthouse was designed by Axel Sveinsson, and influenced by the ideas of Guðjón Samúelsson (1887–1950), state architect of Iceland.

The tower is 26.2 metres (86 ft) high and unpainted. There are black panels arrayed vertically between the windows that create the appearance that the tower has a black vertical stripe on each side. The design is a blend of the functionalism and Art Nouveau styles. The light characteristic is one three-second-long flash every thirty seconds.

The lighthouse is located about 5 km (3.1 mi) from the town of Stokkseyri. The site is open to visitors but the tower is closed.

The lighthouse is now automated; the last lighthouse keeper was removed in 2010.

== See also ==
- List of lighthouses in Iceland
