= Dyrhólaey Lighthouse =

Lighthouse in Iceland

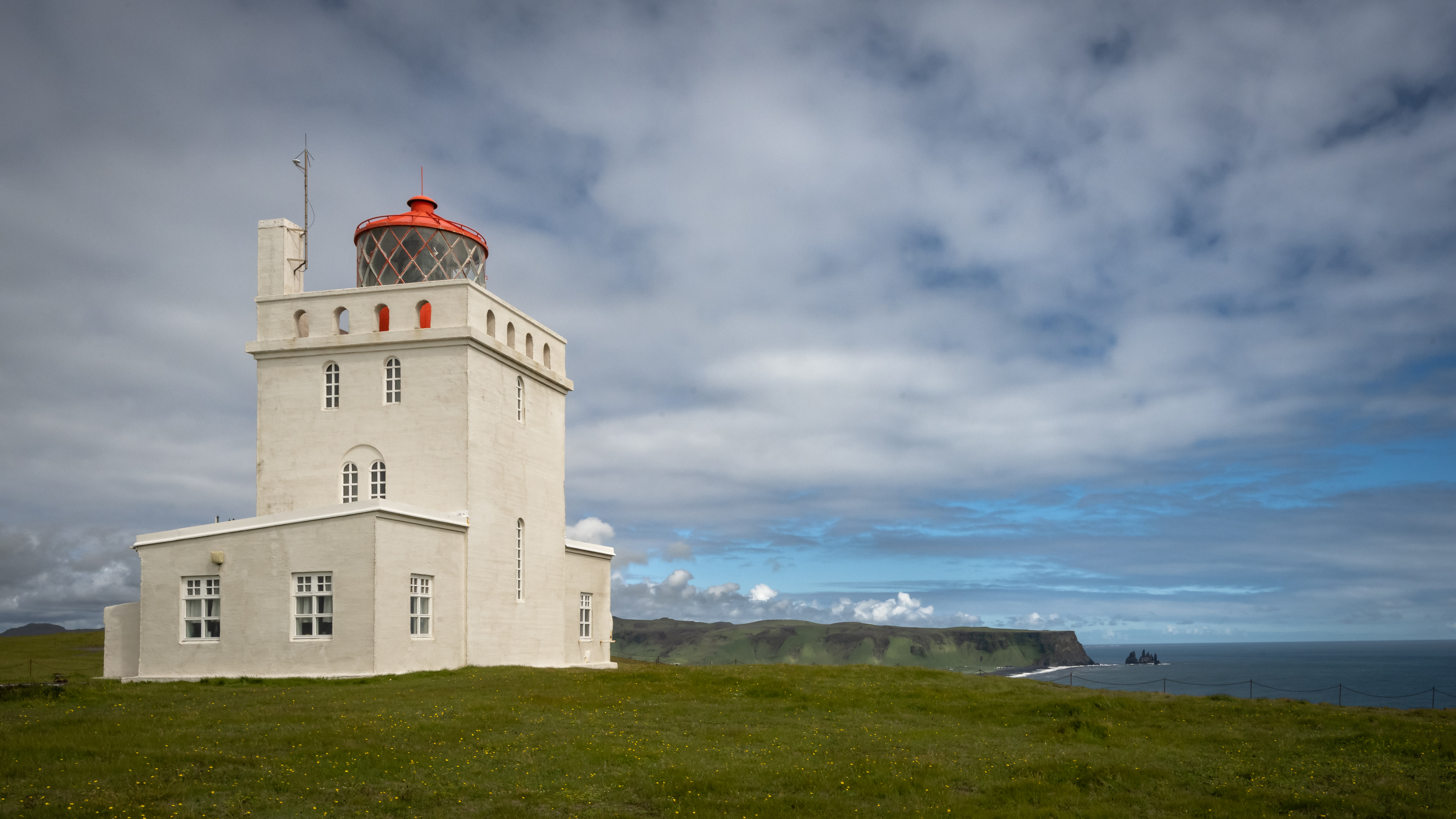
- Location: Vík í Mýrdal
- Coordinates: 63°24′10.1″N 19°07′51.4″W

Tower
- Constructed: 1910 (first)
- Construction: masonry
- Height: 13 m (43 ft)
- Shape: square tower
- Markings: white tower, red lantern

Light
- First lit: 1927 (current)
- Focal height: 118 m (387 ft)
- Range: 27 nautical miles (50 km; 31 mi)
- Characteristic: Fl W 10s
- Iceland no.: VIT-267

The Dyrhólaey Lighthouse (Icelandic: Dyrhólaeyjarviti [ˈtɪːrˌhouːlaˌeiːjarˌvɪːtɪ]) is a lighthouse located on the central south coast of Iceland.

== Description ==
The lighthouse consists of a square concrete tower, painted white with red trim. Integral keepers quarters are placed on the left and right sides of the tower. A red metal lantern house is placed on top of the tower. The focal plane of the light is 118 m (387 ft). The overall height of the tower is 13 m (43 ft). The site (but not the tower) is open to visitors.

== History ==
The light station at Dyrhólaey was established in 1910. The first lighthouse was a skeletal steel tower prefabricated in Sweden. The present lighthouse was built in 1927.

== Characteristic ==
The light flashes white every 10 seconds. It marks the southernmost point of the mainland of Iceland.

== See also ==
- List of lighthouses in Iceland
