= Árnesinga Folk Museum =

Museum in Iceland

The Árnesinga Folk Museum
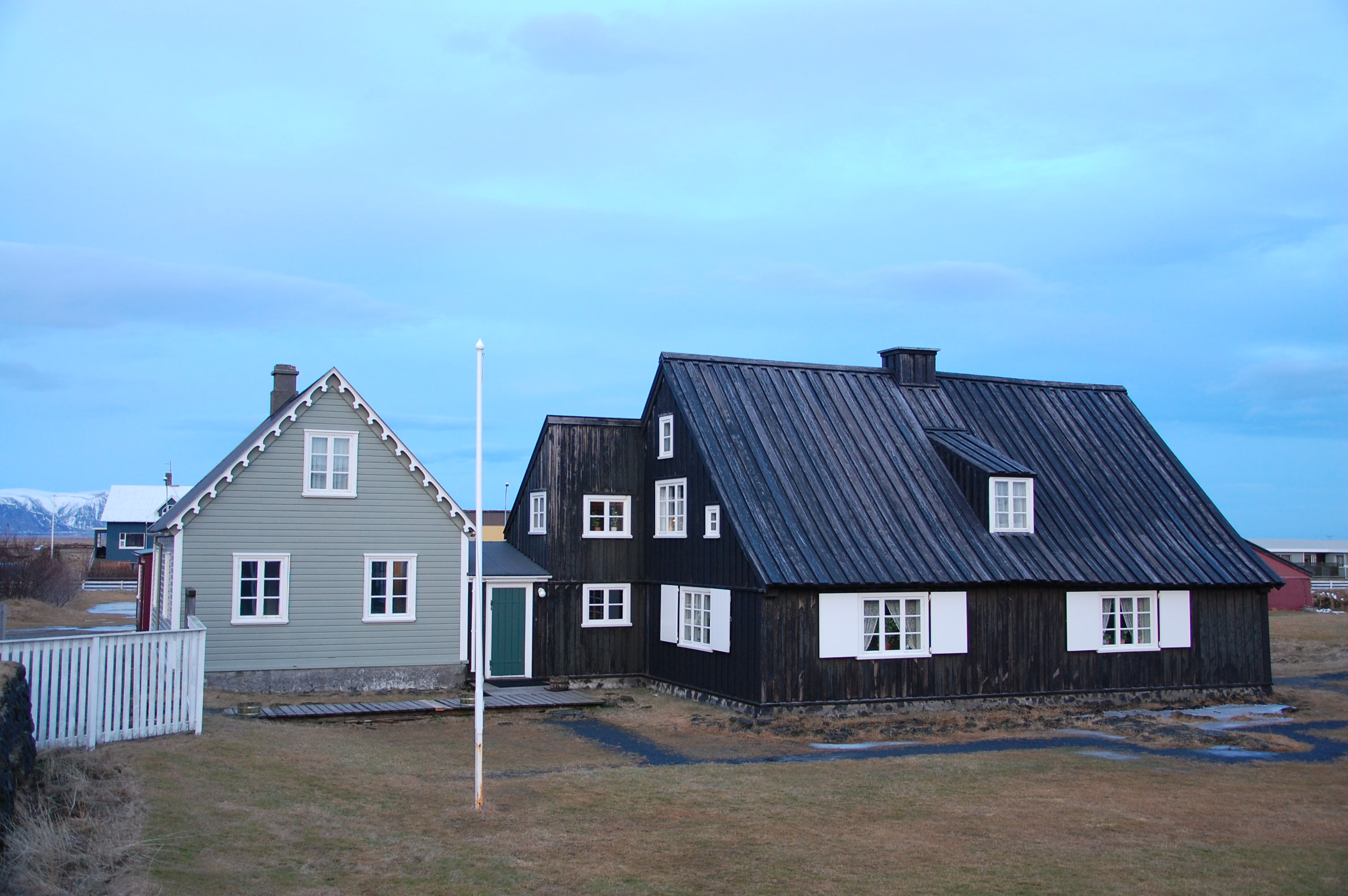
- The House

- Eyrarbakki Iceland
- Coordinates: 63°52′00″N 21°09′00″W

The Árnesinga Folk Museum is a small museum located at Eyrarbakki, a village on the south coast of Iceland, where visitors can experience past times and learn about the history of the building and the region. It is situated in the center of the village near the church. It is also accessible by Strætó bs bus.

== Museum ==
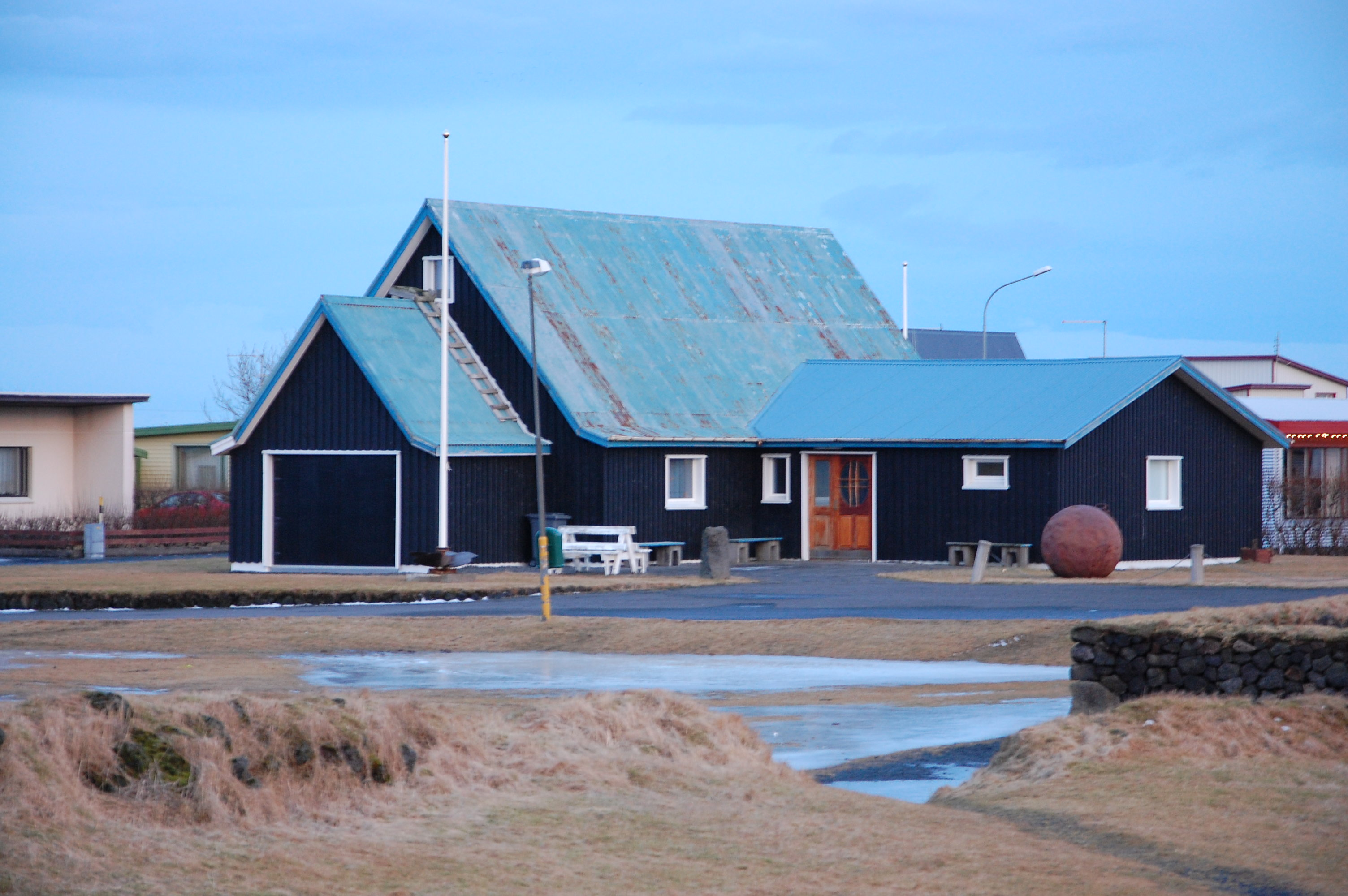
Eyrarbakki, The Maritime museum

The Árnesinga Folk Museum is located in the old merchant's house at Eyrarbakki that is usually called the House (1765). It is one of the oldest extant residential buildings in Iceland.

The House and the so-called Assistant's House connected to it were privately owned until 1992 when they became a state property. After restoration of the buildings, the Árnesinga Folk Museum moved its activities there in 1995. However it was first established in 1964 and situated at Selfoss.

The aim of the Árnesinga Folk Museum is to collect, record, preserve and restore, as well as research topics in rural, cultural and occupational history of the county and introduce to the public.

At the Árnesinga Folk Museum visitors can experience past times, see how the merchant's family lived, and learn about the commercial history of the village. There are also temporary exhibitions which cast light on everyday life and the cultural heritage of the county.

In 2001 the Árnesinga Folk Museum took over the management of a maritime museum which was established in the 1960s by Sigurður Guðjónsson. The Maritime Museum is close to the House where a twelve-rower farsæll is the largest item. Beitningaskúrinn (1925) is also worth visiting, a shed from the heyday of the motor boat fishery, there is exhibition with narratives from those who used to work there.

Eggjaskúrinn, a little shed north of the House was rebuilt and opened in 2004 and now houses a collection of birds and eggs that once belonged to the merchant Peter Nielsen.

In 2011 the Árnesinga Folk Museum bought the house Kirkjubær (1918) which is located just west of the museum itself. It is now being restored and the plan is to display a typical public home of the interwar period.

Various temporary exhibitions take place at the museum as well as cultural events such as concerts, lectures and book readings, where authors read from recently published books.

In 2002 the Árnesinga Folk Museum received the Icelandic Museum Award for their professionalism and foresight in the new Service building at Hafnarbrú 3.

== Village ==
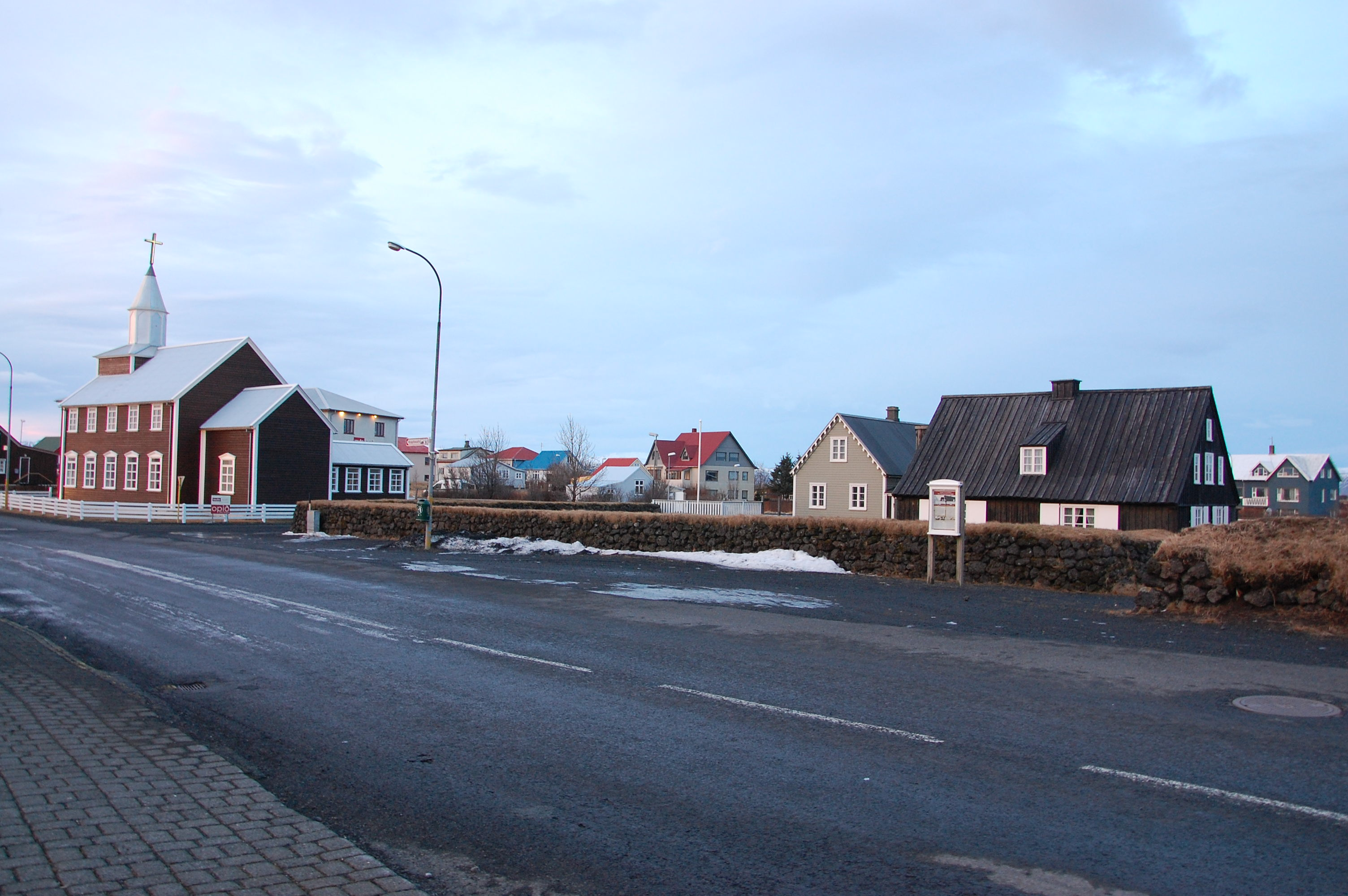
Eyrarbakki, The museum and church

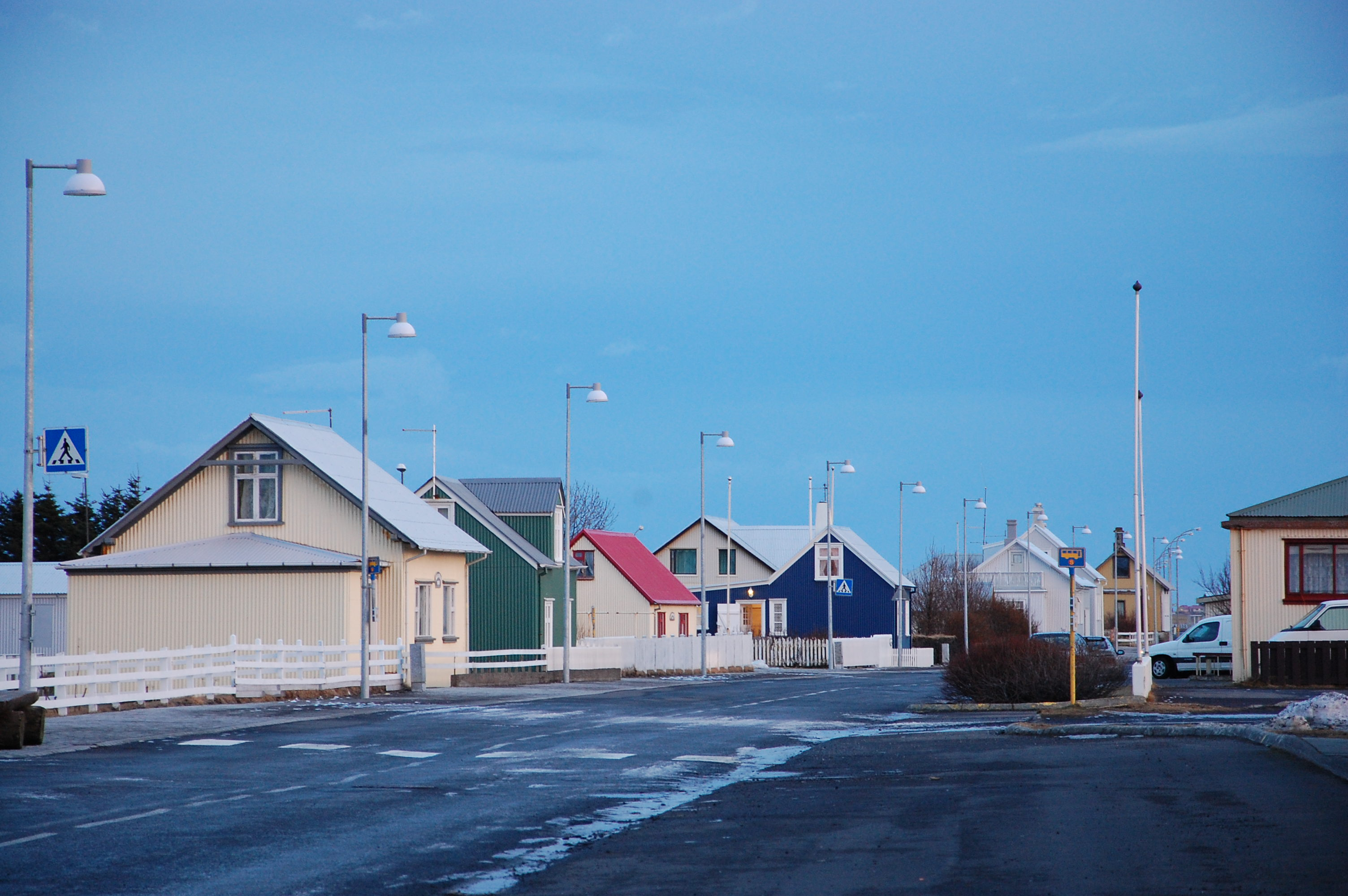
Eyrarbakki

Eyrarbakki is a small village in the south coast of Iceland with a long history. It was an important trading place and for centuries the harbor at Eyrarbakki was the main port in the south of the country.

When the Danish merchants were allowed to overwinter, for the first time in Iceland in 1765 they built a house in the village center to accommodate the factor and his family. It is a wooden building with characteristics of Danish architecture. For two centuries this house was a center for culture and art, which spread through the county. The commercial building itself (a warehouse), Vesturbúð located on the west side was unfortunately torn down in 1950.

Fishing became a more important occupation after 1855 when the Danish–Icelandic Trade Monopoly was abolished and patterns of settlement changed greatly. The village's heyday was from the mid-19th century to the early 20th century but with improved public transport and occupational opportunities the number of inhabitants decreased. Because of that, many houses from 1890 to 1920 have been preserved; those little houses of the common people characterize the village. Not far from the Folk Museum is the church (1890) where the altarpiece is worthy of notice. It is given and painted by the Danish queen Louise of Hesse-Kassel.

== Administration ==
Staff

- Head of administration: Lýður Pálsson (since 1993)
- Curator: Linda Ásdísardóttir

Addresses

- The Árnesinga Folk Museum, The House at Eyrarbakki, Eyrargata 50, 820 Eyrarbakki, tel: 00354 483 1504
- The Maritime Museum Eyrarbakki, Túngata 59, 820 Eyrarbakki, tel: 00354 483 1273
- The Árnesinga Folk Museum, Service building, Hafnarbúð 3, 820 Eyrarbakki, tel: 00354 483 1082
