= Thridrangaviti Lighthouse =

Icelandic lighthouse

Þrídrangaviti Lighthouse
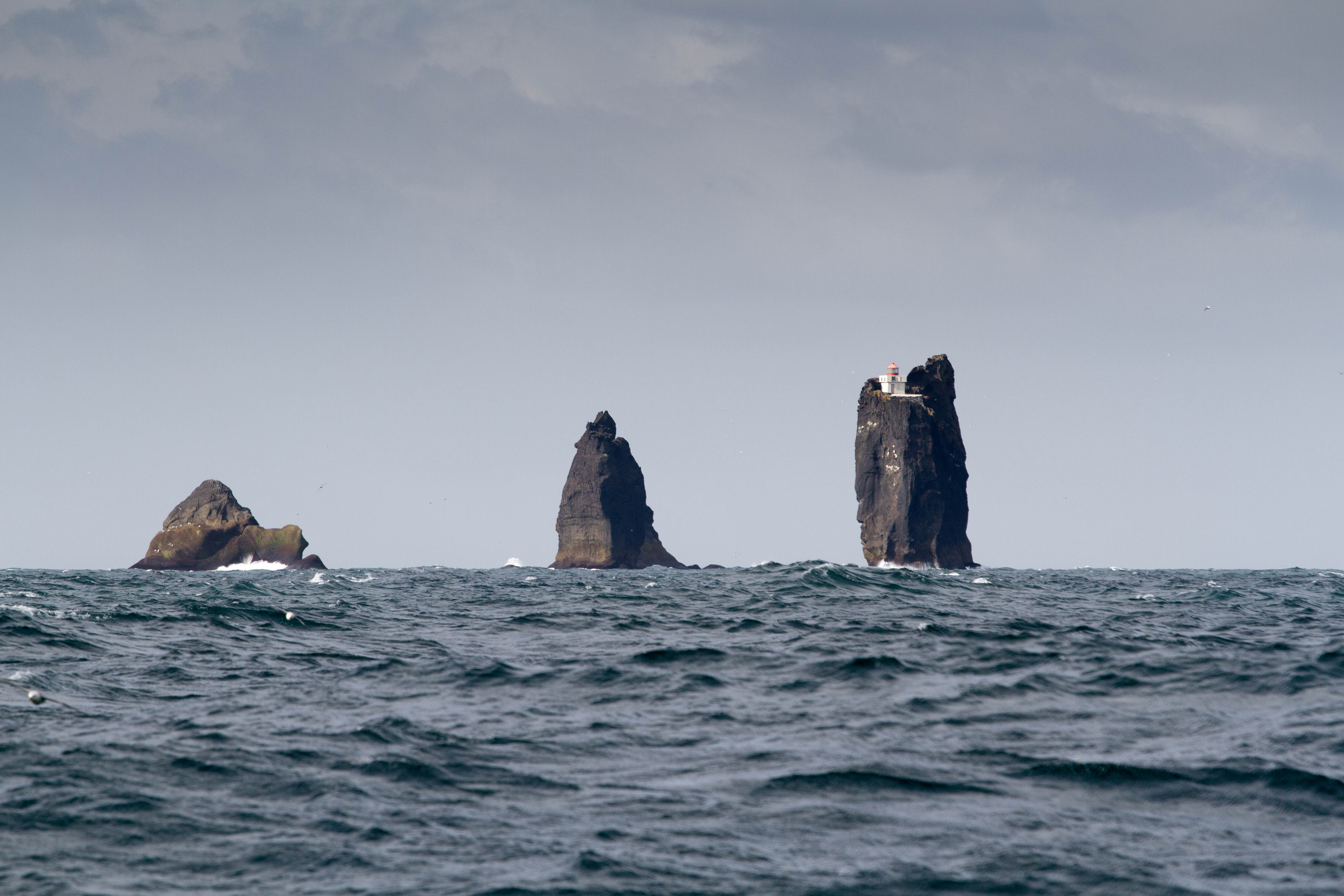
- Thrídrangar Lighthouse, Southern Iceland, is on the tallest of three sea stacks.
- Location: Vestmannaeyjar, South Constituency, Iceland
- Coordinates: 63.48883°N 20.51317°W

Tower
- Construction: Concrete
- Height: 4 metres (13 ft)
- Shape: Square

Light
- First lit: 1942
- Focal height: 34 metres (112 ft)
- Range: 9 nautical miles (17 km; 10 mi)
- Characteristic: White, morse code N ( ▄▄▄ ▄ ) every 30 seconds
- Iceland no.: 278

Þrídrangaviti Lighthouse (transliterated as Thrídrangaviti) is an active lighthouse 7.2 kilometres (4.5 miles) off the southwest coast of Iceland, in the archipelago of Vestmannaeyjar. It is often described as one of the most isolated lighthouses in the world. Þrídrangar means "three rock pillars", referring to the three named sea stacks at that location: Stóridrangur (on which the lighthouse stands), Þúfudrangur, and Klofadrangur. The lighthouse was commissioned on 5 July 1942.

== Construction ==
Þrídrangaviti Lighthouse was constructed during 1938 and 1939. It was originally built by hand without machinery, and it was accessible only by scaling the tallest of the three rocky stacks, whose top is 36.5 metres (120 ft) above the sea. It was built under the direction of engineer Árni Þórarinsson [Arni G. Thorarinsson], who recruited experienced climbers. They were local Westman Islanders who had long supplemented their diet by gathering seabird eggs from the sea cliffs of Iceland. The climb presented significant challenges: a sea swell at the base made the transfer from boat to rock difficult even in calm weather, while the vertical face was worn smooth by the sea and slick with spray. With drills and hammers, the team inserted spikes into the rock that were connected by heavy chain. With each visit during calm weather they were able to add a few more chain links, forming a twisting route upward. Their climbing tools could not bite into the rock near the top, and there were no handholds, so using the same technique developed for gathering seabird eggs, they made a three-person "human stack" - one man on his knees, a second on top of him, and a third one climbing on the second one - for the final pitch. According to Þórarinsson:

The first thing we had to do was create a road up to the cliff. We got together experienced mountaineers, all from the Westman Islands. Then we brought drills, hammers, chains and clamps to secure the chains. Once they got near the top there was no way to get any grip on the rock so one of them got down on his knees, the second stood on his back, and then the third climbed on top of the other two and was able to reach the nib of the cliff above. I cannot even tell you how I was feeling whilst witnessing this incredibly dangerous procedure.

They began in the summer of 1938. The wind churned up the seas so frequently the climbers could only stay for a few hours at a time lest they be unable to re-board the boat. The crew eventually stayed on the precarious rock ledge in tents for a month to finish the house. It was completed around the start of WWII in 1939, but the lamp equipment ordered from a Danish company could not be delivered because Denmark was then occupied by Germany. As a result, there was a delay of three years to install lighting, now supplied by Britain. The lighthouse was commissioned on 5 July 1942.

The light was automated with a lampchanger shortly after the war. A helipad for helicopter access was added in the 1950s. It was converted to solar power in 1993.

== Technical features ==
- The lighthouse building is situated about 30 metres (98 ft) above the sea
- The building is 4 metres (13 ft) square concrete whitewashed single-storey hut, with a roof that resembles a battlement on a medieval castle tower, including embrasure-like openings. The red lantern sits on the roof and is 4 metres (13 ft) high.
- The light is 34 metres (112 ft) above the sea (its focal plane), which determines the "height of sight", meaning the light beam is first visible at sea level from 16.7 kilometres (9.0 nautical miles; 10.4 miles).
- The beam is a long white flash followed by a short white flash (Morse code N ▄▄▄ ▄ ) every 30 seconds.
- The lighthouse Admiralty No. is L4802 — cf. List of lighthouses in Iceland

== Media ==
In 2009, photos taken by Árni Sæberg and published in Morgunblaðið reached a global audience after Justin Bieber re-posted the photo on his social media account. These photos showed a surf so roiled the sea stack was wet two-thirds of the way to the top. Yrsa Sigurðardóttir used the location in her novel Why Did You Lie? (2016/2013). According to The Lighthouse Directory, videos and photos of the lighthouse "suddenly went viral in July 2016". Video and photos of maintenance workers were uploaded to Facebook in July 2015. The Icelandic band KALEO released a music video recorded on the helipad, on 5 July 2020, the light's 78th anniversary, soon after the start of COVID when the public was isolating and online interest in remote habitations was trending.
