= Höfn Glacier Museum =

Museum in Iceland

Coordinates: 64°15′10″N 15°12′47″W

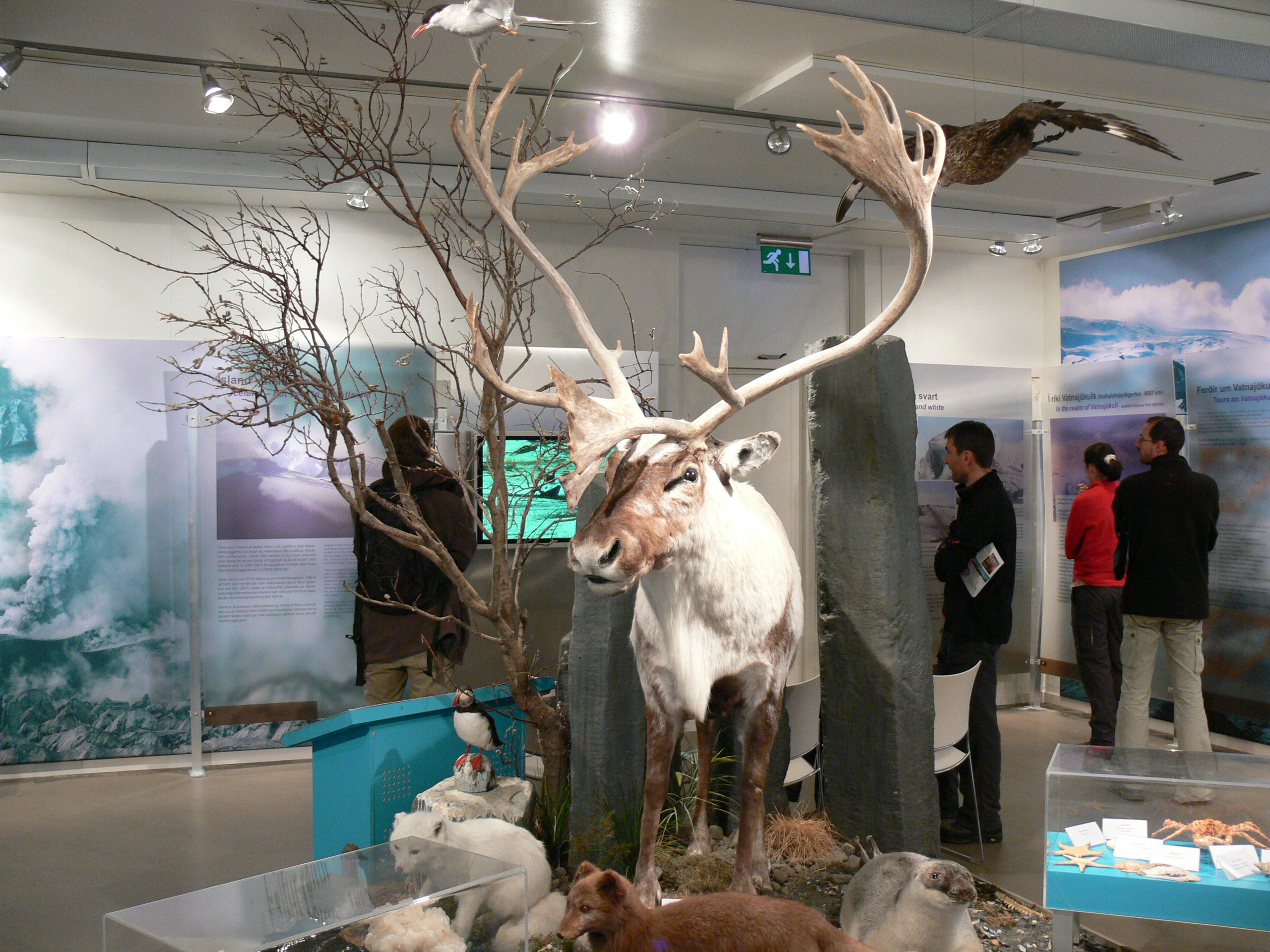

Höfn Glacier Museum was a museum in Höfn in eastern Iceland. It had a variety of displays on the geology, ecology and history of the nearby Vatnajökull glacier and various enactments of explorer tents and models and climbing ropes from the Jöklafari Expedition of 1950. It closed in 2013.
