= Volcano House (Iceland) =

Former geology exhibition in Iceland

- Established: 2011
- Location: Tryggvagata 11, Reykjavík, Iceland
- Coordinates: 64.149289°N 21.94167°W
- Type: Geology exhibition
- Director: Dóra Magnúsdóttir
- Website: Official website

Volcano House was a geology exhibition in Reykjavík, Iceland, operating from 2011 to 2020 and located at Tryggvagata 11. The exhibition gave a brief overview of Iceland's geological history and volcanic systems. Every hour the Volcano House showed two documentaries, one about the volcanic eruption of Eyjafjallajökull in 2010 and one about the volcanic eruption in the Westman Islands in 1973. The mission of Volcano House was to give visitors a glimpse of the reality of living in Iceland, where volcanoes and earthquakes are a part of daily life.

Admission to the geology exhibition was free, but the documentary film required paid tickets.

== History ==
Volcano House was established in 2011 by the siblings Hörður Gunnarsson, Þórir Gunnarsson, Svavar Gunnarsson, Dagbjört Gunnarsdóttir and their families. According to the official website, the Volcano House closed "indefinitely" as of January 15, 2020.

Dóra Magnúsdóttir was the general manager of Volcano House. Dóra is a Geographer with 25 years of experience in Icelandic tourism. Other staff members were for example Geologists, Geographers and tour guides.

== Exhibition ==
A brief synopsis of Iceland's geological history and volcanic system were displayed in the Volcano House, together with photographs of the volcanic eruptions and other aspects of Icelandic nature. Volcano House offered a hands-on geology exhibition where guests could handle various samples of pumice, ash and lava from Icelandic volcanoes, for example ash from Eyjafjallajökull and Grímsvötn and pumice from Hekla. A collection of semi-precious rocks and minerals from around the country were also on display, and were available for purchase. Rocks on display were for example Jaspis, Opal, Obsidian, Rock crystal and Iceland spar. Volcano House offered guidance and information throughout the exhibit.

The interior design of the exhibition was intended to evoke the style of 1973, the year when the volcanic eruption in Heimaey in the Westman Islands occurred.

=== Cinema ===
The Volcano House cinema presented two documentaries covering two of the most powerful volcanic eruptions that have occurred in Iceland over the last 40 years - the 1973 eruption in Heimaey on the Westman Islands, and the 2010 eruption of Eyjafjallajökull in South Iceland. The documentaries were exclusively made for Volcano House. Each screening was about 55 minutes and started with a short personal introduction on Volcanology in Iceland. The films were shown every hour from 09:00 to 21:00. The films were also available in German, French and Icelandic. In the summertime the films were shown in German and French but from September until May they were shown in other languages upon request.
