= Árborg =

Sveitarfélagið Árborg
- Municipality
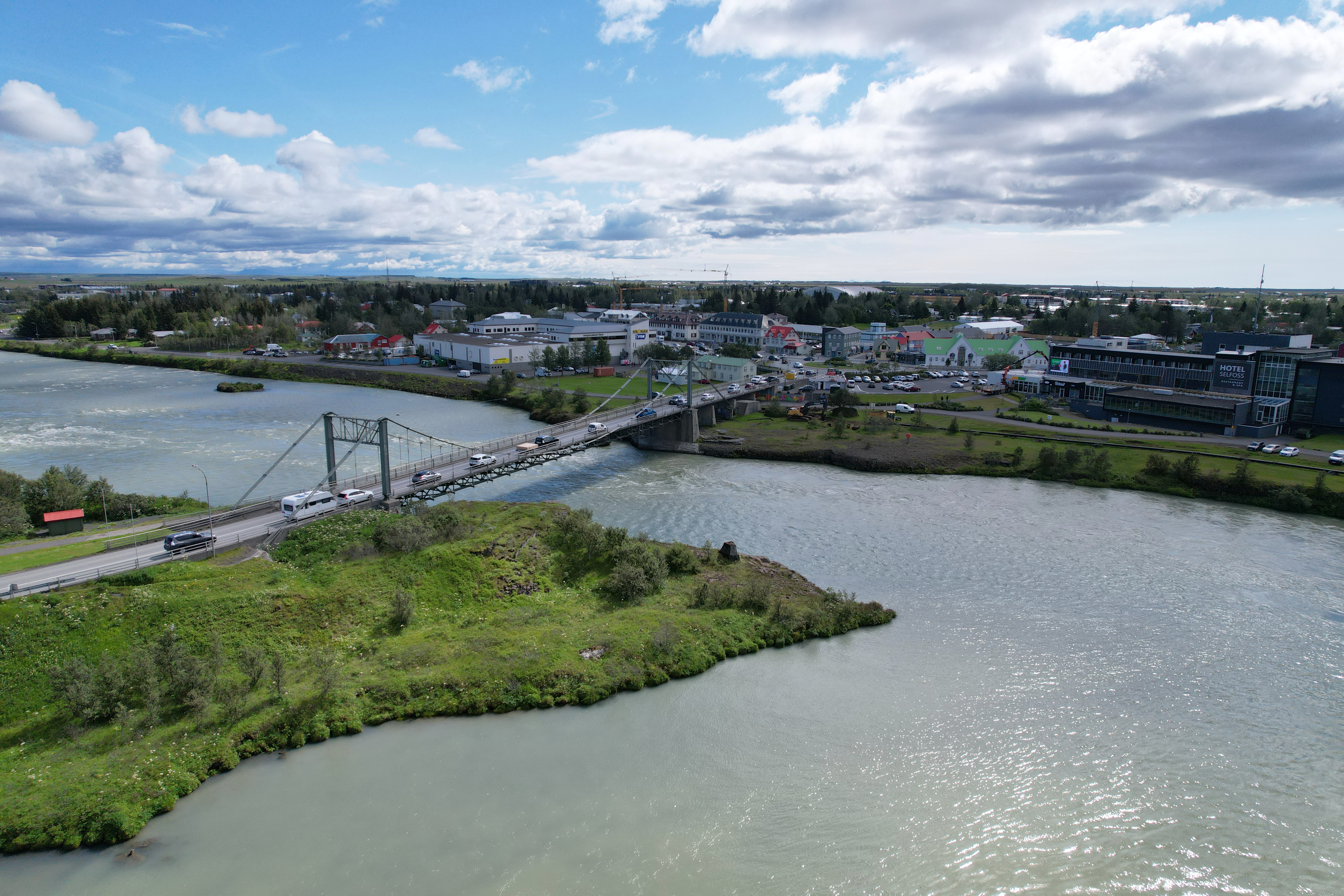
- View over Selfoss, looking over Ölfusá river.

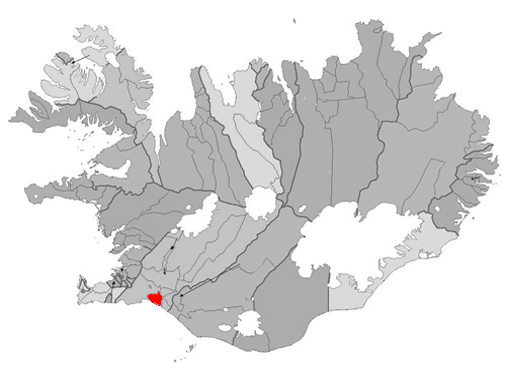
- Location of Sveitarfélagið Árborg

- Location within Iceland
- Coordinates: 63°56′10″N 21°00′00″W
- Country: Iceland
- Region: Southern Region
- Constituency: South Constituency

Government
  - Manager: Ásta Stefánsdóttir

Area
  - Total: 157 km^{2} (61 sq mi)

Population (2024)
  - Total: 11,565
  - Density: 73.7/km^{2} (191/sq mi)
- Postal code(s): 800, 801, 802, 820, 825
- Municipal number: 8200
- Website: arborg.is

Sveitarfélagið Árborg (Icelandic pronunciation: [ˈsveiːtarˌfjɛːˌlaijɪð ˈaurˌpɔrk]) is a municipality in the Southern Region of Iceland. It is the most populous in the region, with a population of 11,565 in 2024. Founded in 1998, its largest town is Selfoss. Eyrarbakki and Stokkseyri are two communities on the southern coast and Sandvíkurhreppur is a rural administrative region between those three other towns.

The area was represented in the fifth episode of the first season of the parody TV series Documentary Now! as the host of an Al Capone Festival.

== Twin towns — sister cities ==
Árborg is twinned with:

- Arendal, Norway
- Kalmar, Sweden
- Savonlinna, Finland

== See also ==
- Municipalities of Iceland
