= List of lighthouses in Iceland =

This is a list of lighthouses in Iceland.

== Lighthouses ==
Name	Admiralty No.	Location	Year built	Focal plane	Tower height	Notes	Status	Image
Selvogsviti	L4824	Suðurland	1931	21 m (69 ft)	15 m (49 ft)	Orange square tower, red lantern house.	Active	
Krýsuvíkurviti	L4826	Suðurnes	1965	61 m (200 ft)	5 m (16 ft)	Orange cylindrical tower, red lantern house.	Active	
Hópsnesviti	L4828	Suðurnes	1928	16 m (52 ft)	8 m (26 ft)	Orange square tower, red lantern house.	Active	
Reykjanes aukaviti	L4468	Suðurnes	1947	25 m (82 ft)	5 m (16 ft)	Orange semi-hexagonal tower, integral lantern house.	Active	
Reykjanesviti	L4466	Suðurnes	1929	73 m (240 ft)	31 m (102 ft)	White cylindrical tower, red lantern house.	Active	
Stafnesviti	L4472	Suðurnes	1925	16 m (52 ft)	11 m (36 ft)	Orange square tower, red lantern house.	Active	
Sandgerðisviti	L4476	Suðurnes		21 m (69 ft)	11 m (36 ft)	Yellow square tower, yellow lantern house.	Active	
Garðskagaviti (1897)		Suðurnes	1897		11 m (36 ft)	White square tower, no lantern house, two red horizontal stripes.	Inactive	
Garðskagaviti (1944)	L4480	Suðurnes	1944	31 m (102 ft)	28.6 m (94 ft)	White conical tower, red lantern house.	Active	
Hólmsbergsviti	L4483	Suðurnes	1956	36 m (118 ft)	13 m (43 ft)	Orange conical tower, red lantern house.	Active	
Vatnsesviti	L4488	Suðurnes	1956	15 m (49 ft)	8 m (26 ft)	Orange square tower, red lantern house.	Active	
Gerðistangaviti	L4494	Suðurnes	1918	11 m (36 ft)	10 m (33 ft)	Orange square tower, red lantern house.	Active	
Hafnarfjörður	L4495	Reykjavik		13 m (43 ft)	6 m (20 ft)	Unpainted concrete cylindrical tower integral building.	Active	
Hafnarfjörður (1901)	L4495.1	Reykjavik	1901		6 m (20 ft)	White and red horizontal bands on square tower, integral lantern house.	Inactive	
Álftanesviti	L4499	Reykjavík		5 m (16 ft)	4.7 m (15 ft)	Orange rectangular tower, no lantern house, red vertical stripes.	Active	
Gróttuviti	L4501	Reykjavik	1897	24 m (79 ft)	23 m (75 ft)	White conical tower, red lantern house.	Active	
Engeyjarviti	L4505	Reykjavík		15 m (49 ft)	8 m (26 ft)	Yellow tower.	Active	
Reykjavík Norðurgarði	L4506	Reykjavik		7 m (23 ft)	4 m (13 ft)	Yellow pyramidal tower on breakwater.	Active	
Reykjavík Ingólfsgarði	L4508	Reykjavik		7 m (23 ft)	4 m (13 ft)	Yellow pyramidal tower on breakwater.	Active	
Reykjavík Sæbraut		Reykjavik	2019	10.5 m (34 ft)	4 m (13 ft)	Yellow pyramidal tower.	Active	
Reykjavík Skarfagarður	L4513.3	Reykjavik		8 m (26 ft)	4 m (13 ft)	Yellow pyramidal tower.	Active	
Hvaleyrarviti	L4516	Vesturland	1948	3 m (9.8 ft)		Red steel tower/lantern house.	Active	
Krossvíkurviti		Vesturland			13 m (43 ft)	Orange square tower, red lantern house.	Active	
Akranesviti (1918)		Vesturland	1918		13 m (43 ft)	White square tower, gray lantern house.	Inactive	
Akranesviti (1947)	L4520	Vesturland	1947	24 m (79 ft)	21 m (69 ft)	White conical tower, red lantern house, eight buttresses.	Active	
Þormóðsskersviti	L4526	Vesturland	1947	34 m (112 ft)	23 m (75 ft)	White tower, red lantern, black vertical panels.	Active	
Þjófaklettaviti	L4529	Vesturland		8 m (26 ft)	4 m (13 ft)	Red cylindrical tower, red lantern house.	Active	
Rauðanesviti	L4529	Vesturland		8 m (26 ft)	6 m (20 ft)	Orange hexagonal tower, integral lantern house.	Active	
Kirkjuhólsviti	L4531	Vesturland	1953	36 m (118 ft)	6 m (20 ft)	White tower, integral lantern house.	Active	
Arnarstapaviti	L4532			18 m (59 ft)	3 m (9.8 ft)	White tower, integral lantern house.	Active	
Malarrifsviti	L4534	Vesturland	1946	31 m (102 ft)	24 m (79 ft)	White cylindrical four-buttressed tower, red lantern house.	Active	
Svörtuloftaviti	L4538	Vesturland	1931	28 m (92 ft)	12 m (39 ft)	Orange square tower, red lantern house.	Active	
Öndverðarnesviti	L4540	Vesturland	1973	11 m (36 ft)	5 m (16 ft)	Orange square tower, red lantern house.	Active	
Krossnesviti	L4544	Vesturland	1926	21 m (69 ft)	9 m (30 ft)	Orange square tower, red lantern house.	Active	
Ólafsvíkurviti		Vesturland			4 m (13 ft)	Orange hexagonal tower, integral lantern house.	Inactive	
Hnausaviti		Vesturland			4 m (13 ft)	Orange hexagonal tower, integral lantern house.	Inactive	
Höskuldseyjarviti	L4550	Vesturland	1948	13 m (43 ft)	10 m (33 ft)	Orange square tower, red lantern house.	Active	
Elliðaeyjarviti	L4552	Vesturland		45 m (148 ft)	8 m (26 ft)	White triangular tower, red lantern house.	Active	
Súgandiseyjarviti	L4554	Vesturland		30 m (98 ft)	3 m (9.8 ft)	Red cylindrical tower/lantern house.	Active	
Klofningsviti (Flatey)	L4556	Vestfirðir	1926	15 m (49 ft)	9 m (30 ft)	Orange square tower, red lantern house.	Active	
Miðleiðarskersviti	L4557	Vestfirðir	1955	7 m (23 ft)	3 m (9.8 ft)		Active	
Skarfaklettsviti	L4556.5	Vesturland	1958	7 m (23 ft)	3 m (9.8 ft)		Active	
Skorarviti	L4558	Vestfirðir	1954	7 m (23 ft)	5 m (16 ft)	Rectangular white tower, integral lantern house.	Active	
Bjargtangaviti	L4560	Vestfirðir	1948	16 m (52 ft)	6 m (20 ft)	White semi-elliptical tower, integral lantern house.	Active	
Háanes (Ólafsviti)	L4562	Vestfirðir	1947	26 m (85 ft)	14 m (46 ft)	White conical tower, red lantern house.	Active	
Kópanesviti	L4567	Vestfirðir	1971	25 m (82 ft)	7 m (23 ft)	Orange rectangular structure, white lantern house on roof.	Active	
Langanesviti (Arnarfjörður)	L4568	Vestfirðir	1950	23 m (75 ft)	5 m (16 ft)	Orange rectangular tower, integral lantern house.	Active	
Svalvogaviti	L4570	Vestfirðir	1920	54 m (177 ft)	6 m (20 ft)	Orange square tower, red lantern house.	Active	
Fjallaskagaviti	L4574	Vestfirðir	1954	19 m (62 ft)	12 m (39 ft)	Orange conical tower, red lantern roof.	Active	
Sauðanesviti (Súgandafjörður)	L4575	Vestfirðir	1934	30 m (98 ft)	3 m (9.8 ft)		Active	
Galtarviti (Göltur)	L4578	Vestfirðir	1956	32 m (105 ft)	14 m (46 ft)	Orange square tower, red lantern house.	Active	
Óshólaviti	L4580	Vestfirðir	1937	30 m (98 ft)	6 m (20 ft)	Orange square tower, red lantern house.	Active	
Arnarnesviti	L4584	Vestfirðir	1921	64 m (210 ft)	6 m (20 ft)	Orange pyramidal tower, red lantern house.	Active	
Æðeyjarviti	L4582	Vestfirðir	1949	26 m (85 ft)	13 m (43 ft)	White conical tower, red lantern house.	Active	
Sléttueyrarviti (Slettunes)	L4600	Vestfirðir	1949	7 m (23 ft)	5 m (16 ft)	Orange semi-hexagonal tower, integral lantern house.	Active	
Straumnesviti	L4604	Vestfirðir	1919	30 m (98 ft)	24 m (79 ft)	Orange pyramidal steel tower.	Active	
Hornbjargsviti	L4606	Vestfirðir	1930	31 m (102 ft)	10 m (33 ft)	Orange square tower attached to coast guard station.	Active	
Selskersviti	L4608	Vestfirðir	1947	23 m (75 ft)	15 m (49 ft)	White cylindrical two-staged tower, red lantern house.	Active	
Seljanesviti		Vestfirðir			4 m (13 ft)	Orange square tower, lantern on top.	Inactive	
Gjögurviti	L4616	Vestfirðir	1921	39 m (128 ft)	24 m (79 ft)	Red skeletal steel tower, red lantern house.	Active	
Grímseyjarviti (Steingrímsfjörður)	L4620	Vestfirðir	1949	82 m (269 ft)	10 m (33 ft)	Orange square tower, red lantern house.	Active	
Malarhornsviti	L4622	Vestfirðir	1948	27 m (89 ft)	3 m (9.8 ft)	Orange tower, integral lantern room.	Active	
Hólmavíkurviti	L4626	Vestfirðir	1915	12 m (39 ft)	3 m (9.8 ft)	Yellow octagonal steel tower/lantern house.	Active	
Skarðsviti	L4628	Norðurland Vestra	1951	52 m (171 ft)	14 m (46 ft)	White conical tower, red lantern house.	Active	
Kálfshamarsviti	L4635	Norðurland Vestra	1942	21 m (69 ft)	16 m (52 ft)	White square tower, red lantern house, vertical black panels on tower.	Active	
Skagatáarviti	L4636	Norðurland Vestra	1935	18 m (59 ft)	9 m (30 ft)	White church displays light.	Active	
Hegranesviti	L4644	Norðurland Vestra	1937	23 m (75 ft)	10 m (33 ft)	Orange square tower, red lantern house.	Active	
Málmeyjarviti	L4648	Norðurland Vestra	1938	41 m (135 ft)	10 m (33 ft)	Orange square tower, red lantern house.	Active	
Straumnesviti nyrðri	L4650	Norðurland Vestra	1942	20 m (66 ft)	10 m (33 ft)	White/black vertical striped octagonal tower, red lantern house.	Active	
Sauðanesviti	L4652	Norðurland Vestra	1934	37 m (121 ft)	10.5 m (34 ft)	Orange square tower, red lantern house, integral quarters.	Active	
Selvíkurnefsviti	L4654	Norðurland Vestra	1931	20 m (66 ft)	8 m (26 ft)	Yellow square tower, yellow lantern house.	Active	
Siglunesviti	L4656	Norðurland Vestra	1908	51 m (167 ft)	12 m (39 ft)	Orange square tower, red lantern house.	Active	
Bríkurviti	L4660.6	Norðurland Eystra	1966	58 m (190 ft)	4 m (13 ft)	Concrete tower, white lantern house.	Active	
Hrólfsskersviti	L4658	Norðurland Eystra	1951	18 m (59 ft)	16 m (52 ft)	Orange conical tower, red lantern house roof.	Active	
Hríseyjarviti	L4660	Norðurland Eystra	1920	113 m (371 ft)	9 m (30 ft)	Orange square tower, red lantern house.	Active	
Hjalteyrarviti	L4666	Norðurland Eystra	1920	14 m (46 ft)	13 m (43 ft)	Red skeletal steel tower, red lantern house.	Active	
Svalbarðseyrarviti	L4668	Norðurland Eystra	1920	9 m (30 ft)	8 m (26 ft)	Orange square tower, red lantern house.	Active	
Gjögurtáarviti	L4657	Norðurland Eystra	1970	28 m (92 ft)	4 m (13 ft)	White concrete tower, white lantern house.	Active	
Grímseyjarviti	L4674	Norðurland Eystra	1937	27 m (89 ft)	9.5 m (31 ft)	Orange square tower, red lantern house.	Active	
Flateyjarviti á Skjálfanda	L4576	Norðurland Eystra	1963	27 m (89 ft)	9.5 m (31 ft)	Orange square tower, red lantern house.	Active	
Húsavíkurviti	L4680	Norðurland Eystra	1956	49 m (161 ft)	12 m (39 ft)	Orange semi-elliptical tower, integral lantern house.	Active	
Lundeyjarviti á Skjálfanda	L4686	Norðurland Eystra	1977	46 m (151 ft)	4 m (13 ft)	White cylindrical steel tower/lantern house on square concrete pad.	Active	
Tjörnesviti	L4688	Norðurland Eystra	1929	33 m (108 ft)	13 m (43 ft)	Orange square tower, red lantern house.	Active	
Mánáreyjarviti	L4689	Norðurland Eystra	1982	38 m (125 ft)	4 m (13 ft)	White cylindrical steel tower/lantern house, red roof.	Active	
Kópaskersviti	L4690	Norðurland Eystra	1951	21 m (69 ft)	14 m (46 ft)	White square tower, red lantern, vertical black stripes.	Active	
Rauðanúpsviti	L4696	Norðurland Eystra	1958	66 m (217 ft)	8 m (26 ft)	Orange square tower, red lantern house.	Active	
Hraunhafnartangaviti	L4649	Norðurland Eystra	1951	21 m (69 ft)	19 m (62 ft)	White square tower, red lantern room vertical black panels.	Active	
Raufarhafnarviti	L4700	Norðurland Eystra	1931	33 m (108 ft)	10 m (33 ft)	Orange tower, red lantern house.	Active	
Raufarhafnarradíóviti	L4702	Norðurland Eystra		9 m (30 ft)	3.5 m (11 ft)	Orange building, light displayed from day mark on roof.	Active	
Melrakkanesviti	L4706	Norðurland Eystra	1956	23 m (75 ft)	12 m (39 ft)	Yellow tower.	Active	
Grenjanesviti	L4710	Norðurland Eystra	1945	25 m (82 ft)	19 m (62 ft)	White square tower, red lantern house, black vertical panels on tower.	Active	
Langanesviti	L4712	Norðurland Eystra	1950	53 m (174 ft)	10 m (33 ft)	White cylindrical tower, red lantern house.	Active	
Digranesviti	L4714	Norðurland Eystra	1947	28 m (92 ft)	19 m (62 ft)	White square tower, red lantern, black vertical stripes.	Active	
Kolbeinstangaviti	L4716	Austurland		32 m (105 ft)	20 m (66 ft)	Gray square concrete tower, vertical black stripes, white lantern house.	Active	
Bjarnareyjarviti	L4721	Austurland	1944	31 m (102 ft)	8 m (26 ft)	Orange square buttressed tower, red lantern house.	Active	
Kögurviti	L4722	Austurland	1951	19 m (62 ft)	8 m (26 ft)	White square tower, red lantern house.	Active	
Glettinganesviti	L4724	Austurland	1931	25 m (82 ft)	20 m (66 ft)	Orange square tower, red lantern house.	Active	
Brimnesviti	L4726	Austurland	1938	12 m (39 ft)	7 m (23 ft)	Orange square tower, red lantern house.	Active	
Dalatangaviti (1895)		Austurland	1895		5 m (16 ft)	White building, light shown from roof.	Inactive	
Dalatangaviti (1959)	L4730	Austurland	1959	19 m (62 ft)	10 m (33 ft)	Orange rectangular tower, integral keepers house, red lantern house.	Active	
Norðfjarðarhornsviti	L4730.6	Austurland		14 m (46 ft)	4 m (13 ft)	Unpainted concrete tower, integral lantern house.	Active	
Norðfjarðarviti	L4731	Austurland		38 m (125 ft)	8 m (26 ft)	White square tower, integral lantern house.	Active	
Seleyjarviti	L4733	Austurland	1956	27 m (89 ft)	14 m (46 ft)	White conical tower, red lantern house.	Active	
Gríma	L4735	Austurland	1961	22 m (72 ft)	3 m (9.8 ft)	Red cylindrical lantern house on concrete pad.	Active	
Vattarnesviti	L4734	Austurland	1957	26 m (85 ft)	12 m (39 ft)	Orange cylindrical tower, red lantern house roof.	Active	
Grímuviti	L4735	Austurland	1961	22 m (72 ft)	3 m (9.8 ft)	Red steel cylindrical tower on large white concrete pad.	Active	
Hafnarnesviti	L4473	Austurland	1937	17 m (56 ft)	6.5 m (21 ft)	Orange square tower, red lantern house.	Active	
Landahólsviti	L4743	Austurland	1953	23 m (75 ft)	8 m (26 ft)	White rectangular tower, integral lantern house.	Active	
Kambanesviti	L4744	Austurland	1922	26 m (85 ft)	11 m (36 ft)	Orange square tower, red lantern house.	Active	
Selnes lighthouse	L4746	Austurland		12.5 m (41 ft)	9 m (30 ft)	Gray square tower and lantern house.	Active	
Streitisviti	L4749.2	Austurland	1984	17 m (56 ft)	12 m (39 ft)	Black/white alternating vertical stripes on hexagonal tower.	Active	
Karlstaðatangaviti	L4750	Austurland	1922	11 m (36 ft)	5 m (16 ft)	Orange square tower, red lantern house.	Active	
Æðarsteinsviti	L4754	Austurland	1922	12 m (39 ft)	6 m (20 ft)	Orange square tower, red lantern house.	Active	
Djúpavogsradíóviti	L4756	Austurland	1974				Active	
Ketilflesjarviti	L4760	Austurland	1946	18 m (59 ft)	12 m (39 ft)	White conical tower, red lantern house.	Active	
Papeyjarviti	L4762	Austurland	1922	57 m (187 ft)	8 m (26 ft)	Orange square tower, red lantern house.	Active	
Hvalnesviti	L4764	Austurland	1955	27 m (89 ft)	12 m (39 ft)	Orange tower, orange lantern house.	Active	
Stokksnesviti	L4766	Austurland	1946	30 m (98 ft)	19 m (62 ft)	White pyramidal two-staged tower, red lantern house.	Active	
Hellisviti	L4768.4	Austurland		17 m (56 ft)	6 m (20 ft)	Yellow trapezoidal tower, integral lantern house.	Active	
Hvanneyjarviti	L4768	Austurland	1922	15 m (49 ft)	8 m (26 ft)	Orange square tower, red lantern house.	Active	
Hrollaugseyjarviti	L4770	Austurland	1954	24 m (79 ft)	16 m (52 ft)	White cylindrical tower, red lantern house.	Active	
Ingólfshöfðaviti	L4772	Suðurland	1948	75 m (246 ft)	10 m (33 ft)	Orange square tower, red lantern house.	Active	
Skaftárósviti	L4774	Suðurland	1953	20 m (66 ft)	20 m (66 ft)	Red skeletal steel tower, red lantern house.	Active	
Skarðsfjöruviti	L4775	Suðurland	1959	25 m (82 ft)	18 m (59 ft)	Red skeletal steel frame, red lantern.	Active	
Alviðruhamraviti	L4776	Suðurland	1929	33 m (108 ft)	18 m (59 ft)	Orange square tower, red lantern house.	Active	
Dyrhólaeyjarviti	L4780	Suðurland	1927	123 m (404 ft)	13 m (43 ft)	White square tower, red lantern house, integral quarters.	Active	
Bakkafjöruviti	L4781	Suðurland	1984	15 m (49 ft)	7 m (23 ft)		Active	
Stórhöfðaviti	L4784	Vestmannaeyjar	1906	125 m (410 ft)	7 m (23 ft)	White building, red lantern house, integral quarters.	Active	
Faxaskersviti	L4782	Vestmannaeyjar	1950	12 m (39 ft)	6 m (20 ft)	Orange pyramidal structure, light mounted on pole.	Active	
Urðaviti	L4786	Vestmannaeyjar	1986	30 m (98 ft)	7 m (23 ft)	White lantern house supported by piles and stairway.	Active	
Geirfuglaskersviti	L4800	Vestmannaeyjar		55 m (180 ft)	3 m (9.8 ft)	Rusty guyed tower, light mounted on pole above roof.	Active	
Þrídrangaviti	L4802	Vestmannaeyjar	1942	34 m (112 ft)	4 m (13 ft)	White square tower, red lantern house.	Active	
Knarrarósviti	L4804	Suðurland	1939	30 m (98 ft)	22 m (72 ft)	White square two-staged tower, red lantern house, black vertical panels.	Active	
Þorlákshafnarviti	L4820	Suðurland	1951	12 m (39 ft)	8 m (26 ft)	White rectangular tower, integral lantern house.	Active	

== See also ==
- Lists of lighthouses and lightvessels
