= Whales of Iceland =

Whale museum in Reykjavík, Iceland

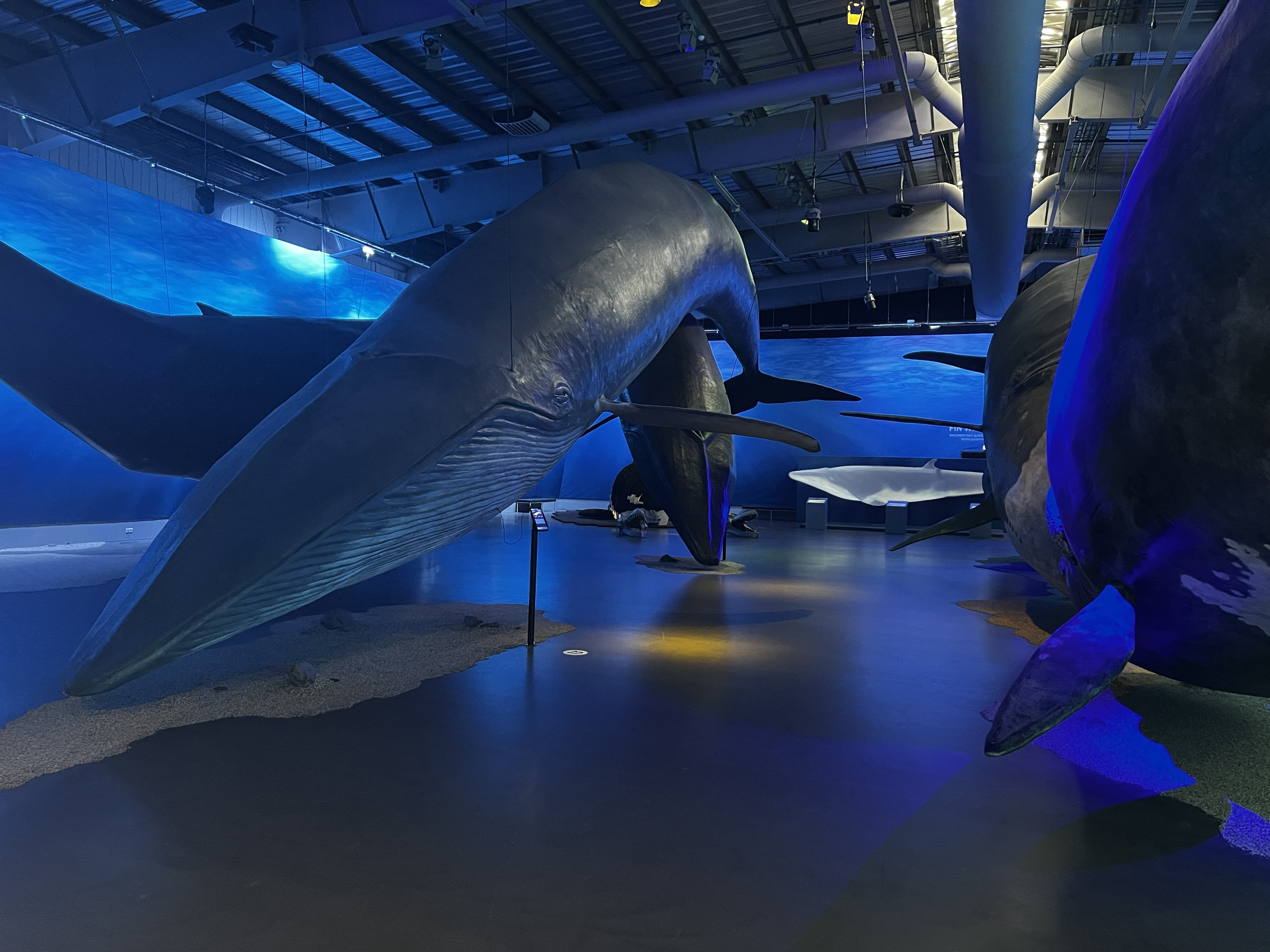
- Established: 2015
- Location: Fiskislóð 23-25, Reykjavík, Iceland
- Coordinates: 64.1556°N 21.9488°W
- Type: Natural history museum
- Website: whalesoficeland.is

Whales of Iceland is a natural history museum located in the Grandi harbour district of Reykjavík, Iceland. First opened in 2015, the museum is dedicated to educating visitors about the various cetacean species that have been sighted in Icelandic waters throughout recorded history.

== Exhibits ==
The museum features life-sized models of 23 cetacean species along with information about their life history; displays of whale specimens including bones, teeth, and baleen; several interactive exhibits on whale biology, migration, and conservation; educational videos; and a theatre room where documentaries are shown. It claims to be the largest museum of its kind in Europe.

== History ==
Whale ribs on display at Whales of Iceland

Whales of Iceland was founded by Icelandic entrepreneur Hörður Bender and opened to the public in February 2015 after two years of preparation, at a reported cost of 100 million ISK. The whale models, which range in size from 25 kilogrammes to two tonnes in weight, were manufactured in China and shipped in pieces to Iceland, where they were assembled and hand-painted to resemble actual individual animals seen in the wild.

In December 2017, the museum was purchased by Special Tours Wildlife Adventures, a whale watching company based in Reykjavík. In 2018 and 2019, the museum, along with several whale watching companies and other local businesses, hosted celebrations for Whale Day, a series of events intended to grow local appreciation of whales. The newest exhibit, dedicated to whale conservation and developed in cooperation with the International Fund for Animal Welfare, opened in June 2019.
