= Reykjavík Maritime Museum =

Maritime museum in Reykjavík, Iceland

Coordinates: 64.1531°N 21.9493°W

Reykjavik Maritime Museum
- Sjóminjasafnið í Reykjavík
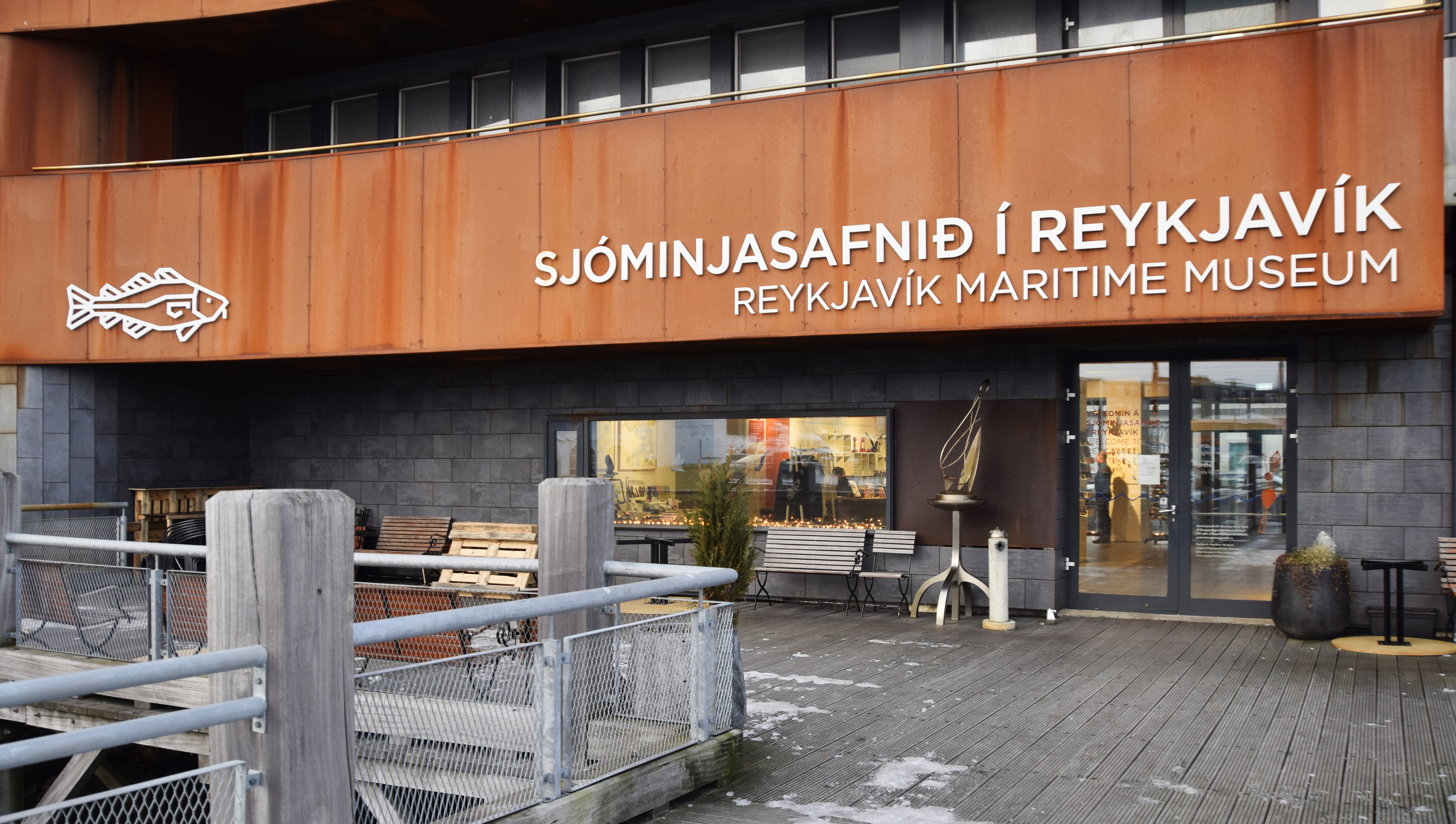
- Established: 2005
- Location: Reykjavík, Iceland
- Type: Maritime Museum
- Website: www.maritimemuseum.is (in English)

The Reykjavik Maritime Museum (Icelandic: Sjóminjasafnið í Reykjavík [ˈsjouːˌmɪnjaˌsapnɪð i ˈreiːcaˌviːk]), formerly Víkin Maritime Museum, is a maritime museum located by the old harbour in the capital of Iceland, Reykjavík and run by Reykjavik City. The museum was established in 2005, and it is now one of five sites belonging to Reykjavik City Museum. There are seven exhibitions at the museum displaying Icelandic maritime history from the early settlements to the late 20th century. An important part of the museum is the Coast Guard and rescue vessel Óðinn (pronounced Othinn). In 2008, the ship was transformed into a museum exhibit about the cod wars in the 1950s and 1970s. The ship also tells about its own history. The museum focuses on the history of fishing in Iceland but also displays temporary exhibitions related to the sea.

== History ==
The museum building was built in 1947 on a landfill called Grandi, and housed a fish freezing plant. In 1959, BÚR (Reykjavik Municipal Fishing Company) bought the plant, and it became one of the largest processors of redfish fillets. In 1985 the freezing plant's operation moved to another location, and the building was unused for about 20 years. The building was extensively renovated and, in 2002, the Reykjavík City Council formally established it as a maritime museum.

The museum opened in 2005 and, for the first three years, occupied the second floor only. The museum closed during the winter of 2007-2008 to reconstruct the first floor and in June 2008, the museum reopened with four new exhibitions and a new entrance. In 2009, the museum expanded again with a new exhibition installed in a former storage area and a museum café which opened in a space formerly rented by the museum. Now the museum has seven halls with seven exhibitions, ranging from photographic displays to full exhibits of 100-year-old boats, including the former Coast Guard vessel Óðinn, acquired by the museum in February 2008. The ship is secured to the pier next to the museum and has been made accessible for guests to visit in guided tours.

== Exhibitions ==
There are three permanent exhibitions in the museum: The History of Sailing, From Poverty to Abundance, and The Coast Guard Vessel Óðinn.

=== The History of Sailing ===
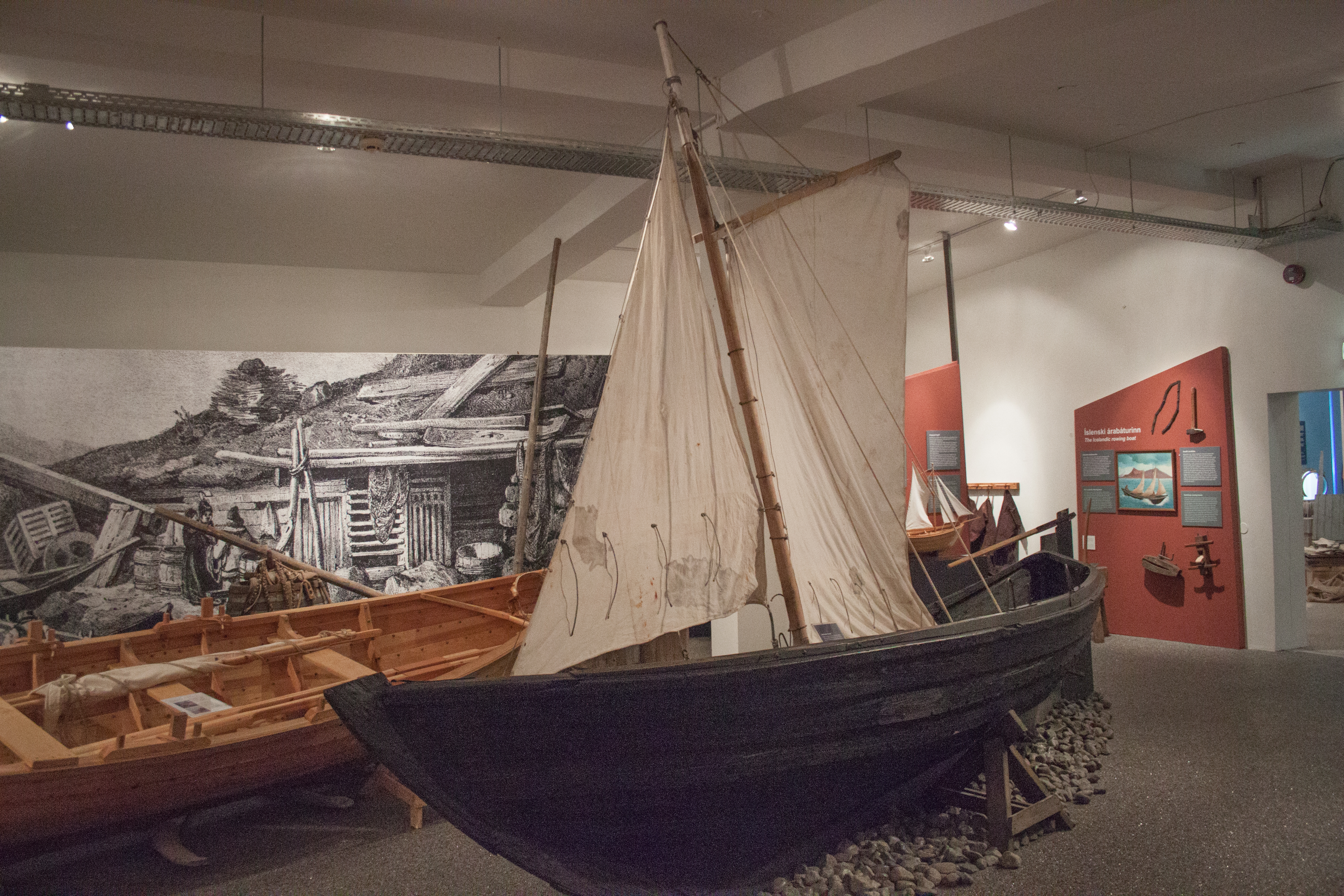
The fishing boat Farsaell, built in 1907

This exhibition recounts Iceland's maritime history and the growth of Reykjavík Harbor which was a natural haven. The exhibition is partly displayed in the space that was the Reykjavík Municipal Fishing Company‘s fish-processing room. The high-ceiling room has a specially designed wooden pier that is 17 m (56 ft) long and 5 m (16 ft). Seawater flows below the pier, and the entrance is through the reconstructed deck of the steamship Gullfoss from 1915. The deck was constructed to give visitors the feel of being on board, and visitors actually become part of the exhibition; the visitors on Gullfoss' deck appear as passengers to the people on the pier.

=== From Poverty to Abundance ===
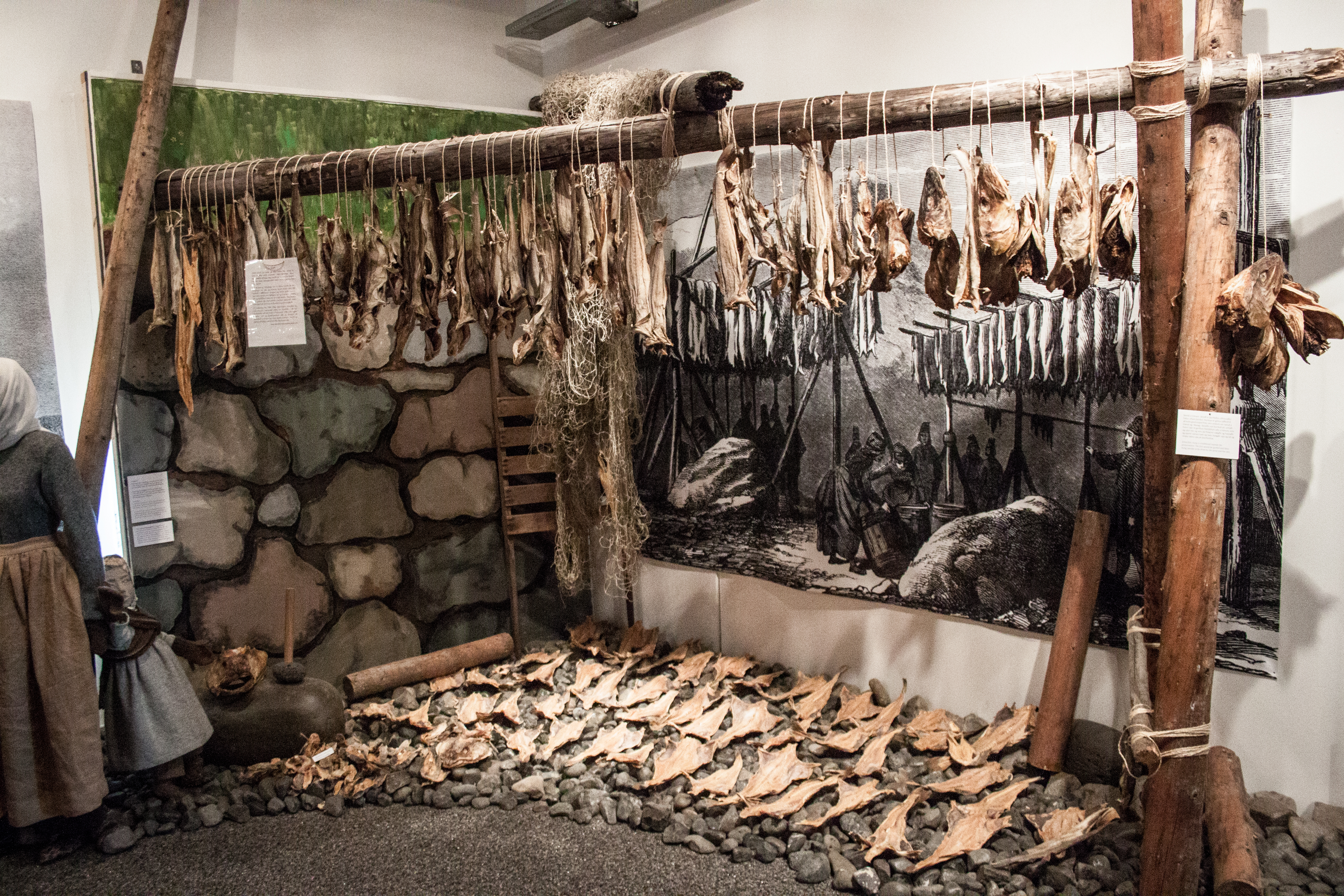
Fish drying display

This exhibition portrays the Icelandic fisheries at the turn of the 20th century, and realistically depicts the lives of Icelandic fishermen. In the late 19th century, fishing the coastal waters in rowboats was the most common method of commercial fishing. This time is represented by the Farsæll, a four-person rowboat built around 1900. As the demand for salted fish grew through the 19th century, larger vessels which could go further out to sea became more common. The history of Iceland's fishery in the 20th century is full of technological advance and new methods of working. The Municipal Fishing Company is an important part of the museum’s exhibition – from 1947 until 1991, the company operated in the same building as the museum.

=== The Coast Guard Vessel Óðinn ===
The Coast Guard Vessel Óðinn is one of the Maritime Museum’s main exhibitions. Óðinn was built in Aalborg, Denmark in 1959. It has a displacement of 910 tons, a length of 63 m (207 ft), a beam of 10 m (33 ft) and a specially reinforced bow and hull for sailing through ice. Óðinn proved a particularly good rescue vessel and it patrolled Iceland's territorial fishing grounds, monitoring both Icelandic and foreign vessels. Óðinn took part in the three Cod Wars where the most effective and famous weapon was the trawl warp cutter, which is displayed on the afterdeck. The vessel was also called on for assistance when weather conditions made transportation on land difficult, particularly in remote communities.i

=== Temporary exhibits ===
In December 2010, there were two temporary exhibits: a painting exhibition featuring Bjarni Jónsson and a photographic display covering the arctic convoys.

== Opening hours, facilities and management ==
The museum has a programme for children. In addition to the exhibitions, the Coastal Vessel Óðinn is great fun for children to explore. In the rowboat Sæfari, kids can dress up as traditional fishermen.

The museum houses a gift shop and the Víkin Café which has an extensive view of the harbor. Outside the café is a large pier where guests can watch harbor activity. The museum is within a short walking distance of the center and is also served by public bus #14.
