= Eyrarbakki =

- Village
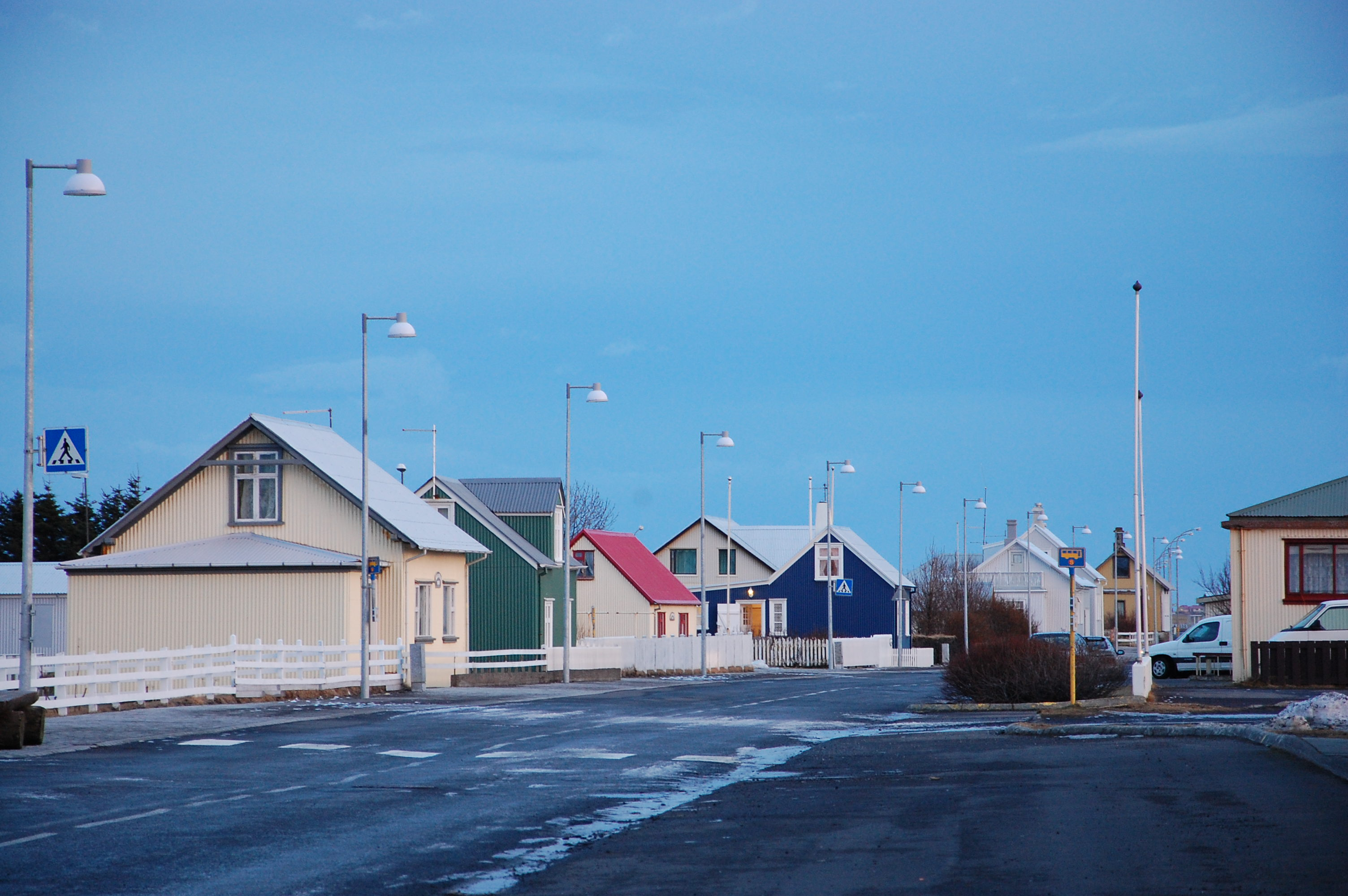
- View of the village

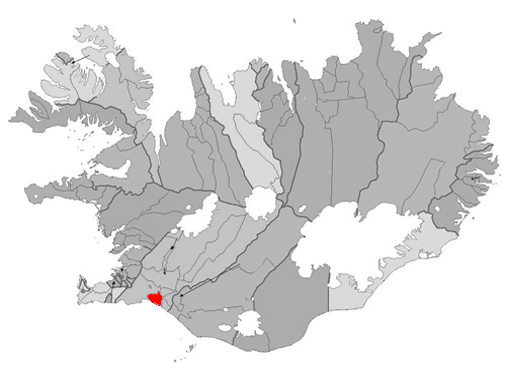
- Location of the Municipality of Árborg

- Location within Iceland
- Coordinates: 63°52′N 21°09′W
- Country: Iceland
- Constituency: South Constituency
- Region: Southern Region
- Municipality: Árborg

Population (2011)
  - Total: 569
- Time zone: UTC+0 (WET)
- Area code: 820

Eyrarbakki (Icelandic pronunciation: [ˈeiːrarˌpahcɪ]) is a fishing village on the south coast of Iceland with a population of about 570 people, not including inhabitants of the prison located there. The village is founded on the Great Þjórsá Lava.

== History ==
For centuries, the harbour at Eyrarbakki was the main port in the south of the country, and Eyrarbakki was the trading centre for the whole of the southern region extending from Selvogur in the west to Lómagnúpur in the east. By about 1925, however, Eyrarbakki lost its importance as a trading centre. The latter part of the 19th century saw a great increase in the number of oared fishing boats. In fact, although trade and fishing were the main occupations in Eyrarbakki, the natural harbour conditions were not good, and after the bridging of the nearby River Ölfusá, the harbour fell into disuse.

In 985 C.E., Bjarni Herjólfsson, a young merchant, sailed from Eyrarbakki headed for Greenland, but instead reached as far as North America. Upon his arrival in Greenland, Bjarni told Leif Eriksson of his discovery and sold him his boat, which Eriksson used for his own journey to North America.

The oldest building in the village, Húsið ("The House"), is a Norwegian kit home dating from 1765 and is the oldest preserved timber dwelling house in Iceland. It now houses the Árnesinga Folk Museum.

The church in Eyrarbakki was built in 1890; its altarpiece was painted by Queen Louise of Denmark, wife of King Christian IX, great-great-grandfather of Margrethe II of Denmark, Elizabeth II of the United Kingdom and King Harald V of Norway.

The primary school, established in 1852, is the oldest in the country. Today Eyrarbakki is like a museum with many interesting old houses that the village and residents have renovated. The town is of great historical importance because of its role in fishing and trading history.

== Economy ==
The most recent enterprises in Eyrarbakki have been a fish-processing plant, and an aluminum frying-pan plant. However, the main fish factory closed in the 1990s, and the frying-pan factory has closed as well. The nearby prison, Litla-Hraun, the largest in Iceland, is one of the town's main employers. In addition, there are a few small farms, with the traditional Icelandic horse breed. Tourism is another mainstay of the small economy.

== Climate ==
Eyrarbakki has a subarctic climate (Köppen Dfc). The average annual temperature in Eyrarbakki is 4.1 °C (39.4 °F). The average annual rainfall is 1,372.6 mm (54.04 in) with October as the wettest month. The temperatures are highest on average in July, at around 10.8 °C (51.4 °F), and lowest in January, at around −1.1 °C (30.0 °F). The highest temperature ever recorded in Eyrarbakki was 27.5 °C (81.5 °F) on 30 July 2008; the coldest temperature ever recorded was −19.8 °C (−3.6 °F) on 13 December 1964.

Climate data for Eyrarbakki, 1961–1990 normals, extremes 1957–2016
Month	Jan	Feb	Mar	Apr	May	Jun	Jul	Aug	Sep	Oct	Nov	Dec	Year
Record high °C (°F)	10.5 (50.9)	9.3 (48.7)	12.1 (53.8)	14.0 (57.2)	19.8 (67.6)	22.6 (72.7)	27.5 (81.5)	25.5 (77.9)	18.5 (65.3)	14.1 (57.4)	11.0 (51.8)	10.8 (51.4)	27.5 (81.5)
Mean daily maximum °C (°F)	1.6 (34.9)	2.5 (36.5)	3.2 (37.8)	6.0 (42.8)	9.7 (49.5)	12.1 (53.8)	13.9 (57.0)	13.4 (56.1)	10.4 (50.7)	6.7 (44.1)	3.0 (37.4)	1.9 (35.4)	7.0 (44.6)
Daily mean °C (°F)	−1.1 (30.0)	−0.1 (31.8)	0.1 (32.2)	2.8 (37.0)	6.4 (43.5)	9.2 (48.6)	10.8 (51.4)	10.2 (50.4)	7.0 (44.6)	3.8 (38.8)	0.5 (32.9)	−0.9 (30.4)	4.1 (39.4)
Mean daily minimum °C (°F)	−4.1 (24.6)	−2.8 (27.0)	−2.6 (27.3)	−0.1 (31.8)	3.0 (37.4)	6.4 (43.5)	7.8 (46.0)	7.2 (45.0)	4.2 (39.6)	1.4 (34.5)	−2.3 (27.9)	−4.0 (24.8)	1.2 (34.2)
Record low °C (°F)	−19.7 (−3.5)	−19.3 (−2.7)	−18.9 (−2.0)	−18.8 (−1.8)	−8.1 (17.4)	−3.0 (26.6)	1.4 (34.5)	−1.1 (30.0)	−5.8 (21.6)	−14.9 (5.2)	−17.9 (−0.2)	−19.8 (−3.6)	−19.8 (−3.6)
Average precipitation mm (inches)	126.3 (4.97)	121.7 (4.79)	123.3 (4.85)	102.2 (4.02)	83.6 (3.29)	94.9 (3.74)	87.0 (3.43)	114.9 (4.52)	117.1 (4.61)	139.3 (5.48)	128.5 (5.06)	133.1 (5.24)	1,372.6 (54.04)
Average precipitation days (≥ >1.0 mm)	15.9	15.2	16.5	14.7	12.4	13.6	12.6	13.0	14.5	16.7	14.8	17.1	177.4
Source: Iceland Meteorological Office
