= Roads in Iceland =

This article covers road transportation in Iceland.

== History ==
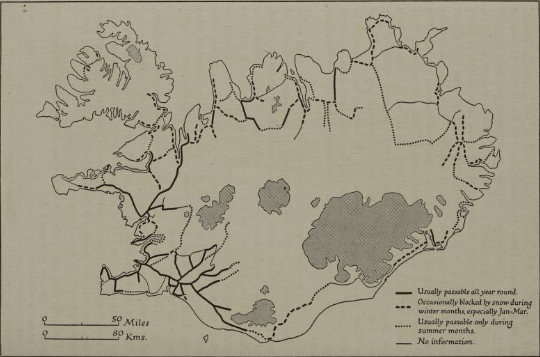
British War Office map showing major roads in Iceland, circa 1942

As late as 1900 Iceland had only a few miles of roading suitable for wheeled transport, mostly located in the southern regions of the island. A network of bridle paths permitted travel and transport elsewhere. In 1884 a Norwegian expert was brought in to organise the construction of proper roads. Beginning in 1888 a series of iron bridges were constructed to cross major rivers. In 1894 a Road Act was passed classifying Icelandic roads into four categories. The first were "High Roads" (also called "National Roads") that were entirely funded by the state. The second were "Provincial Roads" that were funded by the provinces except where they were could be used for carriage-transport, in which case there were subsidised by the state for up to half their cost. The third category was that of "Parish Roads" which were of local importance and funded by individual parishes. The fourth category was "Mountain Roads", which cross mountainous and upland regions and were largely bridle-paths marked by stone-cairns erected at the expense of the state.

Annual expenditure of road-building rose from 23 thousand krónur on average between 1876 and 1893 to 1,859 in 1939, and between 1899 and 1929 a total of 159 bridges of 10 metres in length or longer were constructed. In 1913 the first motor-vehicles arrived in Iceland, with the number reaching more than 400 in 1925. By 1933 around 3,000 km of motor-routes had been built on the island, with around 3000 motor cars being in use on Icelandic roads by 1935 according to one estimate. A different estimate published by the British Royal Naval Intelligence division put the total length of roads in Iceland in 1936 at 4,400 km, of which 2,800 km were motorable, with nearly all the motorable roads being in the coastal regions in the west of Iceland. The same Naval Intelligence study put the total number of motor vehicles on the island at 2,225 in 1940, of which 835 were motor cars, 1,120 trucks, and the rest buses and motor cycles. This network of motorable roads linking Reykjavik to Akureyri was central to the German invasion plan under Operation Ikarus, which relied on motorised troops landed at Reykjavik and Akureyri to advance quickly along it in order to take control of the island in four days.

By 1942 regular bus-services were operating between Reykjavik and Akureyri on the northern coast, with the journey taking two 12-hour days if conducted entirely by bus. At the same time a private company also operated an internal bus service for the Reykjavik area called Strætisvagnar Reykjavikur, operating around 20 single-decker buses.

== Road types ==
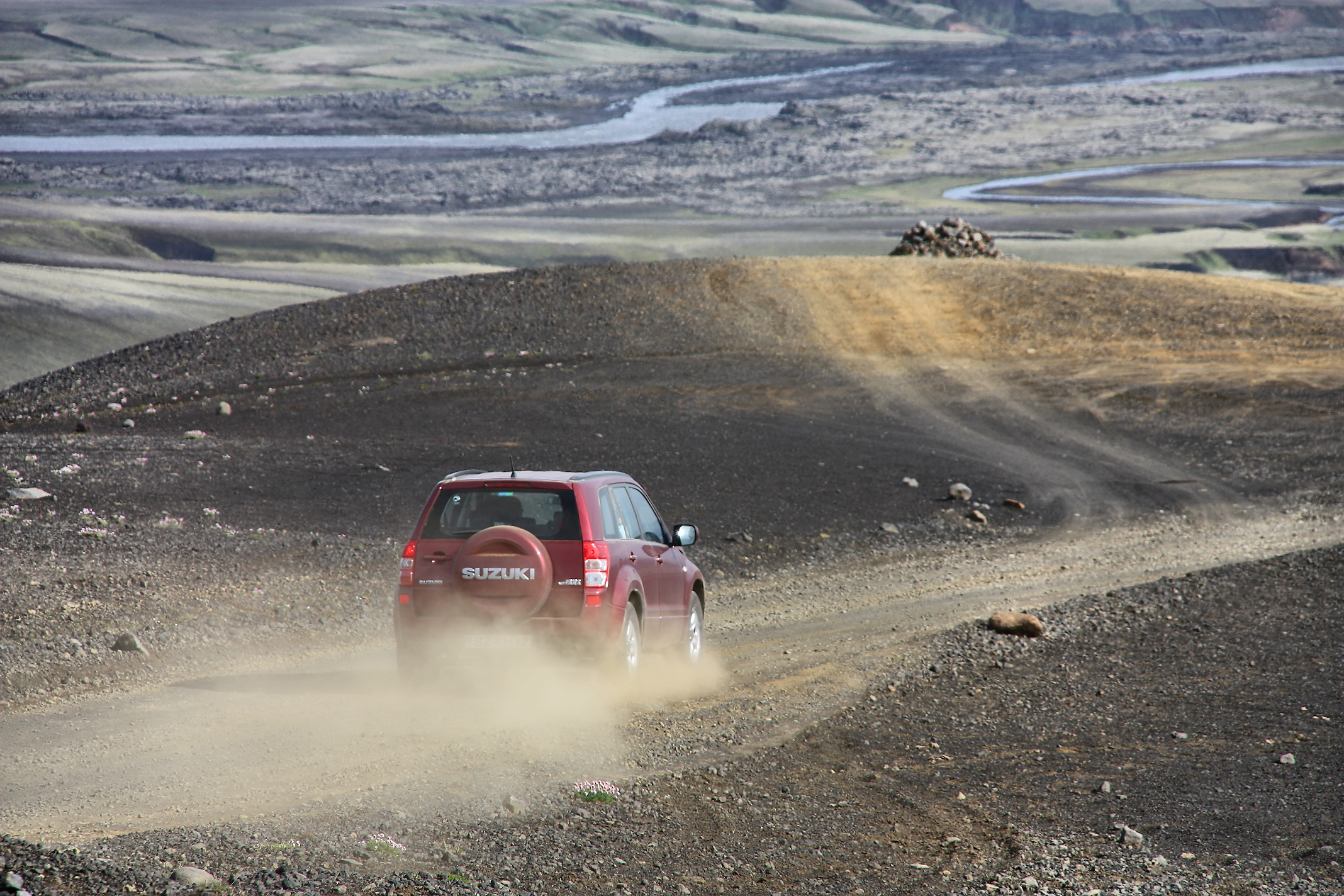
Driving on an unpaved road in the Highlands of Iceland

=== National roads ===
Roads belonging to the national highway system are maintained by the Icelandic Road Administration. They are categorized into the following types:

- Primary Road (S) - all roads belonging to the so-called Grid Icelandic transport.
  - Primary highland road
- Secondary road (T) - are the roads that connect institutions and tengivegi, and are generally over 10 km in length.
- Local access (H) - Roads to individual farms and regional connections that do not qualify tengivega (district roads with four-digit numbers are not listed here).
- Highland (L) - ways that can not be considered for any of the above standards, as well as all mountain roads.

=== Other roads ===
F roads are unpaved tracks that may only be driven in vehicles with four-wheel drive. Some include unbridged rivers that must be forded. Trying to drive on an F-road with a normal passenger car means a large risk of being stuck outside of phone coverage and is a breach of Icelandic traffic law, for which one can get a fine.

== Road numbering scheme ==
The Icelandic road numbering scheme is made up of eight numbering zones which divide the island and mostly follow the division into regions. Each numbering zone has a number which determines what the first digit of the number is.

=== Division by zones ===
The first digits of the numbers are divided as follows (see Regions of Iceland):

- The Ring Road which circles Iceland has the number 1 and it is the only number starting with number 1 (there are no such numbers as 10-19 or 100-199).
- Numbers starting with 2 are in Eastern South Iceland, which is divided by the Þjórsá river.
- Numbers starting with 3 are in Western South Iceland, which is divided by the Þjórsá river.
- Numbers starting with 4 are in Reykjavík and vicinity and on the Reykjanes peninsula.
- Numbers starting with 5 are in West Iceland.
- Numbers starting with 6 are in the Westfjords.
- Numbers starting with 7 are in Western North Iceland, which is divided in the middle of Tröllaskagi peninsula.
- Numbers starting with 8 are in Eastern North Iceland, which is divided in the middle of Tröllaskagi peninsula.
- Numbers starting with 9 are in East Iceland.

=== Categorization by digits ===
There are no numbers other than for the Ring Road (number 1) consisting of only one digit (there are no such numbers as 2-9). Other numbers can have two or three digits. They are divided as follows:

- Numbers with two digits are used on the main roads of the road system (other than the Ring Road).
- Numbers with three digits consist of other roads of significant length in the areas.
- There are also some numbers with the prefix F with either two or three digits, usually derived from similar non F-numbered roads (they can be an extension of said road). These numbers stand for roads which are generally impassable for vehicles which are not capable of four-wheel driving.

== List of roads ==
=== Roads with one-digit numbers ===
Number	From/to	Notes
1	Via Reykjavík, Borgarnes, Blönduós, Akureyri, Egilsstaðir, Höfn, Vík, Hella, Selfoss and finally back to Reykjavík.	Circular. Often called the "Ring Road."

=== Roads with two-digit numbers ===
The first number (2 to 9) indicates the region of Iceland where the road is located.

Number	Name	From	To	Notes
22	Dalavegur	Básaskersbryggja, Vestmannaeyjar harbour	Vestmannaeyjar Airport	
25	Þykkvabæjarvegur	1 at Hella	275 at Þykkvabær	
26	Landvegur	1 near Hella	Kvíslavegur	Becomes F26 Mountain Road north of Þórisvatn
F26	Sprengisandsleið	26 near at Versalir	842 near Mýri/Bólstaður in Bárðardalur, North Iceland	
30	Skeiða- og Hrunamannavegur	1 east of Selfoss	35 at Kjóastaðir	
31	Skálholtsvegur	30 at Sandlækur	35 at Spóastaðir	Via Laugarás and Skálholt
32	Þjórsárdalsvegur	30 at Sandlækur	26 near Sultartangalón	
33	Gaulverjabæjarvegur	1 at Selfoss	34 near Stokkseyri	
34	Eyrarbakkavegur	1 at Selfoss	38 north of Þorlákshöfn	
35	Biskupstungnabraut	1 at Selfoss	732 near Eiðsstaðir	Becomes F35 Mountain Road between Gullfoss and Eiðsstaðir
F35	Kjalvegur	35 by Gullfoss	1 at Langidalur	Former F35 is now road 35.
36	Þingvallavegur	1 at Mosfellsbær	35 at Öndverðarnes	Via Þingvellir
37	Laugarvatnsvegur	35 at Svínavatn	35 near Geysir	Via Laugarvatn
38	Þorlákshafnarvegur	1 at Hveragerði	Þorlákshöfn	
39	Þrengslavegur	1 between Reykjavík and Hveragerði	38 at Sléttahraun	
40	Hafnarfjarðarvegur	Reykjavík	41 at Hafnarfjörður	
41	Reykjanesbraut	450 at Reykjavík	Leifur Eiríksson Air Terminal at Keflavík International Airport	Via Keflavík. To a large part built like a motorway.
42	Krýsuvíkurvegur	41 at Vellir	38 at Sléttahraun	
43	Grindavíkurvegur	41 near Vogar	427 at Grindavík	
44	Hafnavegur	41 at Njarðvíkur	425 at Hafnir	
45	Garðskagavegur	41 at Keflavik	44 at Hafnir	Via Garður and Sandgerði
46		41 at Njarðvíkur	41 west of Keflavík	Former 41 through Keflavík.
47	Hvalfjarðarvegur	1 at Saurbær	1 at Hagamelur	Former 1 around Hvalfjörður.
48	Kjósarskarðsvegur	47 near Háls	36 west of Þingvellir	
49	Nesbraut	1 at Gufuneskirkjugarður	Seltjarnarnes	Via Reykjavík.
50	Borgarfjarðarbraut	1 near Grjóteyri	1 at Haugar	
51	Akrafjallsvegur	1 at Hagamelur	1 at Innri-Hólmur	Via Akranes
52	Uxahryggjavegur	53 at Hvítarvellir	36 at Þingvellir	
53		1 near Eskiholt	50 near Hvanneyri	
54	Snæfellsnesvegur	1 near Borg á Mýrum	60 near Álfheimar	Snæfellsnesvegur, via Fróðárheiði - Ólafsvík - Grundarfjörður
55	Heydalsvegur	54 at Tröð	57 at Bíldhóll	
56	Vatnaleið	54 at Vegamót	57 near Berserkjahraun	
57		60 at Stóriskógur	54 east of Ólafsvík	
58	Stykkishólmsvegur	57 near Gríshóll	Stykkishólmur	
59	Laxárdalsvegur	60 south of Búðardalur	61 near Borðeyri	
60	Vestfjarðavegur	1 at Dalsmynni	61 west of Ísafjörður	
61	Djúpvegur	1 south of Melar	630 at Bolungarvík	Via Ísafjörður
62	Barðastrandarvegur	60 at Smiðjunes	63 at Geirseyri	
63	Bíldudalsvegur	60 near Ísufell	62 at Geirseyri	
64	Flateyrarvegur	60 at Veðrara-Ytri	Flateyri	
65	Súgandafjarðarvegur	60 at Botnsheiði	Suðureyri	
F66	Kollafjarðarheiði	60 near Klettur	61 at Laugaból	F66 Mountain Road throughout entire length.
67	Hólmavíkurvegur	61 near Hólmavík	Höfðatún street, Hólmavík	
68	Innstrandavegur	1 in Hrútafjörður	61 near Hólmavík	
69		60 near Litla Holt	68 near Fjarðarhorn	Still marked on a road sign near Gilsfjarðarbrekka but the route seems renamed to 690
72	Hvammstangavegur	1 near Stóri-Ós	711 at Hvammstangi	
74	Skagastrandarvegur	1 east of Blönduós	745 at Skagaströnd	
75	Sauðárkróksbraut	1 at Varmahlíð	76 near Narfastaðir	Via Sauðárkrókur
76	Siglufjarðarvegur	1 east of Vellir	793 at Siglufjörður	
77	Hofsósbraut	76 near Hofsós	76 near Hofsós	Goes through the village of Hofsós where it changes to a street in the village and then back to road 77
82	Ólafsfjarðarvegur	1 north-west of Akureyri	76 at Nýrækt	Via Dalvík and Ólafsfjörður. Goes through Múlagöng tunnel.
83	Grenivíkurvegur	1 north of Garðsvík	Grenivík	
85	Norðausturvegur	1 near Kross	1 at Axlir	Via Húsavík
87	Kísilvegur	1 at Reykjahlíð	85 at Laxamýri	
F88	Öskjuleið	1 at Hrossaborgarlind	910 near Víkursandur	F88 Mountain pass throughout entire length.
91	Hafnarvegur í Bakkafirði	85 south-west of Bakki	Bakkafjörður	
92	Norðfjarðarvegur	1 at Egilsstaðir	Neskaupstaður	Via Reyðarfjörður and Eskifjörður
93	Seyðisfjarðarvegur	94 at Egilsstaðir	951 at Seyðisfjörður	
94	Borgarfjarðarvegur	92 at Egilsstaðir	946/947 at Borgarfjörður	
96	Suðurfjarðavegur	1 Breiðdalsvík	92 near Búðareyri	Via Búðir
97	Breiðdalsvíkurvegur	1 near Breiðdalsvík	96 near Breiðdalsvík	Goes through the village of Breiðdalsvík
98	Djúpavogsvegur	1 near Djúpivogur	Djúpivogur harbour	
99	Hafnarvegur	1 near Ártún	Höfn	

=== Roads with three-digit numbers ===
The first number (2 to 9) indicates the region of Iceland where the road is located.

Number	Name	From	To	Notes
201	Vallavegur	1 near Núpar	1 near Kálfafell	
202	Prestbakkavegur	1 next to Breiðbalakvísl	Mörtunga 1	
203	Geirlandsvegur	1 at Kirkjubæjarklaustur	Geirland	
204	Meðallandsvegur	1 close to Kirkjubæjarklaustur	1 next to Kúðafljót	
205	Klausturvegur	1 next to Kirkjubæjarklaustur	Kirkjubæjarklaustur 2	The main street in the village of Kirkjubæjarklaustur
206	Holtsvegur	1 next to Ytri-Dalbær	Hunkubakkar	Becomes F206 at Hunkubakkar
F206	Lakavegur	Hunkubakkar	Car park at Laki	
F207	Lakagígavegur	Car park at Laki	F206 east of Blágil	Forms a circular route along with F206 around Laki craters
208	Skaftártunguvegur	1 next to Eldvatn	Búland	Becomes F208 at Búland
F208	Fjallabaksleið nyrðri	Búland	26 at Sigalda	Turns back into 208 when passing F224 close to Landmannalaugar
209	Hrífunesvegur	1 close to Laufskálavarða	208 next to Tungufljót	
210	Ljótarstaðavegur	208 close to Grafarkirkja	Snæbýli	Becomes F210 at Snæbýli
F210	Fjallabaksleið syðri	Snæbýli	264 close to Keldur	
211	Álftaversvegur	1 next to Skálm river	Þykkvabæjarklaustur	
212	Hryggjavegur	Þykkvabæjarklaustur	211 close to Holt 2	
214	Kerlingardalsvegur	1 at Höfðabrekka	Þakgil	
215	Reynishverfisvegur	1 north of Reynisfjall	Reynisfjara carpark	
216	Þórisholtsvegur	215 close to Reyniskirkja	Þórisholt	
218	Dyrhólavegur	1 across from Litli Hvammur	Dyrhólaey Lighthouse	
219	Péturseyjarvegur	1 west of Klifandi river	1 close to Sólheimavöllur	
221	Sólheimajökulsvegur	1 east of Jökulsá á Sólheimasandi	Sólheimajökull	
222	Mýrdalsjökulsvegur	1 at Ytri Sólheimar	Mýrdalsjökull	
F224	Landmannalaugavegur	208 at Sólvangur	Landmannalaugar	
F223	Eldgjárvegur	F208 next to Stangakvísl	Eldgjá	
F225	Landmannaleið	26 across from Búrfell	208 next to Frostastaðavatn	
F228	Veiðivatnaleið	26 north of Krókslón	Veiðivatnaskáli	
F229	Jökulheimaleið	F228 south east of Þórisvatn	Jökulheimar	
F232	Öldufellsleið	209 close to Hrífunes	F210 close to Hólmsá river	
F233	Álftavatnskrókur	F208 north west of Hólaskjól	F210 next to Hólmsá river	
F235	Langisjór	F208 east of Skuggafjöll	Langisjór	
239	Eldfellsvegur	Skansinn	Car park north east of Eldfell	
240	Stórhöfðavegur	Hamarsvegur/Höfðavegur	Stórhöfði	
242	Raufarfellsvegur	1 at Kaldaklifsá	1 at Svaðbæli	
243	Leirnavegur	1 at Svaðbælisá	1 at Steinar	
245	Hverfisvegur	1 at Holt	1 at Írá	
246	Skálavegur	1 west of Holtsá	1 east of Hvammur	
247	Sandhólmavegur	1 at Hvammur	1 at Heimaland	
248	Merkurvegur	249 at Litli Dímon	Stóra Mörk 2	
249	Þórsmerkurvegur	1 south of Seljalandsfoss	Jökultungur	Becomes F249 at Jökultungur
F249	Þórsmerkurvegur	Jökultungur	Básar carpark	
250	Dímonarvegur	Intersection between 1 and 251	261 next to Múlakot	
251	Hólmabæjavegur	Intersection between 1 and 250	253 next to Búðarhóll 2	
252	Landeyjavegur	253 at Gunnarshólmi	1 next to Þverá	
253	Bakkavegur	1 at Spjaralækur	254 north of Landeyjahöfn	
254	Landeyjahafnarvegur	1 on Markarfljótsaurar	Landeyjahöfn	
255	Akureyjarvegur	1 next to Hemla 2	252 south west of Akurey	
261	Fljótshlíðarvegur	1 at Hvolsvöllur	Fljótsdalur	Becomes F261 at Fljótsdalur
F261	Emstruleið	Fljótsdalur	F210 south west of Hvanngil	
262	Vallarvegur	261 east of Hvolsvöllur	Árgilsstaðir 2	
264	Rangárvallavegur	1 north west of Eystri Rangá	1 east of Hella	
266	Oddavegur	1 next to Varða	Sólvellir	
267	Selalækjarvegur	1 next to Varmidalur	Selalækur 4	
268	Þingskálavegur	264 west of Gunnarsholt	26 at Gamli Merkihvoll	
271	Árbæjarvegur	1 next to Ægissíða 3	26 close to Kaldakinn	
272	Bjallavegur	271 south west from Austvaðsholt	26 next to Þúfa	
273	Bugavegur	1 next to Efri-Rauðalækur	Kastalabrekka	
275	Ásvegur	1 at Vegamót	Sandhólaferja	
281	Sumarliðabæjavegur	1 south from Sléttaland	26 close to Þjóðólfshagi 3	
282	Ásmundarstaðavegur	1 east from Áshóll	Ásmundarstaðir 1	
284	Heiðarvegur	1 north from Húsar	286 north of Rafholt	
286	Hagabraut	26 next to Lýtingur	26 next to Pulutjörn	
288	Kálfholtsvegur	1 next to Einbúi	1 at Lónsheiði	
302	Urriðafossvegur	1 north of Urriðafoss	305 at Þjórsárver	
303	Ölvisholtsvegur	1 at Kjartansstaðir	Brúnastaðir 2	
304	Oddgeirshólavegur	1 at Heiðargerði	Oddgeirshólar 1	
305	Villingaholtsvegur	1 at Heiðargerði	33 south of Vestri-Hellur	
308	Hamarsvegur	33 at Gaulverjabær	305 south of Þjórsárver	
309	Kolsholtsvegur	305 west of Vatnsendi	Kolholtshellir	
310	Votmúlavegur	34 close to Hraunprýði	33 east of Smjördalir	
311	Önundarholtsvegur	33 north of Austur-Meðalholt	305 close to Orrustudalur	
312	Vorsabæjarvegur í Flóa	33 west of Seljatunga	308 next to Syðri-Völlur	
314	Holtsvegur	33 next to Klængssel	Stokkseyri	
316	Kaldaðarnesvegur	34 close to Stóra Sandvík	Kaldaðarnes	
318	Langholtsvegur	1 across from Tún	Langholt 2	
321	Skeiðháholtsvegur	30 across from Langamýri	Skeiðháholt	
322	Ólafsvallavegur	30 across from Blesastaðir	Ólafsvallakirkja	
324	Vorsabæjarvegur	30 at Húsatóftir	31 south of Ósabakki	
325	Gnúpverjavegur	32 next to Kálfá	32 next to Þverá	
326	Hælsvegur	325 next to Eystra Geldingaholt	Steinsholt	
327	Stangarvegur	32 close to Búrfellsvirkjun	Stöng	Ends next to Stöng, ruins of an old Icelandic longhouse
328	Stóra-Núpsvegur	32 next to Minni Núpur	325 next to Mön	
329	Mástunguvegur	325 close to Ás	Laxárdalur	
332	Háafossvegur	32 southwest of Sultartangi	Háifoss	Ends at Háifoss, second tallest waterfall in Iceland
333	Haukadalsvegur	35 next to Geysir	Haukadalskirkja	Turns into F333 at Haukadalskirkja
F333	Haukadalsvegur	Haukadalskirkja	F338 south of Sandvatn	
334	Gullfossvegur	35 close to Gullfoss	Car park at Gullfoss Waterfall	
F335	Hagavatnsvegur	35 next to Sandá	Hut close to Hagavatn	
336	Skálpanesvegur	35 on Bláfellsháls	Hut next to Langjökull glacier	
337	Hlöðuvallavegur	37 north of Laugarvatn	Miðdalur	Turns into F337 at Miðdalur
F337	Hlöðuvallavegur	Miðdalur	F338 next to Þórólfsfell	
F338	Skjaldbreiðarvegur	35 5 km north of Gullfoss	550 next to Brunnavatn	
340	Auðsholtsvegur	30 next to Stóra Laxá	Auðsholt	
341	Langholtsvegur	340 next to Holtabyggð	Flúðir	
343	Álfsstétt	34 across from Stekkjarvað	Eyrarbakki	
344	Hrunavegur	30 at Flúðir	30 at Kirkjuskarð	
345	Kaldbaksvegur	344 at Hruni	Kaldbakur	
F347	Kerlingarfjallavegur	35 south of Svartárbotnar	Huts in Kerlingarfjöll	
349	Tungufellsvegur	30 next to Hlíð	Tungufell	
350	Grafningsvegur neðri	35 across from Þrastalundur	360 west of Ljósifoss	
351	Búrfellsvegur	36 at Ásgarður	35 close to Klausturhólar	
353	Kiðjabergsvegur	35 across from Hallkelshólar	Kiðjaberg	
354	Sólheimavegur	35 at Borg í Grímsnesi	35 next to Flatholt	Goes past Sólheimar
355	Reykjavegur	35 at Vegatunga	37 north of Efri-Reykir	
356	Tjarnarvegur	35 close to Vatnsleysa	355 next to Hádegissteinar	
358	Einholtsvegur	Drumboddstaðavegur	359 at Stóra-Smáholt	
359	Bræðratunguvegur	30 at Flúðir	35 east of Fell	
360	Grafningsvegur efri	36 south of Ljósifoss	36 west of Þingvallavatn	
361	Vallavegur	36 next to Þingvellir National park service center	36 on the east side of Þingvallavatn	
362	Efrivallavegur	361	Þingvellir church	
363	Valhallarvegur	361 next to Silfra	Valhöll parking	
364	Eyjavegur	37 next to Eyjarland	Austurey 1	
365	Lyngdalsheiðarvegur	37 at Laugarvatn	36 next to Miðfell	
366	Böðmóðsstaðavegur	37 across from Laugardalshólar	Böðmóðsstaðir	
367	Laugarvatnshellavegur	365 on Lyngdalsheiði	Laugarvatnshellar	
374	Hvammsvegur	1 west of Kögunarhóll	1 west of Kotströnd	
375	Arnarbælisvegur	1 next to Sandhóll	Ósgerði	
376	Breiðamörk	1 in Hveragerði	Reykjakot	
378	Skíðaskálavegur	1 close to Hellisheiðarvirkjun	1 next to Hveradalir ski hut	
379	Hafnarvegur Þorlákshöfn	38 on the outskirts of Þorlákshöfn	Þorlákshöfn harbor	
380	Hlíðarendavegur	39 west of Ytri Grímslækur	Hlíðarendi	
407	Bláfjallaleið	417	Suðurgil, Ármannsskáli	
411	Arnarnesvegur	On bridge across 40	Rjúpnavegur	
413	Breiðholtsbraut	Mjódd	1 at Rauðavatn	
414	Flugvallarvegur Reykjavík	49	Reykjavík Airport	
415	Álftanesvegur	40	416	
416	Bessastaðavegur	415	Bessastaðir	
417	Bláfjallavegur	1 next to Sandskeið	42	
418	Bústaðavegur	40	49	
420	Vatnsleysustrandarvegur	Roundabout across from the road to Keilir	421	
421	Vogavegur	41	Vogar	
423	Miðnesheiðarvegur	45	429	
424	Keflavíkurvegur	41	Njarðvík harbour	
425	Nesvegur	44	43	
426	Bláalónsvegur	43	425	
427	Suðurstrandarvegur	43	38	
428	Vigdísarvallavegur	42	427	
429	Sandgerðisvegur	41	45	
434	Skálafellsvegur	36	Skiing area at Skálafell	
435	Nesjavallaleið	1	360	
443	Reykjanesvitavegur	425	Reykjanesviti car park	
450		41 at Laugarnes	1 at Mosfellsbær	Proposed
453	Sundagarðar	41	Eimskip	
454	Holtavegur	41	Holtabakki	
458	Brautarholtsvegur	1	Brautarholt 11	
460	Eyrarfjallsvegur	47	47	
461	Meðalfellsvegur	47	48	
470	Fjarðarbraut	Ástorg	Harbour area	
501	Innra-Hólmsvegur	503	Innri-Hólmur	
502	Svínadalsvegur	47	520	
503	Innnesvegur	51	Akranes, Leynisbraut	
504	Leirársveitarvegur	1	502	
505	Melasveitarvegur	1 at Skorholt	1 at Belgsholt	
506	Grundartangavegur	1	Harbour area, Grundartangi	
507	Mófellsstaðavegur	50	520	
508	Skorradalsvegur	50	Fitjar	Turns into F508 at Fitjar
F508	Skorradalsvegur	Fitjar	52	
509	Akranesvegur	51	Akranes harbour	
510	Hvítárvallavegur	1	50	
511	Hvanneyrarvegur	50	Hvanneyri	
512	Lundarreykjadalsvegur	50	52	
513	Bæjarsveitarvegur	50	Laugarholt	
514	Hvítárbakkavegur	513	Hvítárbakki 1	
515	Flókadalsvegur	50 north of Varmilækur	50 at Litlikroppur	
517	Reykdælavegur	50	519	
518	Hálsasveitarvegur	50	550	
519	Reykholtsdalsvegur	518 at Úlfsstaðir	523	
520	Dragavegur	47	52	
522	Þverárhlíðarvegur	52 close to Bakkakot	52 close to Kljáfoss	
523	Hvítársíðuvegur	522	550	
526	Stafholtsvegur	50	Svarfhóll	
527	Varmalandsvegur	50	Varmalandsskóli	
528	Norðurárdalsvegur	1 east of Bifröst	1 next to Krókur	
530	Ferjubakkavegur	1	510	
532	Rauðanesvegur	54	Rauðanes 1	
533	Álftaneshreppsvegur	54 next to Langá	54 at Arnarstapi	
534	Álftanesvegur	533	Álftanes	
535	Grímsstaðavegur	54	Grímsstaðir	
536	Stangarholtsvegur	54	Jarðlangsstaðir	
537	Skíðsholtsvegur	54	Skíðsholt	
539	Hítardalsvegur	54	Hítarvatn	
540	Hraunhreppsvegur	54	533	
550	Kaldadalsvegur	36	at Geitland near Húsafell	
551	Langjökulsvegur	550	Langjökull glacier edge	
552	Barnafossvegur	518	Barnafoss	
553	Langavatnsvegur	1	Langavatn	
555	Deildartunguvegur	50	Deildartunguhver	
558	Berserkjahraunsvegur	54 near Grákúla	54 in Hraunsfjörður	
567	Kolviðarnesvegur	54	Kolviðarnes	
568	Skógarnesvegur	54	Syðra-Skógarnes	
570	Jökulhálsleið	574 east of Ólafsvík	574 at the foot of Stapafell, near Arnarstapi	Lies near the edge of Snæfellsjökull glacier
571	Ölkelduvegur	54	Ölkelda 2	
572	Dritvíkurvegur	574	Djúpalón	From the end of the road there is short walk to see Djúpalónssandur and Dritvík.
573	Rifshafnarvegur	574	Rifshöfn	
574	Útnesvegur	54 near Hraunhöfn	54 close to Varmilækur	
F575	Eysteinsdalsleið	570	574	
576	Framsveitarvegur	54	Nýjabúð	
577	Helgafellssveitarvegur	54 at Gríshólsá	54 in Berserkjahraun	
578	Arnarvatnsvegur	523	704	Turns into F578 for part of the way and then back into 578.
F578	Arnarvatnsvegur	Carpark at Stefánshellir	Hut at Arnarvatn	This highland road goes across Arnarvatnsheiði
579	Öndverðarnesvegur	574	Öndverðarnes	
580	Hörðudalsvegur vestri	54	Bjarmaland	
581	Hörðudalsvegur eystri	54	Seljaland	
582	Hálsbæjavegur	60	54	
585	Hlíðarvegur	60 at Fellsendi	60 north of Tunguá	
586	Haukadalsvegur	60	Smyrlahóll	Turns into F586 at Smyrlahóll
F586	Haukadalsskarðsvegur	Smyrlahóll	1 in Hrútafjörður	
587	Hjarðarholtsvegur	60	Hróðnýjarstaðir	
588	Sámsstaðavegur	59	Sámsstaðir 1	
589	Sælingsdalsvegur	60	Laugaskóli	
590	Klofningsvegur	60 north of Ásgarður	60 at Skriðuland	
593	Orrahólsvegur	590	Orrahóll	
594	Staðarhólsvegur	590	Kjarlaksvellir	
602	Garpsdalsvegur	60	Garpsdalskirkja	
605	Geiradalsvegur	60	61	
606	Karlseyjarvegur	607	Karlsey	
607	Reykhólasveitarvegur	60	Árbær	
608	Þorskafjarðarvegur	60	61	
610	Brjánslækjarvegur	62	Brjánslækur, ferry pier	Connects to the ferry Baldur that sails across Breiðafjörður to Stykkishólmur
611	Siglunesvegur	62	Hreggsstaðir	
612	Örlygshafnarvegur	62	Bjargtangar	
614	Rauðasandsvegur	612	Melanesvegur	
615	Kollsvíkurvegur	612	Láginúpur	
617	Tálknafjarðarvegur	63	Stóri-Laugardalur	
619	Ketildalavegur	63 at Bíldudalur	Selárdalur	
620	Flugvallarvegur Bíldudal	63	Bíldudalur Airport	
621	Dynjandavegur	60	Dynjandi carpark	
622	Svalvogavegur	60 at Þingeyri	Lokinhamrar	
623	Flugvallarvegur Dýrafirði	622	Þingeyri Airport	
624	Ingjaldssandsvegur	60	Sæból 2	
625	Valþjófsdalsvegur	60	Kirkjuból	
626	Hrafnseyrarvegur	622 at Þingeyri	60 near Mjólkárvirkjun	Existing after Vestfjarðagöngur was built
627	Önundarfjarðarvegur	60 north of Mosvellir 1	60 north of Veðrará-Ytri	
628	Hjarðardalsvegur	60	Hjarðardalur	
629	Syðradalsvegur	61 in Bolungarvík	Hanhóll	
630	Skálavíkurvegur	Bolungarvík, Stigahlíð	Skálavík	
631	Flugvallarvegur Ísafirði	61	Ísafjörður Airport	
632	Laugardalsvegur	61	Laugaból	
633	Mjóafjarðarvegur	61 at Vatnsfjörður	61 at Kleifar	
634	Reykjanesvegur	61	Reykjanesskóli	
635	Snæfjallastrandarvegur	61	Unaðsdalskirkja	
636	Hafnarvegur Ísafirði	61 at a roundabout in Ísafjörður	Sindragata	
637	Seljalandsdalsvegur	Ísafjörður	Ski hut in Ísafjörður ski area	
638	Laugalandsvegur	635	Laugaland	
639	Skutulsfjarðarvegur	61 at Hauganes	61 across from Ísafjörður Airport	
640	Borðeyrarvegur	68	Borðeyri	
641	Krossárdalsvegur	68	Einfætingsgil	
643	Strandavegur	61	Bergistangi	
645	Drangsnesvegur	643 at Bassastaðir	643 at Hvammur	
646	Flugvallarvegur Gjögri	643	Gjögur Airport	
649	Ófeigsfjarðarvegur	643	Eyri in Ingólfsjförður	
F649	Ófeigsfjarðarvegur	Eyri in Ingólfsjförður	Hvalá river	
690	Steinadalsvegur	60	68	
701	Hrútatunguvegur	1 at Brú	1 at Staður	
702	Heggstaðanesvegur	1 east of Eyjanes	1 south of Barð	
703	Hálsabæjavegur	1	704	
704	Miðfjarðarvegur	1 north of Melstaður	1 at Laugarbakki	
705	Vesturárdalsvegur	704	Skeggjastaðir	
706	Neðra-Núpsvegur	704	Neðri-Núpur	
711	Vatnsnesvegur	Hvammstangi	1 at Spóaholt	
712	Þorgrímsstaðavegur	711	Katadalur	
713	Hvítserksvegur	711	Hvítserkur car park	
714	Fitjavegur	1	704	
715	Víðidalsvegur	1 at Steinholt	1 just north of Víðidalsá	
716	Síðuvegur	1	711	
717	Borgarvegur	716	711	
721	Þingeyravegur	1 at Ólafslundur	Þingeyrar	
722	Vatnsdalsvegur	1 at Ólafslundur	1 north of Hnausatjörn	
724	Reykjabraut	1	731	
725	Miðásavegur	1	Meðalheimur	
726	Auðkúluvegur	724	731	
727	Svínadalsvegur	726	Hrafnabjörg	
731	Svínvetningabraut	1 at Blönduós	1 north of Ártún	
733	Blöndudalsvegur	731	Bollastaðir	
734	Svartárdalsvegur	1 at Húnaver	Strangakvísl	Turns into F734 at Strangakvísl
F734	Vesturheiðarvegur	Strangakvísl	35	
735	Þjófadalavegur	35	Hveravellir	Turns into F735 at Hveravellir
F735	Þjófadalavegur	Hveravellir	Þjófadalir	
741	Neðribyggðarvegur	74 at Enni	74 at Neðri Lækjardalur	
742	Mýravegur	74	Mánaskál	
744	Þverárfjallsvegur	74 south of Laxá	75 in Sauðárkrókur	
745	Skagavegur	74 close to Skagaströnd	744	
746	Tindastólsvegur	744	Tindastóll skiing area	
748	Reykjastrandarvegur	744	Grettislaug car park	
749	Flugvallarvegur Sauðárkróki	75	Sauðárkrókur Airport	
751	Efribyggðarvegur	752 at Álftagerði	752 north of Mælifell	
752	Skagafjarðarvegur	1 south of Varmahlíð	Giljavegur	Turns into F752 at Giljavegur
F752	Skagafjarðarleið	Giljavegur	F26 next to Fjórðungsvatn	
753	Vindheimavegur	1 at Vellir	752	
754	Héraðsdalsvegur	752	Litlidalur	
755	Svartárdalsvegur	752 at Breið	Miðdalur	
756	Mælifellsdalsvegur	751	35 north of Blöndulón	
757	Villinganesvegur	752	Villinganes	
758	Austurdalsvegur	752	Ábæjarkirkja	
759	Kjálkavegur	1	Stekkjarflatir	
762	Sæmundarhlíðarvegur	75	Dæli	
764	Hegranesvegur	75	75	
766	Bakkavegur	76	Bakki	
767	Hólavegur	76	768	
768	Hjaltadalsvegur	767 next to Hjaltadalsá	Reykir	
769	Ásavegur	76	767	
781	Deildardalsvegur	76	Háleggsstaðir	
783	Höfðastrandarvegur	76 south of Hofsá	76 at Þrastarstaðir	
786	Sléttuhlíðarvegur	76 north of Hrolleifsár	Hraun	
787	Flókadalsvegur	76	Mið-Mór	
788	Haganesvíkurvegur	76 at Langhús	Vík	
789	Sléttuvegur	76	82	
792	Hafnarvegur Siglufirði	76	Siglufjörður harbour	
793	Skarðsvegur	76	76 next to Siglufjörður Airport	
801	Hafnarvegur Hrísey	Ferry harbour	Aðalgata	
802	Garðsvegur	76	Garður	
805	Svarfaðardalsvegur	82 south of Dalvík	Þorsteinsstaðir	
806	Tunguvegur	805	807	
807	Skíðadalsvegur	82	Klængshóll	
808	Árskógssandsvegur	82	Ferry harbour	The ferry connects Hrísey Island to mainland Iceland
809	Hauganesvegur	82	Hauganes	
810	Hafnarvegur Dalvík	82	Ferry harbour	The ferry connects Grímsey Island to mainland Iceland
811	Hjalteyrarvegur	82	Hjalteyri harbour	
812	Bakkavegur	82	811	
813	Möðruvallavegur	82 at Hof	82 at Möðruvellir	
814	Staðarbakkavegur	815	Staðarbakki 1	
815	Hörgárdalsvegur	1	82	
816	Dagverðareyrarvegur	1	82	
817	Blómsturvallavegur	1	Blómsturvellir	
818	Hlíðarvegur	1	Ásláksstaðir	
819	Hafnarvegur Akureyri	1	Akureyri harbour	
820	Flugvallarvegur Akureyri	821	Akureyri Airport	
821	Eyjafjarðarbraut vestri	1 in Akureyri	Halldórsstaðavegur	Becomes F821 at Halldórsstaðavegur
F821	Eyjafjarðarleið	Halldórsstaðavegur	F752	
822	Kristnesvegur	821	Kristnes	
823	Miðbraut	821	829	
824	Finnastaðavegur	821	825	
825	Dalsvegur	821	Stóri-Dalur	
826	Hólavegur	821 at Sandhólar	821 at Vatnsendi	
827	Sölvadalsvegur	826	Þormóðsstaðir	
828	Veigastaðavegur	1	829	
829	Eyjafjarðarbraut eystri	1	821	
830	Svalbarðseyrarvegur	1	Svalbarðseyri	
831	Höfðavegur	83	Höfði 1	
832	Vaðlaheiðarvegur	828	833	
833	Illugastaðavegur	1	Reykir 2	
834	Fnjóskadalsvegur vestri	1	Draflastaðakirkja	
835	Fnjóskadalsvegur eystri	1	83	
836	Vaglaskógarvegur	1	833	
837	Hlíðarfjallsvegur	Akureyri	Hlíðarfjall ski resort	
F839	Leirdalsheiðarvegur	83	Hvalvatnsfjörður	
841	Fremstafellsvegur	1	85	
842	Bárðardalsvegur vestri	1	F26	
843	Lundarbrekkuvegur	844	Svartárkot 2	
844	Bárðardalsvegur eystri	1	842	
845	Aðaldalsvegur	1	85	
846	Austurhlíðarvegur	1	845	
847	Stafnsvegur	1	Stafn	
848	Mývatnssveitarvegur	1 west of Arnarvatn	1 in Reykjahlíð	
849	Baldursheimsvegur	848	Baldursheimur 3	
851	Út-Kinnarvegur	85	Björg	
852	Sandsvegur	85	Sandur 2	
853	Hvammavegur	845	87	
854	Staðarbraut	845	853	
855	Fagranesvegur	854	Fagranes 1	
856	Laxárdalsvegur	854	Árhólar	
858	Flugvallarvegur í Aðaldal	85	Húsavík Airport	
859	Hafnarvegur Húsavík	85	Húsavík harbour	
860	Grjótagjárvegur	848	1	
861	Ásbyrgisvegur	85	Ásbyrgi, carpark	
862	Dettifossvegur	1	85	
863	Kröfluvegur	1	Leirhnúkur, walking path	
864	Hólsfjallavegur	1	85	
865	Gilsbakkavegur	85	Gilhagi 1	
866	Austursandsvegur	85	Akursel	
868	Laxárdalsvegur	85	Laxárdalur 2	
869	Langanesvegur	85 south of Þórshöfn	Skálar	
870	Sléttuvegur	85 south of Kópasker	Raufarhöfn	
871	Flugvallarvegur Þórshöfn	869	Þórshöfn Airport	
874	Raufarhafnarvegur	85	Raufarhöfn	
875	Hálsavegur	85	874	
F881	Dragaleið	F821	F26	
882	Leyningshólavegur	Villingadalsvegur	Leyningshólar	
883	Goðafossvegur	1	Goðafoss	
884	Dimmuborgavegur	848	Dimmuborgir	
885	Námaskarðsvegur	1	Hverarönd	
886	Dettifossvegur vestri	862	Dettifoss	
887	Tungnavegur	862	Hólmatungur carpark	
888	Vesturdalsvegur	862	Vesturdalur carpark	
890	Dettifossvegur eystri	864	Dettifoss	
F894	Öskjuvatnsvegur	F910	Öskjuvatn	
897	Svalbarðstunguvegur	85	Fjallalækjarsel	
F899	Flateyjardalsvegur	835	Brettingsstaðir	
901	Möðrudalsleið	1 east of Vegaskarð	1	
F902	Kverkfjallaleið	F910	Kverkjökull	
F903	Hvannalindavegur	F910	F902	Runs past Hvannalindir
F905	Arnardalsleið	901	F910	
907	Brúarvegur	901	923	
F909	Snæfellsleið	910	Eyjabakkajökull	
F910	Austurleið	F26	Kárahnjúkar dam	Turns into 910 at Kárahnjúkar dam
910	Austurleið	Kárahnjúkar dam	Laugarfell, carpark	
913	Strandhafnarvegur	85	Strandhöfn	
914	Skógavegur	85	85	
916	Flugvallarvegur Vopnafirði	917	Vopnafjörður Airport	
917	Hlíðarvegur	1	85 north of Vopnafjörður	
918	Hafnarvegur Vopnafirði	917	Vopnafjörður harbor	
919	Sunnudalsvegur	917	920	
920	Hofsárdalsvegur	917	Burstarfell, viewing point	
921	Eyjavegur	917	Hólmatunga	
922	Másselsvegur	917	Mássel	
923	Jökuldalsvegur	1	Aðalból	
F923	Jökuldalsvegur	Aðalból	910	
924	Jökuldalsvegur eystri	1	1	
925	Hróarstunguvegur	1	1	
926	Húseyjarvegur	925	Húsey 1	
927	Brekkubæjavegur	925 at Þórisvatn	925 at Litla Steinsvað	
929	Hafrafellsvegur	1	Hafrafell 4	
931	Upphéraðsvegur	1 in Fellabær	1 at Úlfsstaðir	
933	Fljótsdalsvegur	931 at Hjarðarból	931 at Gilsáreyri	
934	Múlavegur í Fljótsdal	933	Egilsstaðir	
935	Suðurdalsvegur	933	Sturluflöt	
936	Þórdalsheiðarvegur	1	96	
937	Skriðdalsvegur	931	1	
938	Múlavegur syðri	Skriðdalsvegur (937-02)	Hjarðarhlíð	
939	Axarvegur	1 in Skriðdalur	1 in Berufjörður	
941	Flugvallarvegur Egilsstöðum	1	Egilsstaðir Airport	
942	Steinsvaðsvegur	94	Tjarnarland	
943	Hjaltastaðarvegur	94	Dalir	
944	Lagarfossvegur	94	925	
946	Hólalandsvegur	94	Hvannstóð	
F946	Loðmundarfjarðarvegur	Hvannstóð	Klyppstaður	
947	Desjarmýrarvegur	Borgarfjörður, at Ós	Desjarmýri	
948	Gilsárteigsvegur	94	Gilsárteigur 1	
949	Þrándarstaðavegur	94	Þrep	
951	Vestdalseyrarvegur	Seyðisfjörður, Ránargata	Selsstaðir	
952	Hánefsstaðavegur	93	Hánefsstaðir	
953	Mjóafjarðarvegur	92	Dalatangi	
954	Helgustaðavegur	Mjóeyri	Stóra Breiðavík	
955	Vattarnesvegur	96 at Fáskrúðsfjarðargöng	96 west of Fáskrúðsfjörður	
958	Vöðlavíkurvegur	954	Vöðlavík	
F959	Viðfjarðarvegur	958	Viðfjörður	
962	Norðurdalsvegur í Breiðdal	1	Þorvaldsstaðir	
964	Breiðdalsvegur	1 at Heydalir	1 at Ós	
966	Suðurbyggðarvegur	1	964	
F980	Kollumúlavegur	1	Illikambur	
981	Almannaskarðsvegur	1	Almannaskarð, carpark	
982	Flugvallarvegur Hornafirði	1	Hornafjörður Airport	
983	Miðfellsvegur	984	Miðfell	
984	Hoffellsvegur	1	Hoffell 1	
F985	Jökulvegur	1	Skálafellsjökull ski cabin	
986	Rauðabergsvegur	1	Hlíðarberg	
987	Hornafjarðarvegur	1 near Hólmur	1 near Höfn	Originally a part of the ring road 1, but because it crossed a mountain range which can close in winter conditions, the 1 got a shortcut near Höfn through a bridge over Hornafjördur. The old part was subsequently renumbered to 987.
998	Skaftafellsvegur	1	Skaftafell Service center	

== See also ==
- Street names in Iceland
