= Route 38 (Iceland) =

Road in Iceland

Route 38

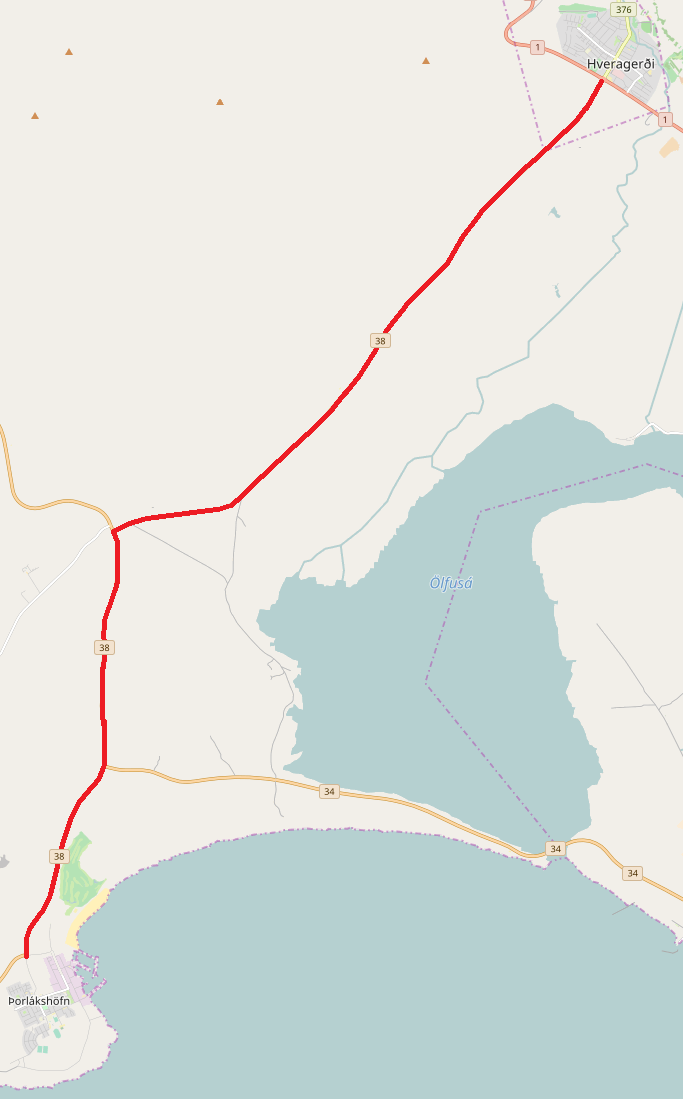

Route information
- Length: 19.15 km (11.90 mi)

Major junctions
- From: Route 1 at Hveragerði
- Þurá í Ölfusi; Route 39; Route 34 → Eyrarbakki
- To: Þorlákshöfn

Location
- Country: Iceland

Highway system
- Roads in Iceland

Þorlákshafnarvegur (lit. 'Þorlákshöfn Road'), designated as Route 38, is a national road located in the Southern Region of Iceland.

It begins at the roundabout of the ring road at Hveragerði and runs 19 km (12 mi) south-southwest to the ferry port of Þorlákshöfn. After 12 km (7.5 mi), it continues into Þrengslavegur. From the east, Eyrarbakkavegur, which comes from Selfoss and Eyrarbakki, merges into Þorlákshafnarvegur. Þorlákshafnarvegur ends at the roundabout in Þorlákshöfn, where Suðurstrandarvegur and Hafnarvegur Þorlákshöfn also join. The Suðurstrandarvegur runs along the south coast from Reykjanes to Grindavík.

The Þorlákshafnarvegur is entirely paved and was the main connection to the Herjólfur ferry to Heimaey until 2010. Since then, there has been the Landeyjahöfn with a significantly shorter sea route, which is threatened by silting up.
