= F88 =

F88 or F-88 may refer to:

- F88 Austeyr, an Australian variant of the Steyr AUG rifle
- HMS Broadsword (F88), a 1976 British Royal Navy Type 22 frigate
- HMS Malcolm (F88), a 1955 British Royal Navy Blackwood-class anti-submarine frigate
- Volvo F88, a 1968 truck
- McDonnell XF-88 Voodoo, a 1948 experimental US jet fighter
- Route F88 (Iceland), a highland road in Iceland
- Oldsmobile F-88, a dream car produced by General Motors in the 1950s
- F88, a consumer finance company active in Vietnam
