= Route 33 (Iceland) =

Road in Iceland

Route 33
- Gaulverjabæjarvegur
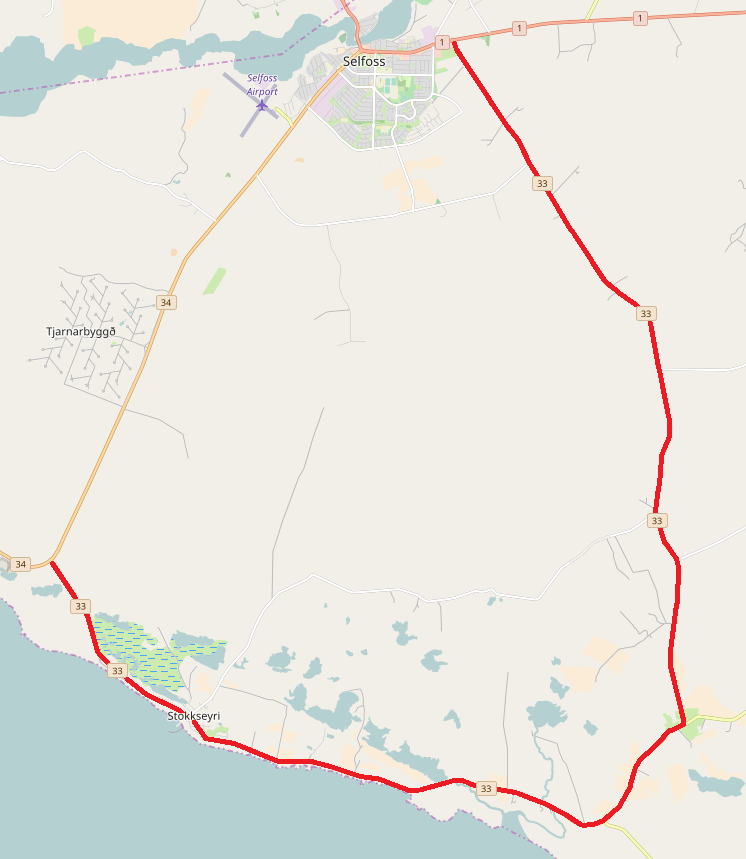

Route information
- Length: 26 km (16 mi)

Major junctions
- Southern end: Route 34 Eyrarbakkavegur
- Route 314 Holtsvegur; Route 305 Villingaholtsvegur; Route 308 Hamarsvegur; Route 312 Vorsabæjarvegur í Flóa; Route 311 Önundarholtsvegur; Route 310 Votmúlavegur
- Northern end: Route 1

Location
- Country: Iceland

Highway system
- Roads in Iceland

Gaulverjabæjarvegur (Icelandic pronunciation: [ˈkœylˌvɛrjaˌpaiːjarˌvɛːɣʏr̥], lit. 'Gaulverjabær Road') or Route 33 is a national road in the Southern Region of Iceland. It runs from Route 1 east of Selfoss to the intersection of Eyrarbakkavegur. It runs through the village of Stokkseyri.
