= Suðurlandsbraut =

Suðurlandsbraut can mean either of the following:

- Suðurlandsbraut (street) - a street in Reykjavík, formerly a part of the eastern exit from the city.
- Suðurlandsbraut (road) - a part of Route 1 along the southern part of Iceland.
