= Route 25 (Iceland) =

Road in Iceland

Route 25
- Þykkvabæjarvegur
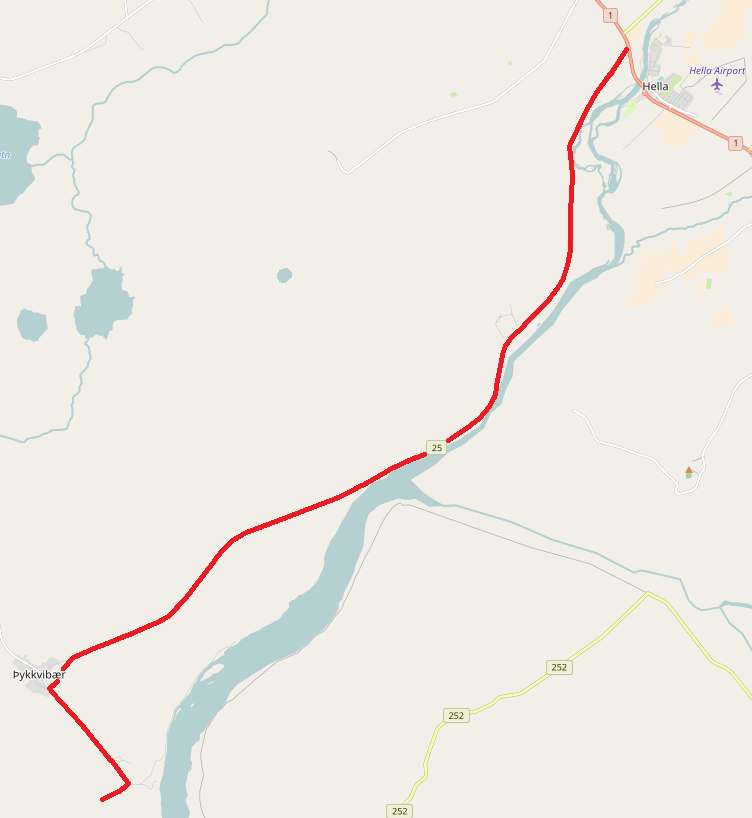

Route information
- Length: 18.5 km (11.5 mi)

Major junctions
- Northern end: Route 1 Hella

Location
- Country: Iceland

Highway system
- Roads in Iceland

Þykkvabæjarvegur (Icelandic pronunciation: [ˈθɪhkvaˌpaiːjarˌvɛːɣʏr̥], lit. 'Þykkvibær Road') or Route 25 is a national road in the Southern Region of Iceland. It runs from Route 1 near Hella, crosses through Þykkvibær and ends at Suður Nýibær.
