= Route 417 (Iceland) =

Road in Iceland

Route 417

Route information
- Length: 8.38 km (5.21 mi)

Major junctions
- From: Route 1 near Sandskeið
- To: Route 42 at Hafnarfjörður

Location
- Country: Iceland

Highway system
- Roads in Iceland

Bláfjallavegur (Icelandic pronunciation: [ˈplauːˌfjatlaˌvɛːɣʏr̥], "Bláfjöll Road"), designated as Route 417, is a national road located in the Capital Region of Iceland. It runs from Route 1 near Sandskeið, through the nature preserve of Bláfjallafólkvangur [ˈplauːˌfjatlaˌfoul̥kˌvauŋkʏr̥] up to Route 42 at Hafnarfjörður.
