= Route 47 (Iceland) =

Road in Iceland

Route 47
- Hvalfjarðarvegur
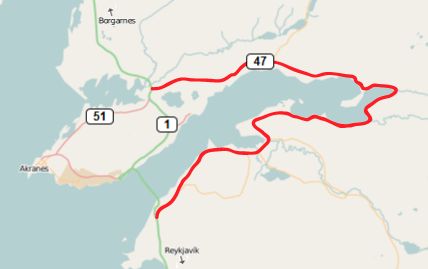
- Hvalfjarðarvegur marked in red

Route information
- Length: 61 km (38 mi)

Location
- Country: Iceland

Highway system
- Roads in Iceland

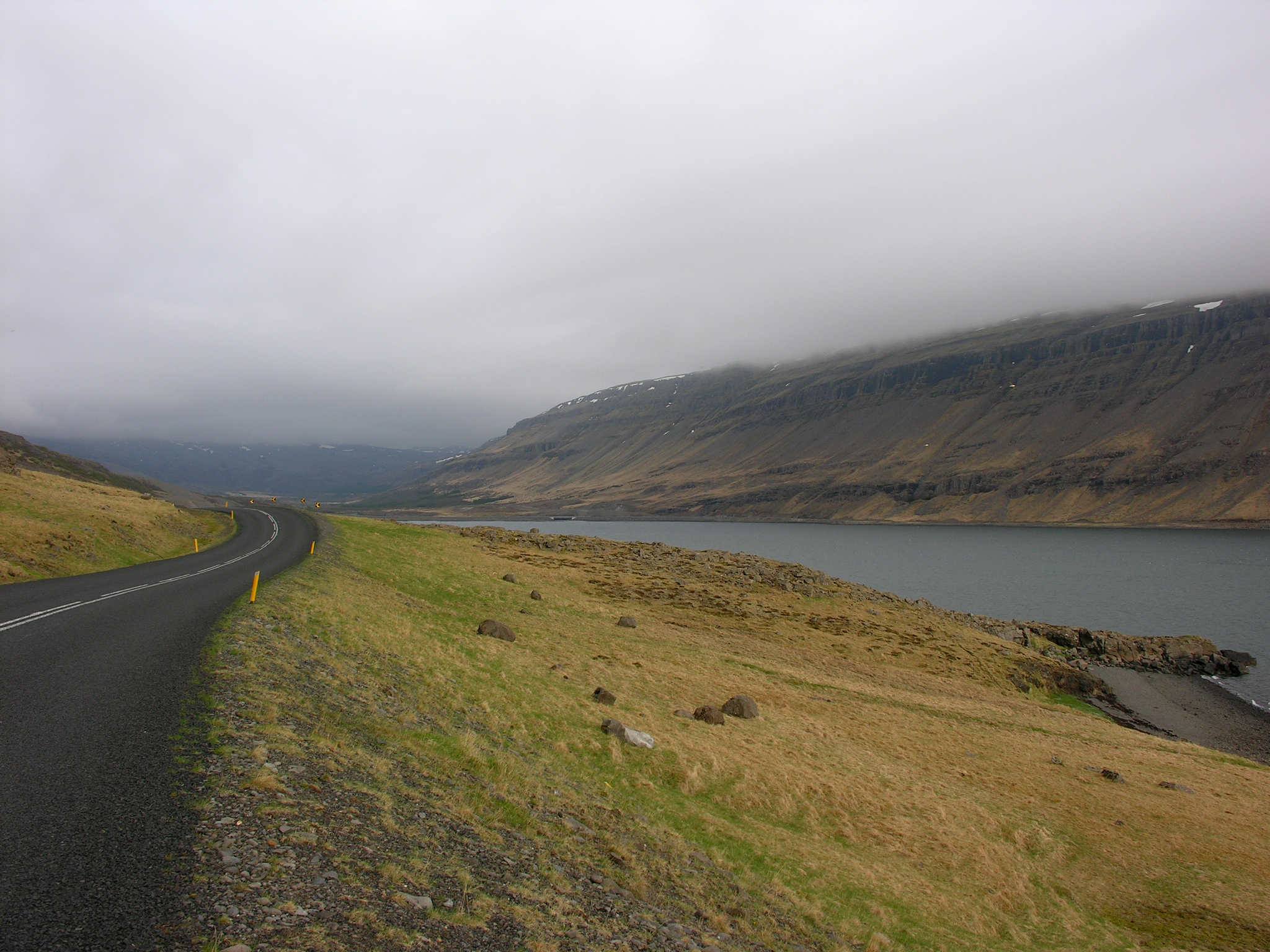
Road 47 near the bay Botnsvogur

Hvalfjarðarvegur (Icelandic pronunciation: [ˈkʰvalˌfjarðarˌvɛːɣʏr̥], lit. 'Hvalfjörður Road') or Route 47 is a road in Iceland rounding the Hvalfjörður fjord. It was formerly part of Iceland's Route 1 (Ring Road) until it was bypassed by the Hvalfjörður Tunnel opened in 1998. The road is 61 km long.

When this stretch of road was part of Route 1, it was very treacherous due to heavy traffic and difficult situations. It was not completely paved until 1990. About two years before Hvalfjörður Tunnel opened, new bridges were constructed along the route to replace dangerous single-lane bridges over the Botnsá and Brunná rivers.

There were originally three general stores along the route. A shop at the bridge over Botnsá river was closed by the time a proper road was built. There was also a hut at Miðsand, and a third was near the Ferstikla farm, near the intersection with Dragavegur (Route 520). Business declined with decline in traffic.

Today traffic is generally low, however there is significant recreational traffic on nice summer days. There has been considerable development in tourism in Hvalfjarðarsveit in recent years, and a growing number of residents in Kjósin. The road is also used as an alternative for the Hvalfjörður Tunnel, and traffic increases significantly while the tunnel is closed.

The route number 47 was previously used for a short road section in Reykjanes that formed the approach to Keflavík Airport from the intersection of Reykjanesbraut (Route 41) and Garðskagavegur (Route 45). This was when Route 41 designation was used for the road to Sandgerði. The road to Sandgerði was subsequently renumbered as Route 429 and the airport approach road ceased using Route 47 and assumed the Route 41 designation.

64°23′34″N 21°47′57″W
