= Vegaskarð =

Mountain pass in Iceland

Coordinates: 65.442°N 15.944°W

Vegaskarð (Icelandic pronunciation: [ˈvɛːɣaˌskarθ], "Road Pass") is a mountain pass in Norður-Múlasýsla county, Iceland, between Víðidalur valley, and Möðrudalur and Möðrudalsöræfi wilderness. The Ring Road runs through the pass roughly midway between Akureyri and Egilsstaðir.

Just east of the pass, the old unpaved portion of the Ring Road continues to the mountain settlement of Möðrudalur, while the newer paved road winds north to Langidalur valley on its way to Háreksstaðaleið. Beneath the west slopes of the pass runs Skarðsá river.

South of the pass is the cone-shaped reddish mountain peak Vegahnjúkur (783 m); north of the pass stands Sauðahnjúkur peak (641 m). Gunnuklettur, a myth-surrounded rock in the middle of the pass opening into a tiny cave shelter, is believed to be the death place of a woman named Gunna, after whom the rock is named.
