= Route F88 (Iceland) =

Road in Iceland

Coordinates: 65.353°N 16.065°W

Route F88
- Öskjuleið

Route information
- Length: 80 km (50 mi)

Major junctions
- Northern end: Route 1 Ring Road
- Southern end: Route 910

Location
- Country: Iceland

Highway system
- Roads in Iceland

Öskjuleið (Icelandic pronunciation: [ˈœscʏˌleiːθ], lit. 'Askja Way'), or Route 88, is a road in north-east Iceland. The road heads south from Route 1, a ring road, close to the volcanic crater Hrossaborg [ˈr̥ɔssaˌpɔrk], to Route 910, not far from Askja.

The road is the primary route to the tourist hotspots of Herðubreið and Hrossaborg.

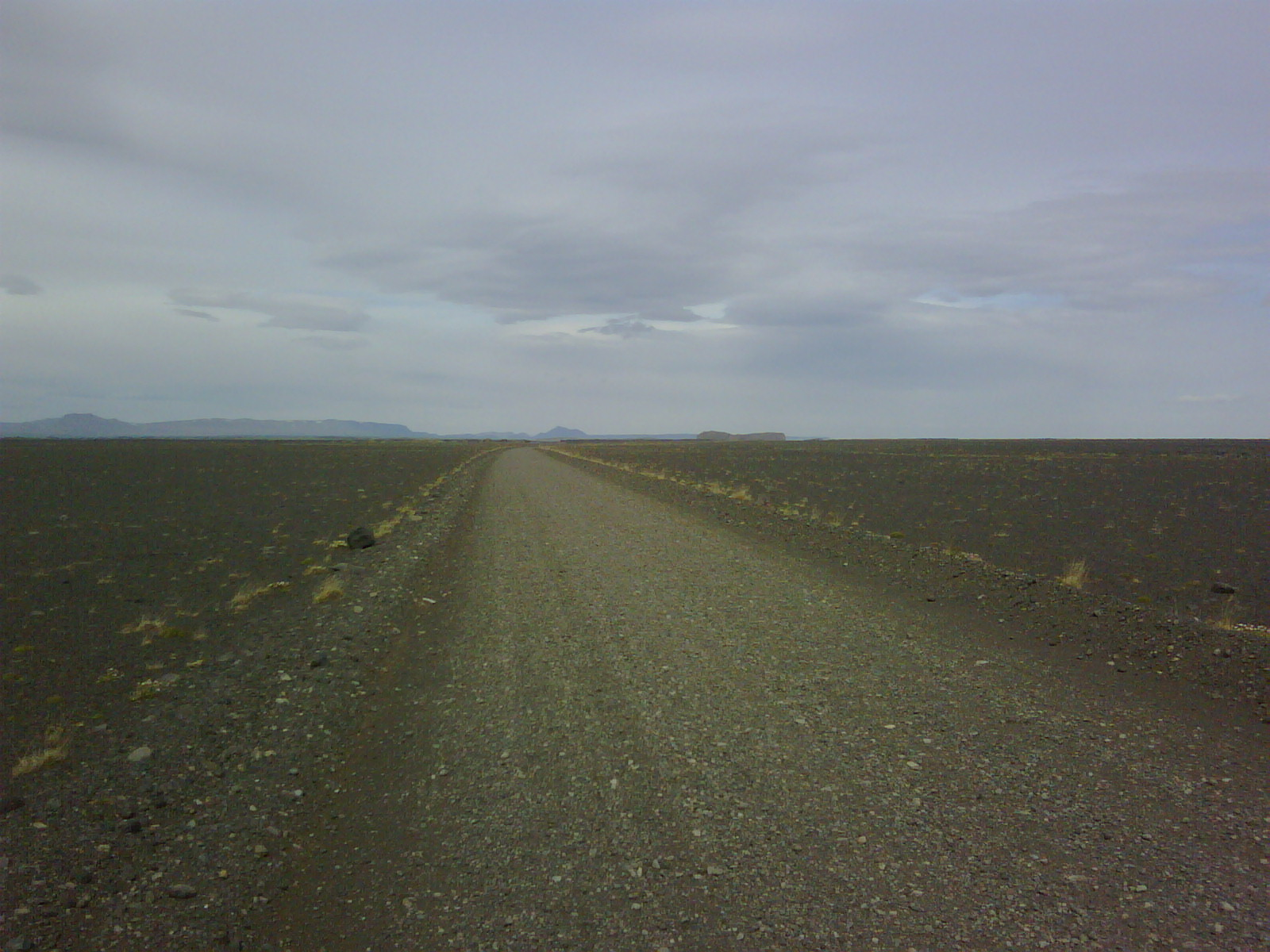
Straight of F88

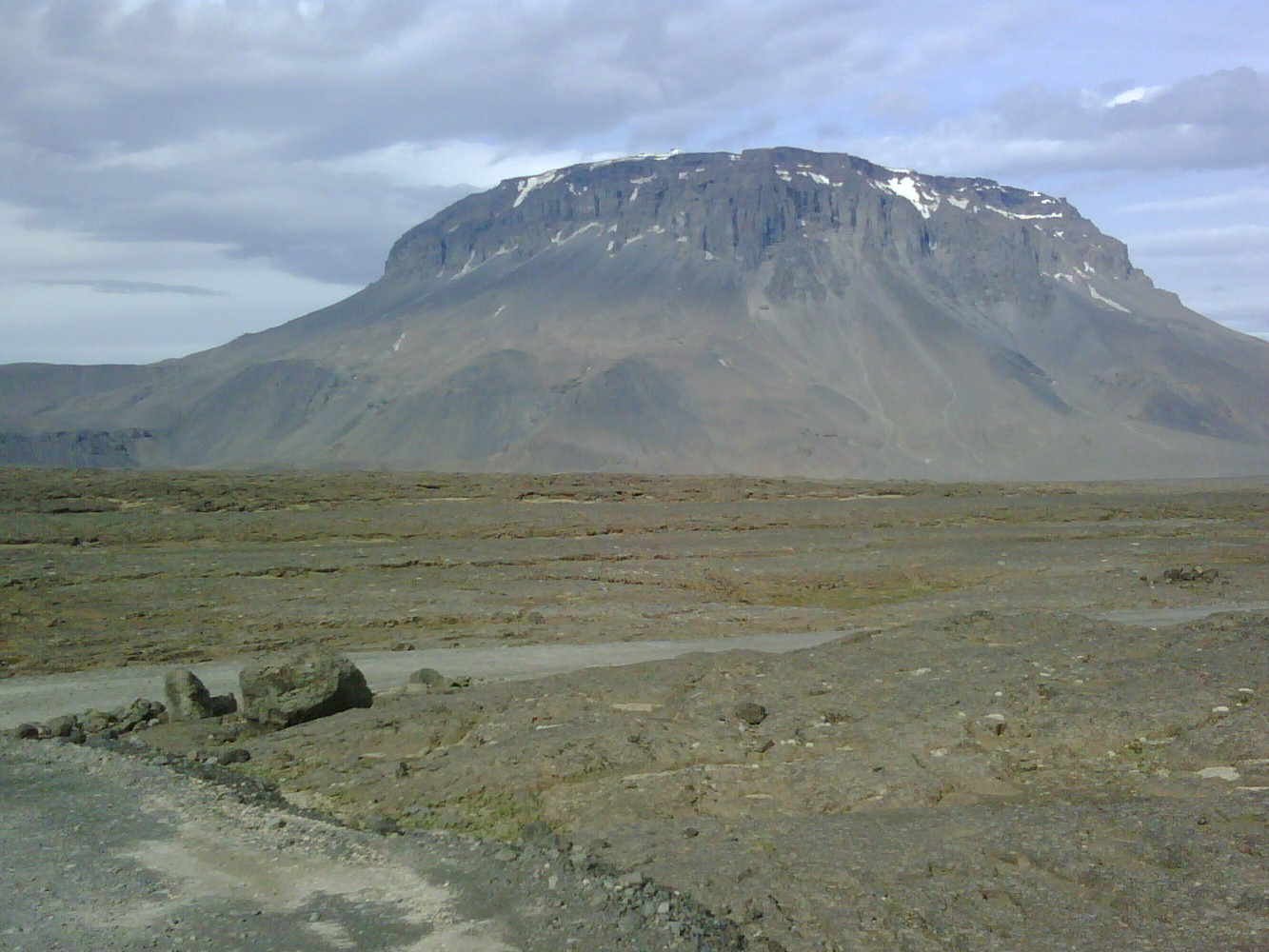
F88 close to Herðubreið

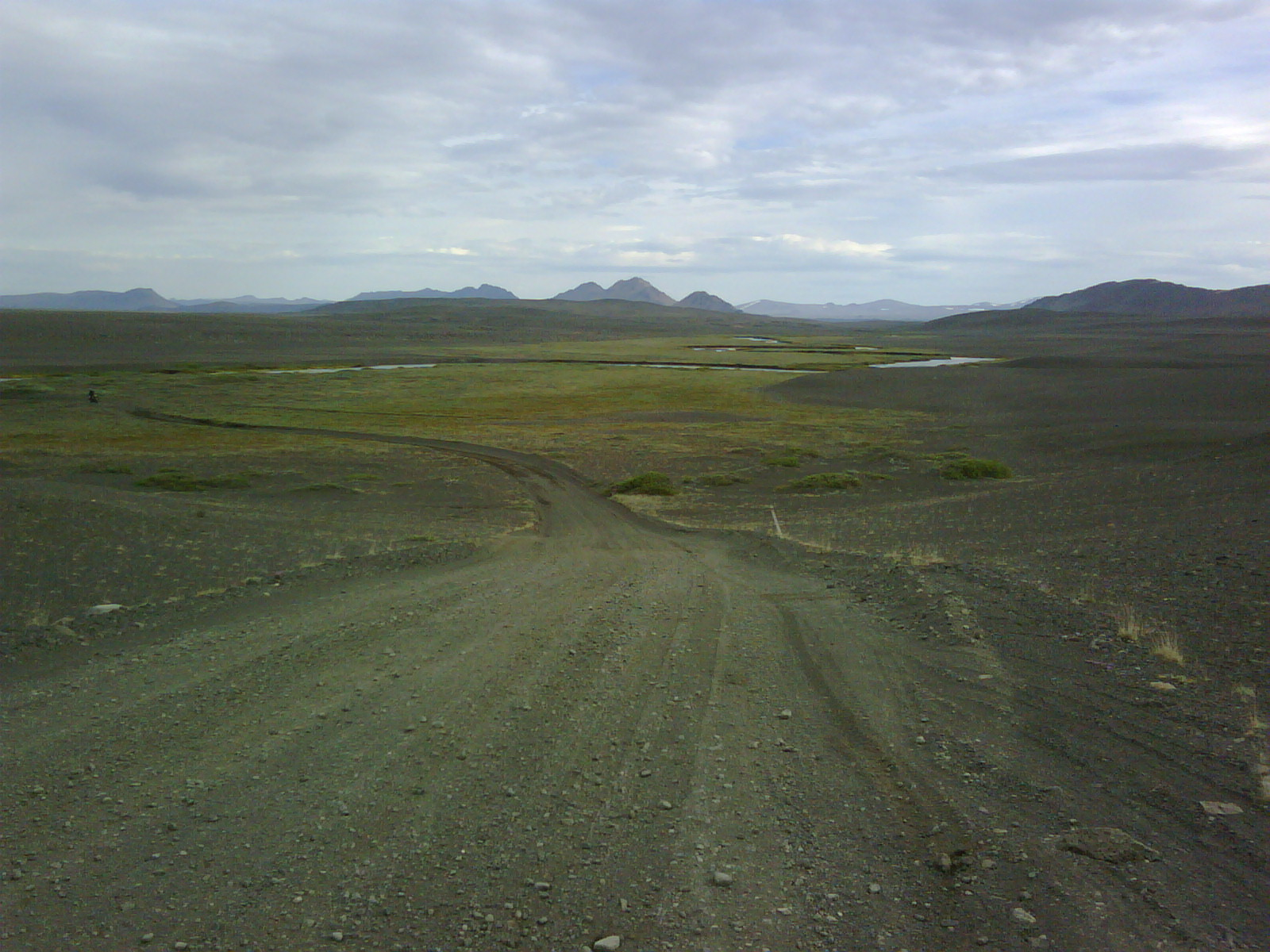
Route F88

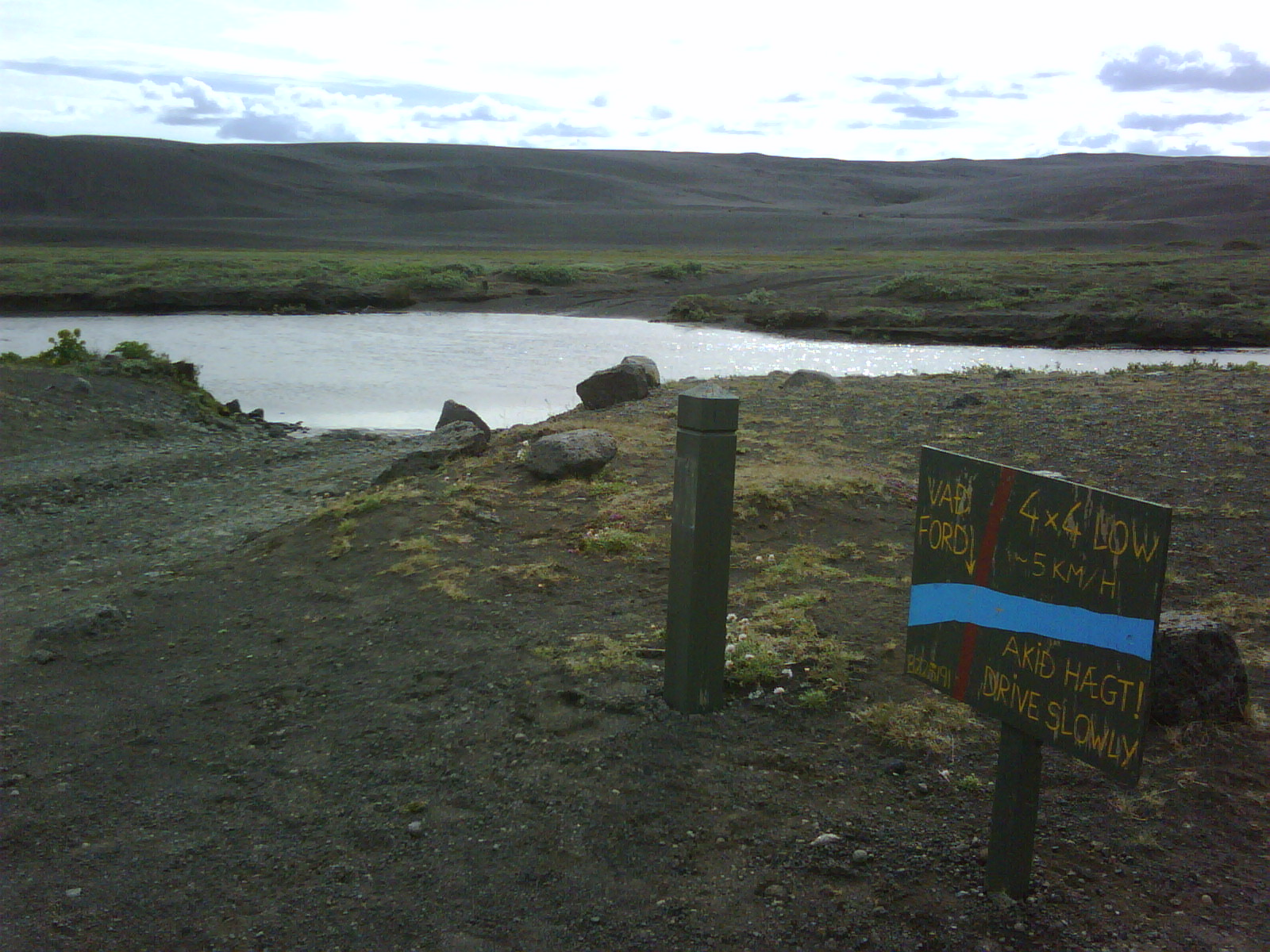
Ford crossing on F88

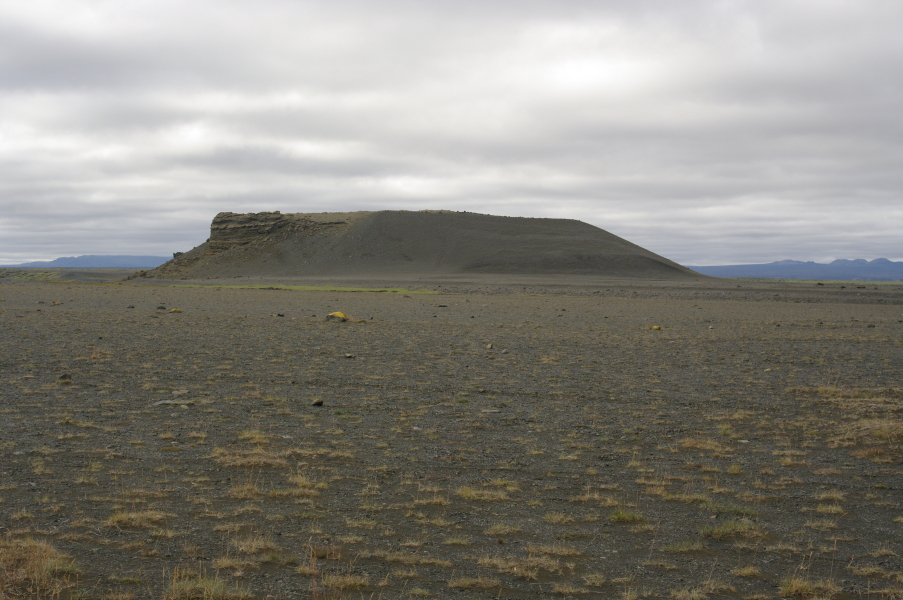
Hrossaborg

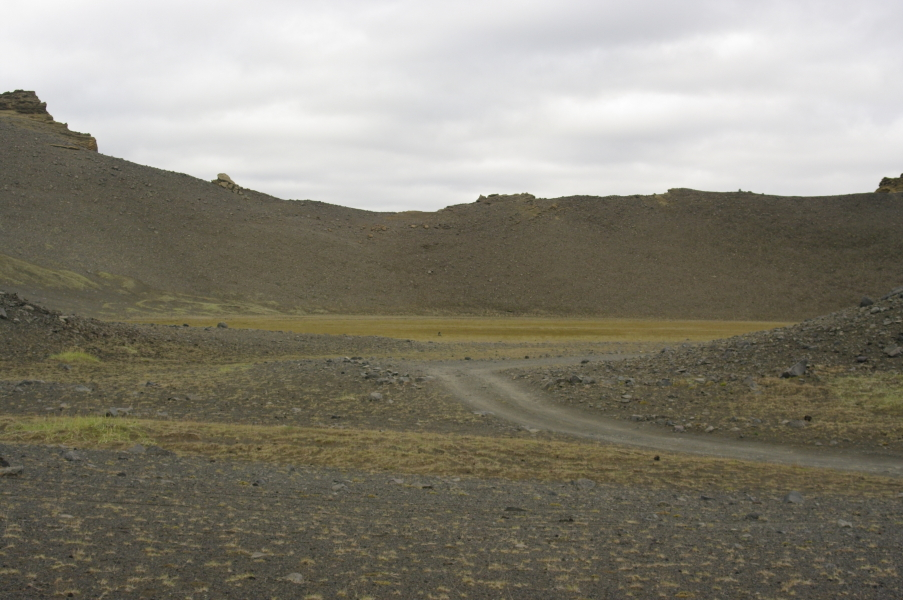
Hrossaborg crater

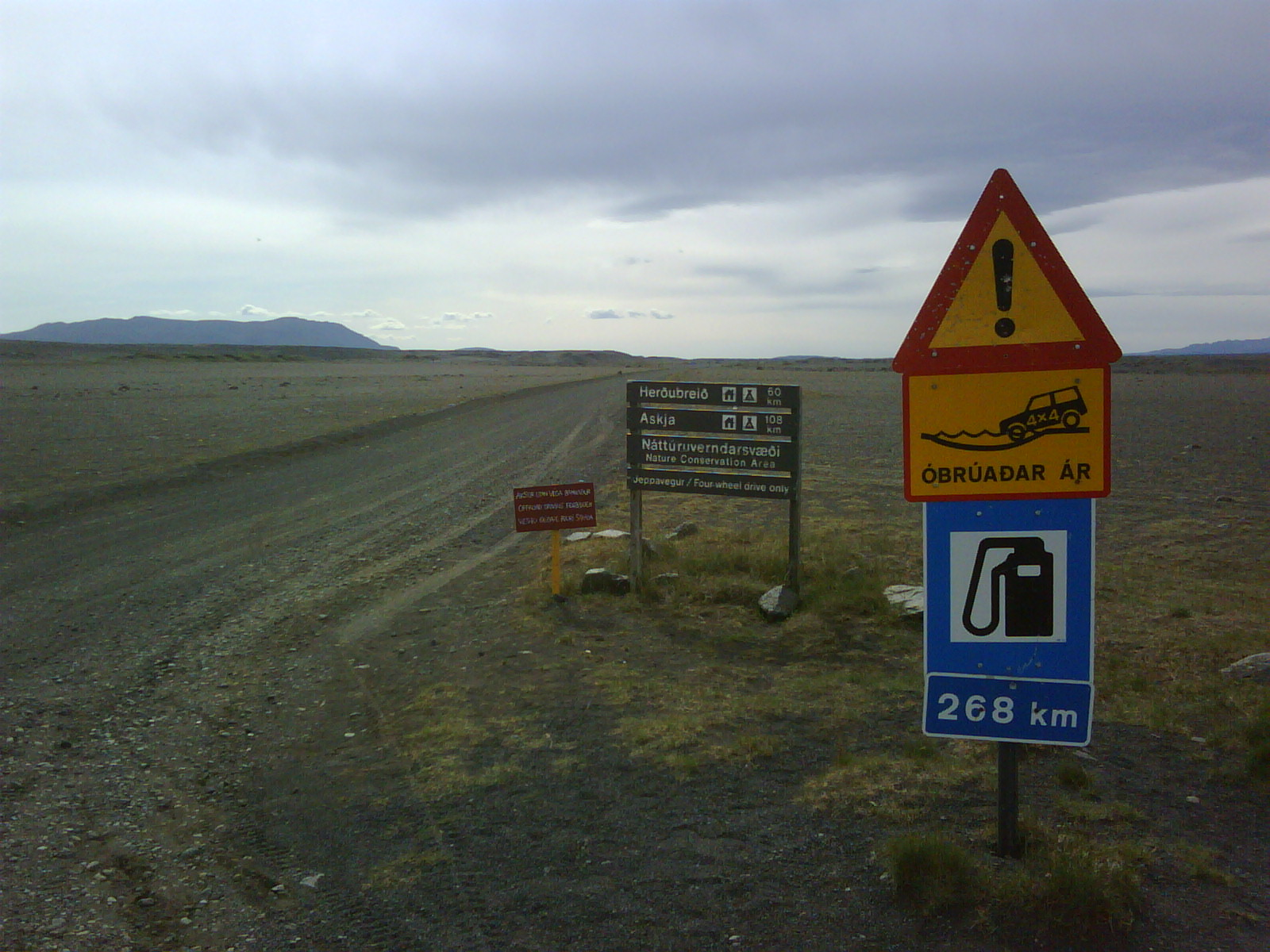
Intersection between F88 and Hringvegur
