= Route 22 (Iceland) =

Road in Iceland

Route 22
- Dalavegur
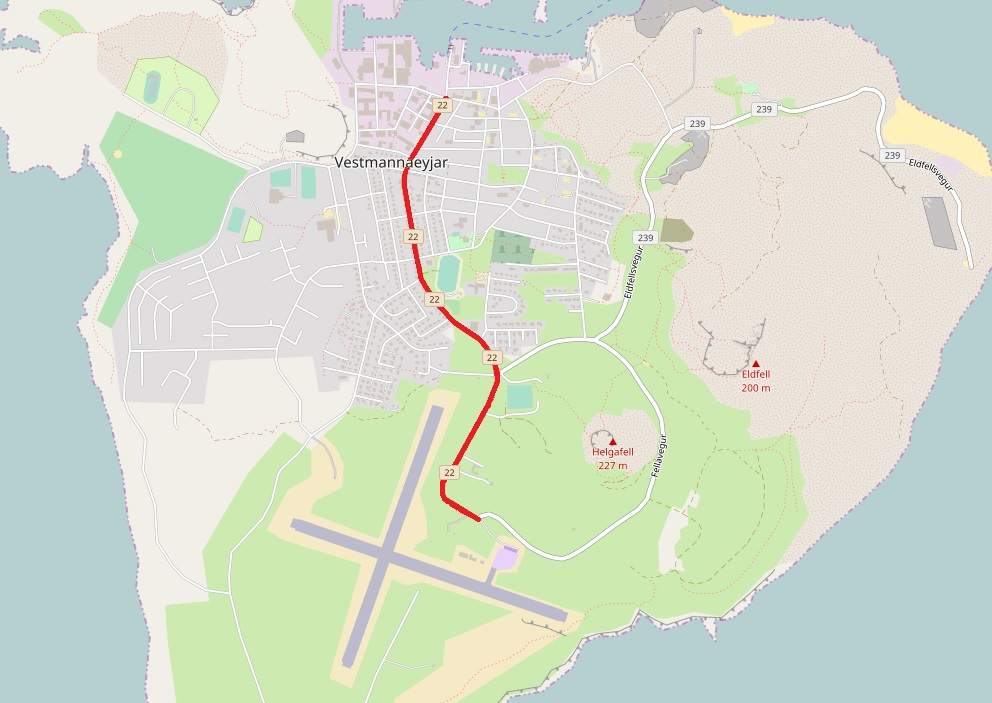

Route information
- Length: 2.42 km (1.50 mi)

Location
- Country: Iceland

Highway system
- Roads in Iceland

Dalavegur (Icelandic pronunciation: [ˈtaːlaˌvɛːɣʏr̥], lit. 'Valley Road') or Route 22 is a short national road on the island of Heimaey in the Southern Region of Iceland. It runs from Básaskersbryggja, through the town of Vestmannaeyjar up to Vestmannaeyjar Airport.
