= Street names in Iceland =

Street names in Iceland typically consist of two elements. The first element is chosen in alphabetical order and conforming to the neighbourhood's theme (usually nature-related), and the second element is shared by all the streets in a neighbourhood. The ending is also usually used to denote the neighbourhood; for example, a neighbourhood whose streets all end in –salir (hall) is called Salahverfi (neighbourhood of the halls).

Some older neighbourhoods do not follow the alphabetical order for streets. Exceptions do exist but the general rule is as above.

== Common endings ==
In alphabetical order:

- -ás (ridge)
- -bakki (river bank)
- -barð (embankment)
- -baugur (ring)
- -berg (rock)
- -borg (town, butte)
- -borgir (towns, buttes)
- -braut (runway)
- -brekka (escarpment)
- -brún (embankment)
- -bryggja (pier)
- -búð (smallholding)
- -byggð (settlement)
- -bær (farm, town)
- -endi (end)
- -fell (mount)
- -flöt (grassland)
- -garðar (gardens)
- -garður (garden)
- -gata (street)
- -geisli (ray)
- -gerði (hedge)
- -gil (canyon)
- -grandi (isthmus)
- -grund (ground)
- -hagi (pasture)
- -háls (ridge)
- -heiði (heath)
- -heimar (worlds)
- -hjalli (terrace)
- -hlíð (hillside)
- -holt (hill, older meaning: forest)
- -hólar (hillocks)
- -hólmi (islet)
- -hraun (lava)
- -hús (houses)
- -hvammur (grassy dell)
- -hvarf (varve)
- -hylur (pool)
- -hæð (mount)
- -höfði (cape)
- -kinn (mountain slope)
- -klöpp (rock)
- -kór (quire)
- -kvísl (river fork)
- -land (land)
- -leiti (hill)
- -lind (spring)
- -lundur (grove)
- -melur (gravel bed)
- -móar (moorland)
- -múli (cape)
- -mýri (marsh)
- -nes (promontory)
- -rimi (ridge)
- -salir (hall)
- -sel (lodge)
- -síða (side)
- -slóð (path)
- -smári (clover)
- -skjól (shelter)
- -skógar (woods)
- -stekkur (grove)
- -stígur (trail)
- -stræti (street)
- -strönd (coast)
- -teigur (small grassland)
- -torg (square)
- -tröð (path)
- -tunga (tongue of land)
- -tún (grassland), such as Borgartún
- -vangur (open area)
- -vellir (fields)
- -vogur (cove)
- -vík (bay)
- -vör (landing)

== Example of neighbourhood naming ==
Salahverfi is a recent neighbourhood in Kópavogur. It has a main street, Salavegur (Halls Road), from which various culs-de-sac spread out, in an alphabetical order as follows:

- Ársalir (River Halls)
- Björtusalir (Brightness Halls)
- Blásalir (Blue Halls)
- Dynsalir (Thunder Halls)
- Fensalir (Marsh Halls; this is the name of the home of Frigg)
- Forsalir (Entry Halls)
- Glósalir (Glow Halls)
- Goðasalir (Halls of the Gods)
- Hásalir (Height Halls)
- Hlynsalir (Maple Halls)
- Jórsalir (Yor Halls, old name for Jerusalem)
- Jötunsalir (Jotun Halls)
- Logasalir (Flame Halls)
- Lómasalir (Loon Halls)
- Miðsalir (Middle Halls)
- Rjúpnasalir (Ptarmigan Halls)
- Roðasalir (Redness Halls)
- Skjólsalir (Shelter Halls)
- Sólarsalir (Halls of the Sun)
- Straumsalir (Current Halls)
- Suðursalir (South Halls)

== See also ==
- List of roads in Iceland
