= Route 92 (Iceland) =

Road in Iceland

Coordinates: 65°4′28″N 14°1′8″W

Route 92
- Norðfjarðarvegur
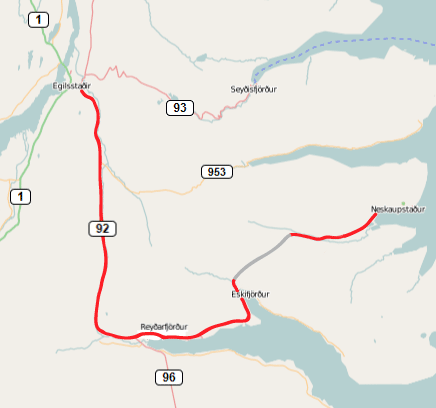
- Norðfjarðarvegur (before November 2017 change in road numbering) marked in red, with Norðfjarðargöng tunnel in grey.

Major junctions
- Northern end: Route 93 Egilsstaðir
- Eastern end: Neskaupstaður

Location
- Country: Iceland

Highway system
- Roads in Iceland

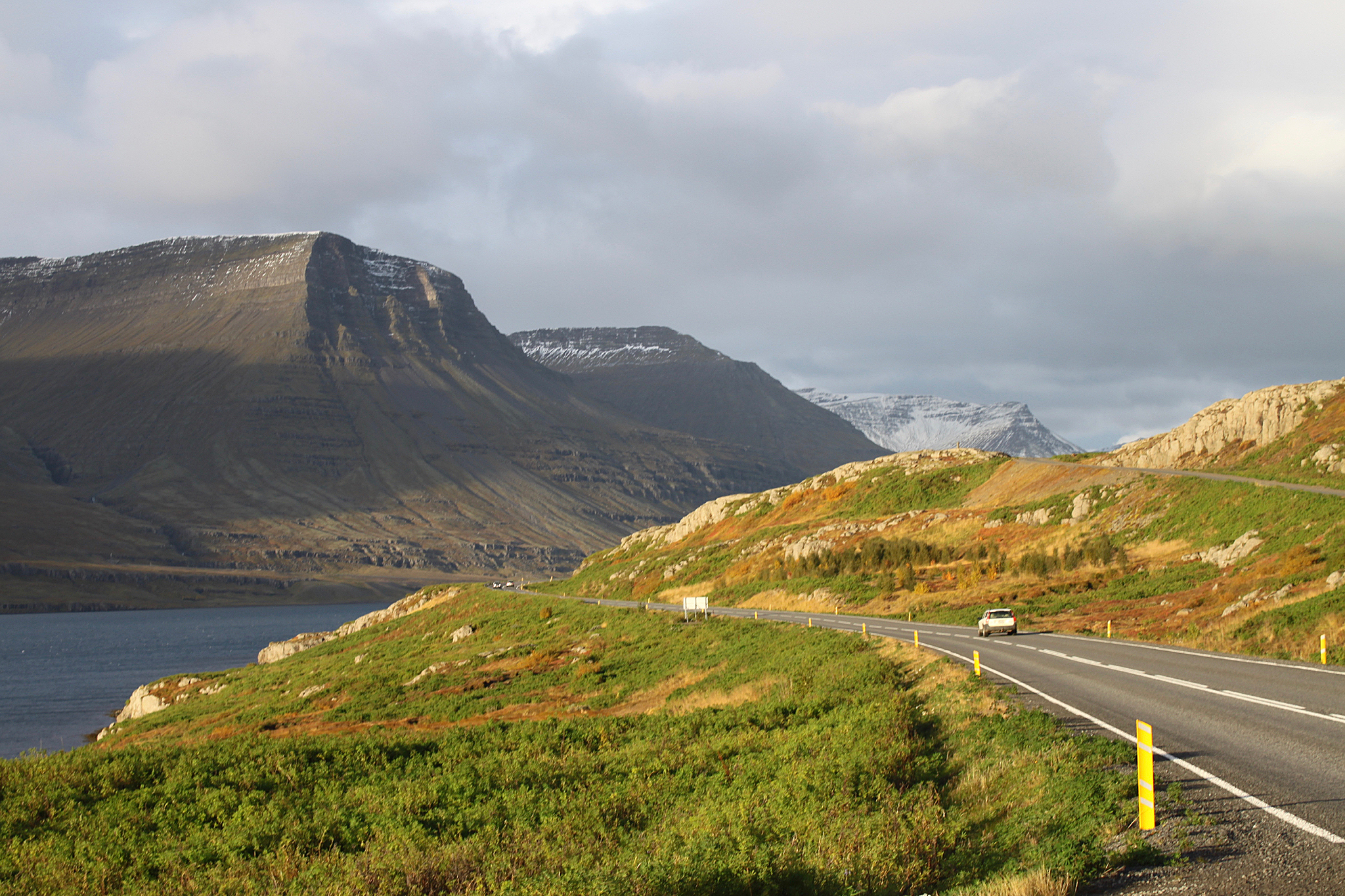
Route 92 (Iceland), the fjord Reyðarfjörður in the background

Route 92 or Norðfjarðarvegur (Icelandic pronunciation: [ˈnɔrðˌfjarðarˌvɛːɣʏr̥], lit. 'Northfjord Road') is a national road in the Eastern Region of Iceland. It connects the towns of Reyðarfjörður, Eskifjörður, and Neskaupstaður (all of them are in the municipality of Fjarðabyggð) and includes the tunnel Norðfjarðargöng which opened to traffic on 11 November 2017. Until the opening of Norðfjarðargöng, the road used the shorter tunnel Oddsskarðsgöng which was located at a higher elevation at the Oddsskarð pass and was often closed in winter.

Also until 11 November 2017, Route 92 continued from Reyðarfjörður to Egilsstaðir. That part of the road is now numbered as part of the Ring Road (Route 1), together with former Route 96.
