= Route 96 (Iceland) =

Road in Iceland

Route 96
- Suðurfjarðavegur
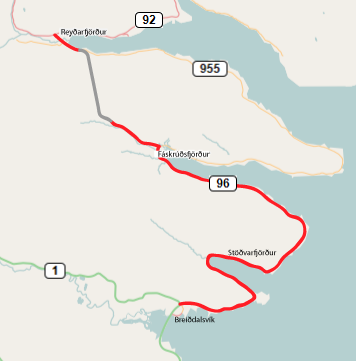
- Suðurfjarðavegur marked in red, with a tunnel in grey

Major junctions
- Northern end: Route 92 Norðfjarðarvegur
- Southern end: Route 1 Hringvegur

Location
- Country: Iceland

Highway system
- Roads in Iceland

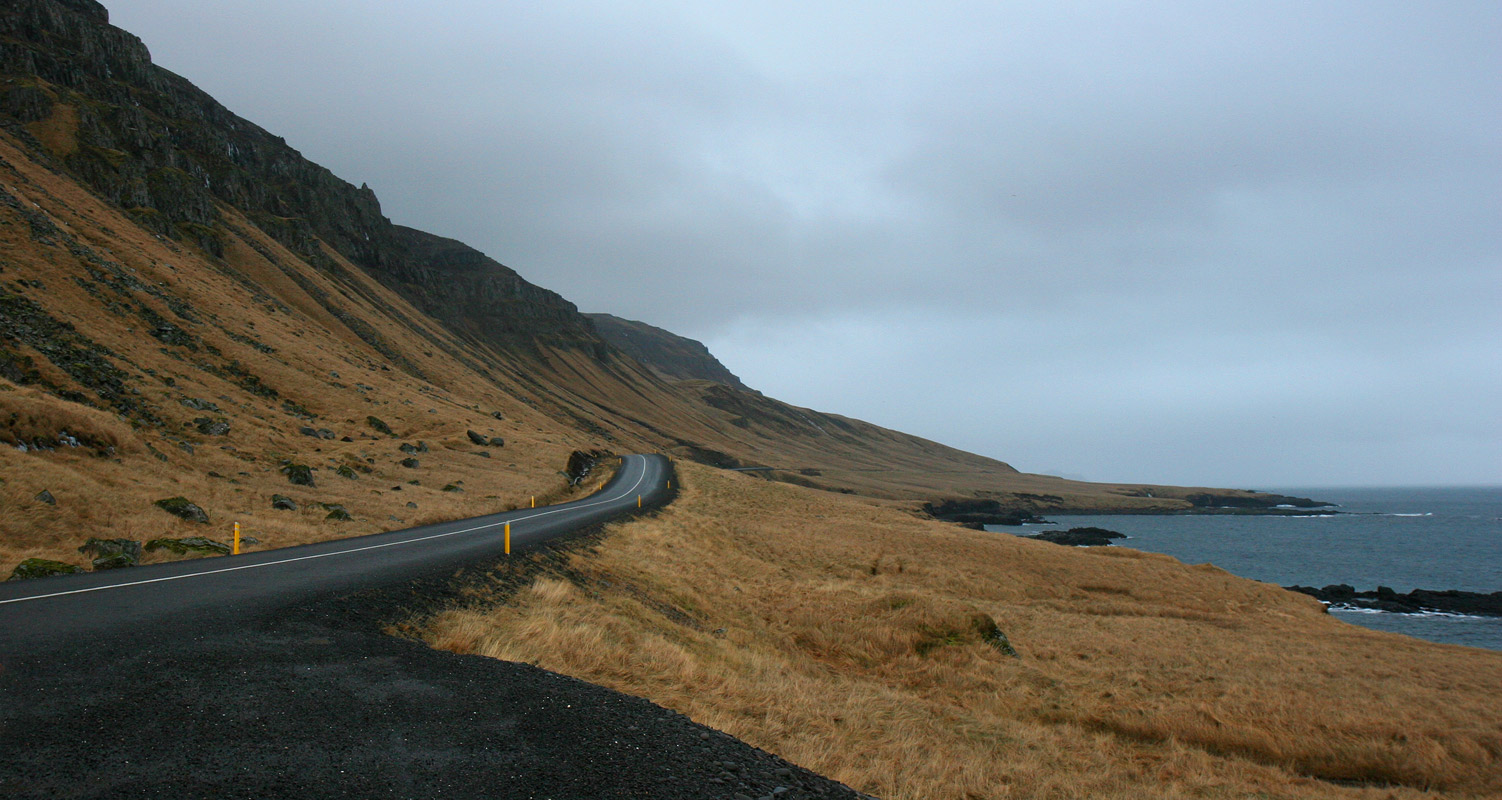
Between Fáskrúðsfjörður and Stoðvarfjörður

Route 96 or Suðurfjarðavegur (Icelandic pronunciation: [ˈsʏːðʏrˌfjarðaˌvɛːɣʏr̥], lit. 'Southfjord Road') was a national road in the Eastern Region of Iceland. It begins just west of Reyðarfjörður and heads through the Fáskrúðsfjörður road tunnel. It then follows the coast to Stöðvarfjörður and ends just outside Breiðdalsvík. In November 2017, the entire road became part of the Ring Road (Route 1), together with a part of Route 92, replacing the route over Breiðdalsheiði which in turn was re-numbered from Route 1 to a new road number, Route 95.
