= Fáskrúðsfjarðargöng =

Road tunnel in Iceland

Coordinates: 64°59′16″N 14°11′29″W

Fáskrúðsfjörður Tunnel
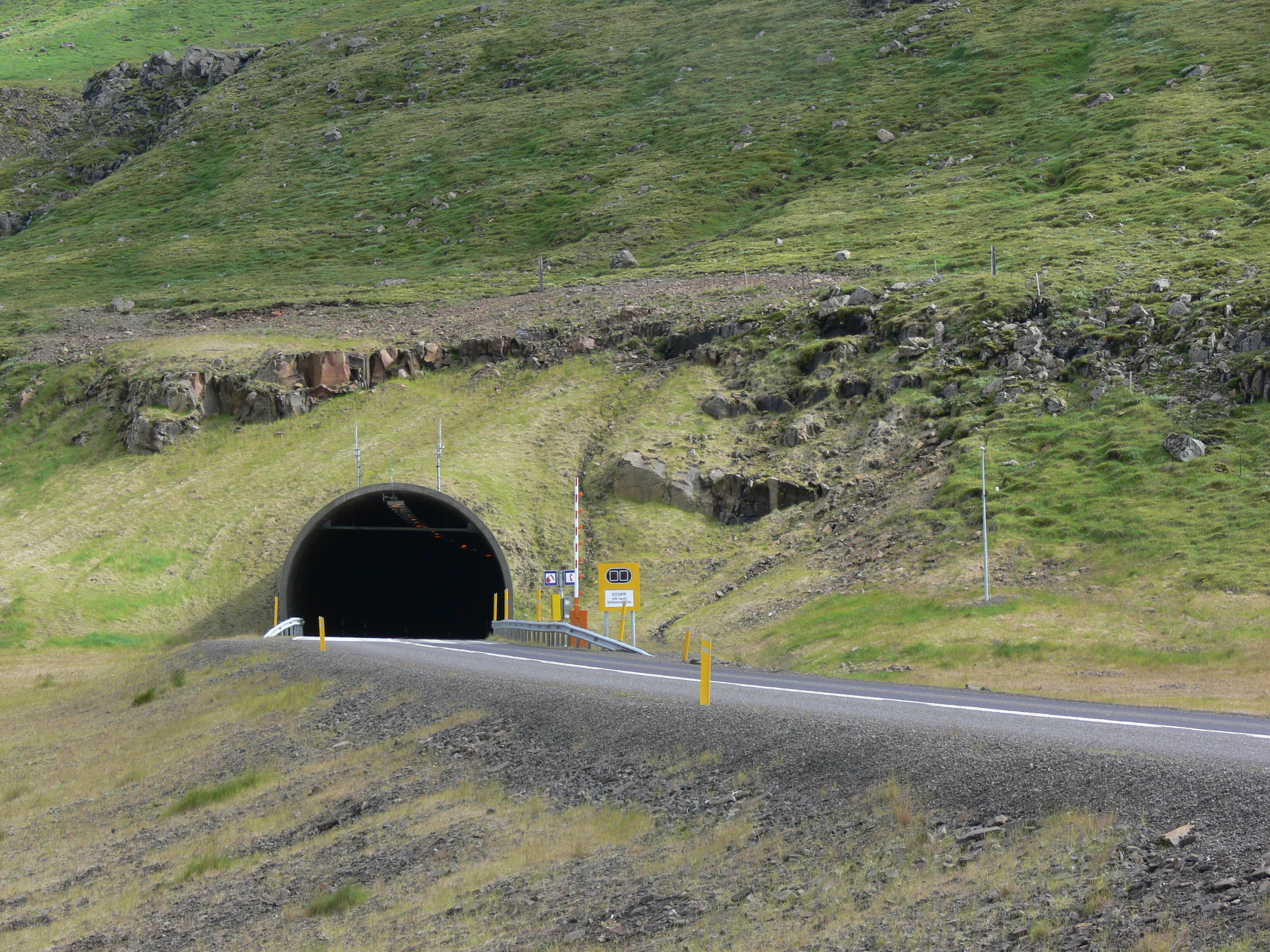
- Interactive map of Fáskrúðsfjörður Tunnel

Overview
- Location: Fjarðabyggð, Iceland
- Route: 1

Operation
- Work began: 2003
- Opened: 2005
- Operator: Vegagerðin
- Traffic: Automotive
- Vehicles per day: 500

Technical
- Length: 5.9 km (3.7 mi)
- No. of lanes: 2

Fáskrúðsfjarðargöng (Icelandic pronunciation: [ˈfauːˌskruðsˌfjarðarˌkœyŋk], lit. 'Fáskrúðsfjörður Tunnel') is a tunnel in Iceland, located in Eastern Region along Route 1 (formerly along Route 96). It has a length of 5,850 m (19,193 ft) and opened on September 9, 2005.
