= Arnavatnsheiði =

Arnarvatnsheiði (Icelandic pronunciation: [ˈa(r)tnarˌvasːˌheiːðɪ]) is a plateau in the west of Iceland. It belongs to the Highlands of Iceland.

It is situated to the north-east of the valley Reykholsdalur and the town Húsafell and to the north of the glacier Langjökull.

The region is very well known for the multitude of lakes with fishing in the summer. On the other hand, climate is rather rough like in the rest of the Highlands of Iceland.

To the southwest of Arnarvatnsheiði, there are the lava caves Surtshellir. In former times, outlaws used to live there. It was then common in Iceland to exclude people from society when they had committed crimes.
