= Route 1 (Iceland) =

Ring road circumnavigating Iceland

Route 1
- Þjóðvegur 1
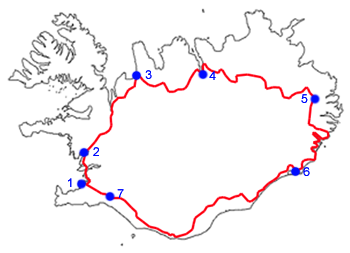
- The Ring Road of Iceland (as of 2004) and some towns it connects: (1) Reykjavík; (2) Borgarnes; (3) Blönduós; (4) Akureyri; (5) Egilsstaðir; (6) Höfn; (7) Selfoss

Route information
- Maintained by Icelandic Road Administration (Vegagerðin)
- Length: 1,309 km (813 mi)
- Existed: 1974–present

Location
- Country: Iceland

Highway system
- Roads in Iceland

Route 1 or the Ring Road (Icelandic: Þjóðvegur 1 or Hringvegur pronounced [ˈr̥iŋkˌvɛːɣʏr̥]) is a national road in Iceland that circles the entire country. The total length is 1,309 kilometres (813 mi), making it the longest ring road in Europe.

As a major trunk route, Road 1 is considered to be the most important piece of transport infrastructure in Iceland,.as it connects the majority of towns together in the most densely populated areas of the country. It carries a large proportion of goods traffic as well as tourist traffic.

The road was completed in 1974, coinciding with the 1,100th anniversary of the country's settlement when the longest bridge in Iceland, crossing the Skeiðará river in the southeast, was opened. Previously, vehicles intending to travel between southern settlements, e.g. Vík to Höfn, had to travel north of the country through Akureyri, making the opening a major transport improvement to the country.

Many popular tourist attractions in Iceland, such as the Seljalandsfoss and Skógafoss waterfalls, Dyrhólaey cliffs, Jökulsárlón glacier lagoon, as well as Mývatn lake, Dettifoss and Goðafoss waterfalls in the north are easily accessible from the Ring Road. The road passes through almost all areas of the country (everywhere apart from the Westfjords), making it a popular itinerary to take for tourists and vacationing locals alike in Iceland.

== Characteristics ==
The Ring Road is paved for all of its length and is mostly two lanes wide: one lane going in each direction. The Icelandic Road Administration, Vegagerðin, oversees the maintenance and operation of the Ring Road. The road is generally of good quality, recent road improvement projects have improved safety considerably. However the road still has hazards, going over many higher-altitude mountain passes in all parts of the country, which can have steep gradients and sharp curves, as well as blind curves and summits and single-lane bridges, especially in the more rural east of the country. Driving in winter one must take special precautions and pre-check driving conditions with the Icelandic Road Administration to ensure the road is passable.

The speed limit is 90 kilometres per hour (56 mph) on open sections; 70 kilometres per hour (43 mph) in tunnels and 50 kilometres per hour (31 mph) through urban areas. A few speed cameras operate on sections just outside of Reykjavík and in all tunnels.

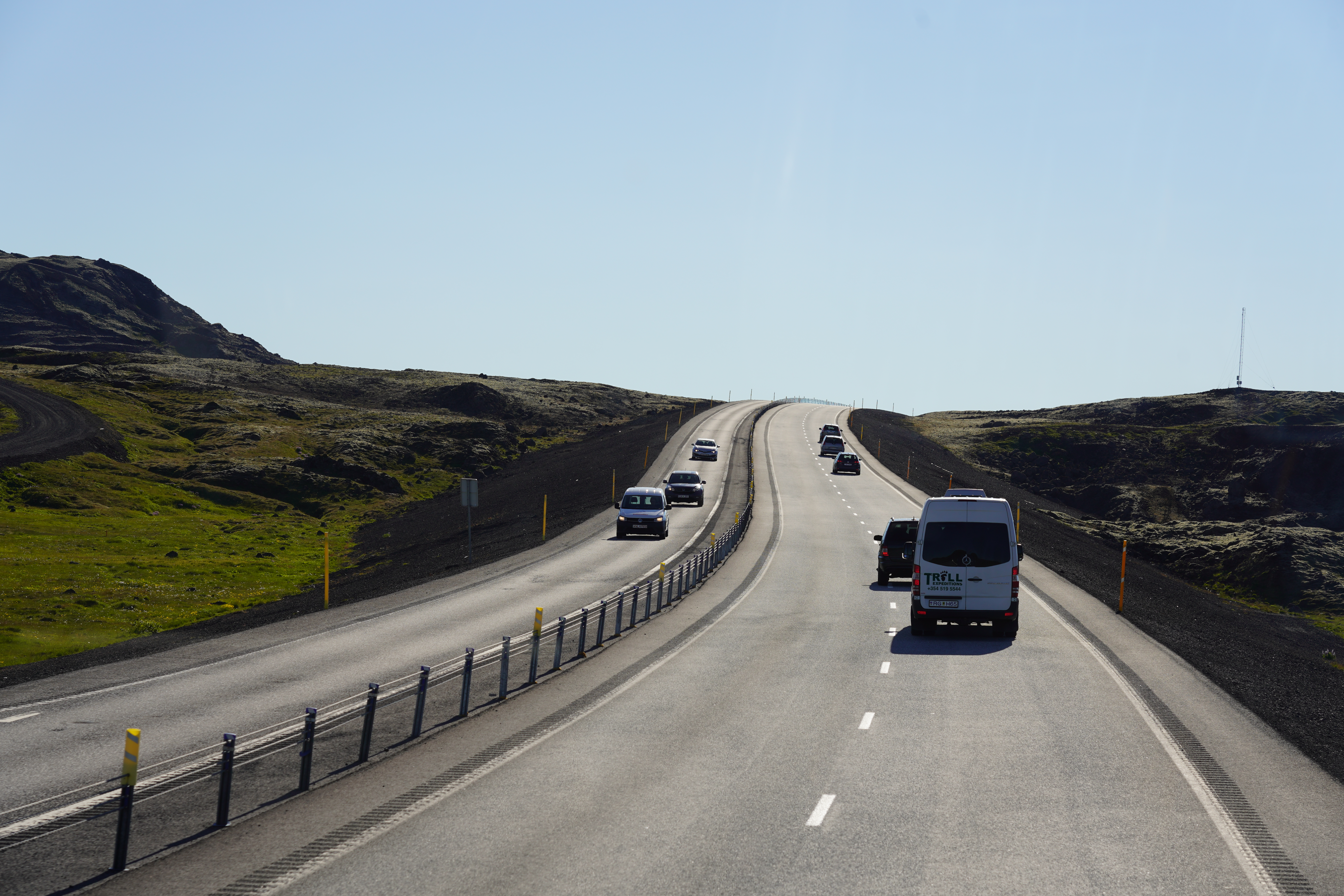
2+1 expressway at the Hellisheiði mountain pass, between Reykjavík and Hveragerði

In recent years, due to increased traffic and demands for higher road safety, many large improvements have been made in both capacity and safety of the ring road. In the southwestern corner of the country, between Kjalarnes and Selfoss and through Reykjavík, the road is usually divided by a barrier and has three or four lanes of traffic, mostly being a 2+1 lane partly-controlled access highway. At current traffic levels, 2+1 lane roads provide similar safety and traffic requirements to a regular expressway, and can be upgraded to a 4 lane road when traffic necessitates it.

The 7.4 km (4.6 mi) long Vaðlaheiðargöng tunnel near Akureyri in the north of the country shortened the route by 16 km (9.9 mi) and improved winter safety, bypassing a mountain road.

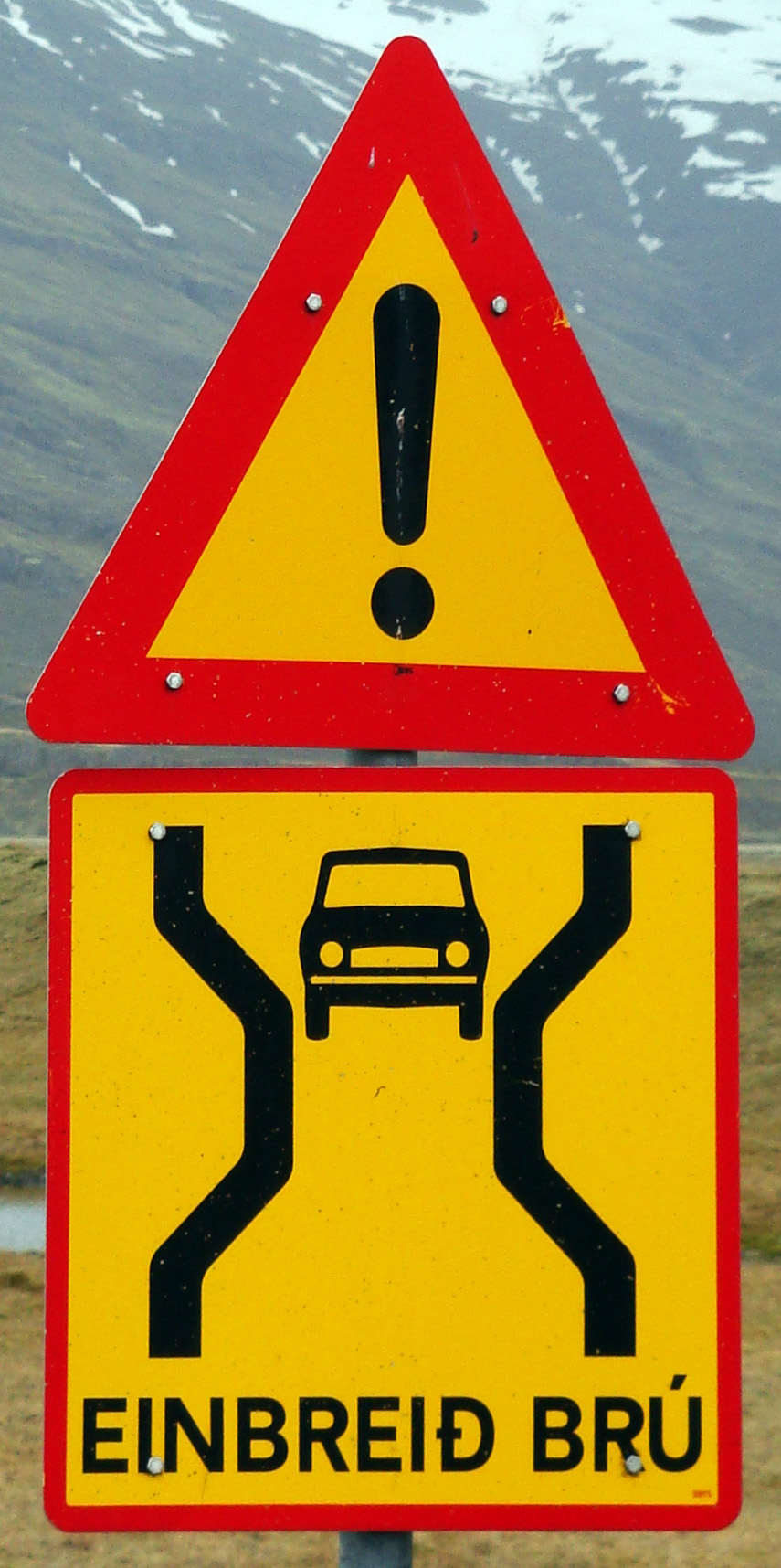
Road sign for a single-lane bridge in Iceland

=== Single-lane bridges ===
In more rural parts of the country, mostly in the glacial plains of the south and the Eastfjords, 26 single-lane bridges exist on the Ring Road. Dating back to the original construction of the road in the 1970s, they are sometimes constructed of wood or steel. Vehicles who approach the bridge first have the right of way. These are often narrow and long, making passing difficult, especially when there is high traffic. Since the 255-metre bridge over Hornafjarðarfljót was bypassed in June 2026, the longest remaining single-lane bridge on the Ring Road is the 247-metre bridge over Jökulsá í Lóni, built in 1952.

Non-locals, unaware of the rules of single-lane bridges, have ended in head-on and serious collisions using these bridges. Considered a major safety issue, the Icelandic Road Administration aims to rebuild/upgrade all bridges on the ring road to modern two lane standards by 2038. Single-lane bridges were reduced from around 60 in 2010 to 32 in 2020.

=== Driving in winter ===
Route 1 has the highest priority for snow removal from the Icelandic Road Administration and is serviced seven days a week during the winter, with teams keeping the road open as weather allows. Conditions are monitored 24/7 and relayed to the public through their website and telephone helpline. During extreme weather it may take hours until the weather calms down to open the road, or for maintenance teams to clear the road of snow after major snowfalls.

A few major mountain passes prone to closure in heavily trafficked parts of the ring road:

- Hellisheiði, between Reykjavík and Hveragerði
- Holtavörðuheði, between Borganes and Staðarskáli (on the Reykjavík to Akureyri route)
- Vatnsskarð, between Blönduós and Varmahlíð (on the Reykjavík to Akureyri route)
- Öxnadalsheiði, between Varmahlíð and Akureyri (on the Reykjavík to Akureyri route)
- Biskupsháls, between Akureyri and Egilsstaðir

Winter closures used to be more common in the past. In recent years, new tunnels such as the 7.4 km long Vaðlaheiðargöng near Akureyri in the north, have reduced the need to close the road due to snow. Prior to rerouting, the route between Breiðdalsvík and Egilsstaðir (over the Breiðdalsheiði plateau) in the east was often closed in winter. Route 1 was rerouted in November 2017, now using the somewhat sinuous coastal route via Reyðarfjörður, using (now former) Routes 96 and 92 to travel between the towns.

=== Natural hazards ===
Route 1 crosses a few glacial plains, such as Skeiðarársandur, which made the original road construction difficult in the 1970s. In addition, the Skeiðarársandur plain is subject to frequent glacial floods during or after eruptions on the nearby Grímsvötn volcano. Bridges and other stretches of road over the plains have had to be rebuilt as a result, notably during the eruption of Eyjafjallajökull in 2010, when the ring road was severed for several days in the south. These are not considered to a be a risk to everyday travellers as the roads are closed well in advance of a warning of a volcanic eruption.

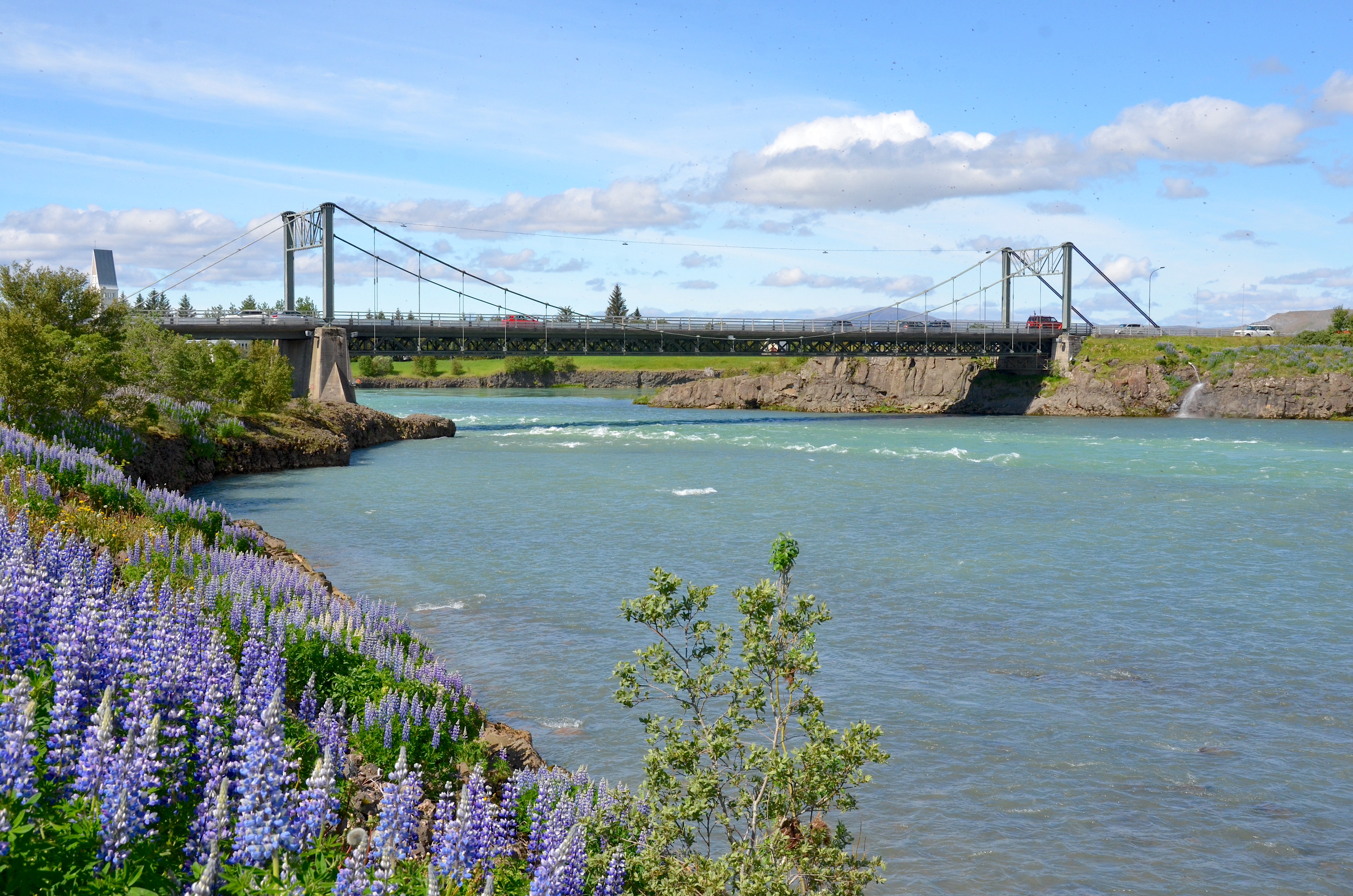
Ölfusárbrú in Selfoss, built in 1945, a major crossing on the southern part of Route 1.

=== Traffic ===
Since its completion, the ring road has seen constant growth in traffic, and has seen an even quicker growth during the recent rise in number of tourists arriving in Iceland. Average traffic recorded along the ring road rose from a consolidated count of 57,000 vehicles per day in 2005 to over 90,000 vehicles per day in 2019.

Route 1 is popular with tourists since it covers most of the country and many sights of interest are located near to the route. It has long been a popular route with Icelandic families going on summer vacation, but in recent years the route is becoming more popular with foreign tourists who either rent a car or bring their own on the ferry to Seyðisfjörður.

Traffic levels on the road vary considerably between locations: in and near Reykjavík around 20,000-50,000 vehicles use the road daily, rural sections serving routes between Reykjavik and Akureyri in the west and Reykjavík and Vík in the south see traffic volumes of around 2,000 to 5,000 vehicles per day. The stretches farthest away from larger towns, mostly in the sparsely inhabited east of the country see an average around 500 vehicles per day.

Traffic on the ring road is also subject to considerable variation between the winter and summer, with the traffic in summer often being double or more than during the winter. This is due to a lower flow of tourist and agricultural traffic, as well as the roads being less passable or even closed during the winter. Traffic can become considerably heavy on weekends during the summer, when locals flock to travel around the country for holidays, camping and summer house visits across the country.

Heavy summer traffic is especially a problem during the summer at the town of Selfoss, where a single two lane bridge, Ölfusárbrú, is routed through the town carries practically all of the traffic in the south of the country, a significant bottleneck. This is planned to be replaced by a new bypass road and new 4-lane bridge over the Ölfus river, currently under construction and projected to be complete by 2028.

=== Electric vehicle charging stations ===
The ring road has complete coverage of electric vehicle (EV) charging stations, with around 30 DC fast charging sites spaced approximately 50-80km apart. They are located in almost all towns along the route, as well as rest stops and other locations. Each site has anywhere from 2-16 charging posts and they are operated by various companies including N1, Orka Nattúrinnar and Tesla. Charging power at each site ranges from 50-250kW and are CCS Type 2 standard, with most also supporting the older CHAdeMO standard. The longest stretch between chargers is a 113km section in the northeast, from Mývatn to Skjöldólfsstadir - where there are no amenities (including gasoline). The ring road first became covered by EV charging stations in 2018, initially by Orka Nátturinnar. Additionally, there are many slower AC charging stations at hotels, tourist attractions and towns.

== Sections ==
The route goes by many names depending on its location. The following table shows road names (excluding tunnels) in a clockwise direction from Reykjavík.

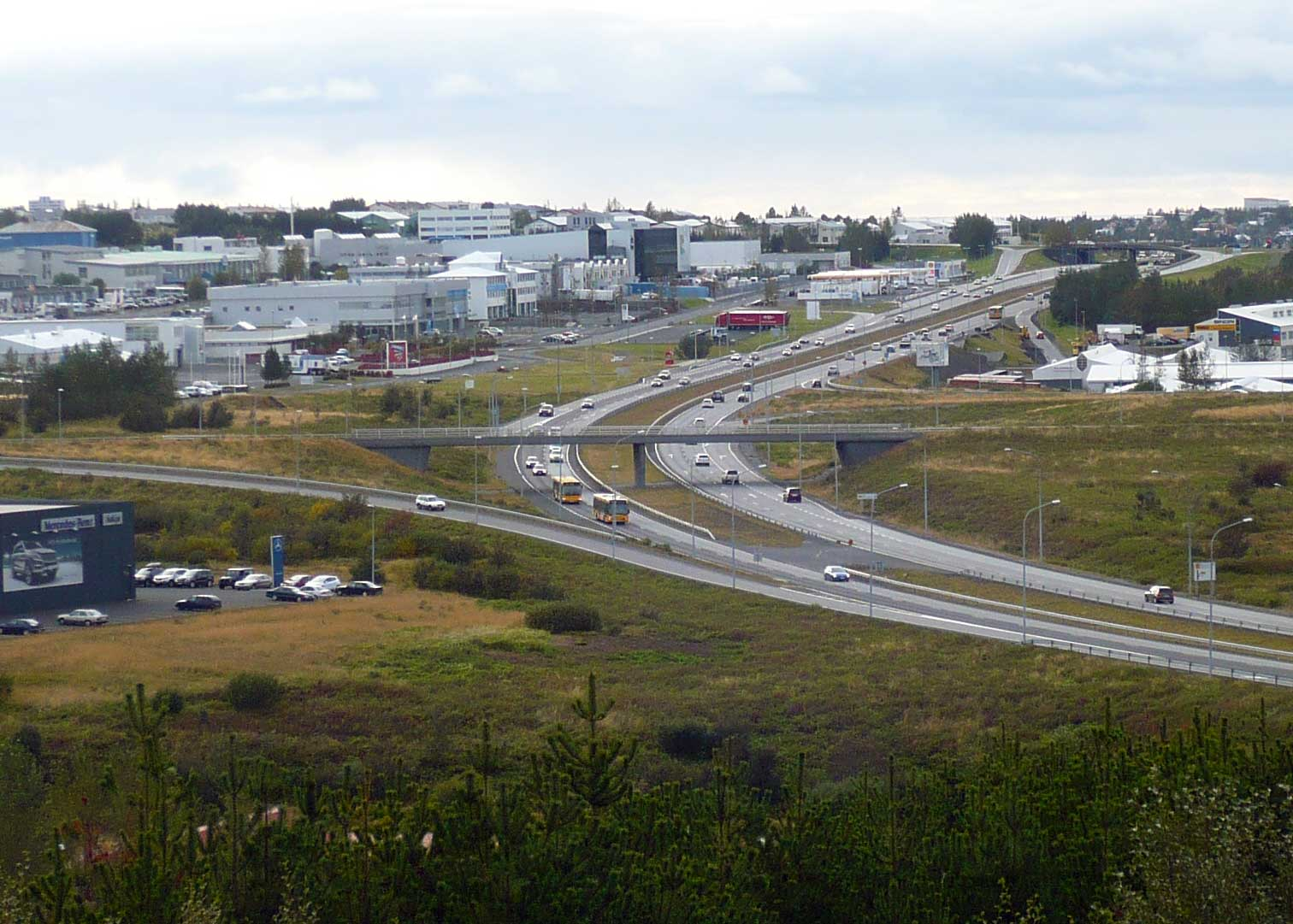
The intersection of Suðurlandsvegur (left) and Vesturlandvegur (lower right) in Reykjavík. The latter continues more than 2 km to the west (far side), before merging with route 49.

Name	Location
Vesturlandsvegur	Eastern Reykjavík to Borgarnes
Borgarbraut	Borgarnes
Hringvegur	Borgarnes to northern Akureyri
Hörgárbraut	Akureyri
Glerárgata	Akureyri
Drottningarbraut (partial)	Akureyri
Hringvegur	Southern Akureyri to the turning for Höfn
Suðurlandsvegur	Höfn to Hella
Suðurlandsbraut	From Hella to Selfoss
Austurvegur	Selfoss
Suðurlandsvegur	From Selfoss to eastern Reykjavík

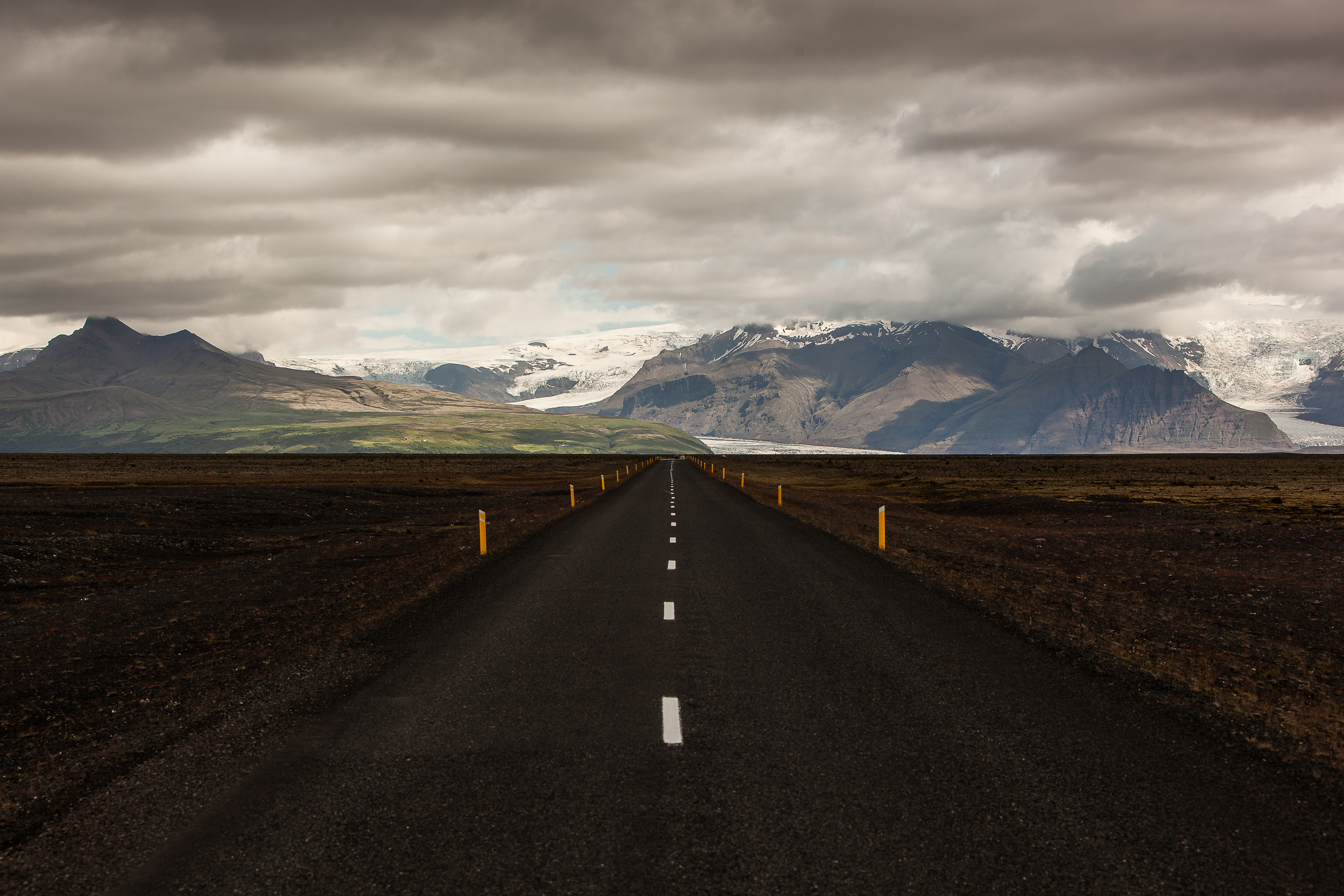
A stretch of Route 1 in southern Iceland

=== Tunnels on Route 1 ===
- Hvalfjörður Tunnel
- Almannaskarð Tunnel
- Fáskrúðsfjarðargöng
- Vaðlaheiði Tunnel

== List of cities and towns on Route 1 ==
Travelling clockwise (initially northward) from Reykjavík, the following communities and settlements are located on Route 1.

- Reykjavík
- Mosfellsbær
- Borgarnes
- Bifröst
- Blönduós
- Varmahlíð
- Akureyri
- Reykjahlíð
- Egilsstaðir
- Reyðarfjörður
- Eskifjörður
- Fáskrúðsfjörður
- Stöðvarfjörður
- Breiðdalsvík
- Djúpivogur
- Höfn
- Kirkjubæjarklaustur
- Vík
- Skógar
- Hvolsvöllur
- Hella
- Selfoss
- Hveragerði

== In popular culture ==
During the 2016 summer solstice, the Icelandic band Sigur Rós filmed and broadcast a live Slow TV event tour of Iceland driving along the entire route. The event was broadcast live in 360-degree video with a soundtrack of constantly evolving music based around elements of their track "Óveður".

== Gallery ==
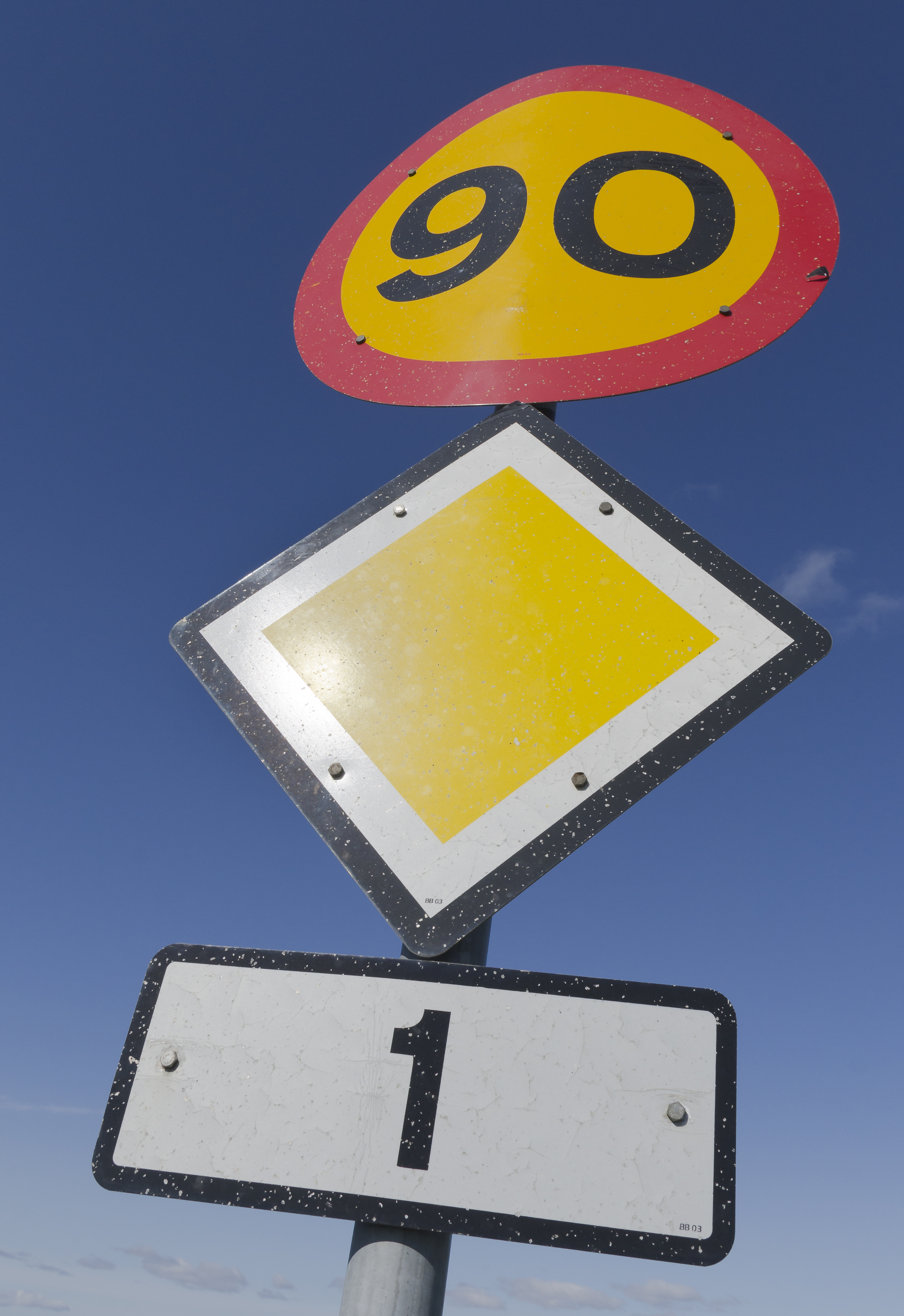
Road sign

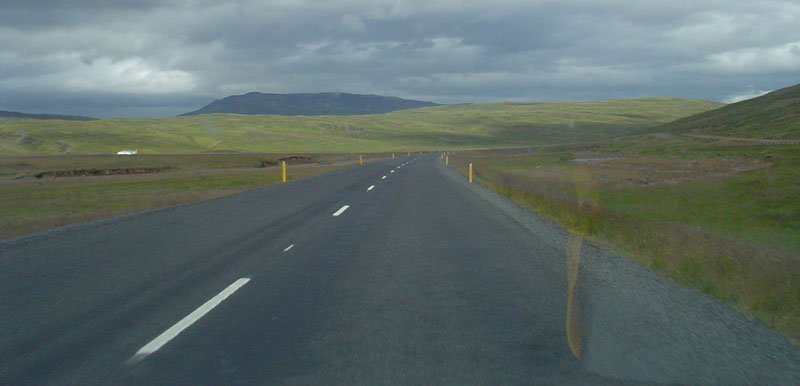
A typical stretch of Route 1, in Borgarfjörður

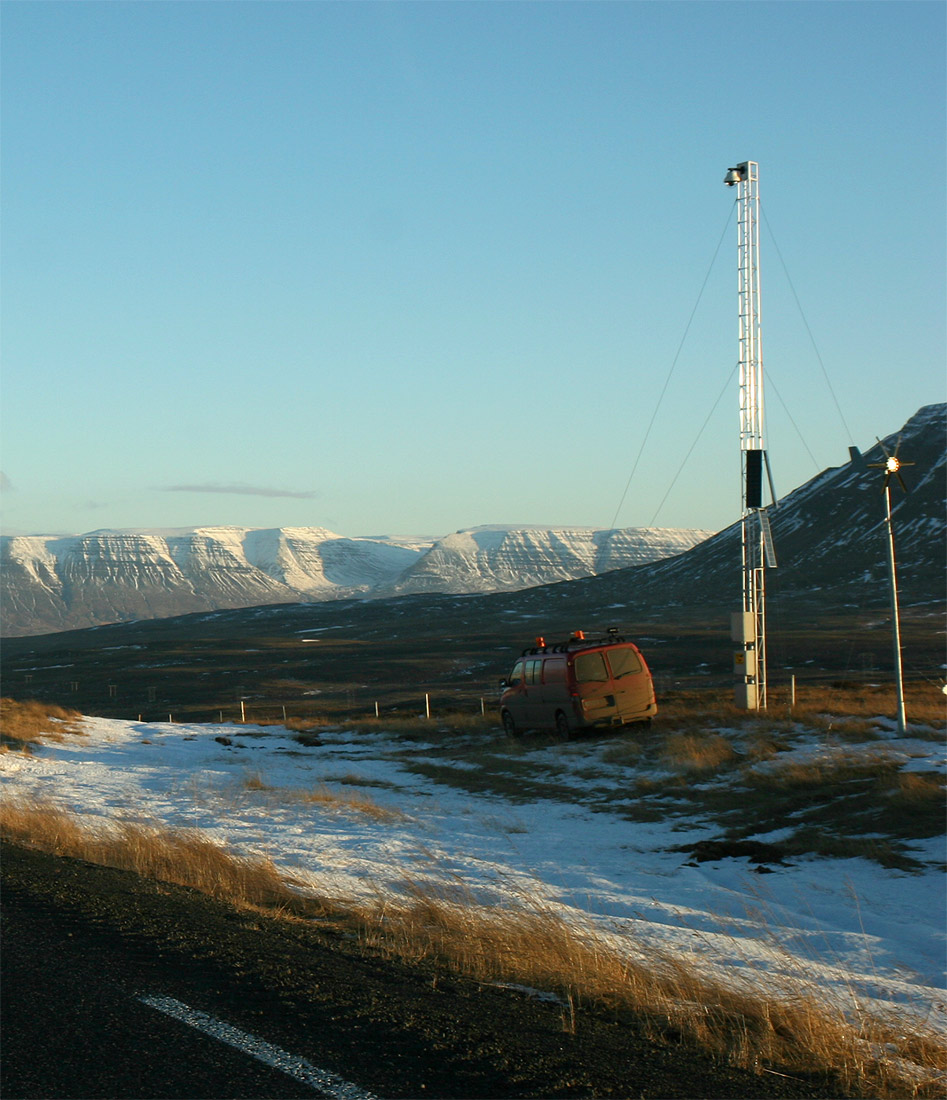
Road conditions are monitored in real time by a system of weather stations and webcams, such as this station at Vatnsskarð pass in north Iceland.

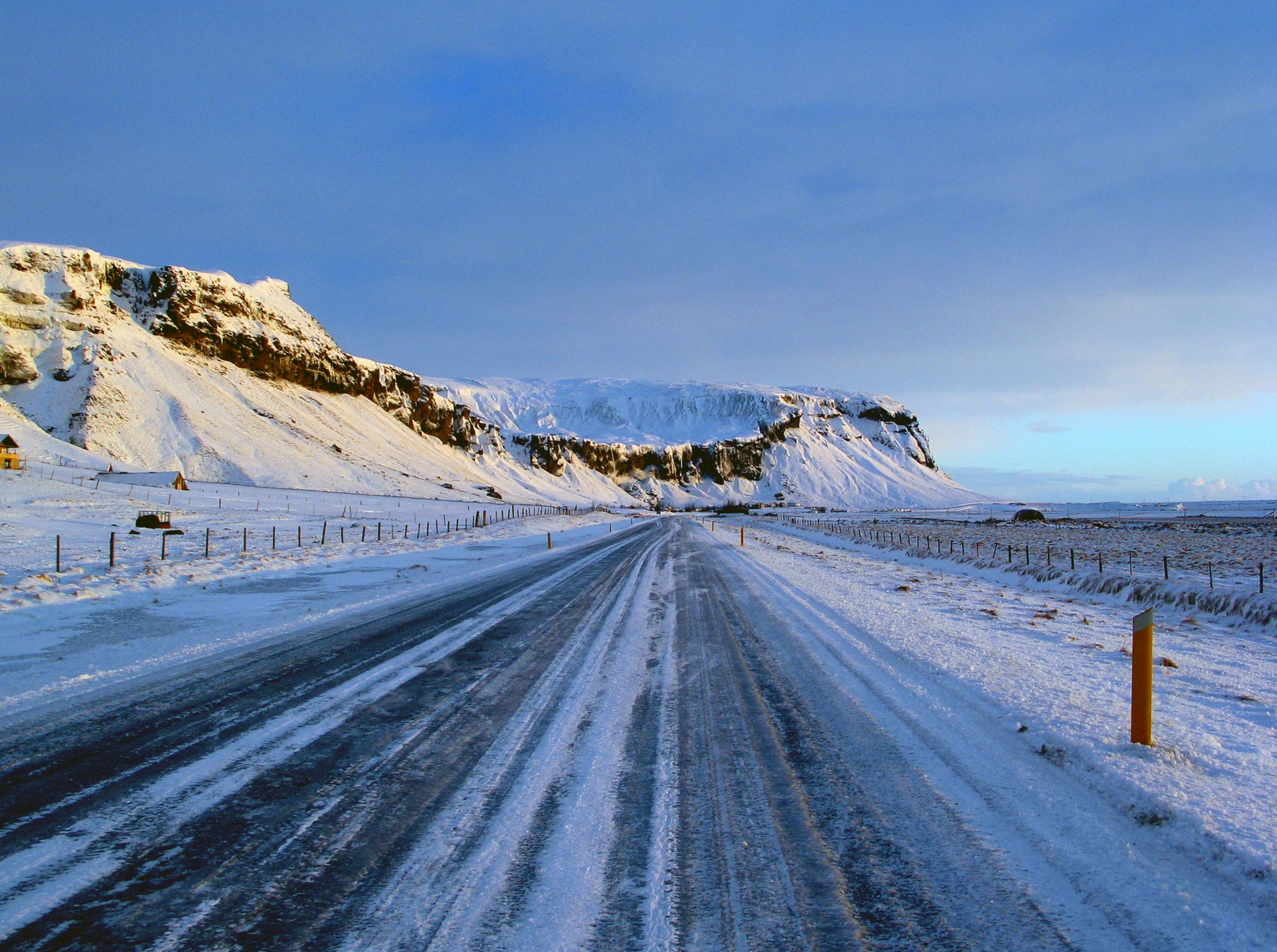
An icy stretch of Route 1 between Vík í Mýrdal and Höfn
