= List of tunnels in Iceland =

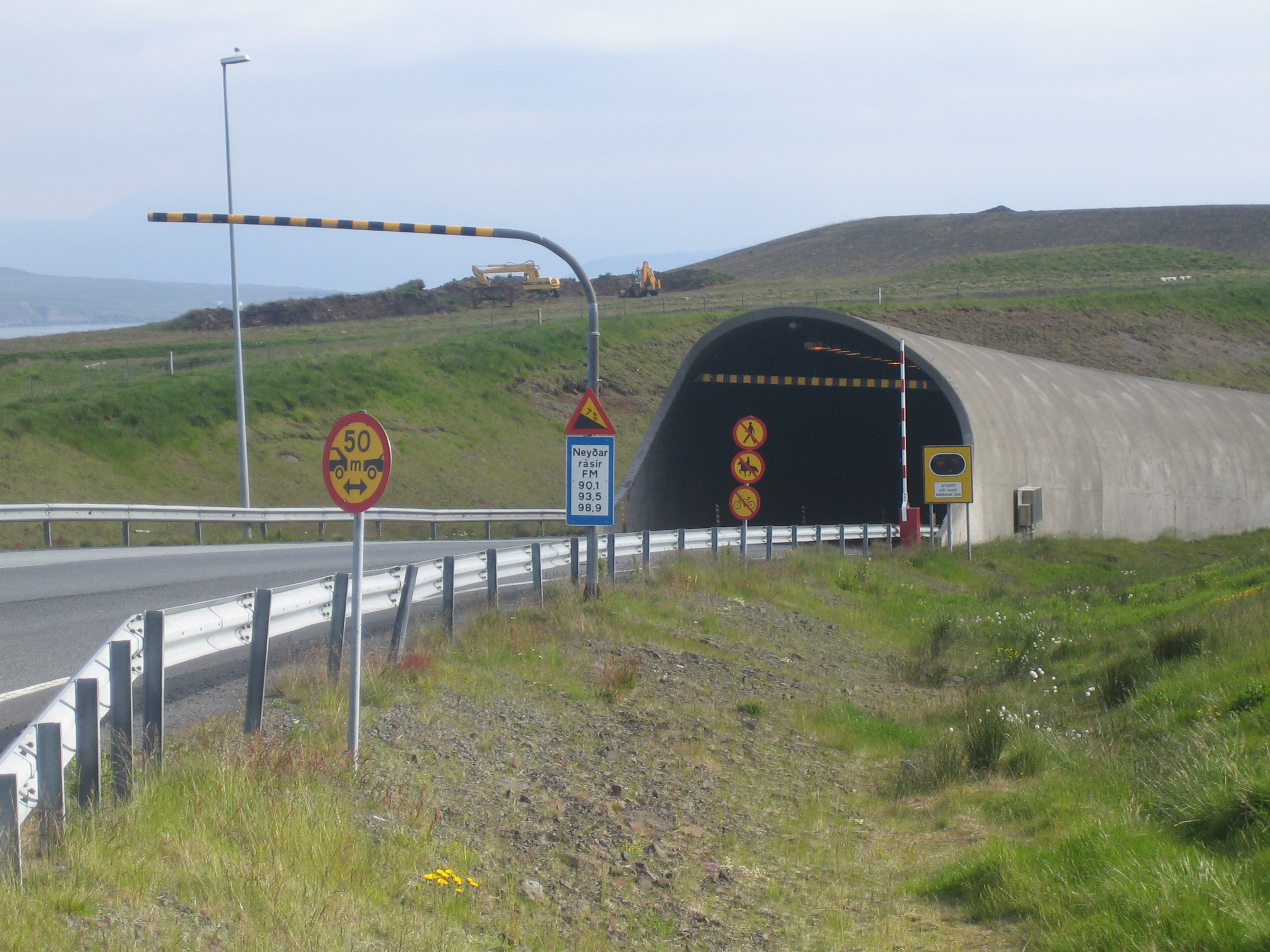
Hvalfjörður Tunnel is 5,770 m (18,930 ft) long, and reaches a depth of 165 m (541 ft) below sea level.

There are 14 open road tunnels in Iceland in the Icelandic road system. Additionally, there is one road tunnel only for use by a silicon plant in Húsavík. Tunnels in Iceland are mostly built under mountains to prevent winter isolation of remote communities which would otherwise have to depend on high roads that are often closed due to snow, to shorten distance between communities, and to increase road safety by bypassing dangerous stretches of road. A tunnel under a fjord, the Hvalfjörður Tunnel, is among the longest underwater road tunnels in the world, and goes as deep as 165 m (541 ft) below sea level.

Tunneling is a relatively recent trend in Icelandic road infrastructure. It started off slowly and was at first only used in extreme circumstances, such as under Arnardalshamar in 1948. The first tunnel of significant length was opened in 1967 and provided the northern town of Siglufjörður with its first year-round road link to the rest of the country. The second tunnel, opened in 1977, replaced a difficult road over the Oddskarð mountain pass in eastern Iceland, which could only be used during the short summer and was the only road link to the town of Neskaupstaður. The third tunnel was opened in 1992 and replaced a very hazardous mountainside road to the northern town of Ólafsfjörður. All three of these tunnels were built as a single lane with passing places at regular intervals. As improved engineering methods made tunneling cheaper and Iceland became more prosperous in the 1990s, tunnels became viable options for places where they had not been considered before. In 1996 the Vestfjarðagöng tunnel opened in the Westfjords region; it ended the winter isolation of three villages by linking them to the town of Ísafjörður. This tunnel was the last one built with single-lane segments.

In 1998 the sub-sea Hvalfjörður Tunnel opened, reducing the distance from Reykjavík to the town of Akranes by 60 kilometers and replacing the ferry service between the two. The distance between Reykjavík and other destinations on the north side of the fjord Hvalfjörður was reduced by 45 kilometers. It was the first tunnel in Iceland to have been financed, built and operated by a private entity and, as such, it was also the first tunnel where tolls were charged. The original plan assumed it would take 20 years (until 2018) to pay back the cost of building the tunnel. As per the original plan, the tunnel was turned over to the state on 30 September 2018 when the Icelandic Road Administration took over its operation. Traffic has proved to be significantly higher than originally projected: so high in fact, that the operator of the tunnel has suggested building a new tunnel alongside the current one, since traffic is reaching the threshold mandated by European regulation (10,000 vehicles daily) where traffic in opposing directions is meant to be separated.

Nine tunnels have opened since the beginning of the 21st century. In the 2010s, three tunnels opened: Bolungarvíkurgöng on route 61 in the Westfjords between Hnifsdalur and Bolungarvik, replacing the road which was often affected by rockfalls and avalanches, and Héðinsfjarðargöng I and II on route 76 in the Northeastern Region between the towns of Ólafsfjörður and Siglufjörður, reducing the distance between them to 15 km.

== Tunnels ==
Name	Length	Lanes	Date of opening	Notes	Location	Route #
Vestfjarðagöng (West Fjords Tunnel)	Breiðadalur 4,150 m (13,615 ft)	1^{a}	1996, September	Tunnels meet in a 3-way junction	Westfjords (Ísafjörður - Suðureyri - Breiðadalur)	60
Vestfjarðagöng (West Fjords Tunnel)	Botnsdalur 2,907 m (9,537 ft)	1^{a}	1996, September	Tunnels meet in a 3-way junction	Westfjords (Ísafjörður - Suðureyri - Breiðadalur)	65
Vestfjarðagöng (West Fjords Tunnel)	Tungudalur 2,103 m (6,900 ft)	2	1996, September	Tunnels meet in a 3-way junction	Westfjords (Ísafjörður - Suðureyri - Breiðadalur)	60
Vestfjarðagöng (West Fjords Tunnel)	Total 9,160 m (30,052 ft)		1996, September	Tunnels meet in a 3-way junction	Westfjords (Ísafjörður - Suðureyri - Breiðadalur)	
Vaðlaheiðargöng	7,400 m (24,278 ft)	2	2018, 21 December		Northeastern Region (Eyjafjörður - Fnjóskadalur)	1
Héðinsfjarðargöng I	7,100 m (23,294 ft)	2	2010, 2 October		Northeastern Region (Ólafsfjörður - Héðinsfjörður)	76
Norðfjarðargöng	7,908 m (25,945 ft)	2	2017, 11 November	Replaced Oddskarðsgöng	Eastern Region (Eskifjörður - Norðfjörður)	92
Fáskrúðsfjarðargöng	5,900 m (19,357 ft)	2	2005, 9 September		Eastern Region (Fáskrúðsfjörður - Reyðarfjörður)	1
Hvalfjörður Tunnel	5,770 m (18,930 ft)	2^{b}	1998, 1 July		Capital Region — Western Region	1
Dýrafjarðargöng	5,600 m (18,373 ft)	2	2020, 25 October		Westfjords (Arnarfjörður - Dýrafjörður)	60
Bolungarvíkurgöng	5,400 m (17,717 ft)	2	2010, 25 September		Westfjords (Bolungarvík - Hnífsdal)	61
Héðinsfjarðargöng II	3,900 m (12,795 ft)	2	2010, 2 October		Northeastern Region (Héðinsfjörður - Siglufjörður)	76
Múlagöng (Ólafsfjardarmúli)	3,400 m (11,155 ft)	1^{a}	1991, 1 March		Northeastern Region (Dalvík - Ólafsfjörð)	82
Almannaskarðsgöng	1,300 m (4,265 ft)	2	2005, 24 June		Eastern Region (Route 1, east of Höfn)	1
Húsavíkurhöfði Tunnel	992 m (3,255 ft)	2	2017, 4 November	Not open to the public	Northeastern Region (Húsavík)	—
Strákagöng	800 m (2,625 ft)	1^{a}	1967		Northwestern Region (west of Siglufjörður)	76
Oddskarðsgöng	640 m (2,100 ft)	1^{a}	1977	Closed 11 November 2017	Eastern Region (west of Neskaupstaður)	92
Arnardalshamar Tunnel	30 m (98 ft)	2	1948		Westfjords	61
Fjarðarheiðargöng	13,500 m (44,291 ft)	2	>2040	Planned	Eastern Region (Egilsstaðir - Seyðisfjörður)	93
Fljótagöng	5,200 m	2	2030	Planned to replace Strákagöng	Northwestern Region (west of Siglufjörður)	76

^{a} Single lane with passing places
^{b} There is a third lane for passing on the uphill side at the north end of the tunnel.

== See also ==
- List of tunnels by location
- Transport in Iceland
- Vegagerðin
