= Metrostav =

Czech construction company

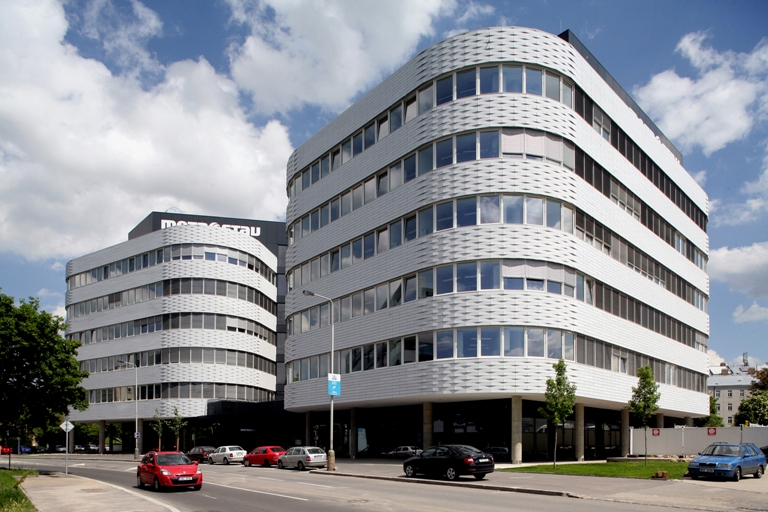
- Headquarters of Metrostav in Palmovka
- Type: Joint-stock company
- Industry: construction
- Founded: 23 May 1991
- Headquarters: Prague, Czech Republic
- Revenue: 57,449,784,000 Czech koruna (2025)
- Operating income: 1,734,181,000 Czech koruna (2025)
- Net income: 1,625,741,000 Czech koruna (2025)
- Total assets: 53,233,683,000 Czech koruna (2025)
- Number of employees: 6,614 (2025)

Metrostav a.s. is a Czech company headquartered in Prague and the managing company of Metrostav Group, a construction and civil engineering group operating in Czechia and other European countries. The group's activities include tunnelling, transport infrastructure, residential and commercial buildings, and industrial and energy construction.

Established in 1971 as a state-owned enterprise to build the Prague Metro, Metrostav became a joint-stock company in 1991 and subsequently diversified into other areas of construction. Its projects have included the Blanka Tunnel complex, Troja Bridge and the Ejpovice railway tunnel, the latter built in a consortium with Subterra.

== History ==
Metrostav was established on 1 January 1971 as a state-owned enterprise separated from Vodní stavby to build the Prague Metro. It was the general contractor for the first section of Line C, between Sokolovská (now Florenc) and Kačerov, which opened on 9 May 1974. In 1991, Metrostav became a joint-stock company and subsequently diversified into residential, commercial, industrial and transport construction.

In 2000, the Slovak construction company Doprastav acquired a 62.5% stake in Metrostav through its subsidiary Doprastav Bohemia. Metrostav subsequently expanded through acquisitions. Metrostav bought a controlling stake in Subterra in 2004. By August 2005, it owned about 92% of the company, and Subterra's shareholders voted to buy out the remaining minority holdings. In 2013, Metrostav bought the Austrian tunnelling contractor Alpine BeMo Tunnelling after its parent company, Alpine, became insolvent.

Overseas contracts included the Héðinsfjörður tunnels in Iceland, awarded to Metrostav and local partner Háfell in 2006, and the Norðfjörður tunnel, awarded to Metrostav and Suðurverk in 2013. Metrostav and Suðurverk also built the Dýrafjarðargöng tunnel, which opened in October 2020.

In 2026, the group reorganised its management, with Metrostav a.s. moving towards a holding-headquarters role and construction activities undertaken by individual group companies. Aleš Gothard became chairman of Metrostav a.s.'s board and president of Metrostav Group on 1 July. The parent company's general-director position was abolished, and Jaroslav Heran moved to lead Metrostav CZ, which brought together building and water-engineering activities previously undertaken by several Metrostav divisions.

=== Legal proceedings ===
In June 2022, the Prague High Court convicted Metrostav of bribery and manipulating public contracts in the second branch of the corruption case involving former Central Bohemian governor David Rath. It imposed a CZK 10 million fine and a three-year public-procurement ban. Metrostav Infrastructure also received a three-year ban. The Supreme Court rejected Metrostav's extraordinary appeal in 2025.

In May 2023, the Prague High Court imposed an aggregate sentence on Metrostav in the Hotel Bohemia Chrudim case, incorporating earlier convictions. It included a CZK 35 million fine and a three-year public-procurement ban; Metrostav Infrastructure also received an aggregate three-year ban. In April 2026, the Constitutional Court rejected Metrostav Infrastructure's complaint concerning the transfer of criminal liability following the transfer of part of Metrostav's business to the company.

== Group structure ==
Metrostav a.s. is the managing company of Metrostav Group. Following a reorganisation in July 2026, it sets the group's strategy and coordinates its operating companies. These include Metrostav CZ, Subterra, Metrostav DIZ, MI Roads, Metrostav TBR and Metrostav Development.

The group also includes Austria-based BeMo Tunnelling, Metrostav Slovakia, Metrostav Polska, Metrostav Deutschland and Metrostav Norge.

== Operations ==
Metrostav Group undertakes tunnelling, road, bridge and railway construction, as well as residential, commercial and public buildings. Its activities also include industrial and energy projects. Metrostav DIZ is involved in two energy projects at Mělník: a combined-cycle heat and power plant with Siemens Energy and a waste-to-energy plant with Subterra. The contracts were signed in 2025 and 2023, respectively.

The group's overseas projects have included road tunnels in Iceland, a section of Poland's S7 expressway and road and tunnel construction in Norway. In Germany, BeMo Tunnelling and Metrostav DIZ are members of the consortium building the replacement Levensau Bridge over the Kiel Canal.

== Selected projects ==
- Prague Metro, Line A extension – four-stations opened in April 2015
- Blanka Tunnel complex, Prague – road tunnel complex opened in September 2015
- Troja Bridge, Prague – road and tram bridge across the Vltava, built in 2010–2014
- National Museum, Prague – reconstruction of the historic building in 2015–2019
- Quadrio, a mixed-use complex above Národní třída metro station in Prague, built in 2012–2014
- Ejpovice Tunnel – railway tunnel built with Subterra and opened in 2018
- Norðfjörður tunnel, Iceland – road tunnel built with Suðurverk in 2013–2017
- Joberg Tunnel, Norway, built with Bertelsen & Garpestad and opened in September 2017
