= Hvalfjörður Tunnel =

Tunnel in Iceland

Coordinates: 64°18′35″N 21°54′14″W

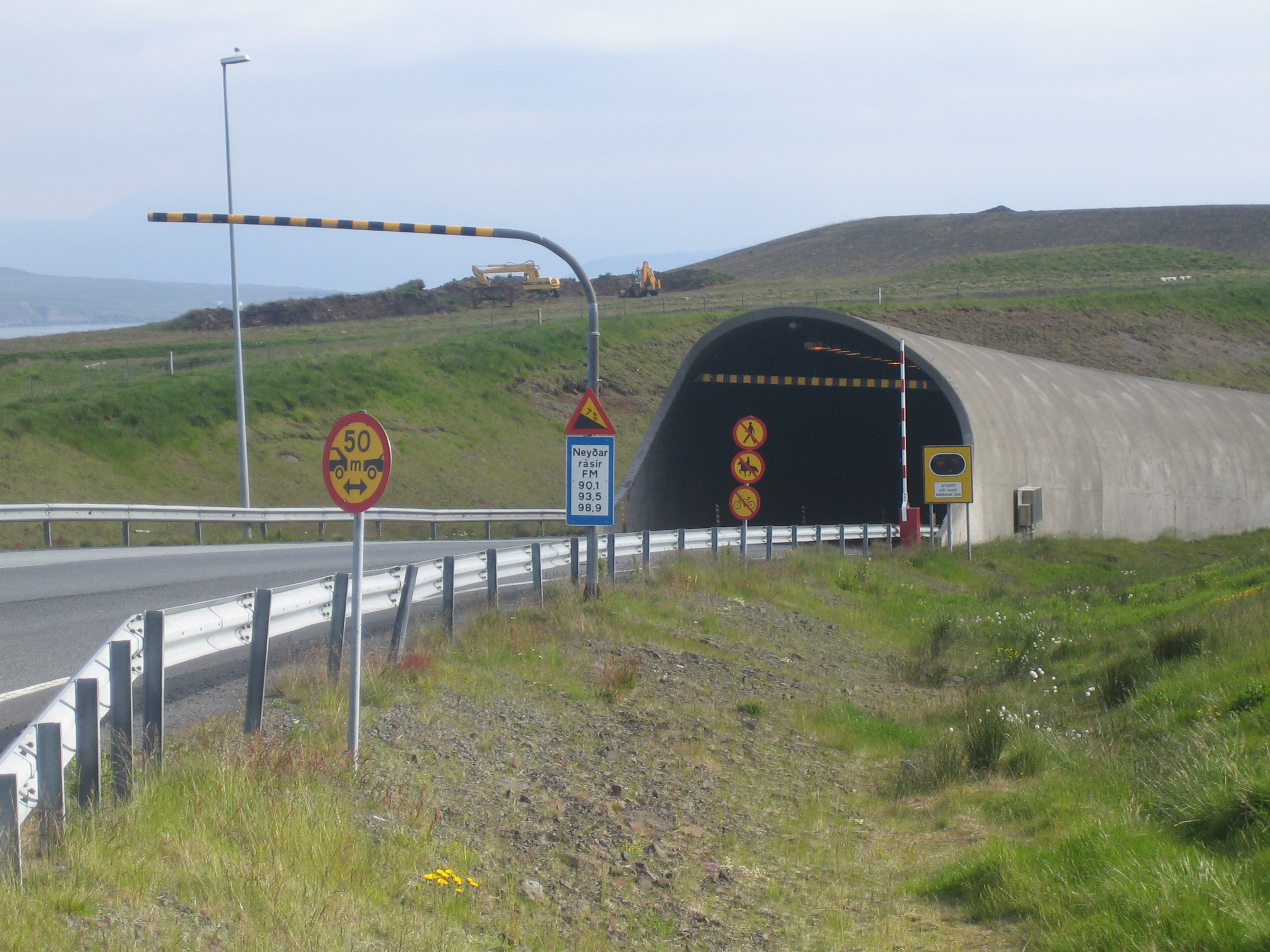
- South entrance
- Interactive map of Hvalfjörður Tunnel

Overview
- Location: Western Region and Capital Region, Iceland
- Route: 1

Operation
- Work began: 1996
- Opened: 1998
- Operator: Icelandic Road Administration (since 2018); Spölur (until 2018)
- Traffic: Automotive
- Vehicles per day: Summer: 11,000 Winter: 6,700

Technical
- Length: 5,770 m (18,930 ft)
- No. of lanes: 2-3
- Operating speed: 70km/h
- Max elevation: 15 m (49 ft)
- Min elevation: −165 m (−541 ft)
- Grade: 8.1% (max.)

The Hvalfjörður Tunnel (Icelandic: Hvalfjarðargöng pronounced [ˈkʰvalˌfjarðarˌkœyŋk]) is a subsea road tunnel under the Hvalfjörður fjord in Iceland and a part of Route 1. It is 5,770 meters (18,930 ft) long and reaches a depth of 165 meters (541 ft) below sea level. Opened on 11 July 1998, it shortens the distance from Reykjavík to the western and northern parts of the country by 45 kilometers (28 mi). Passing the fjord now takes 7 minutes instead of about an hour.

The tunnel was constructed as a private-public partnership (PPP) project, managed by the company Spölur, while the Verkís company handled almost all of the design. Spölur was also the owner and operator of the tunnel until 2018, when ownership and administration of the tunnel were transferred as planned to the Icelandic Road Administration (Vegagerðin). This project was a milestone in Icelandic construction as it was the first private finance initiative without direct funding by the state treasury.

== Construction ==
The construction of the tunnel was started in 1996, and completed in 1998 at a cost of about ISK 5,000 million (USD 70 million). The tunnel was designed for annual average daily traffic of 5,000 vehicles.

While the sub-sea tunnel deepest point is 165 meters (541 ft) below sea level, the deepest sea depth is 40 meters (130 ft), and the minimum rock coverage is 40 meters (130 ft). The tunnel is a single bore with 2 lanes, except on the northern end of the tunnel where there are 3 lanes: 2 lanes on the uphill section and 1 lane downhill.

== Tolls ==
The tunnel is toll free as of 28 September 2018, the date when the tunnel was turned over from the private operator Spölur to the Icelandic Road Administration (Vegagerðin). Previously, the toll for vehicles less than 6 meters (20 ft) in length was ISK 1,000 (USD 9.80). Motorcycles and larger vehicles paid different tolls. Pedestrians and cyclists are not permitted. The money went to pay for the construction of the tunnel by Spölur.

The original plan assumed it would take 20 years (until 2018) to pay back the cost of building the tunnel, but the traffic volume has proved to be significantly higher than originally projected. The volume of traffic is so high that the operator of the tunnel has suggested building a new tunnel alongside the current one because traffic is reaching the threshold mandated by a European regulation (8,000 vehicles daily) over which traffic in opposing directions should be separated.

== Safety issues ==
The Hvalfjörður Tunnel received a bad rating in the 2010 European tunnel test, which is carried out annually by the German automobile club ADAC. Different aspects were criticized and are also mentioned in the EuroTAP test (see external links), especially the weak lighting, absence of an automatic fire alarm system, too weak ventilation in case of a fire and distance to the next fire station (28 kilometers or 17 miles). There are alcoves every 500 meters (1,600 ft) to facilitate turning around, and the storage capacity for water leakage is 2,000 cubic meters (71,000 cu ft).

Between 2007 and 2013, several improvements to the tunnel's security were made, according to the newspaper Morgunblaðið resulting in a doubling of the tunnel's security level. The improvements included better lighting, setting up a monitoring system, new emergency lights and more fire extinguishers. In 2020, improved LED lighting on lane shoulders was installed. In 2024, average speed cameras were installed in the tunnel.

== Images ==
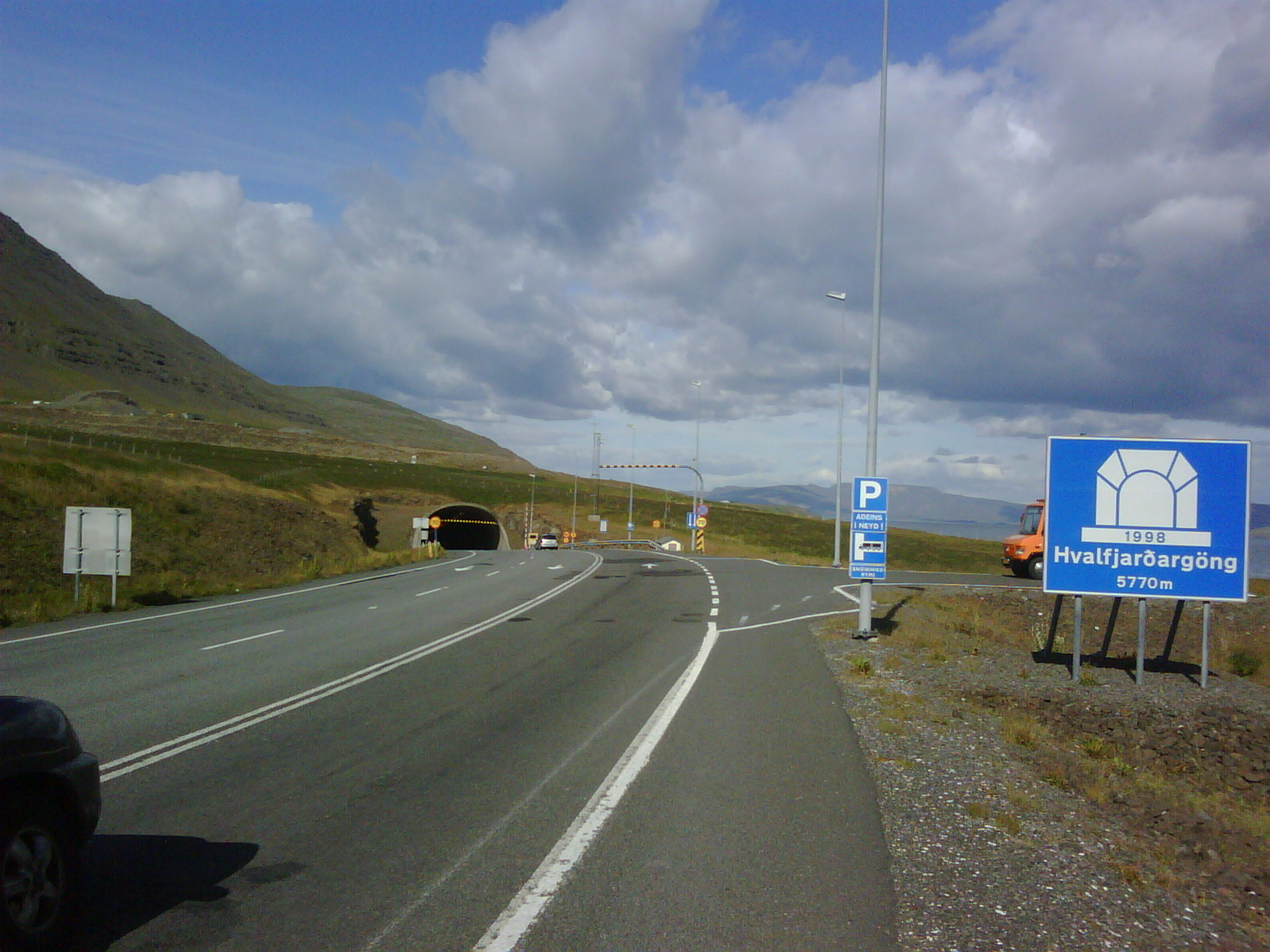
North entrance

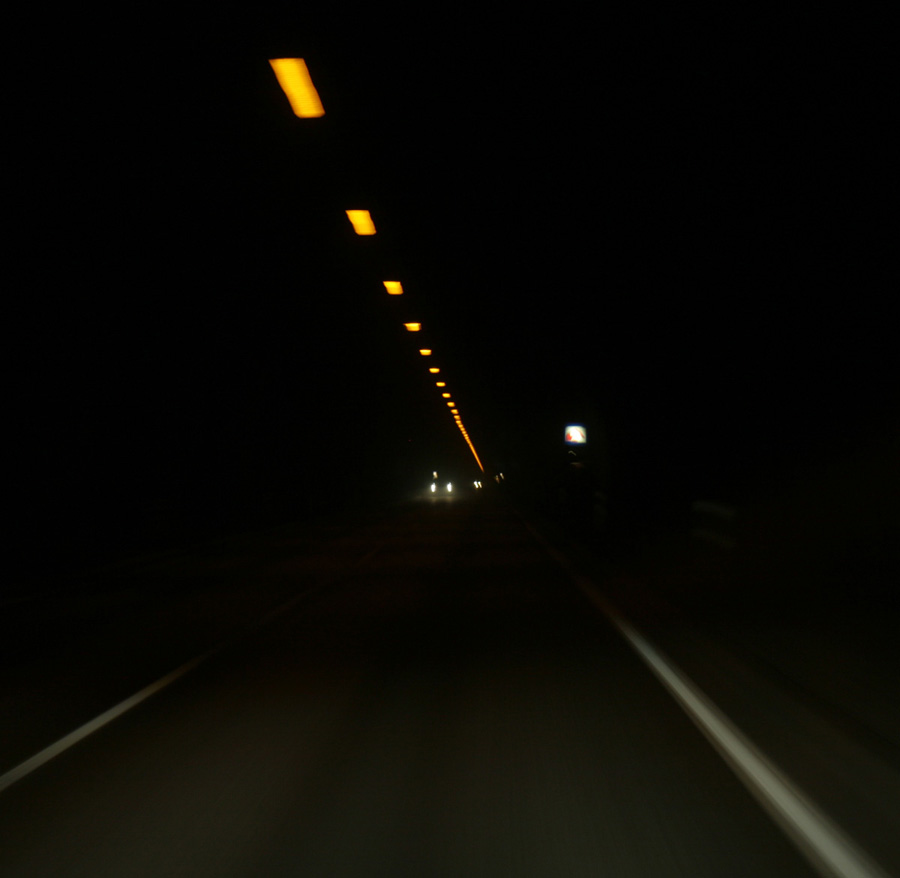
Middle of the tunnel (2007)

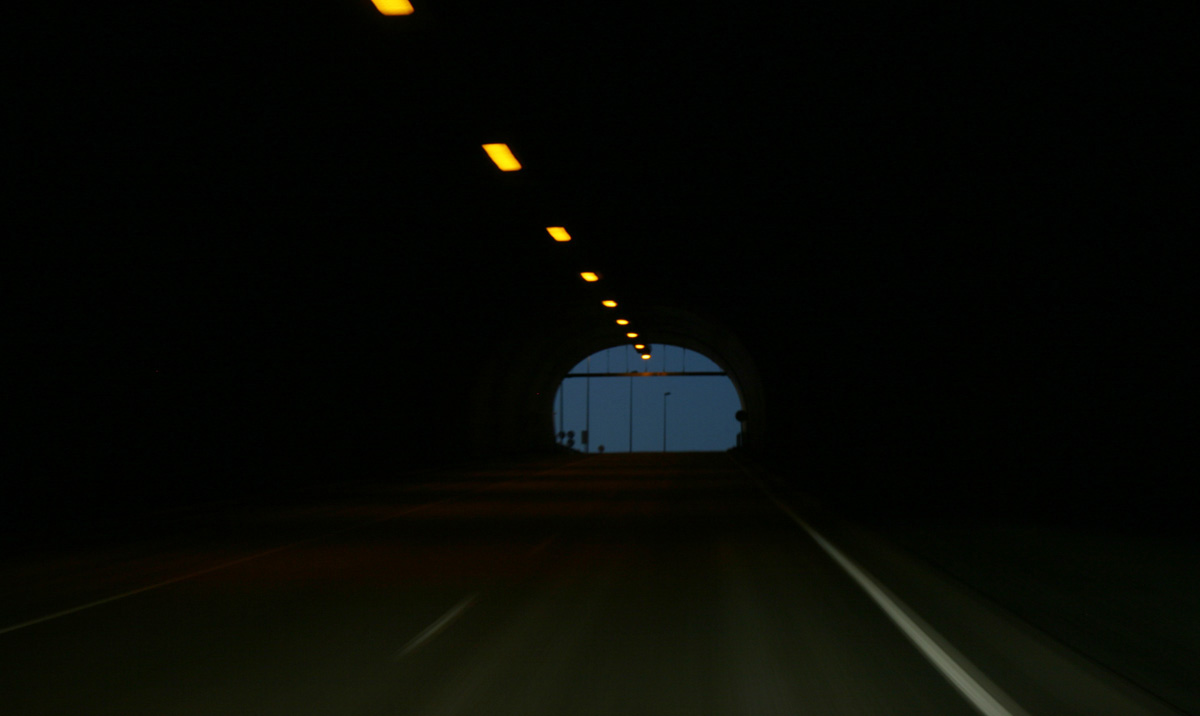
Exit of the tunnel (2007)

== See also ==
- List of tunnels in Iceland
