= Herring Era Museum =

Maritime museum in Siglufjörður, Iceland

Coordinates: 66.1485°N 18.9130°W

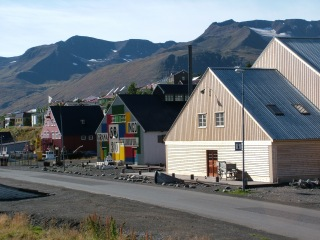
The Herring Era Museum

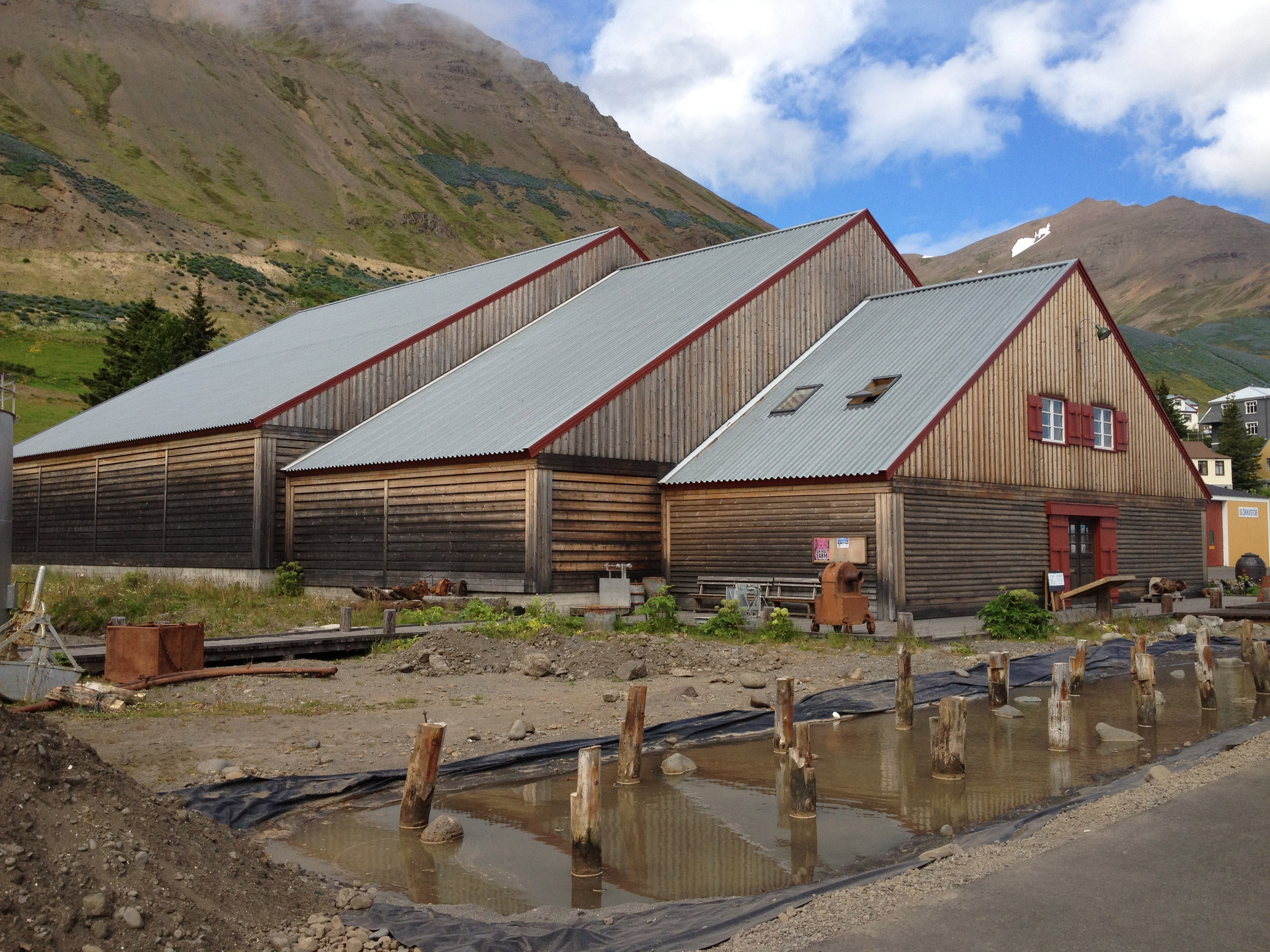
The "Boat House" of the Herring Era Museum at Siglufjörður

The Herring Era Museum (Icelandic: Síldarminjasafnið á Siglufirði [ˈsiltarˌmɪnjaˌsapnɪð auː ˈsɪklʏˌfɪrðɪ]) is located in Siglufjörður, Iceland. It is Iceland's largest maritime museum and the only Icelandic museum to have won the European Museum Award. The museum officially opened in 1994 in Róaldsbrakki, an old salting station which had been left abandoned after the collapse of the herring stock in 1969. Additionally two more buildings have been built for the museums exhibitions since then. Also, the museum owns the Old Slipway down by the harbour. Siglufjörður used to be the center of the herring fisheries in Iceland, and the herring played a very large role in the nations economy and industry, providing as much as 44% of the nations export income during some years. As of 2023, ticket prices for adults are 2.200 ISK; seniors and youth (under 20) 1.200 ISK; children (under 16) free, accompanied by adults; groups (of 10 or more) 1.800 ISK.

== History ==
Many towns, villages and areas along the north and east coast of Iceland that were deeply affected by the arrival of the herring adventure but nowhere did the herring adventure have such an impact as in Siglufjörður. Norwegian fishermen came sailing on their herring vessels during the summer of 1903, and thereby the Herring Adventure had started. Within forty years this once tiny little village had transformed into a thriving town of more than three thousand inhabitants. For years the entire life of Siglufjörður centred on the herring catch and its processing - the town's twenty-three salting stations and five reducing factories were a living reminder of that. Siglufjörður was also one of the most important ports in Iceland and on more than one occasion the herring exported from the town accounted for over 20% of the nation's total exports.

As the herring adventure progressed, a goldrush-like atmosphere settled over the town, leading to Siglufjörður been dubbed the "Atlantic Klondike". The town also became a magnet for herring speculators who came and went, some making a lot of money during the stay, and others not. With its booming industry, Siglufjörður also became a mecca for tens of thousands of workers and labourers seeking employment.

When bad weather and storms broke, the sheltered waters of the fjord became home to a massed fleet of hundreds of herring ships. Life on land was just as colourful, the streets of Siglufjörður were filled with crowds and activities that they would resemble the streets of major cities.

Marine resources are notoriously unstable, and herring is no exception. Following depressed catch figures in the years around 1950, herring stocks began to be fished as never before. This was due to a new and more efficient fishing technology developed by Icelandic pioneers. Other countries were quick in claiming these advances for themselves.

It was during this time that the catches of herring in the waters east of Iceland improved. By 1965, the catches from east Iceland were higher than those from northern Iceland due to low sea temperatures. It resulted in economic improvement in the east temporarily, before it declined in 1969. The collapse of the Norwegian-Icelandic herring stock can be associated mainly with overfishing by the main fishing industries of Norway, Iceland, and the Soviet Union.

Iceland's herring towns, indeed the country's entire employment and economic sectors, suffered a severe blow with the disappearance of the herring. During the late 1960s, herring accounted for up to half of Iceland's export income, and was crucial in powering the country's dizzying economic growth. The great herring adventure was over.

Siglufjörður, as many other herring towns around the country was left without its main industry – the collapse of the herring stock led Siglufjörður to an era of depression and regression, with salting stations, bunkhouses, piers and so on being left abandoned and without a role.

In 1989 a group of local volunteers formed an association, with their goal as to renovate the old building Róaldsbrakki, preserve the history of Siglufjörður and its herring adventure. Many of those volunteers contributed significant amount of work to the rebuilding and development of Róaldsbrakki which took place between 1989 and 1996. The purpose of the museum is to tell the overall history of the herring industry in Iceland and also shed light on the important contribution of Siglufjörður to the growth and progress of Iceland in the 19th and 20th centuries. The renovating and building of the museum has been very costly, plus all the volunteer work. The project of putting up The Herring Era Museum has been supported by the Icelandic government, the local municipality (Siglufjörður – later Fjallabyggð), various funds, companies, societies and individuals.

== Museum buildings and exhibitions ==
Today the museum consists of three main museum buildings; Róaldsbrakki, Grána and The Boathouse.

Róaldsbrakki is a former Norwegian salting station built in 1907 that now exhibits the history of Iceland's herring industry. Its first floor displays artifacts related to salting herring and preparing it for export. The exhibits also include historical explanations, photographs, and films shot in Siglufjörður around the 1940s. The upper floor contains the building's former living quarters. During each herring season, thousands of people came to Siglufjörður seeking work, including herring girls, fishermen, and other workers. Hundreds of herring girls came from other parts of Iceland to work during the summer and were housed in the stations where they worked.

Grána [ˈkraːna] – a 1930s herring factory explains to visitors how those reducing plants transformed the herring into both meal and oil. The Grána was built for the museum and opened in 2003. All the heavy machinery which is to be found in the exhibition was gathered from old, abandoned herring factories around the country - leading to the exhibition looking like a real, original factory. The Herring Museums website sais: "Our work has been to breathe life back into these ghost factories. [...] Our goal is to introduce the public to the heyday of Iceland's herring reduction industry, the 1930s – 1950s. This is why we built Grána, a large factory building modelled on the original Grána herring reduction factory which operated in Siglufjordur between 1919 and 1950. [...] spending years dismantling piece by piece two of Iceland's most remote ghost factories (those at Ingólfsfjörður and Hjalteyri) and transporting everything back to Siglufjörður [...]

The Boathouse – is the newest museum building, which was inaugurated by Crown Prince Håkon of Norway on 29 June 2004. In the Boat House a little example of the town's bustling harbour has been recreated. Visitors can take a walk along the piers where ten boats and ships are docked, and you'll hear the sound of seagulls and waves breaking. Also, visitors are welcome to go on board the biggest herring vessel of the exhibition. Apart from being a museum building, The Boathouse is occasionally used as a concert hall - where bands and artists use the biggest herring vessel as a stage, and chairs and benches are placed around the piers, allowing up to 250 people to enjoy a concert.

The Old Slipway down by the harbour is an old boat building garage since the 1930s. It is a mix of an exhibition and an open workshop. The walls display the 200 years history of boat building in Siglufjörður as well as various old tools used for wooden boat building, some of them being over 100 years old and still functioning. Also, the Old Slipway is a workshop, where both educated boatbuilders and amateurs can get permission to bring in their old boats for renovation, or even build new boats – based on old Icelandic knowledge and methods.

Salting demonstrations, or live exhibitions, are offered upon request or booking. They happen on the dock outside Róaldsbrakki museum building. Enjoying these shows, visitors are allowed to step back in time as the herring girls salt and pack herring into barrels, smoke their cigarettes and gossip about the handsome fishermen they met at yesterdays ball. Workers take away their full barrels and bring them new ones to keep on filling, while the accordion player uses his instrument to create the right atmosphere.

== Awards ==
The Herring Era Museum in Siglufjörður, Iceland, has won several awards:

- The Tourist Board Innovation Award, 1998.
- Honorary Recognition, Icelandic Parliament, 1999.
- The Icelandic Museum Award, 2000.
- INVEST – Industrial Development Society Incentive Award, 2003.
- The European Museum Award, The Micheletti Award, the best new industry museum in Europe, 2004.
- Icelandic Tourist Board - Environment Award, 2017.

== Opening hours, entrance fees & visitor numbers ==
May and September the museum is open daily from 13:00 – 17:00

At summertime, June, July and August it is open daily from 10:00 – 18:00

At wintertime, the museum is open by arrangement and upon request.

Entrance fee is ISK 2200 for adults, ISK 1200 for seniors and students, and no fee is charged for children under 16 years old. Note that the ticket is valid for all museum buildings as well as for The Folk Music Center which is located close by the Herring Museum.

Visitor numbers have increased highly in the twenty years the museum has been open. In 1994 there were around 4,000 visitors at the museum, but for the past years, from 2015 to 2017 visitor numbers have been as high as 26,000 visitors, with up to 62% foreigners.
