= Múlagöng =

One lane tunnel in Iceland

Coordinates: 66.0785°N 18.5682°W

Múli Tunnel
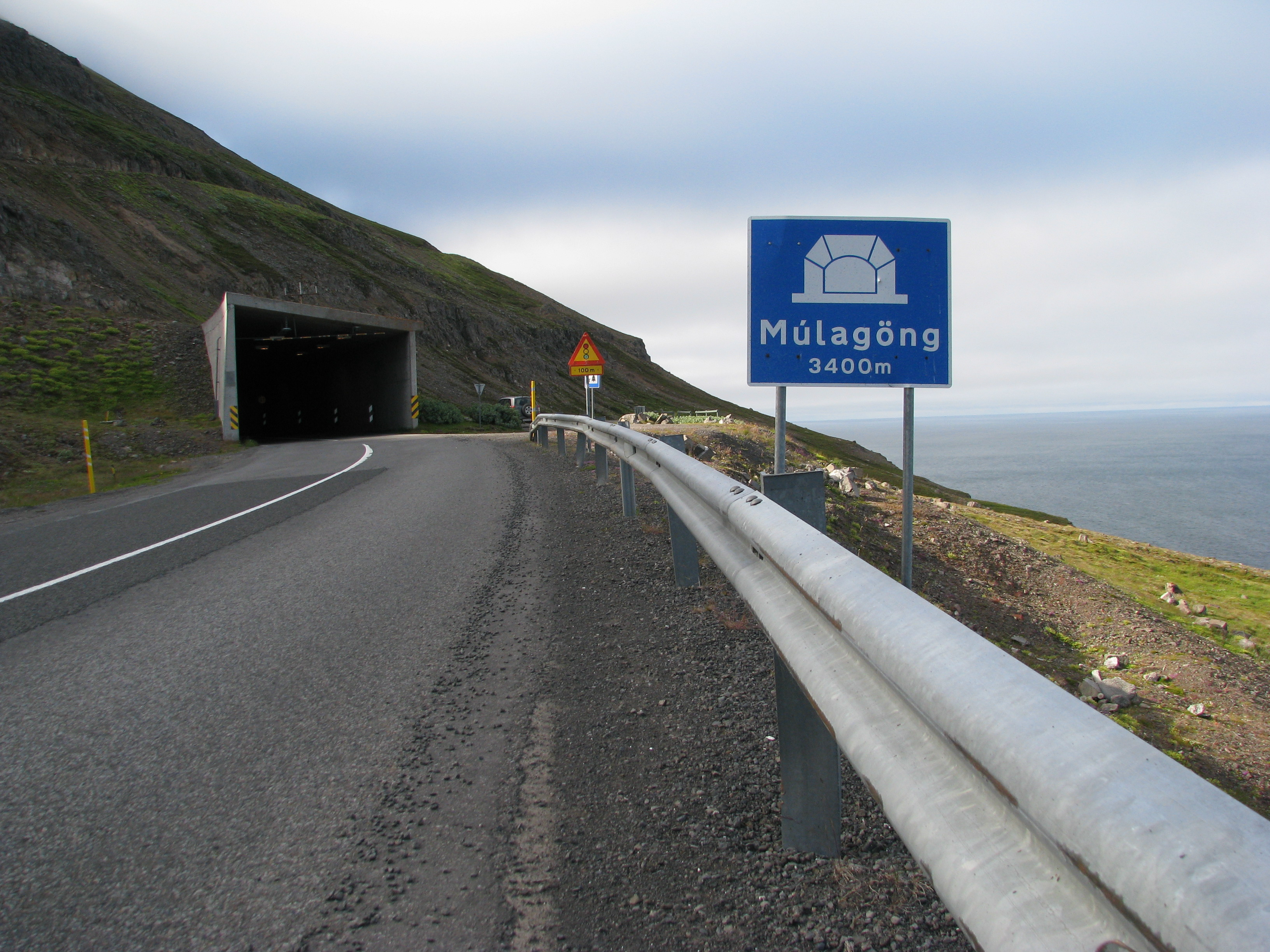
- Eastern entrance

Overview
- Location: Fjallabyggð, Iceland
- Route: 82

Operation
- Opened: 1991
- Operator: Vegagerðin
- Traffic: Automotive
- Vehicles per day: 500

Technical
- Length: 3.4 km (2.1 mi)
- No. of lanes: 1

Múlagöng (Icelandic pronunciation: [ˈmuːlaˌkœyŋk]) or Ólafsfjarðargöng [ˈouːlafsˌfjarðarˌkœyŋk] is a one lane tunnel in Iceland, located in Northeastern Region along Route 82, connecting Dalvík and Ólafsfjörður. It was the fourth tunnel constructed in Iceland. It has a length of 3,400 m (11,155 ft) and was opened on March 1, 1991.
