= Strákagöng =

Tunnel in Iceland

Coordinates: 66.1825°N 18.9167°W

Strákar Tunnel
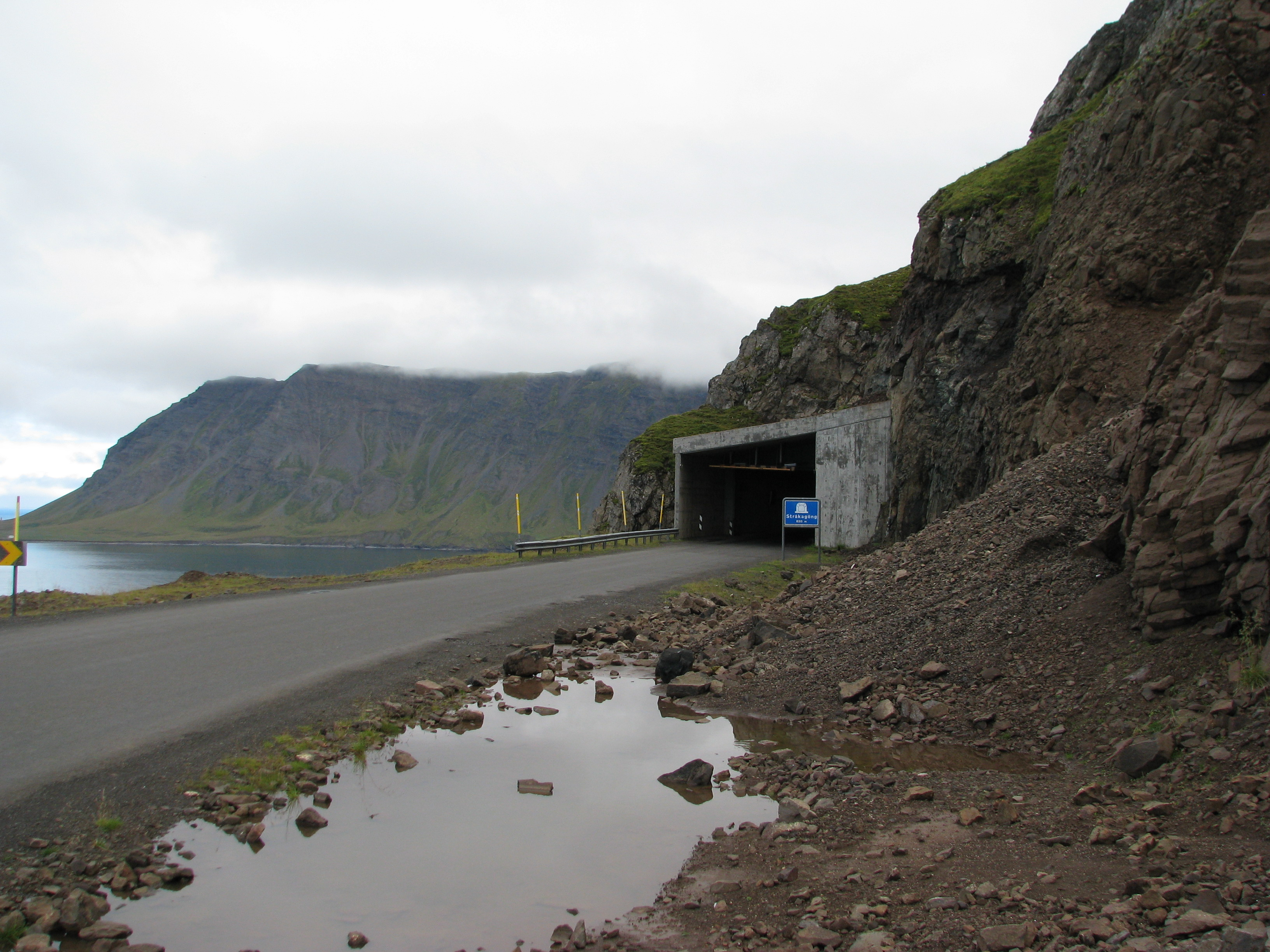
- Northwest entrance
- Interactive map of Strákar Tunnel

Overview
- Location: Fjallabyggð, Iceland
- Route: 76

Operation
- Work began: 1965
- Opened: 1967
- Operator: Vegagerðin
- Traffic: Automotive
- Vehicles per day: 250

Technical
- Length: 900 m (3,000 ft)
- No. of lanes: 1

Strákagöng (Icelandic pronunciation: [ˈstrauːkaˌkœyŋk], lit. 'Strákar Tunnel') is a tunnel in Iceland, located in Northwestern Region along Route 76. It has a length of 800 m (2,625 ft) and was opened in 1967. It is the second tunnel ever built in Iceland, only preceded by a minor tunnel of 30 meters between Ísafjörður and Súðavík. Prior to the tunnel being built, the only road connection to the town of Siglufjörður was a very difficult mountain road built in 1946, that was closed about 5 months a year due to snow.
