= Dýrafjarðargöng =

Road tunnel in Iceland

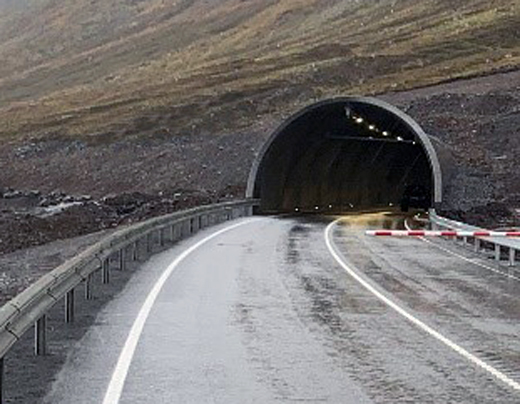
- Interactive map of Dýrafjarðargöng

Overview
- Coordinates: 65°48′44″N 23°13′06″W
- Status: Open
- Route: 60

Operation
- Work began: 2017
- Opens: 2020
- Operator: Vegagerðin
- Traffic: Automotive

Technical
- Length: 5,600 metres (18,372.7 ft)
- No. of lanes: 2

Dýrafjarðargöng (Icelandic pronunciation: [ˈtiːraˌfjarðarˌkœyŋk], regionally also [-ˌkœŋk], lit. 'Dýrafjörður Tunnel') is a tunnel in Iceland connecting Arnarfjörður and Dýrafjörður.

The tunnel, that opened on 25 October 2020, is 5.6 km long and shortened the route of Vestfjarðavegur by over 27 km. in the Westfjords and is important in linking north and south parts of the Westfjords. It relieves the mountain pass that is unpaved and closed most of the year.

Its construction began in 2017 and the estimated cost was ISK 9.2 billion (2016 prices). The main contractors of the tunnel were Icelandic company Suðurverk and Czech company Metrostav.
