= Vestfjarðagöng =

Tunnel in Iceland

Coordinates: 66°03′09″N 23°16′44″W

Westfjords Tunnel
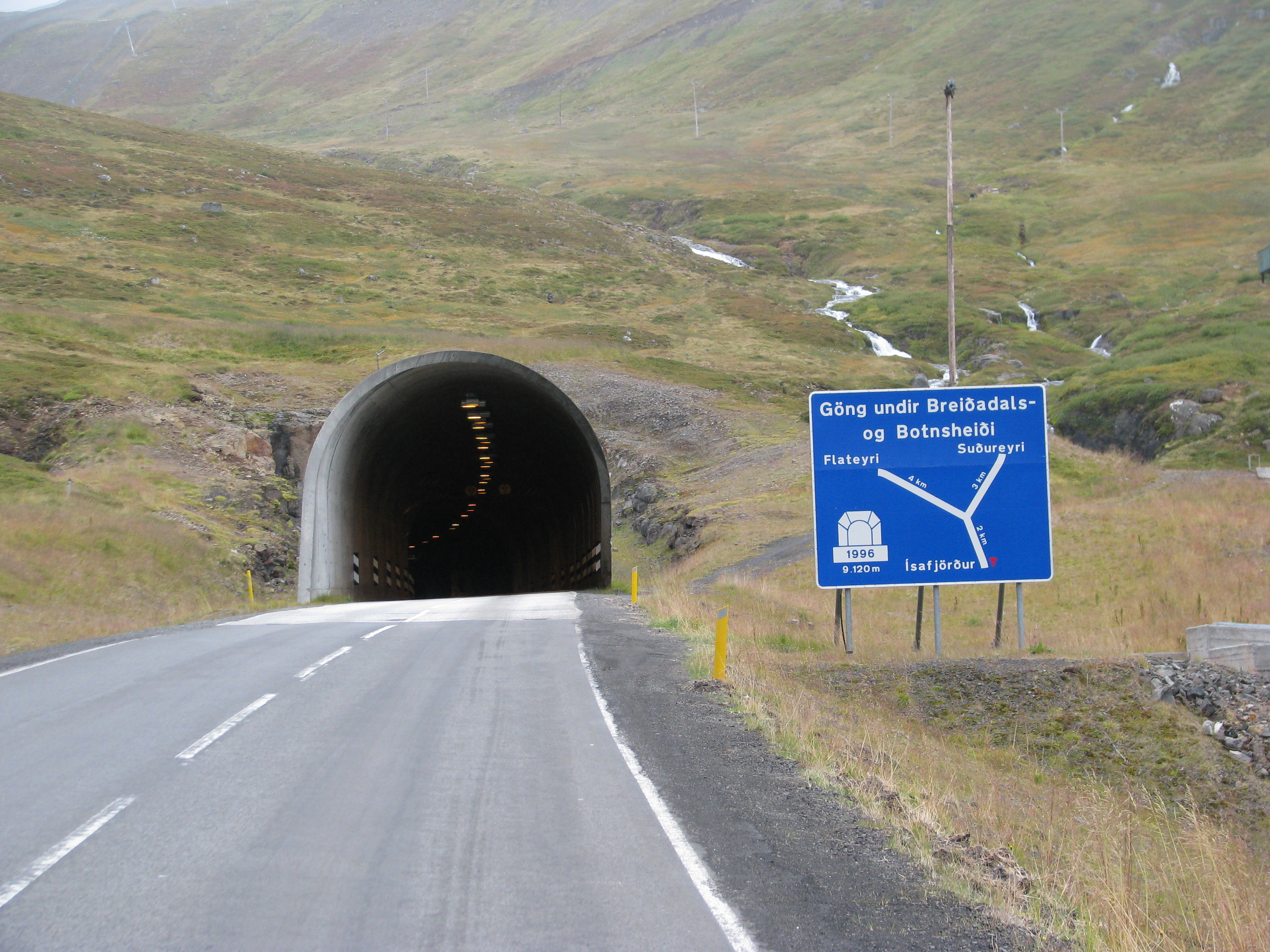
- East entrance
- Interactive map of Westfjords Tunnel

Overview
- Location: Ísafjarðarbær, Iceland
- Route: 60, 65

Operation
- Work began: 1991
- Opened: 1996
- Operator: Vegagerðin
- Traffic: Automotive
- Vehicles per day: 700

Technical
- Length: 9.120 km (5.667 mi)
- No. of lanes: 1-2

Vestfjarðagöng (Icelandic pronunciation: [ˈvɛstˌfjarðaˌkœyŋk], regionally also [-ˌkœŋk], lit. 'Westfjords Tunnel') is the longest tunnel in Iceland, located in Westfjords in northwestern Iceland. It has a length of 9.1 km (6 mi) and was opened in September 1996.

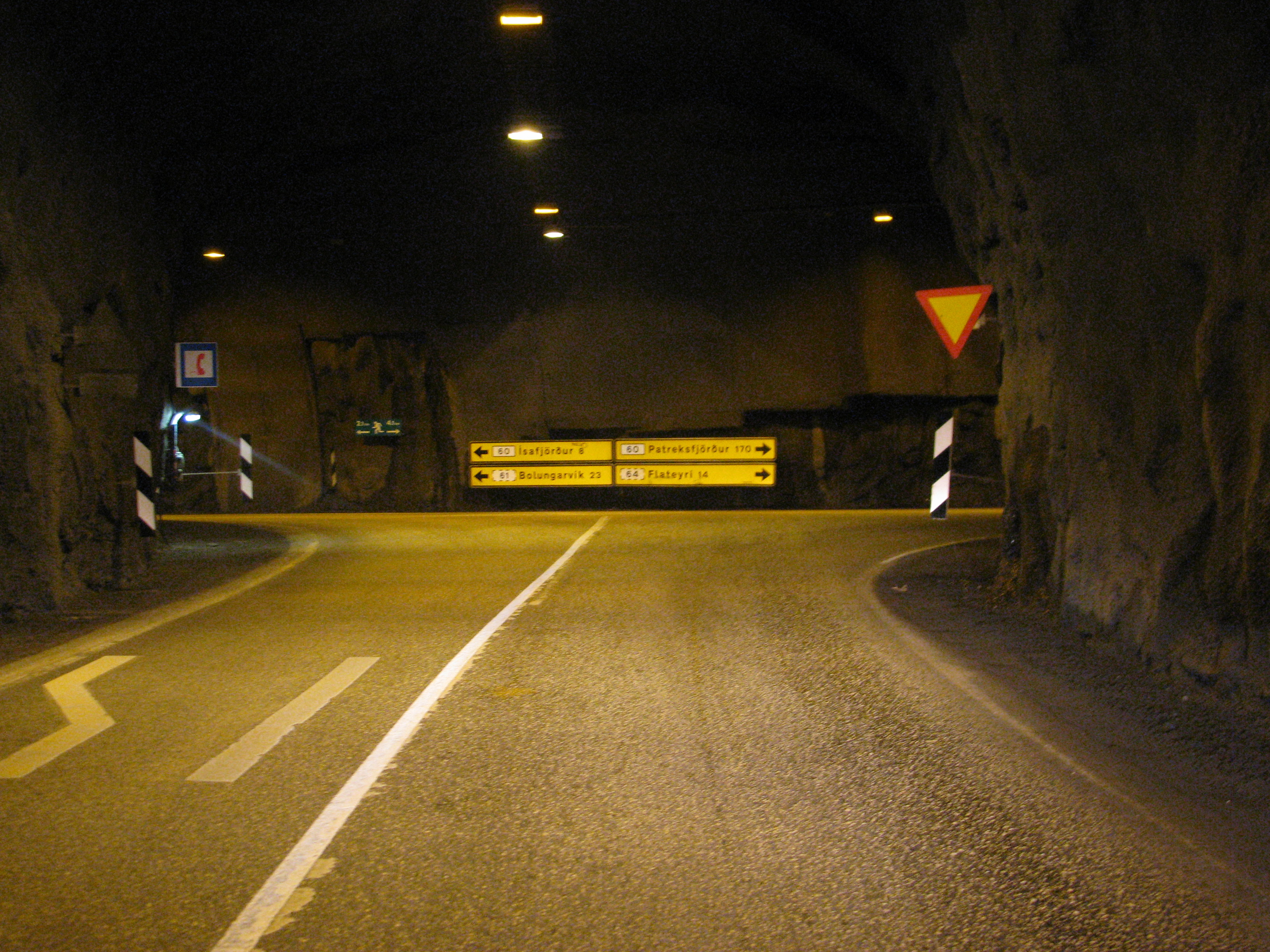
Junction at the core of the tunnel.

The tunnel has three entrances and the three arms meet at junction in the tunnel. The three arms are known as:

- Breiðadalur, 4,150 m (13,615 ft), which gives access to Flateyri and the south-western part of the Westfjords;
- Botnsdalur 2,907 m (9,537 ft), which gives access to the village of Suðureyri to the west, a dead end route;
- Tungudalur 2,103 m (6,900 ft), which gives access to Ísafjörður and the northern part of the Westfjords.

Only the Tungudalur arm has two lanes throughout. Much of the rest of the tunnel has only one lane with passing places, with traffic light control at curved sections to avoid collisions.

The tunnel avoids the Breiðadalsheiði road pass, the summit of which at 610m was formerly the highest pass in regular use in the Westfjords. It was frequently blocked by snow and prone to avalanches.
