= Troja Bridge =

Bridge in Prague

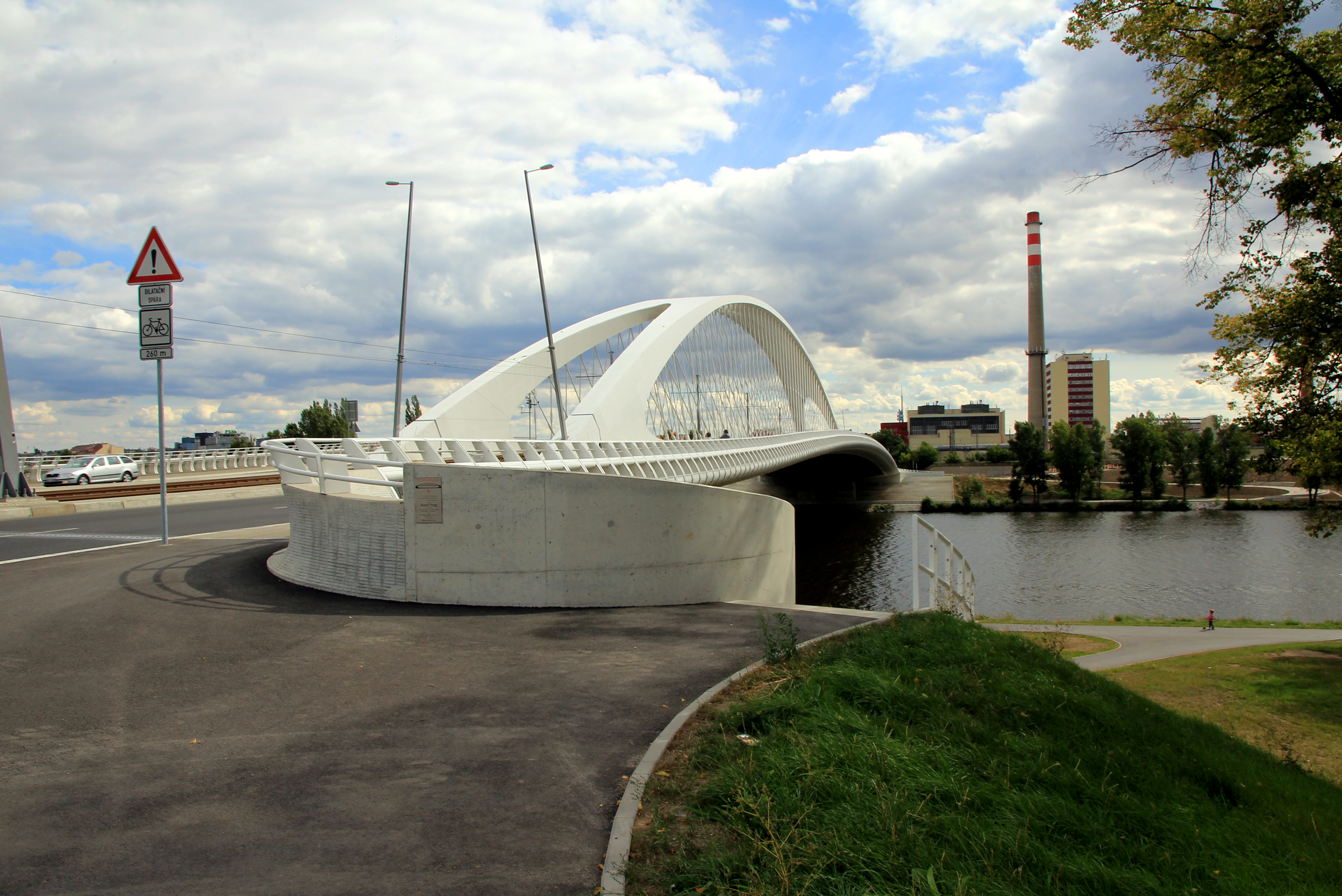
- Coordinates: 50°6′44.1″N 14°26′10.15″E
- Crosses: Vltava River
- Locale: Prague
- Official name: Trojský most

Characteristics
- Design: Bowstring arch bridge
- Total length: 262 metres (860 ft)
- Longest span: 200.4 metres (657 ft)

History
- Architect: Koucky Architects
- Designer: Mott MacDonald
- Constructed by: Metrostav
- Construction end: 2014
- Opened: October 2014

Location
- Interactive map of Troja Bridge

The Troja Bridge (2014) (Czech: Trojský most) is a bowstring arch bridge in Prague that crosses the Vltava river. It opened to traffic in October 2014. The bridge is 262 metres (860 ft) long. It was designed by Mott MacDonald and Koucky Architects, and was constructed by Metrostav. It connects the districts of Troja and Holešovice. The bridge is noted for slender arch and low height-to-span ratio.
