= Arnardalshamar Tunnel =

Tunnel in Iceland

Coordinates: 66°05′30″N 23°00′54″W

Arnardalshamar tunnel
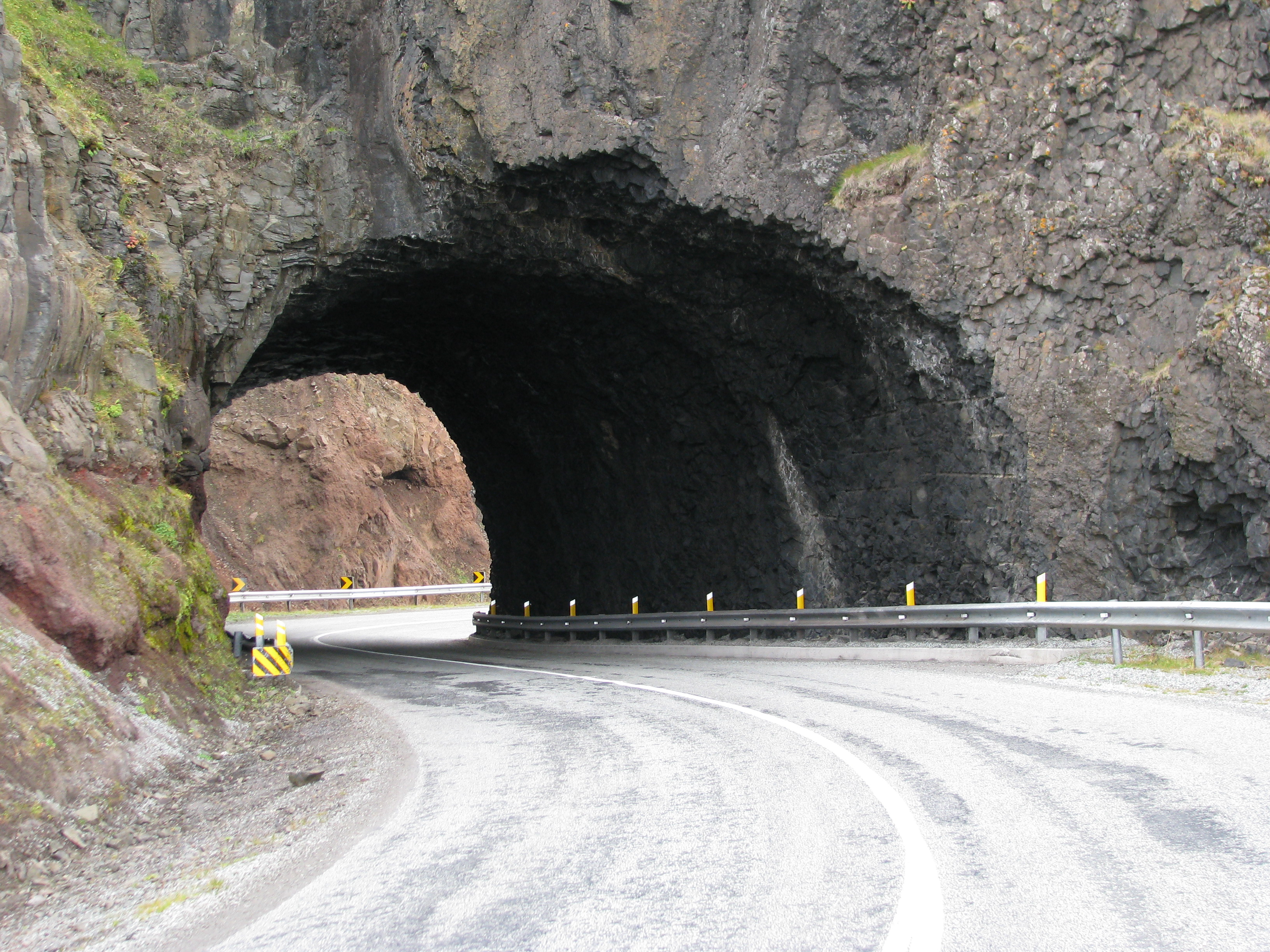
- Interactive map of Arnardalshamar tunnel

Overview
- Other name: Arnarnesgöng
- Location: Westfjords, Iceleand

Operation
- Work began: 1947
- Opened: 1948
- Operator: Icelandic Road Administration

Technical
- Length: 30 m (98 ft)
- No. of lanes: 2

The Arnardalshamar Tunnel is a tunnel in Iceland, located in Westfjords along Route 61. It has a length of 30 m (98 ft) and was opened in 1948. It was the first manmade tunnel in Iceland and it is also the shortest. It cuts through a basalt dike known as Arnardalshamar, between Skutulsfjörður and Álftafjörður. The tunnel was widened to 8.5 m (28 ft) in 1995.
