= Húsavíkurhöfði Tunnel =

Road tunnel in Húsavík, Iceland

Coordinates: 66°03′28″N 17°21′15″W

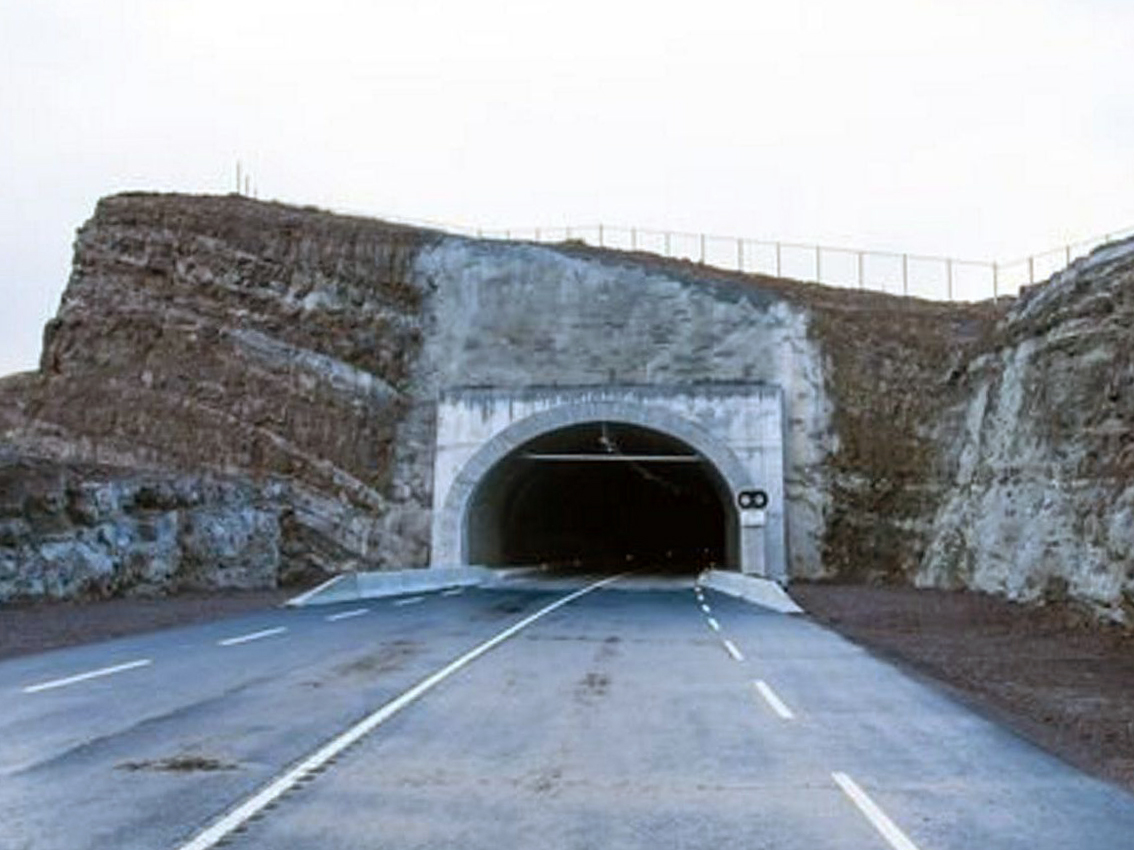
- Interactive map of Húsavíkurhöfði Tunnel

Overview
- Location: Norðurþing, Iceland

Operation
- Work began: 2015
- Opened: 2017
- Operator: Vegagerðin
- Traffic: Automotive; industrial use only

Technical
- Length: 943 m (3,094 ft)
- No. of lanes: 2
- Max elevation: 21 m
- Min elevation: 6 m
- Width: 11 m (36 ft)
- Grade: 1.6%

Húsavíkurhöfði Tunnel (Icelandic: Húsavíkurhöfðagöng, Icelandic pronunciation: [ˈhuːsaˌviːkʏrˌhœvðaˌkœyŋk], regionally also [-viːkʰʏr-]), also known as Bakki Tunnel, is a road tunnel in Húsavík, Iceland. It connects the town's port with a nearby industrial area and is closed to the public.
