= Suðureyri =

- Village
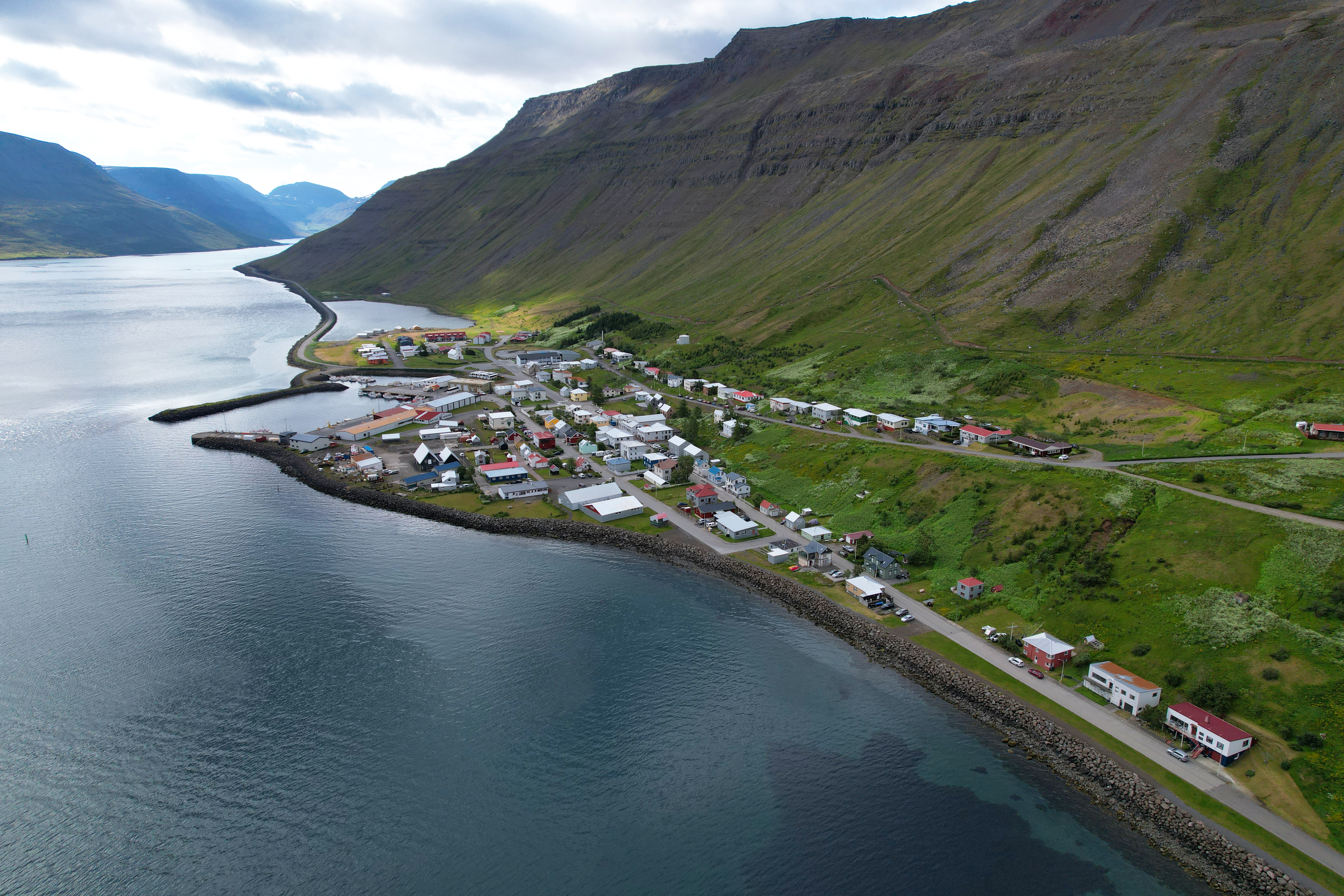
- Suðureyri, 2025

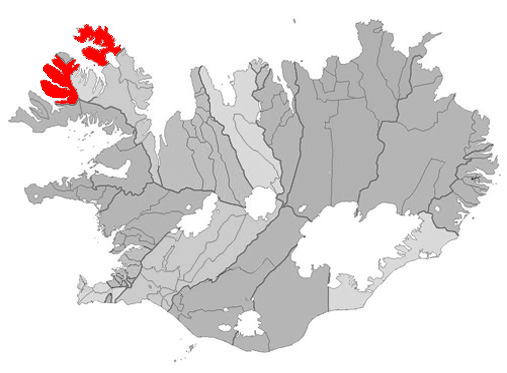
- Location of the Municipality of Ísafjarðarbær

- Location within Iceland
- Coordinates: 66°07′N 23°32′W
- Country: Iceland
- Constituency: Northwest Constituency
- Region: Westfjords
- Municipality: Ísafjarðarbær

Population (1 January 2020)
  - Village: 294
  - Urban: 276
  - Metro: 18
- Time zone: UTC+0 (GMT)
- Póstnúmer: 430, 431

Suðureyri (Icelandic pronunciation: [ˈsʏːðʏrˌeiːrɪ]) is a small Icelandic fishing village perched on the tip of the 13 km-long Súgandafjörður in the Westfjords.

The community was isolated for years by the huge mountains and rough road that led over them. Since 1996, it has been connected to Ísafjörður by a 5 km section of the Vestfjarðagöng (Westfjörds Tunnel).

The village has tours set up to allow visitors to experience traditional Icelandic life firsthand. This includes going out on original fishing boats or visiting the fish factory in town.

Amenities include a geothermal swimming pool, campsite, hotel and a restaurant. The church was built in 1937.

== Climate ==
Climate data for Suðureyri (1961-1988)
Month	Jan	Feb	Mar	Apr	May	Jun	Jul	Aug	Sep	Oct	Nov	Dec	Year
Record high °C (°F)	12.0 (53.6)	12.5 (54.5)	11.7 (53.1)	14.2 (57.6)	17.5 (63.5)	20.0 (68.0)	24.5 (76.1)	22.0 (71.6)	17.6 (63.7)	15.0 (59.0)	13.3 (55.9)	15.0 (59.0)	24.5 (76.1)
Mean daily maximum °C (°F)	1.4 (34.5)	2.0 (35.6)	1.3 (34.3)	3.9 (39.0)	7.4 (45.3)	10.7 (51.3)	12.5 (54.5)	12.1 (53.8)	8.5 (47.3)	5.7 (42.3)	3.1 (37.6)	1.7 (35.1)	5.9 (42.6)
Daily mean °C (°F)	−0.9 (30.4)	−0.4 (31.3)	−1.1 (30.0)	1.5 (34.7)	5.0 (41.0)	8.1 (46.6)	10.0 (50.0)	9.5 (49.1)	6.4 (43.5)	3.6 (38.5)	0.8 (33.4)	−0.7 (30.7)	3.5 (38.3)
Mean daily minimum °C (°F)	−3.6 (25.5)	−3.2 (26.2)	−3.8 (25.2)	−1.4 (29.5)	2.2 (36.0)	5.4 (41.7)	7.3 (45.1)	7.1 (44.8)	4.2 (39.6)	1.5 (34.7)	−1.6 (29.1)	−3.3 (26.1)	0.9 (33.6)
Record low °C (°F)	−16.5 (2.3)	−16.6 (2.1)	−19.5 (−3.1)	−17.5 (0.5)	−7.7 (18.1)	−2.3 (27.9)	1.0 (33.8)	−1.0 (30.2)	−3.4 (25.9)	−8.9 (16.0)	−11.7 (10.9)	−14.2 (6.4)	−19.5 (−3.1)
Average precipitation mm (inches)	127.4 (5.02)	104.5 (4.11)	107.4 (4.23)	71.3 (2.81)	35.4 (1.39)	43.3 (1.70)	48.2 (1.90)	68.3 (2.69)	102.8 (4.05)	146.8 (5.78)	159.3 (6.27)	126.3 (4.97)	1,141 (44.92)
Average precipitation days (≥ 0.1 mm)	23.7	21.0	23.9	20.0	15.4	16.1	15.1	17.0	20.1	24.5	23.7	24.5	245
Source 1: Icelandic Met Office
Source 2: Icelandic Met Office (precipitation days 1961-90 for Galtarviti-4 km (2.5 mi) from Suðureyri); As Galtarviti gets nearly 70 millimetres (3 in) more precipitation than Suðureyri, there might be a significant difference in days with precipitation between them.
