= Siglufjörður =

- Town
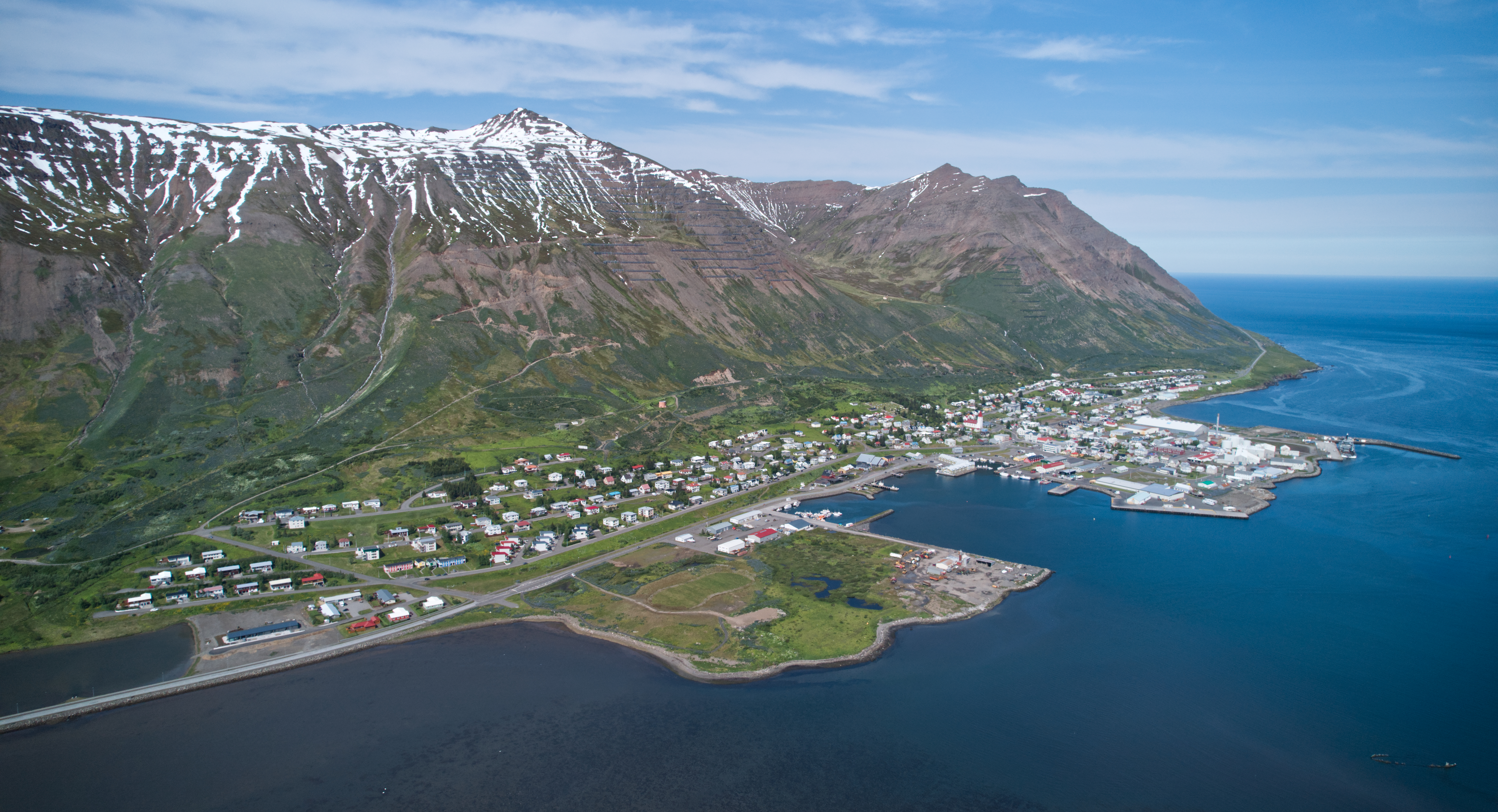
- Siglufjörður
- Nicknames: "Síldarbærinn" (Herring Town), Sigló'
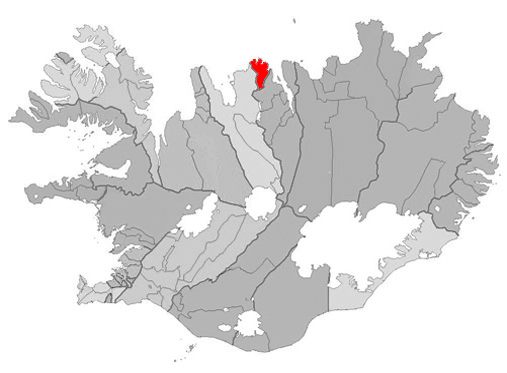
- Location of the Municipality of Fjallabyggð

- Location within Iceland
- Coordinates: 66°9′7″N 18°54′32″W
- Country: Iceland
- Constituency: Northeast Constituency
- Region: Northeastern Region
- Municipality: Fjallabyggð

Area
  - Total: 155 km^{2} (60 sq mi)

Population (January 2025)
  - Total: 1,164
  - Density: 9.28/km^{2} (24.0/sq mi)
- Postal code: 580
- Website: Municipal website

Siglufjörður
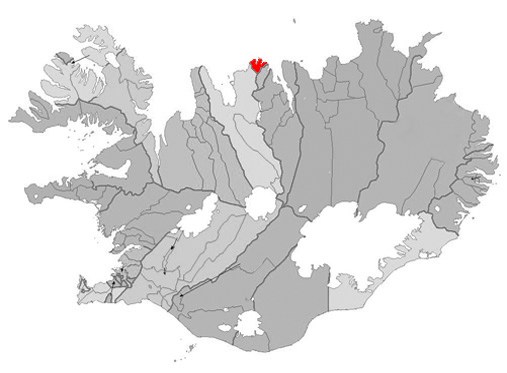
- Location of the former Municipality of Siglufjörður
- Coordinates: 66°11′N 18°53′W
- Country: Iceland

Siglufjörður (Icelandic pronunciation: [ˈsɪklʏˌfjœrðʏr̥]) is a small fishing town in a narrow fjord with the same name on the northern coast of Iceland.

The population in 2011 was 1,206; the town has been shrinking in size since the 1950s when the town reached its peak of 3,000 inhabitants.

The municipalities of Ólafsfjörður and Siglufjörður, connected since 2010 by the Héðinsfjörður Tunnels, merged in 2006 to form a municipality called Fjallabyggð, which literally means Mountain Settlement.

Siglufjörður is the site of The Herring Era Museum, a maritime museum which opened in 1994.

== History ==
The town grew up around the herring industry, which was very strong in the 1940s and 1950s. The first Icelandic Municipal Savings Bank was founded in Siglufjörður in 1873, and on 22 October 1918 Siglufjörður attained municipal status (Icelandic: kaupstaðarréttindi) with the rights and privileges of a town. The number of inhabitants amounted to 146 in 1901 and to 415 in 1910, 1,159 in 1920, 2,022 in 1930, 2,884 in 1940, 3,015 in 1950, 2,860 in 1960, 2,161 in 1970 and 2,047 in 1979. In 1989 Siglufjörður had 1,806 inhabitants. Herring fishing declined considerably after 1970 and the herring processing plants were closed. Many people left the area. Today the town remains dependent on fishing industries. The government of Iceland is attempting to reverse the population decline in the area by improving land transport and by promoting tourism. Today herring fishing is no longer productive in the region.

== Sights and cultural events ==
Siglufjörður is famous for its Herring Festival (Síldarævintýrið, [ˈsiltarˌaiːvɪnˌtʰiːrɪθ]) which is held every year in August, and for its Herring Museum (Síldarminjasafn [ˈsiltarˌmɪnjaˌsapn̥]) which can be visited in Róaldsbakki [ˈrouːˌal(t)sˌpahcɪ], a historic building dating from 1907.

Þjóðlagahátíðin á Siglufirði [ˈθjouðˌlaːɣaˌhauːˌtʰiːðɪn au ˈsɪklʏˌfɪrðɪ] is a music festival which is held every year in July. The town is famous for Bjarni Þorsteinsson (1861–1938), a composer and priest who lived in Siglufjörður from 1888 on. He collected many old folk songs which had nearly been forgotten and published them again between 1906 and 1909. The oldest house in town dating from 1884 was transformed into a Bjarni þorsteinsson Museum referring to traditional Icelandic folk music and to historical musical instruments.

Siglufjarðarkirkja [ˈsɪklʏˌfjarðarˌcʰɪr̥ca], a Protestant church consecrated in 1932, has 400 seats. With a length of 35 metres and a breadth of 12 metres, it is comparatively large. The two large clocks on its tower, which is 30 metres in height, were donated by the Savings Bank in 1932. Inside the church there is a sightworthy altar painting dating from 1726 which shows the Last Supper. The colourful church windows were created by the German artist Maria Katzgrau (1913–1998) and added in 1974. Ragnar Kjartansson, an Icelandic artist, created the tall sculpture Síldveiði [ˈsiltˌveiːðɪ] (Herring Fishing) which can be seen in front of the church. Lífsbjórg [ˈlifsˌpjourk], another sightworthy memorial which was unveiled close to the harbour in 1988, refers to 62 seamen from Siglufjörður who lost their lives on sea between 1900 and 1988.

One of the oldest buildings in town is Sæbyhús, a wooden house which was built in 1886 and enlarged in 1915.

Norska sjómannaheimilið is a large wooden residential building which was built in 1915 for Norwegian seamen working in Siglufjörður. It was also used as a medical center for injured and sick seamen. The wood had been prepared in Haugesund in Norway before the construction. Today the building which was renovated 1986-1986 is used as a conservatoire.

== Current ==
The dual Héðinsfjörður Tunnels, with a total length of 11 km (6.8 mi), were dug between Siglufjörður and Ólafsfjörður to connect with the region of Eyjafjörður in the east, and opened on 2 October 2010. Siglufjörður was already connected by the 800 m tunnel Strákagöng to the west; it used to be the town's only road connection open year-round. That tunnel was completed in 1967 and before then the only road to the town was a narrow mountain pass between Siglufjörður and Héðinsfjörður, open only during the summer. The new tunnel opened interesting mountain tracks and trout fishing opportunities to those without boats and unwilling to walk the old trail.

== Sports ==
The old road to Siglufjörður is open during the summer. It is the highest mountain road in Iceland and is used today for hiking, horse riding and pleasure driving. Siglufjörður has developed into the Icelandic centre of winter sports. There are two ski lifts and a ski jump hill. In January 2021, the ski area of Siglufjörður was destroyed by a snowslide.

== In popular culture ==
Baltasar Kormákur's 2015 TV series Ófærð (Trapped) was filmed almost entirely in Siglufjörður, with the exception of a few outdoor scenes shot in the Eastfjords and Reykjavík.

The town is also the setting of Ragnar Jónasson's detective series entitled Dark Iceland.

The new hotel at Siglufjörður

== Traffic connections ==
Siglufjörður was connected by road for the first time in 1940, when the horse-riding trail through Siglufjarðarskarð [ˈsɪklʏˌfjarðarˌskarθ] was improved, enabling cars to get through. Before that ships, seaplanes, horses and walking provided transport.

Siglufjörður has a small airfield, Siglufjörður Airport. However there have been no regular flights to Siglufjörður for many years, but small private planes make frequent landings. The closest airport with scheduled flights is in Akureyri, an hour's drive from Siglufjörður.

== Daylight hours ==
Siglufjörður experiences midnight sun from 9 June until 1 July.

Siglufjörður does not experience polar night at the December solstice; the shortest daylight hours in Siglufjörður are 2 hours 39 minutes, from 11:54 UTC until 14:33 UTC on 21 December.

== Gallery ==
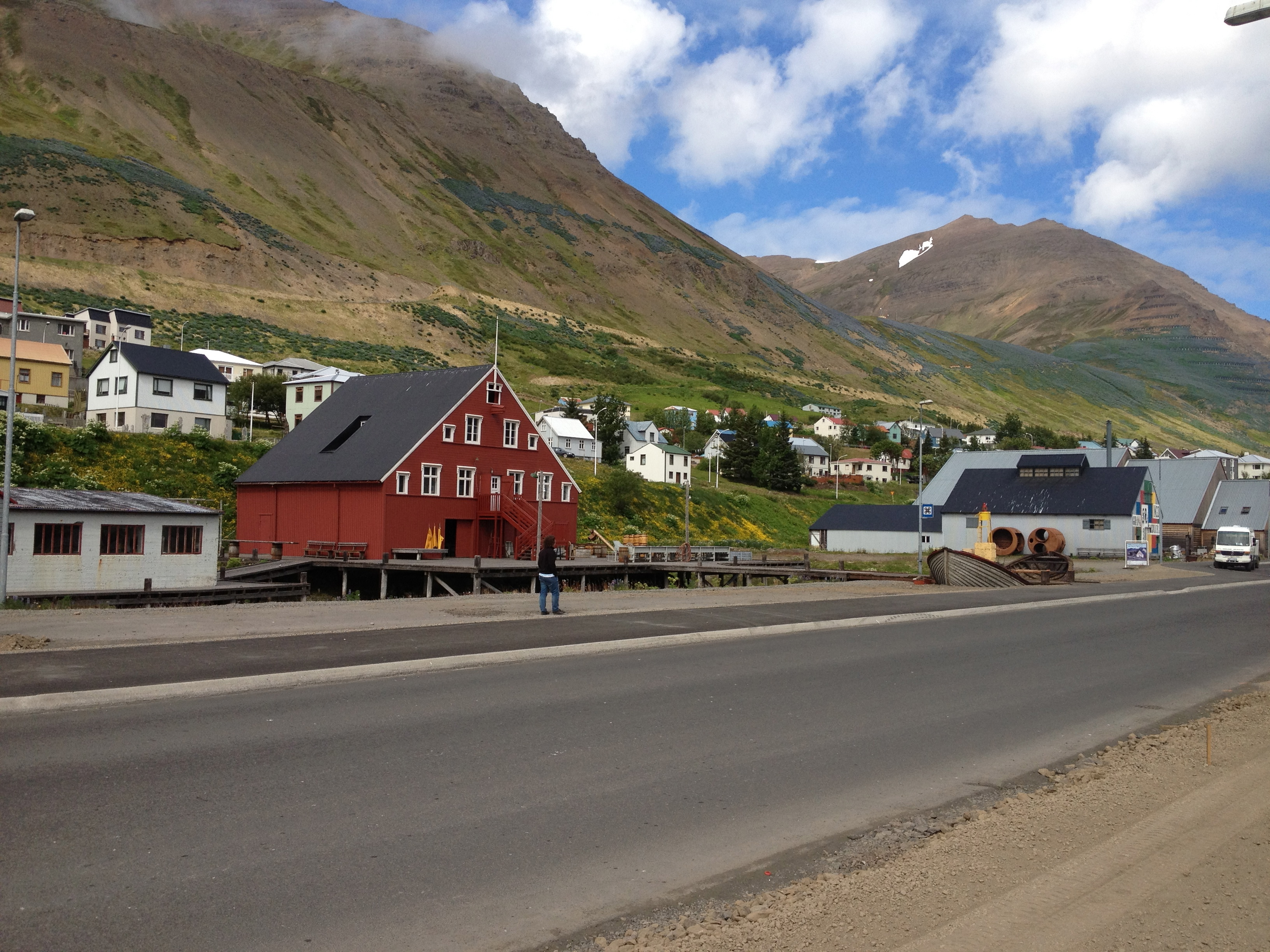
Siglufjörður

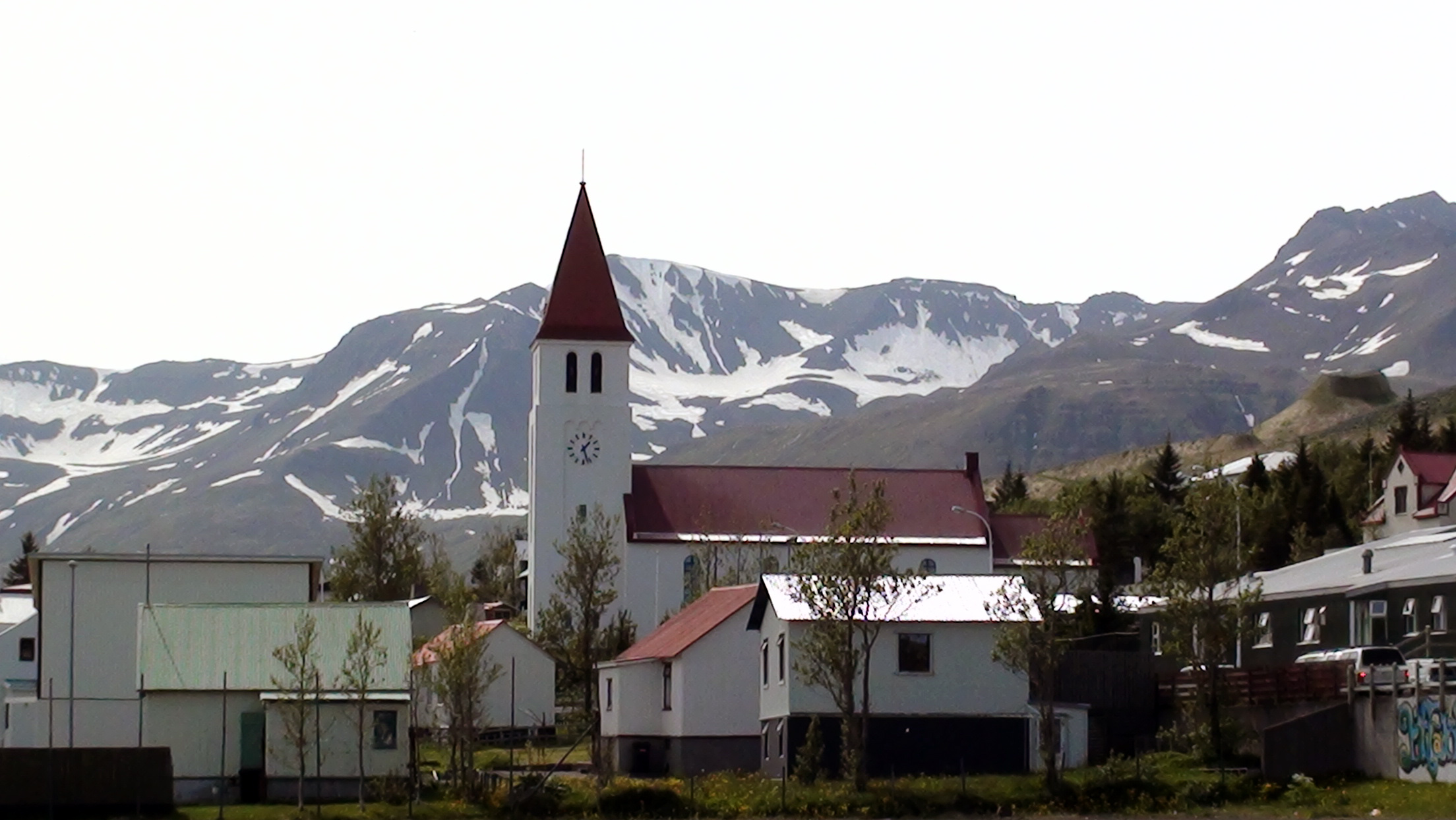
Church

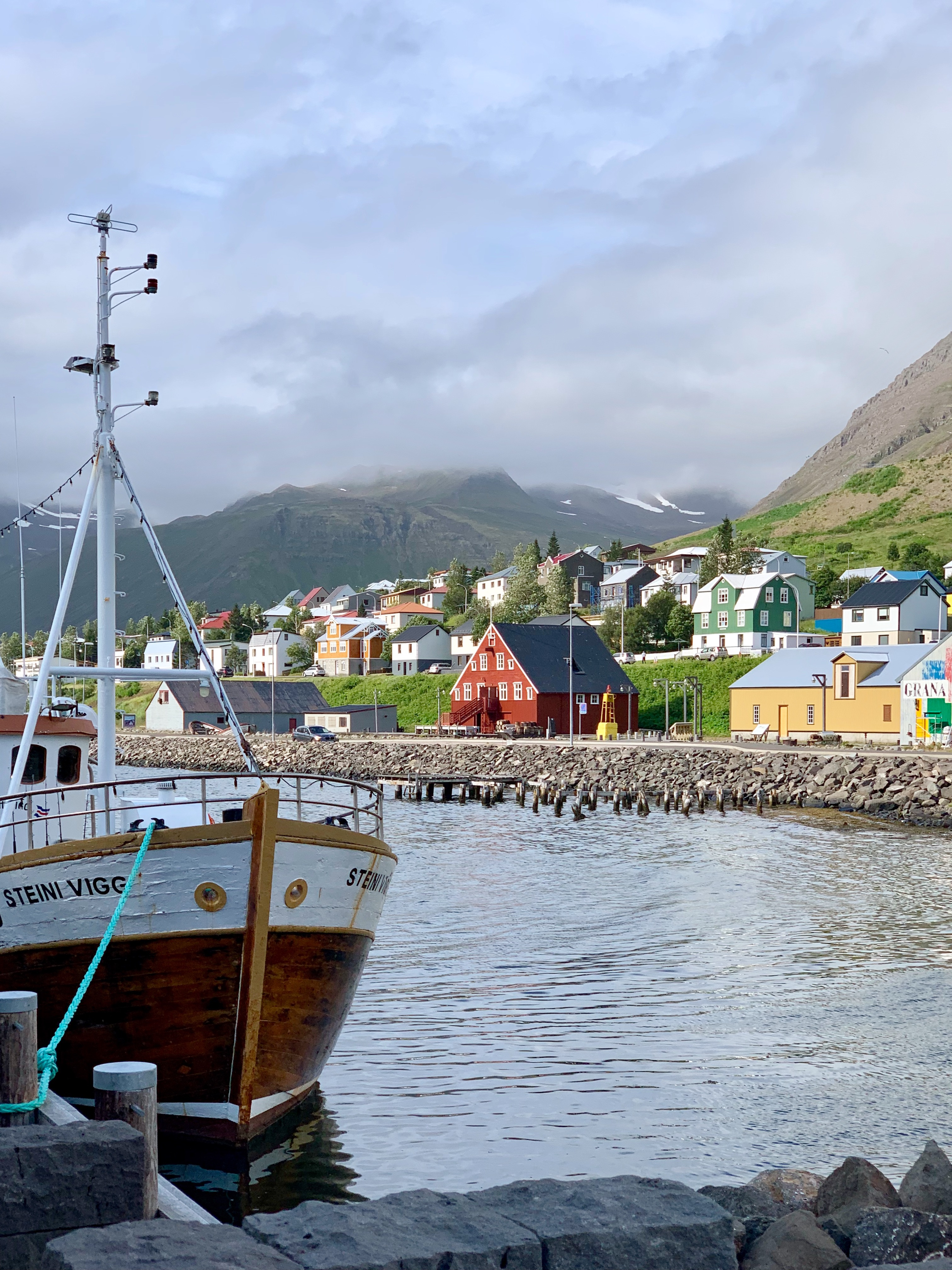
Houses in Siglufjörður: The red building is the Herring Museum.

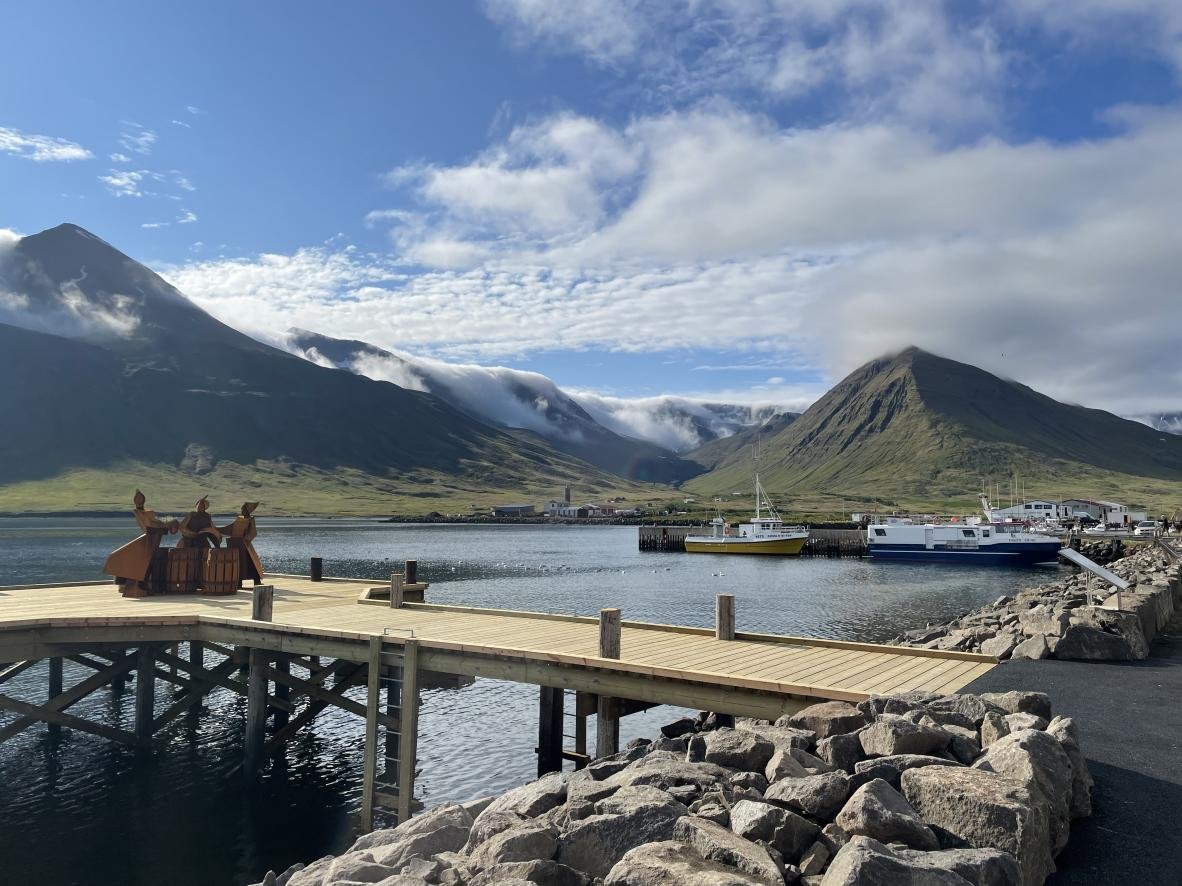
Pier at Siglufjörður overlooking the coast
