= Héðinsfjarðargöng =

Road tunnels in Iceland

Coordinates: 66°05′38″N 18°47′50″W

Héðinsfjörður Tunnel Héðinsfjarðargöng
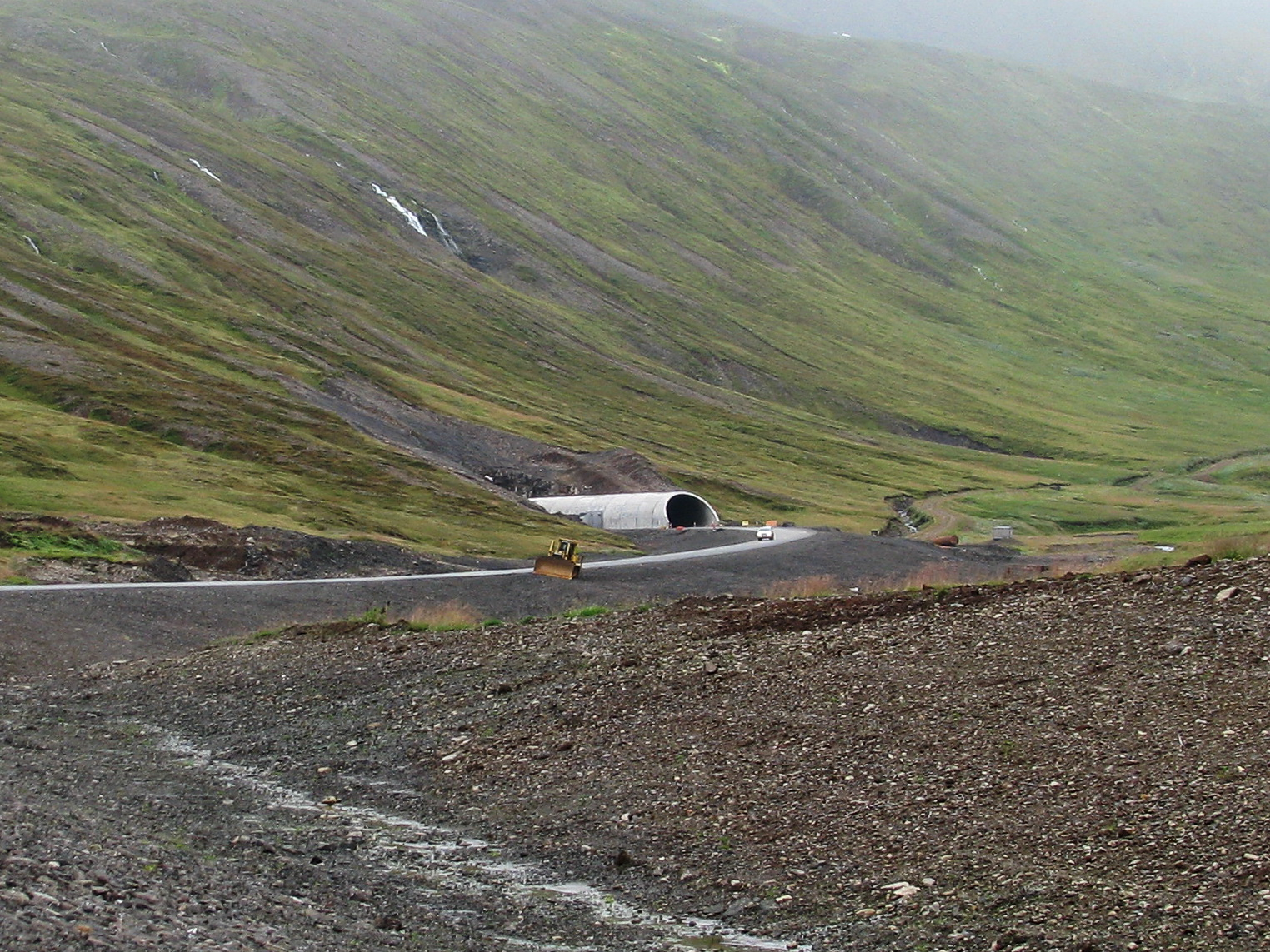
- Siglufjörður entrance
- Interactive map of Héðinsfjörður Tunnel; Héðinsfjarðargöng

Overview
- Location: Links Ólafsfjörður and Siglufjörður, Iceland
- Route: 76

Operation
- Work began: 2006
- Opened: 2010
- Owner: Vegagerðin
- Traffic: Automotive
- Character: Passenger
- Vehicles per day: Summer: 940 Winter: 520 (2022)

Technical
- Length: 6.9 km (4.3 mi) (southern tunnel), 3.7 km (2.3 mi) (northern tunnel)
- No. of lanes: 2
- Max elevation: 60 m (200 ft) (southern tunnel), 73 m (240 ft) (northern tunnel)
- Min elevation: 6 m (20 ft) (southern tunnel), 12 m (39 ft) (northern tunnel)
- Width: 7.6 m (25 ft)
- Grade: 3%

Héðinsfjarðargöng (Icelandic pronunciation: [ˈçɛːðɪnsˌfjarðarˌkœyŋk], lit. 'Héðinsfjörður Tunnel') are two road tunnels in northern Iceland, connecting Ólafsfjörður and Siglufjörður. They were opened on October 2, 2010. The total cost was around ISK 12 billion ($106 million).

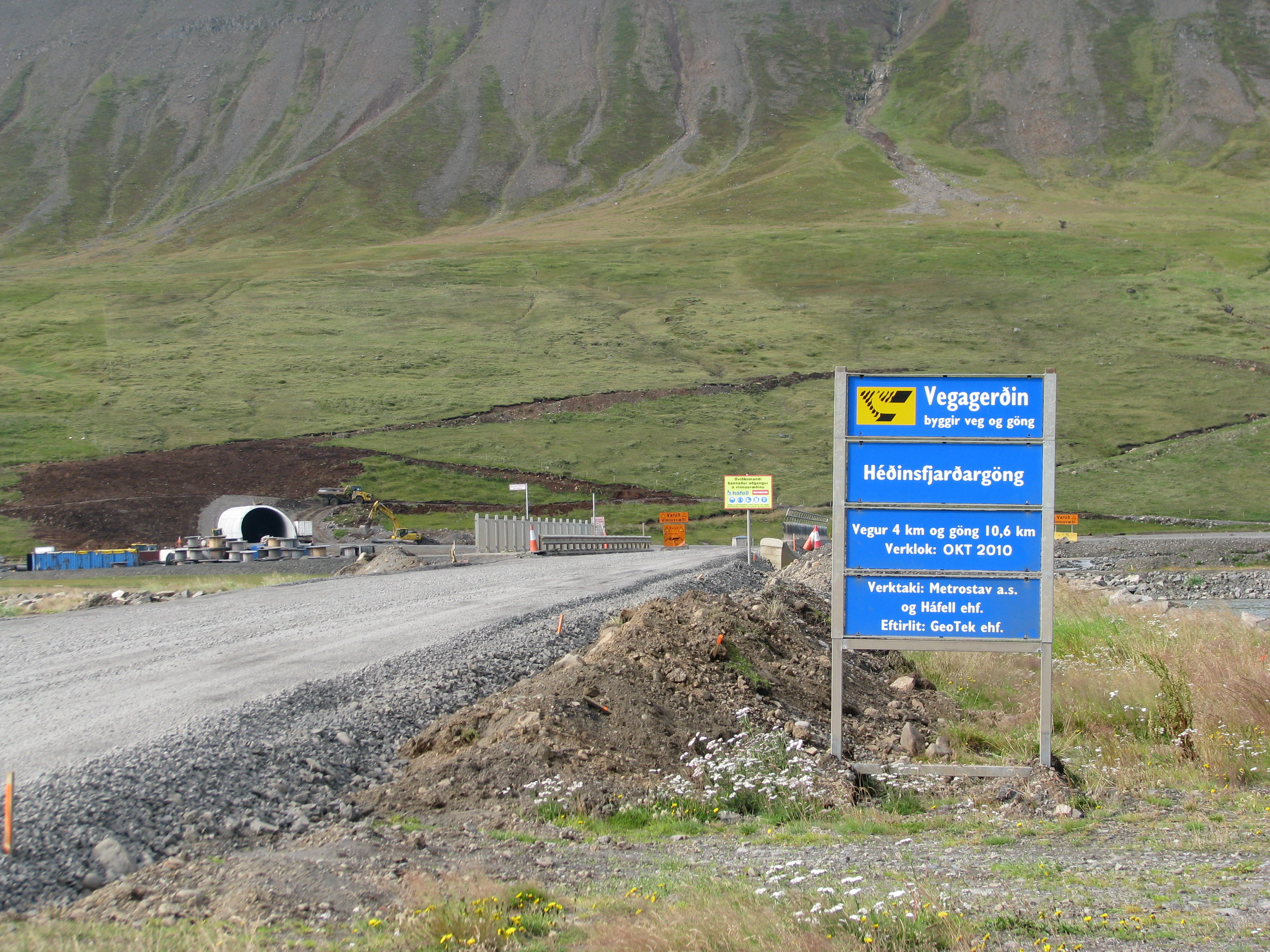
Ólafsfjörður entrance during contstruction, 2010

== Social, economic and cultural impact of the tunnels ==
In 2008, a seven-year research project was initiated to evaluate the social, economic, and cultural impact of the Héðinsfjörður tunnels. The project was directed by Professor Thoroddur Bjarnason and implemented by a research team at the University of Akureyri.

The results showed the tunnel traffic was above expectations. There is considerable commuting between Ólafsfjörður and Siglufjörður, and the vast majority of residents travel between them for shopping, services, events, and social participation. The regional economy has been strengthened, and satisfaction with prices and diversity of goods and services has increased. Siglufjörður has become part of the Eyjafjörður tourism region and a destination for tourists between Akureyri and the Reykjavík capital region.

There has not been an increase in the number of overnight stays, and the predicted tourism circle around the Tröllaskagi peninsula has not materialized. The services of state and municipality have been reduced, in part as result of the economic crisis of 2008. Residents are more satisfied with their educational opportunities but less satisfied with policing and access to health services. Tensions between residents of the two towns do not appear to have increased, even though Ólafsfjörður residents tend to think that they do not receive their fair share in public services. A population increase has been observed in Siglufjörður, while population decline appears to have been halted in Ólafsfjörður. There has in particular been an increase in the number of younger women, young children, and foreign citizens, and young people are more likely to expect to stay in their home community.
