= Oddskarðsgöng =

Tunnel in Iceland

Coordinates: 65.0705°N 13.8909°W

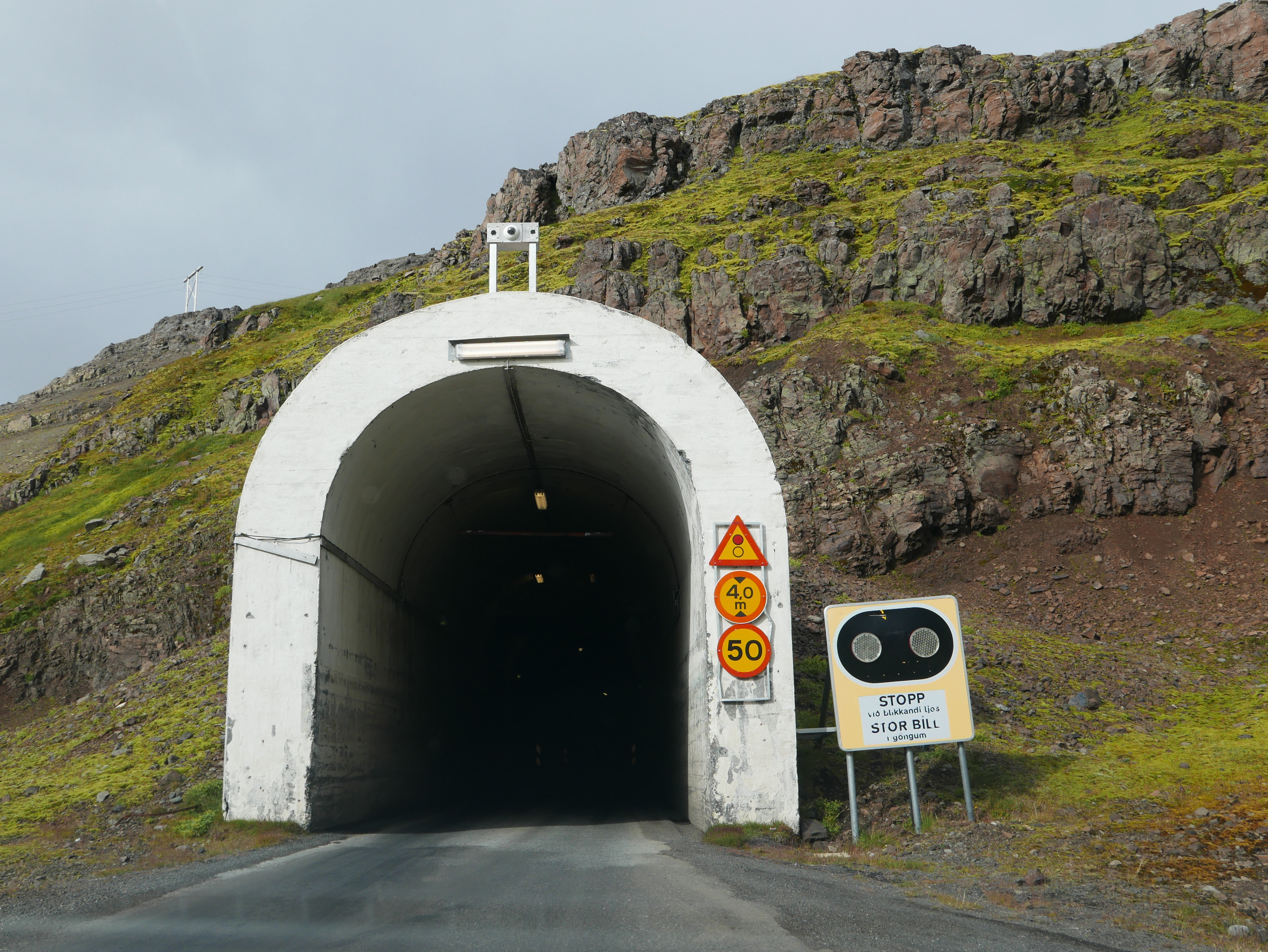
The Oddsskarðgöng Tunnel

Oddskarðsgöng (Icelandic pronunciation: [ˈɔtsˌskarðsˌkœyŋk], lit. 'Oddsskarð Tunnel') is a disused road tunnel in Iceland, located in the Eastern Region along Route 92. It is 640 m (2,100 ft) long and was opened in 1977.

Oddsskarðsgöng was replaced in 2017 by the Norðfjarðargöng tunnel and subsequently closed to general traffic.

It was the third motor vehicle tunnel constructed in the country preceded only by Arnarnesgöng in the northwest and Strákagöng in the mid-north.

It was one lane wide with stopping places for passing traffic.
