= Norðfjarðargöng =

Tunnel in Eastern Region, Iceland

Coordinates: 65.0883°N 14.0589°W

Northfjords Tunnel
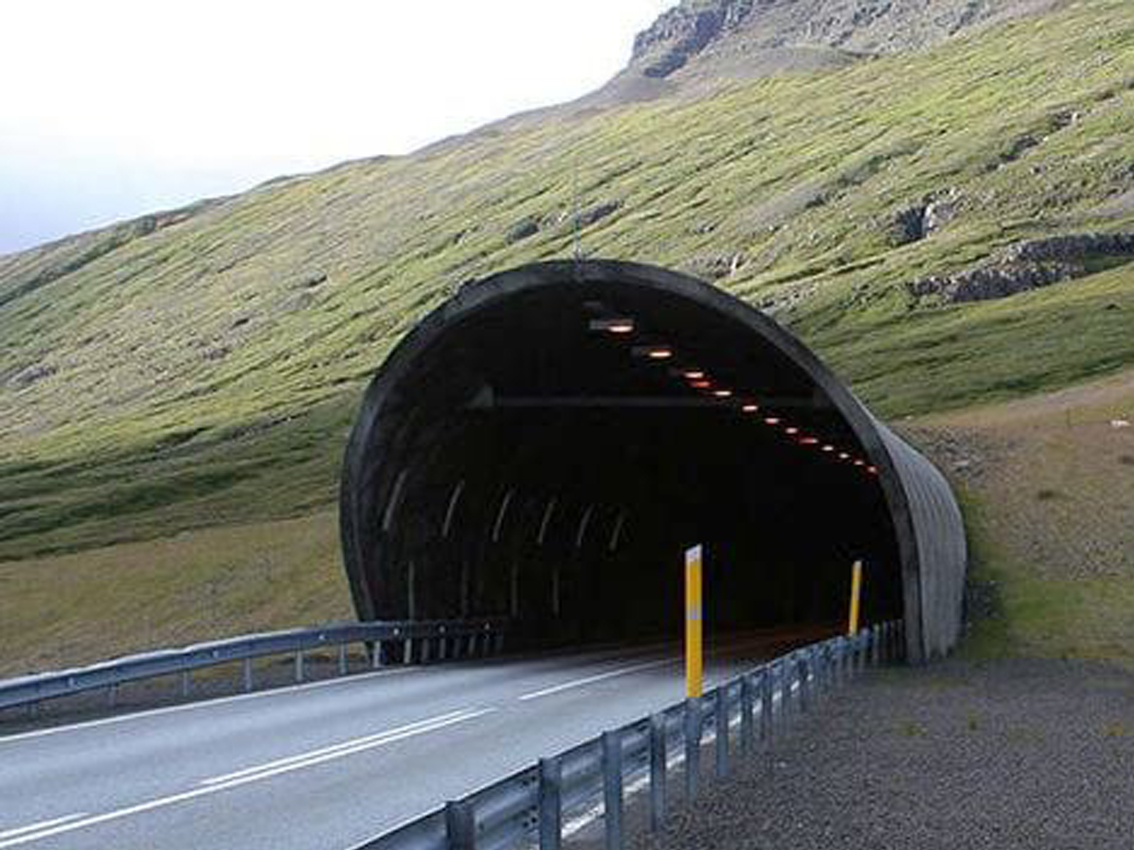
- Interactive map of Northfjords Tunnel

Overview
- Location: Fjarðabyggð, Iceland
- Route: 92

Operation
- Work began: 11 November 2013
- Opened: 11 November 2017
- Operator: Vegagerðin
- Traffic: Automotive

Norðfjarðargöng (Icelandic pronunciation: [ˈnɔrðˌfjarðarˌkœyŋk], lit. 'Northfjord Tunnel') is a tunnel in Iceland, located in Eastern Region along Route 92. It has a length of 7,542 m (24,744 ft) and was originally due to be completed in 2014. After delays, prompting protests by residents of the area, it opened on 11 November 2017. Norðfjarðargöng connects the communities of Neskaupstaður and Eskifjörður, replacing the Oddsskarðsgöng tunnel.
