= Fjallabyggð =

Coordinates: 66.152°N 18.909°W

- Municipality
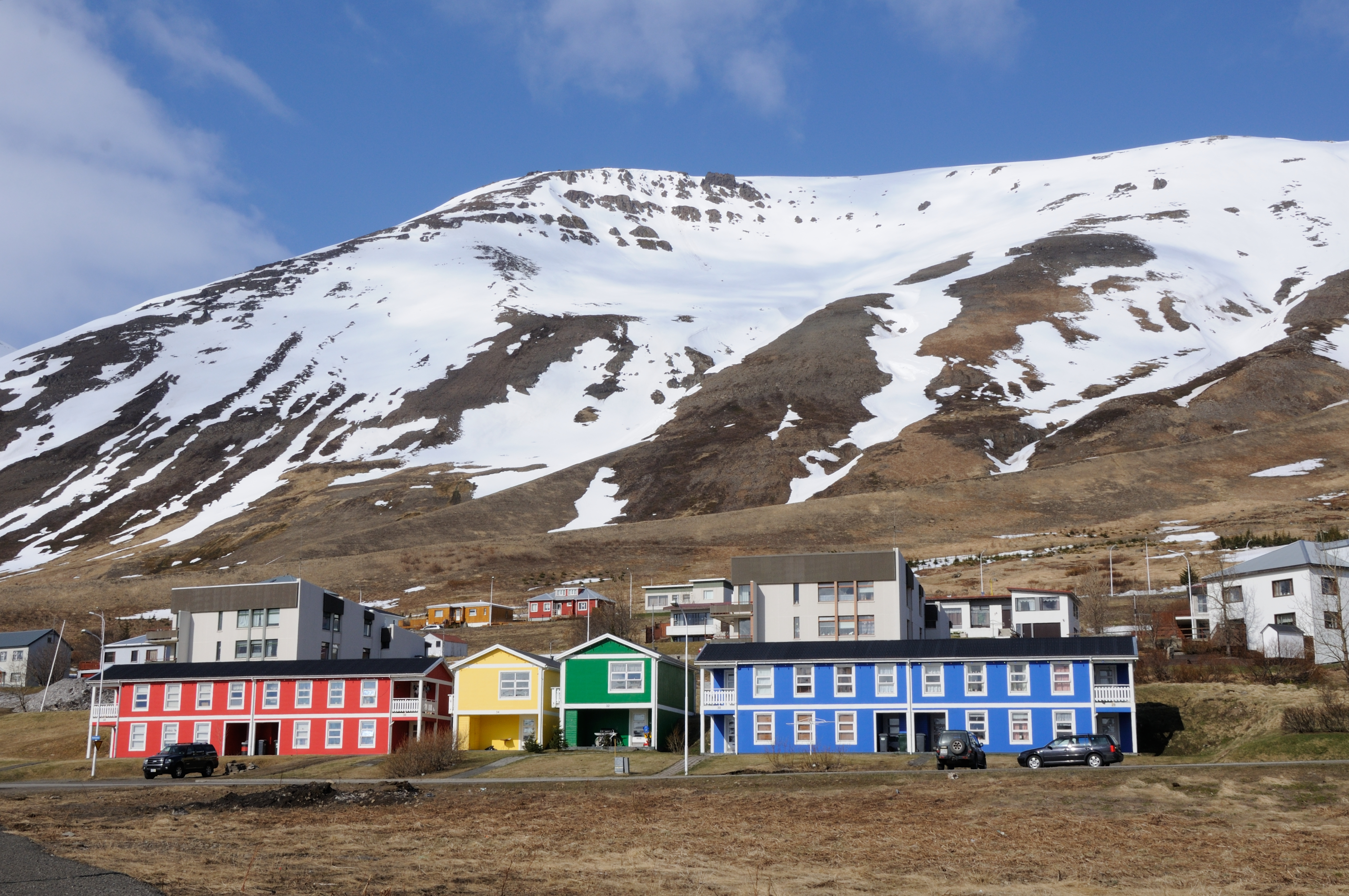
- Siglufjörður, one of the component settlements of Fjallabyggð

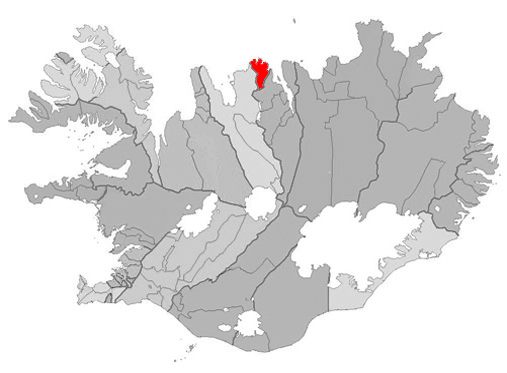
- Location of the municipality

- Location within Iceland
- Country: Iceland
- Region: Northeastern Region
- Constituency: Northeast Constituency

Government
  - Mayor: Gunnar Ingi Birgisson

Area
  - Total: 364 km^{2} (141 sq mi)

Population
  - Total: 2,010
  - Density: 5.52/km^{2} (14.3/sq mi)
- Postal code(s): 580, 625
- Municipal number: 6250
- Website: fjallabyggd.is

Fjallabyggð (Icelandic pronunciation: [ˈfjatlaˌpɪɣθ]) is a municipality located in northern Iceland. The former municipalities of Ólafsfjörður and Siglufjörður joined to form it in 2006.
