= Icelandic Road Administration =

Government agency

Icelandic Road and Coastal Administration
- Vegagerðin
- Logo of the Road Administration

Agency overview
- Type: Government agency
- Jurisdiction: Iceland
- Headquarters: Garðabær, Iceland; 64.0799°N 21.9299°W
- Employees: 360 (2023)
- Minister responsible: Eyjólfur Ármannsson, Minister of Infrastructure
- Agency executive: Bergþóra Þorkelsdóttir, Director
- Website: road.is (in English) vegagerdin.is (in Icelandic)

The Icelandic Road and Coastal Administration (Icelandic: Vegagerðin [ˈvɛːɣaˌcɛrðɪn]) is a government agency in Iceland which has legal ownership and responsibility over construction, management and maintenance of highways (including major urban highways), minor roads and harbours. It is part of the Ministry of Infrastructure and was established in 1918.

== History ==
=== Until the 20th century ===
Until the 18th century there were no official roads in Iceland, only paths and barely visible tracks which people followed with the help of cairns for a few kilometers in either direction. In the 19th century, when fishing villages began to spring up on the coasts and infrastructure between farms and villages began to improve. Fishermen's camps developed into villages, with homes and workshops, they also became important trading posts for the farms around them.

Farmers traveled to the villages with their raw materials and traded these for imported goods, mostly Danes. This was, of course, not a new thing in Iceland. These places had long been sites for Danish tradesmen but as these trading posts became villages, communication and infrastructure were bound to improve due to increased traffic. In the 19th century, horse carriages became more common among farmers and by the beginning of the 20th century carriage trail tracks had formed from every village in the countryside.

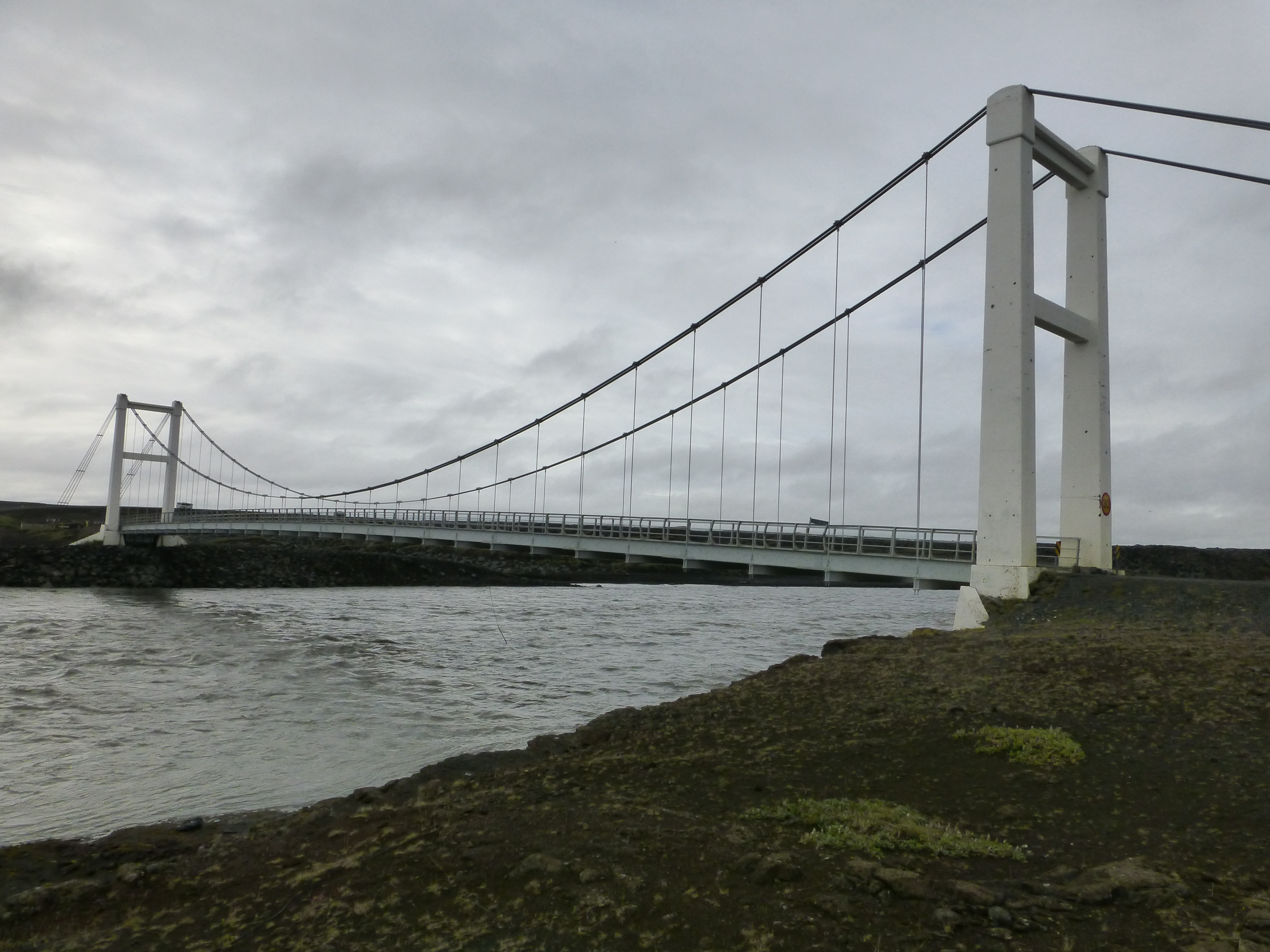
Jökulsá á Fjöllum bridge, constructed in 1947.

=== Early 20th century – 1960 ===
In the early 20th century a few automobiles had come to Iceland and streets had been formed in the largest towns. But roads were needed to connect settlements, and the government called for the old horse tracks to be upgraded to gravel roads. In 1918 the Icelandic government established the offices of Vegamálastjóri (Director of Roads) and Vitamálastjóri (Director of Lighthouses). The latter was an officer overseeing lighthouses and sea transportation and the office of Vegamálastjóri was the predecessor of the Vegagerð Ríkisins institution which was formed a few years later and is now called Vegagerðin.

The history of road construction in Iceland can be divided into two eras: pre-1960 and post-1960. Before 1960 the main concern of the government was to provide road access to all populated areas and to all farms. This was a great task and there was a modest budget. The roads were built by a large human workforce and they were narrow and uneven. The terrain was challenging for the roadbuilders as it is often rough, and most places in the Eastern and Westfjords are surrounded by dominating cliff mountains and headlands.

=== 1960–present ===
In the 1950s and 1960s enormous progress was made in Icelandic infrastructure, in part due to assistance provided by the Marshall Plan. In 1960 it was announced that the task of providing all populated areas road access was completed; the next step was to improve the rudimentary roads, to build bridges and tunnels and to improve road surfaces using asphalt.

At the time, Vegagerðin was a very large vertically organised agency, with large contingent of workers and equipment. In the 1980s and 1990s, the agency's construction operations became largely outsourced and independent contractors became more common in road construction, both in urban and rural areas. Vegagerðin reduced its direct labour workforce and began to rely more and more on private contractors for building roads and other infrastructure.

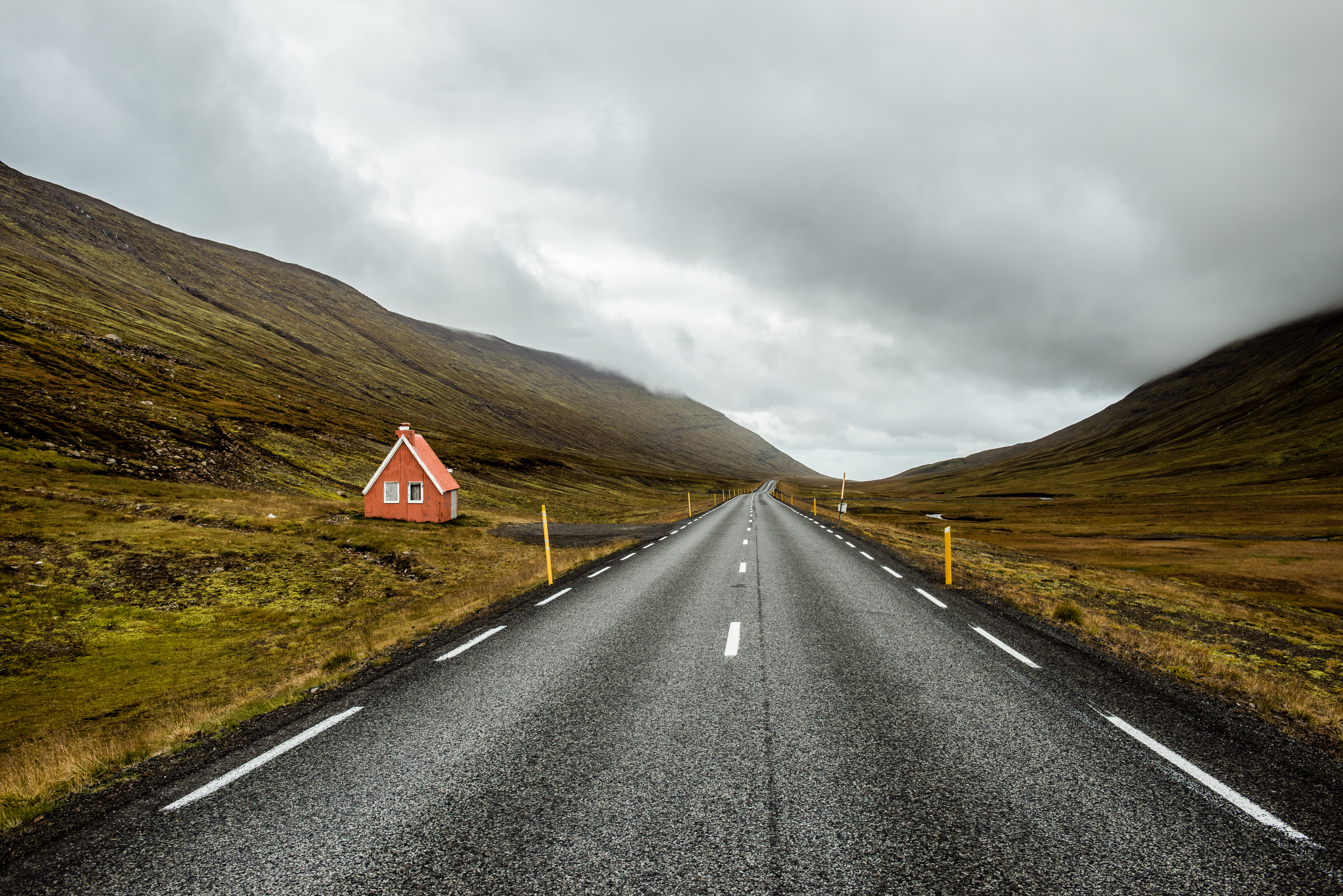
Road in Iceland

Today Vegagerðin has no road building workforce or equipment: the work has been completely privatized. Thus Vegagerðin is the intermediary between the contractors and the government. Although the word vegagerðin means "the road-makers", it is now an administrative organisation which employs mainly office staff, carrying out planning and tendering of new projects and maintenance.

Until 2021, the headquarters of Vegagerðin were in Reykjavík with other sites in Kópavogur and in Hafnarfjörður. In August 2021, all administrative activities were relocated to the new headquarters in Garðabær. It formerly belonged to the Ministry of the Interior, until the ministry was split and reorganised.

== Road administration areas ==
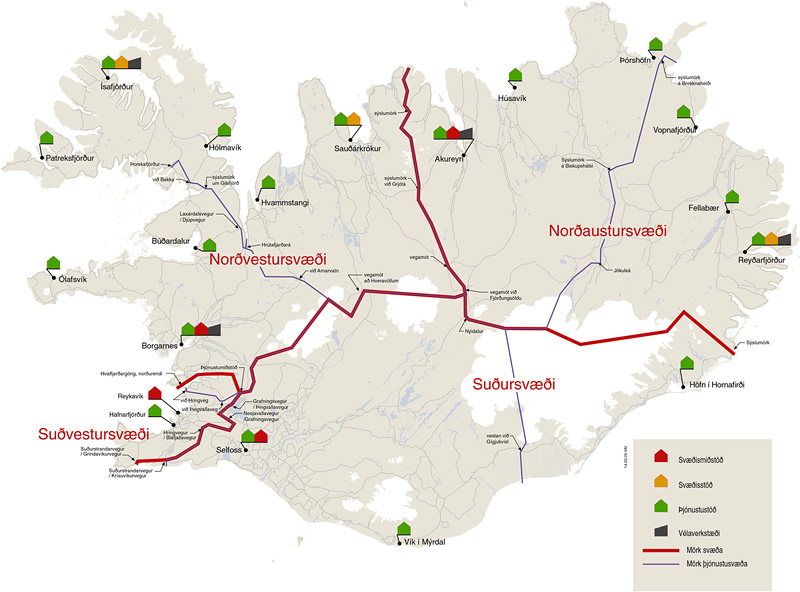
The administrative divisions of the Road Administration

Vegagerðin has its headquarters in Garðabær near the capital, Reykjavík, but its activity in the countryside is controlled from outposts in various towns and the country is divided into four administrative divisions.

Those are South, Southwest, Northwest and Northeast. Each of these is subdivided into two service areas, except for the Southwest area which covers only a small area. That is because it includes the capital, Reykjavík, and has a much denser road network than the other regions. The service area is where the maintenance department of each service facility (which are in various towns and villages) can maintain the road, signs, tunnels etc.
