= F26 =

F26 may refer to:

== Ships ==
- ARV Almirante García (F-26), a Mariscal Sucre-class frigate of the Venezuelan Navy
- HMS Matabele (F26), a Tribal-class destroyer of the Royal Navy
- HMS Maloja (F26), an armed merchant cruiser of the Royal Navy
- HMS Petard (F26), a Type 16 frigate of the Royal Navy
- KD Lekir (F-26), a Kasturi-class corvette of the Royal Malaysian Navy

== Other uses ==
- F-26 (Michigan county highway)
- BMW X4 (F26), a German SUV
- F26A graph, a symmetric graph
- Fluorine-26 (^{26}F), an isotope of fluorine
- Fokker F26, an early Dutch jet airliner design
- Route F26 (Iceland), a highland road in Iceland
