= Grupo VYCEA, Argentine Air Force =

Coordinates: 34°41′05″S 58°44′43″W

Grupo VYCEA is the Spanish acronym for Grupo Vigilancia y Control del Espacio Aéreo (English: Air Space's Surveillance and Control Group). Grupo VYCEA is a group of the Argentine Air Force, headquartered at Parque San Martín, Merlo since 1952.

Grupo VYCEA, or just VYCEA, operates a military radar base that occupies a total area of 240 Ha. The core of the base is a radar RPA-240T from the Argentinian company INVAP installed in 2015. The radar is mounted on the top of a 23 meters high tower and stands above an underground bunker that contains the main control room.

In this room the information captured by military radars deployed along the Argentine border is collected and processed in real time by a recently acquired computerized system.

The group is subordinate to the Air Operations Command (Spanish: Comando de Operaciones Aéreas) and a Commodore commands it (Spanish: Comodoro), a rank equivalent to Group Captain in the RAF and Colonel in the USAF.

In 2009, the government of Spain donated two 3D radars to be mounted in Resistencia, Chaco and Posadas, Misiones. Another seven 3D radars are being built by INVAP.
