= Route 26 (Iceland) =

Road in Iceland

Route 26
- Landvegur
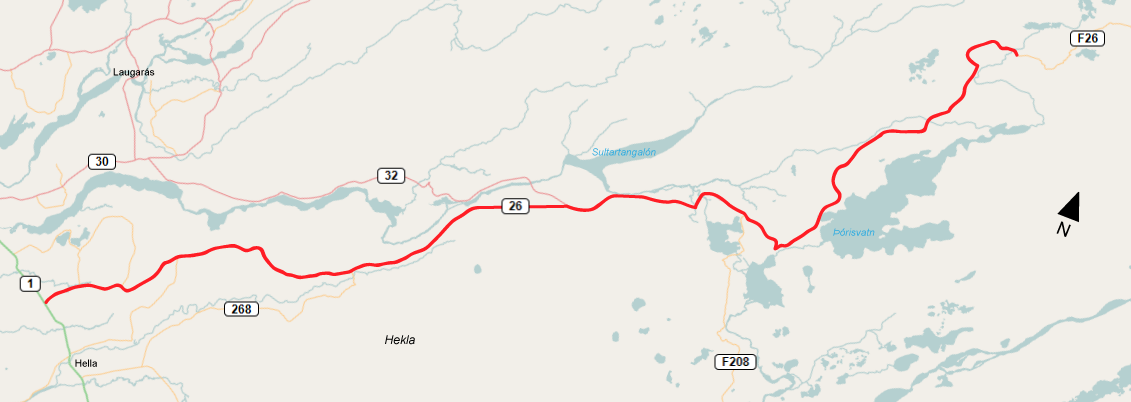
- Location of Route 26

Route information
- Length: 127.7 km (79.3 mi)

Major junctions
- Southern end: Route 1 Suðurlandsvegur
- Route 281 Sumarliðabæjavegur; Route 286 Hagabraut; Route 271 Árbæjarvegur; Route 272 Bjallavegur; Route 268 Þingskálavegur; Route F225 Landmannaleið; Route 32 Þjórsárdalsvegur; Route 208 Fjallabaksleið nyrðri Route F228 Veiðivatnaleið
- Northern end: Route F26 Sprengisandsleið

Location
- Country: Iceland

Highway system
- Roads in Iceland

Landvegur (Icelandic pronunciation: [ˈlantˌvɛːɣʏr̥], lit. 'Land Road') or Route 26 is a national road in Southern Region. It runs from the ring road near Hella through the Landssveit area to the intersection of Þjórsárdalsvegur. From there it is called Sprengisandsleið, although this name is also refers to Route F26, which starts at the end of Route 26 near Þórisvatn.

== See also ==
- Sprengisandsleið
