= Route F35 (Iceland) =

Road in Iceland

Route F35
- Kjalvegur
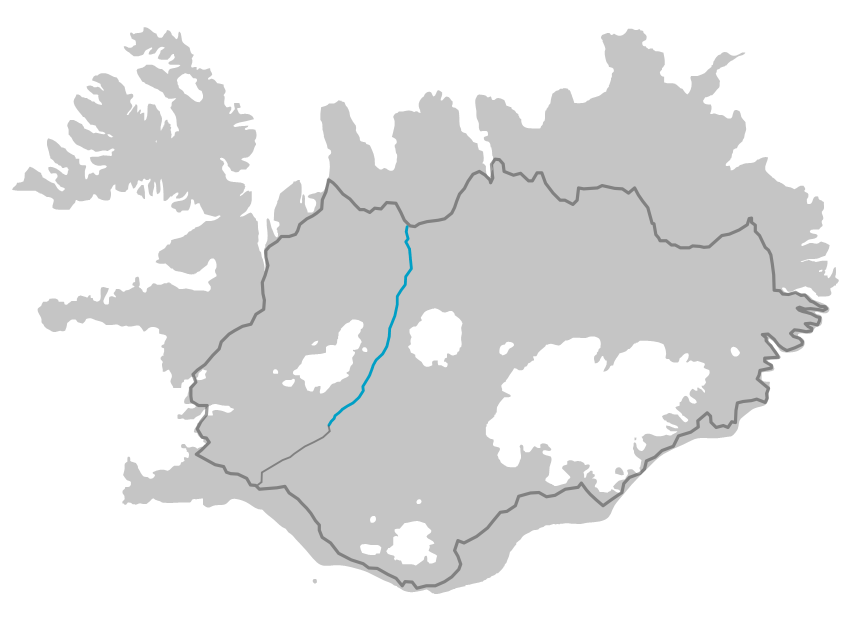

Route information
- Length: 168 km (104 mi)

Major junctions
- Northern end: Route 1 Hringvegur
- Southern end: Route 35 Biskupstungnabraut

Location
- Country: Iceland

Highway system
- Roads in Iceland

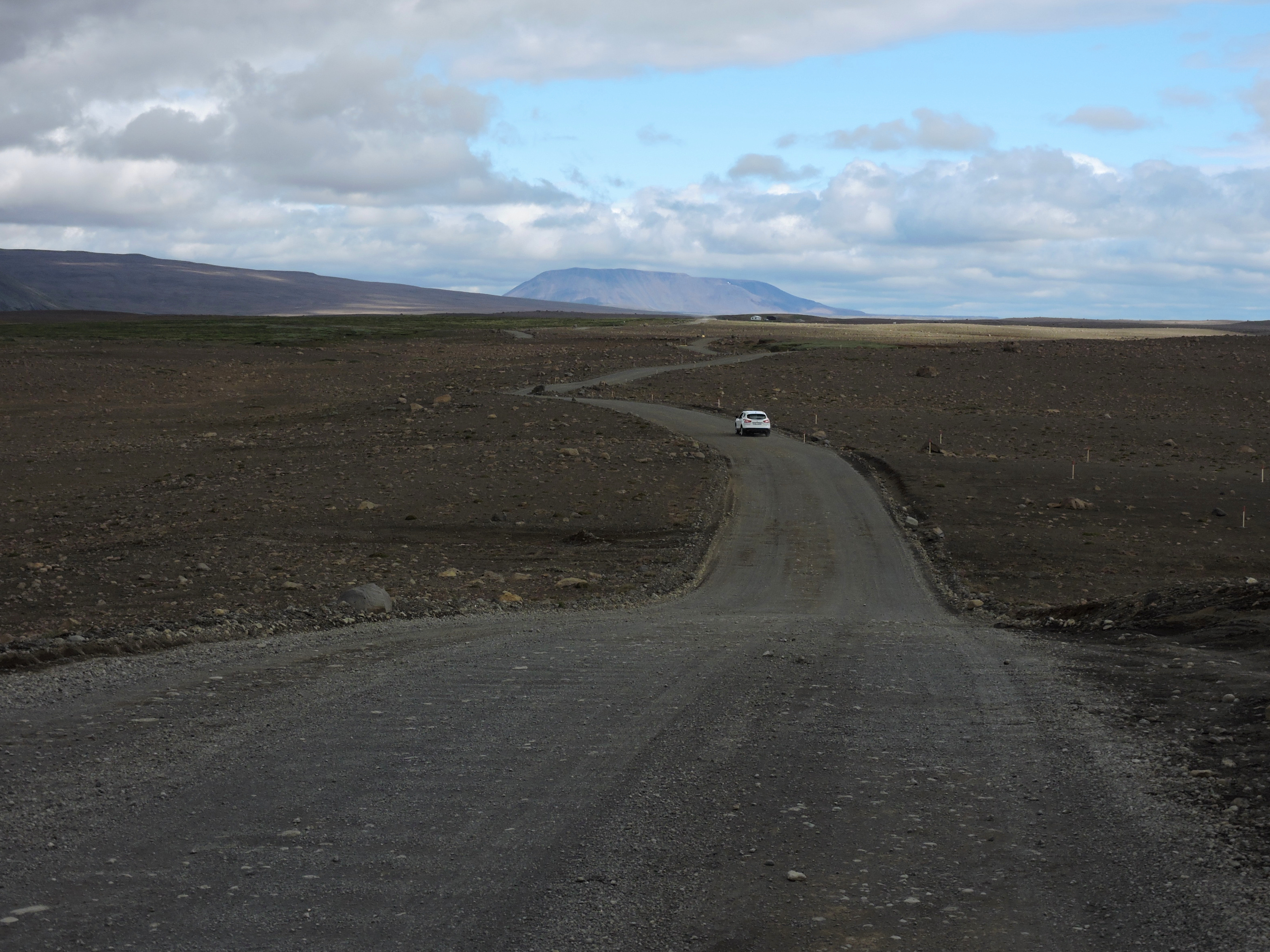
Kjölur plateau and the Kjalvegur F35 road, between Gullfoss and Hveravellir

Kjalvegur (Icelandic pronunciation: [ˈcʰalˌvɛːɣʏr̥], lit. 'Kjölur Road') is a highland road in Iceland, crossing Kjölur from north to south.

== History ==
Formerly, the name referred to a horse-track closer to Langjökull, west of the current road. This track now goes by the name Kjalvegur hinn forni (Ancient Kjalvegur), and is closed to motorized traffic.

== Geography ==
The road begins in the south of Iceland near Haukadalur and behind the Gullfoss waterfall, ending in the north near Blönduós. The road traverses the interior between two glaciers, Langjökull and Hofsjökull. It is the second longest of the roads through the Highlands of Iceland. It takes about 5 hours to traverse by car, the road is generally rough, but river crossings are bridged.

== See also ==
- Route 35 (Iceland)
- Sprengisandsleið
- Kjölur
