= Argentine Air Force =

Air warfare branch of Argentina's armed forces

- Fuerza Aérea Argentina
- Argentine Air Force wings
- Founded: 4 January 1945; 81 years ago
- Country: Argentina
- Type: Air force
- Role: Aerial warfare
- Size: 13,837 personnel
- Part of: Argentine Armed Forces
- Nickname: FAA
- March: Spanish: Alas Argentinas "Argentine Wings"
- Anniversaries: 10 August (anniversary); 1 May (Baptism of fire during the Falklands War)
- Engagements: Operation Independence; 1975 Monte Chingolo attack; Falklands War; Gulf War; Operation Uphold Democracy
- Website: argentina.gob.ar/fuerzaaerea

Commanders
- Commander-in-Chief: President Javier Milei
- Chief of General Staff: Brigadier General Gustavo Javier Valverde
- Deputy Chief of General Staff: Brigadier Major Néstor Guajardo

Insignia
- Roundel

- Fin flash

Aircraft flown
- Attack: Pampa
- Fighter: F-16 Fighting Falcon
- Helicopter: Bell 412, Bell 212, Hughes 500D, SA315, Mil Mi-171
- Patrol: Tucano
- Reconnaissance: Pucará
- Trainer: T-6 Texan II, Tucano, Pampa, Grob 120TP
- Transport: C-130, DHC-6, C-12 Huron

The Argentine Air Force (Spanish: Fuerza Aérea Argentina, or simply FAA) is the air force of Argentina and one of three branches of the Armed Forces of the Argentine Republic. In 2018, it had 13,837 military and 6,900 civilian personnel. The FAA commander in chief is Brigadier Gustavo Valverde.

== History ==
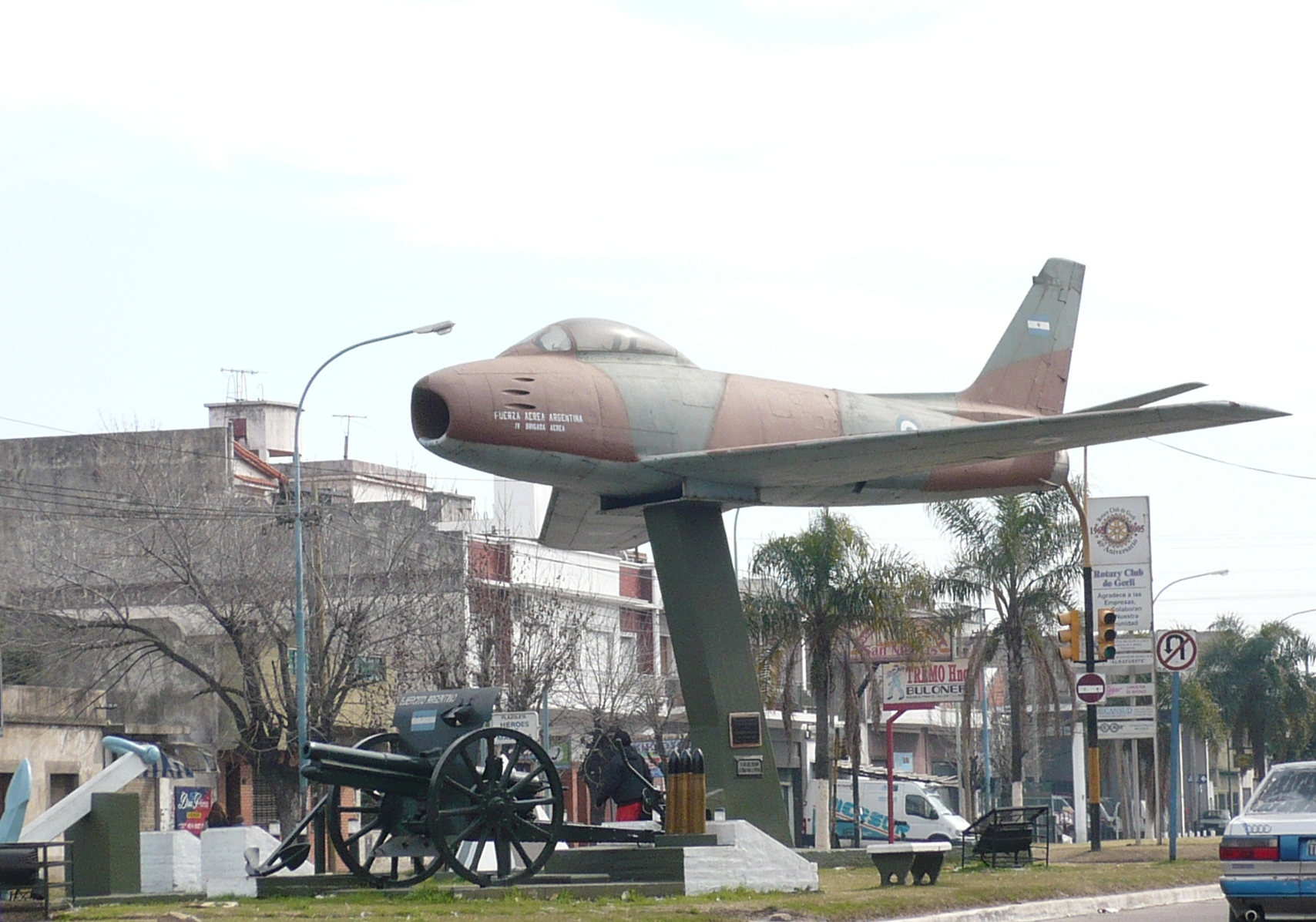
FAA F-86 Sabre

The Air Force's history began with the establishment of the Army Aviation Service's Escuela de Aviación Militar ('Military Aviation School') on 10 August 1912.

=== Interwar period ===
Throughout the years following World War I, the predecessor to the Argentine Air Force received various aircraft from France and Italy. In 1922, the Escuela Militar de Aviación was temporarily disbanded, resulting in the formation of Grupo 1 de Aviación ('Aviation Group One') as an operational unit. During 1925, the Escuela Militar de Aviación was reopened, and the Grupo 3 de Observación ('Observation Group Three') created, with Grupo 1 de Aviación becoming known as Grupo 1 de Observación shortly after.

In 1927, the General Aeronautics Authority (Dirección General de Aeronáutica) was created to coordinate the country's military aviation. In that same year, the Fábrica Militar de Aviones (lit. 'Military Aircraft Factory', FMA), which would play a crucial role in the country's aviation industry, was founded in Córdoba. Despite that, throughout the 1930s, Argentina acquired various aircraft from the United Kingdom, Germany, and the United States.

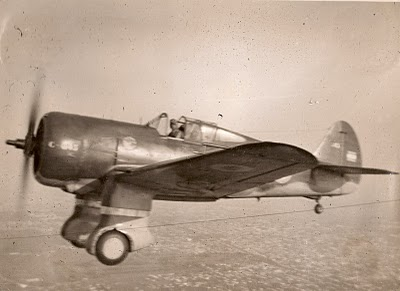
FMA-built Curtiss-Hawk 75O

By 1938–39, Argentina's air power consisted of roughly 3,200 personnel (including about 200 officers) and maintained approximately 230 aircraft. Roughly 150 of these were operated by the army and included Dewoitine D.21 and Curtiss P-36 Hawk fighters; Breguet 19 reconnaissance planes; Northrop A-17 and Martin B-10 bombers, North American NA-16 trainers, Focke-Wulf Fw 58 multi-role planes, Junkers Ju 52 transports, and Fairchild 82s. Approximately 80 out of the 230 aircraft present were operated by the navy and included the Supermarine Southampton, Supermarine Walrus, Fairey Seal, Fairey III, Vought O2U Corsair, Consolidated P2Y, Curtiss T-32 Condor II, Douglas Dolphin, and Grumman J2F Duck.

=== World War II and immediate post-war ===
The first step towards establishing the Air Force as a separate branch of the Armed Forces was taken during 11 February 1944 to establish the Aeronautical Command-in-Chief (Comando en Jefe de Aeronáutica) directly under the mandate of the Department of War. This later became the Argentine Air Force by decree on 4 January 1945, which also created the Secretary of Aeronautics (Secretaría de Aeronáutica).

At the end of World War II, the Air Force began a process of modernization. This 'golden age' (roughly 1945–1955) was ushered in by the availability of foreign currency in Argentina, an abundance of now-unemployed aerospace engineers from Germany, Italy, and France, and the British provision of latest-generation engines alongside other aircraft parts. In his first term, President Juan Perón brought teams of European engineers to the FMA, then known as the Instituto Aerotécnico ('Aerotechnical Institute'), or I.Ae., to promote aircraft technological development. The count totaled to around 750 workers, including two teams of German designers (led by Kurt Tank) and the French engineer Émile Dewoitine.

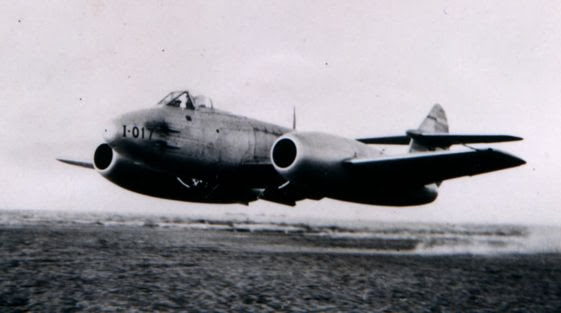
Argentine Gloster Meteor F.4, c. 1955

In 1947, the Air Force purchased 100 Gloster Meteor jet fighters. These aircraft were paid for by the United States to partially pay back its debt to Argentina, which had provided them with raw materials during World War II. This purchase caused the Argentine Air Force to become the first in Latin America equipped with jet-propelled combat fighters. In addition, several Avro Lincoln and Avro Lancaster bombers were also acquired.

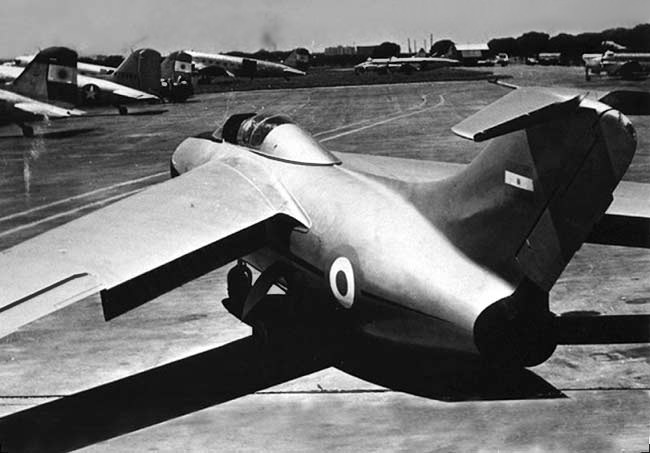
The Pulqui II second prototype (No. 02), c. 1951

The Air Force, with former Luftwaffe officers as consultants and with the European teams that Perón had brought, also began to develop its own aircraft, including the I.Ae. 27 Pulqui I and the I.Ae. 33 Pulqui II jet fighter prototypes. These manufactures gave Argentina the positions of the first country in Latin America and the sixth in the world to develop jet fighter technology on its own. Other Argentina-developed aircraft included the prototypes the I.Ae. 23 trainer, the bi-motor fighter I.Ae. 30 Ñancú, and the assault glider I.Ae. 25 Mañque; and the production twin-engine I.Ae. 35 Huanquero transport, the I. Ae 22 DL advanced trainer, and the I.Ae 24 Calquín twin-engine attack-bomber; as well as rockets, and planes for civilian use (like the FMA 20 El Boyero).

=== Cold War period ===
==== The Revolución Libertadora (1955) ====
The Argentine Air Force came into active operation for the first time on June 16, 1955, during the bombing of the Plaza de Mayo in Buenos Aires. Government loyalist Gloster Meteors fought rebel planes that attempted a failed assassination of the President as part of a coup d'état. The plan failed, and the rebels bombed the city and the House of Government. In the following September coup, the Air Force supported Perón's government by initiating combat operations and transporting troops and arms with a meager five aircraft defecting to the other side. After the Revolución Libertadora succeeded and the coup took place, previously mentioned manufacturing operations ceased and most foreign workers left the country, including engineer Kurt Tank who went to work in India. Despite claims that the Argentine Air Force "baptism by fire" took place during the Malvinas War (1982), this was actually the first time it entered combat.

==== Antarctic support ====
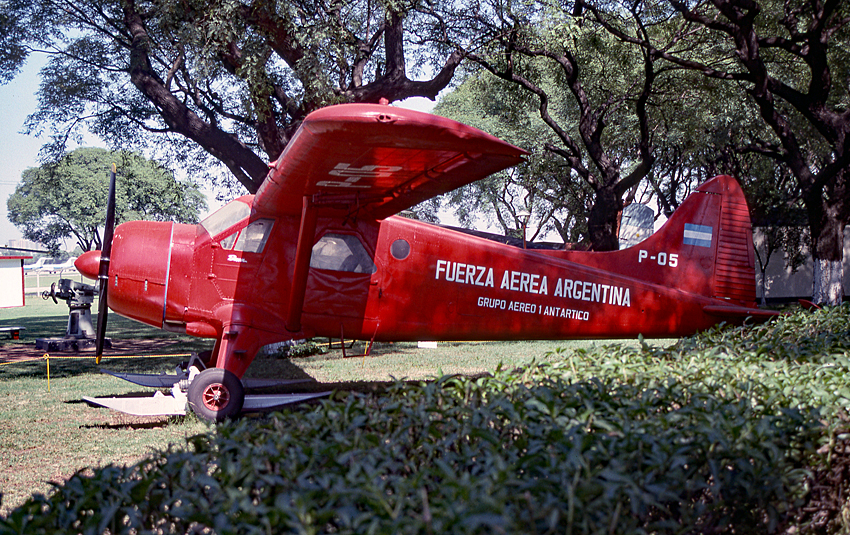
DHC Beaver equipped with skis for Antarctic operations

In 1952, the Argentine Air Force began supplying the country's Antarctic scientific bases using ski-equipped Douglas C-47 aircraft. This mission had previously been entrusted to the Antarctic Task Forces (Fuerzas de Tareas Antárticas, FATA), established by President Juan Domingo Perón.

In 1970, the Air Force incorporated the C-130 Hercules into Antarctic operations. Notably, the presidential aircraft—a Fokker F-28 Fellowship—is reported to have been the first jet to land in Antarctica, in 1973.

Since the 1970s, DHC-6 Twin Otter aircraft have also been deployed for Antarctic missions. In October 1973, the Air Force launched Operation Transantar, which included the first trans-Antarctic and three-continent flight in history. A C-130 Hercules flew a route connecting Río Gallegos, Base Marambio, Christchurch (New Zealand), and Canberra (Australia).

==== Modernization (1960s–1970s) ====
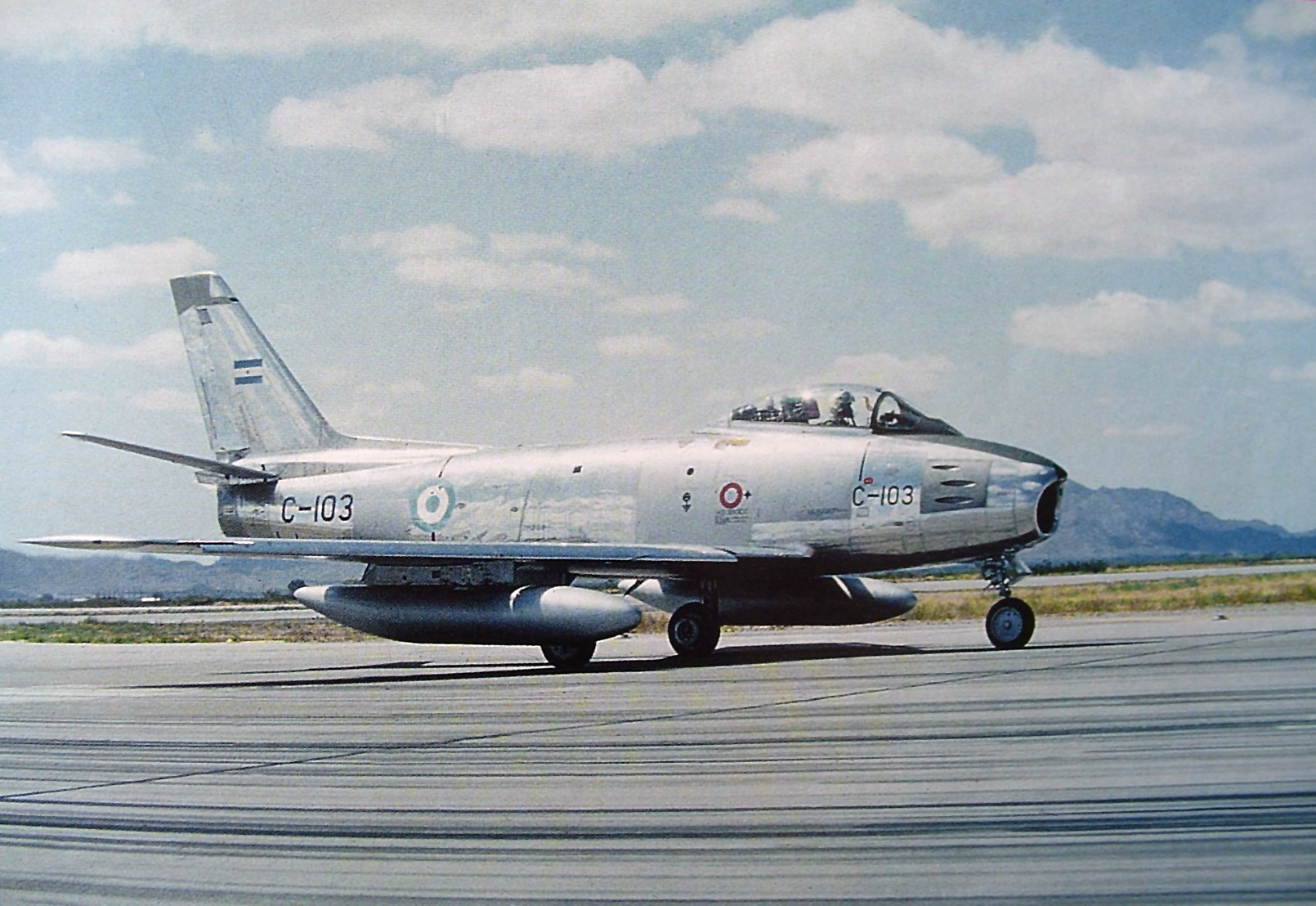
Arrival of F-86 in September 1960, "Operation SABRE"

In the 1960s, new aircraft were incorporated, including the F-86F Sabre jet fighter and the Douglas A-4 Skyhawk mainly used for ground-attack. During the 1970s, the Air Force re-equipped itself with Mirage III interceptors, IAI Dagger multi-role fighters, and C-130 Hercules cargo planes. A counter-insurgency airplane, the Pucará, was also manufactured and used in substantial numbers. The Air Force also had an important role in the 1976 coup which lead to a military dictatorship that lasted until 1983.

==== Falklands War (1982) ====
The Falklands War was the first war fought by the Argentine Air Force against an external enemy. Some operational aircraft were obsolete. During the war, the Air Force division of the Military Junta was called the Fuerza Aérea Sur (FAS, 'Southern Air Force'), and led by Ernesto Crespo.

Air engagements began on May 1, 1982 with the UK's Royal Air Force initiating Operation Black Buck, in which the Avro Vulcan bomber XM607 attacked military air bases on the islands. The Task Force then sent Sea Harriers to attack positions at Stanley and Goose Green, where the first Argentine casualties occurred.

On June 8, the Air Force carried out an operation in Bluff Cove. The British were using the landing ships RFA Sir Galahad and RFA Sir Tristram to position the 5th Infantry Brigade for an assault on Port Stanley. As these ships were unloading and therefore vulnerable, they were attacked by nine A-4 Skyhawks in two waves, while five Daggers attacked the escorting frigate HMS Plymouth.

On June 13, the A-4 Skyhawks of the Argentine Air Force renewed their attacks in two formations of four aircraft each and launched an attack against enemy troops and helicopters. On June 14, 1982, the Argentine command surrendered, returning control of the Falklands, South Georgia, and the South Sandwich Islands to the United Kingdom. The Argentine Air Force suffered 55 dead and 47 wounded, with 505 combat departures and 62 aircraft losses, as listed below:

- 19 A-4 Skyhawk
- 2 Mirage III
- 11 Dagger
- 2 Canberra
- 24 IA-58 Pucará
- 1 C-130H Hercules
- 1 Learjet 35
- 2 Bell 212

=== Post-war (1983–2003) ===
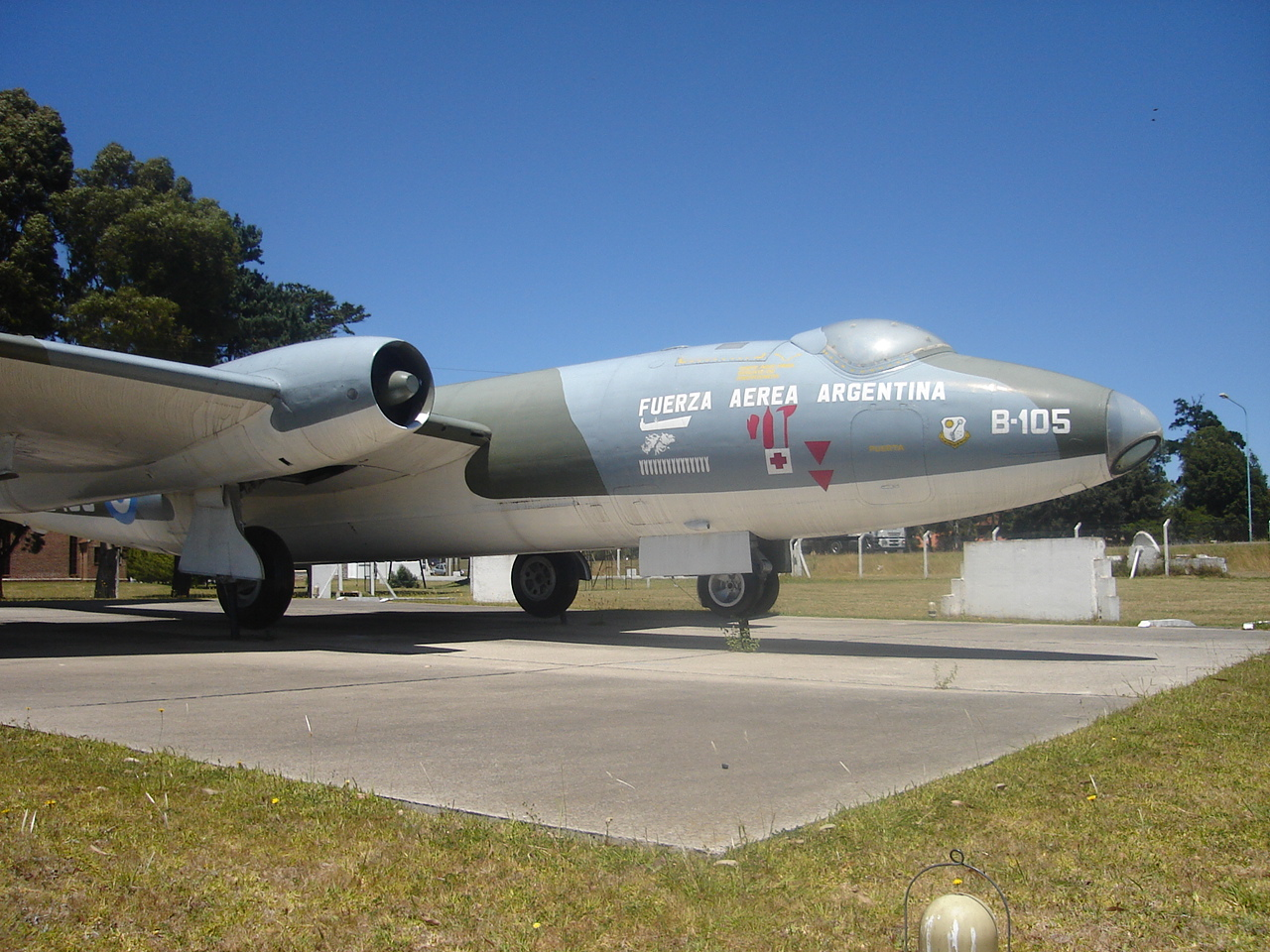
Canberra preserved at Mar del Plata Airport

Argentina started the development of brand new aircraft, including the FMA IA-63 Pampa, the combat fighter FMA SAIA 90, and the subsequent transformation of the Condor missile into a medium-range ballistic missile. Of these, only the Pampa was successfully developed.

During 1994, President Carlos Menem discontinued mandatory military service and began allowing women to serve.

=== Support to UN peacekeeping missions ===
The Argentine Air Force has been involved in United Nations peacekeeping missions, sending a contingent to Cyprus in 1994 and deploying Bell 212 helicopters to Haiti during 2005.

=== Early 21st century ===
In early 2005, seventeen brigadiers, including the Chief of Staff, Brigadier General Carlos Rohde, were fired by President Néstor Kirchner following a scandal involving drug trafficking through Ezeiza International Airport. Kirchner cited failures in the security systems of the Argentine airports, which were overseen by the National Aeronautic Police, then a branch of the Air Force (predecessor of the today independent Airport Security Police), and cover-ups of the scandal.

==== 2010s ====
As of 2010, budgetary constraints continued, leading to the disbanding of the Boeing 707 transport squadron and maintenance problems for half of the C-130 Hercules fleet.

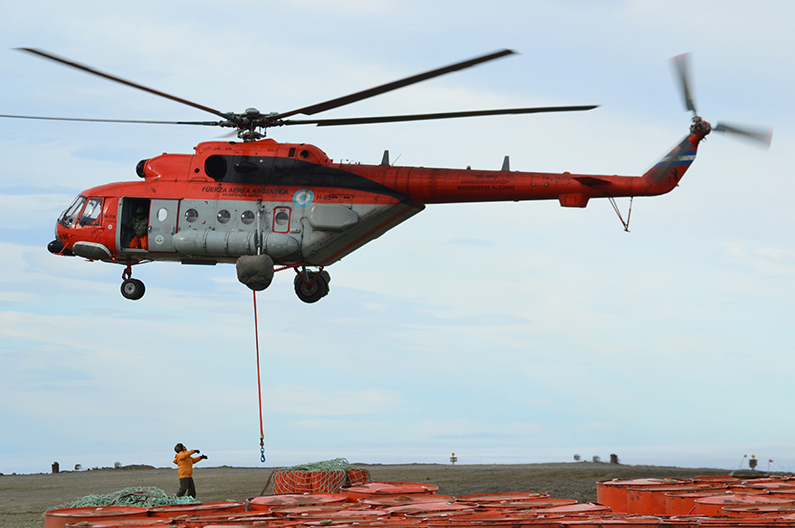
An Argentine Air Force Mi-171E during the 2017/18 Summer Antarctic Campaign

In August 2010, a contract was signed for two Mi-17E helicopters, plus an option on a further three, to support Antarctic bases.

The FAA has been seeking to replace its ageing force with more capable and more serviceable modern aircraft. The acquisition of Spanish Mirage F1Ms, IAI Kfir Block 60s and Saab Gripen E/Fs were considered, but as of February 2015, all of those deals appear to have stalled; the Mirage F1 deal was scrapped by the Spanish government in March 2014, after pressure from the UK to not assist in FAA modernization over tensions between the countries over the Falkland Islands. The UK has also managed to veto the sale of Gripen E/Fs, as 30% of the Gripen's parts are manufactured there. The deal with Israel has reportedly stalled for technical and political reasons. China has allegedly offered JF-17/FC-1's and Chengdu J-10's to Argentina. The two countries have formed a working group to look into the transfer of 14 aircraft. Russia had also offered to lease 12 Su-24 strike aircraft to the FAA, but Jane's reported that the Su-24 would not be very useful to the FAA and that "it would appear that any proposed transfer of such aircraft is likely the result of Russia playing political games with the UK over the continuing crisis in Ukraine." All Mirages were officially decommissioned on 30 November 2015. The A-4s were grounded as of January 2016, for lack of spares; in any case only 4–5 were airworthy with the rest in storage at Villa Reynolds. When Barack Obama visited in March 2016, Air Force One was accompanied by US Air Force F-16s because Argentina could only offer Pucarás and Pampas for air defense.

As of July 2019, the Argentine Air Force and government selected the KAI FA-50 as its interim fighter. With this act being the first step in modernizing the fighter force and replacing the Mirage 3, Dagger, and Mirage 5 fighters that have also been retired; it was also anticipated that obtaining FA-50 would help mitigate the retirement of the Martin A-4AR Fightinghawk fleet, as they were ageing and becoming difficult to maintain. As of 2020, it is reported that as few as six of the Fightinghawk aircraft remain operational. While no specific numbers of aircraft to purchase were given, the media reported that up to 10 FA-50s were considered. Despite elections coming in October 2019, the deal had been expected to go through. An Argentine delegation first visited the Republic of Korea Air Force in September 2016. At that time an FAA pilot was able to test fly the TA-50 Golden Eagle operational trainer variant of the FA-50.

However, the deal appeared to have been canceled in early 2020, leaving the Air Force without a fighter replacement. Some sources suggested that the cancellation was due to the financial pressures resulting from the COVID-19 pandemic, while others reported that British intervention played a part by preventing the export of an aircraft incorporating various British components. In October 2020, Korea Aerospace Industries (KAI) confirmed that since major components of the aircraft were supplied by the U.K., the aircraft could not be exported to Argentina. Britain similarly blocked the potential sale of Brazilian license-built Saab Gripen aircraft to Argentina, given that some avionics were of British origin. Argentina was now said to be exploring the potential acquisition of aircraft from Russia, China, India or Pakistan. However, even sales of Chinese aircraft reportedly encountered potential problems since the ejector seats of the aircraft were the MK6, manufactured by Martin-Baker in the UK.

==== 2020s ====
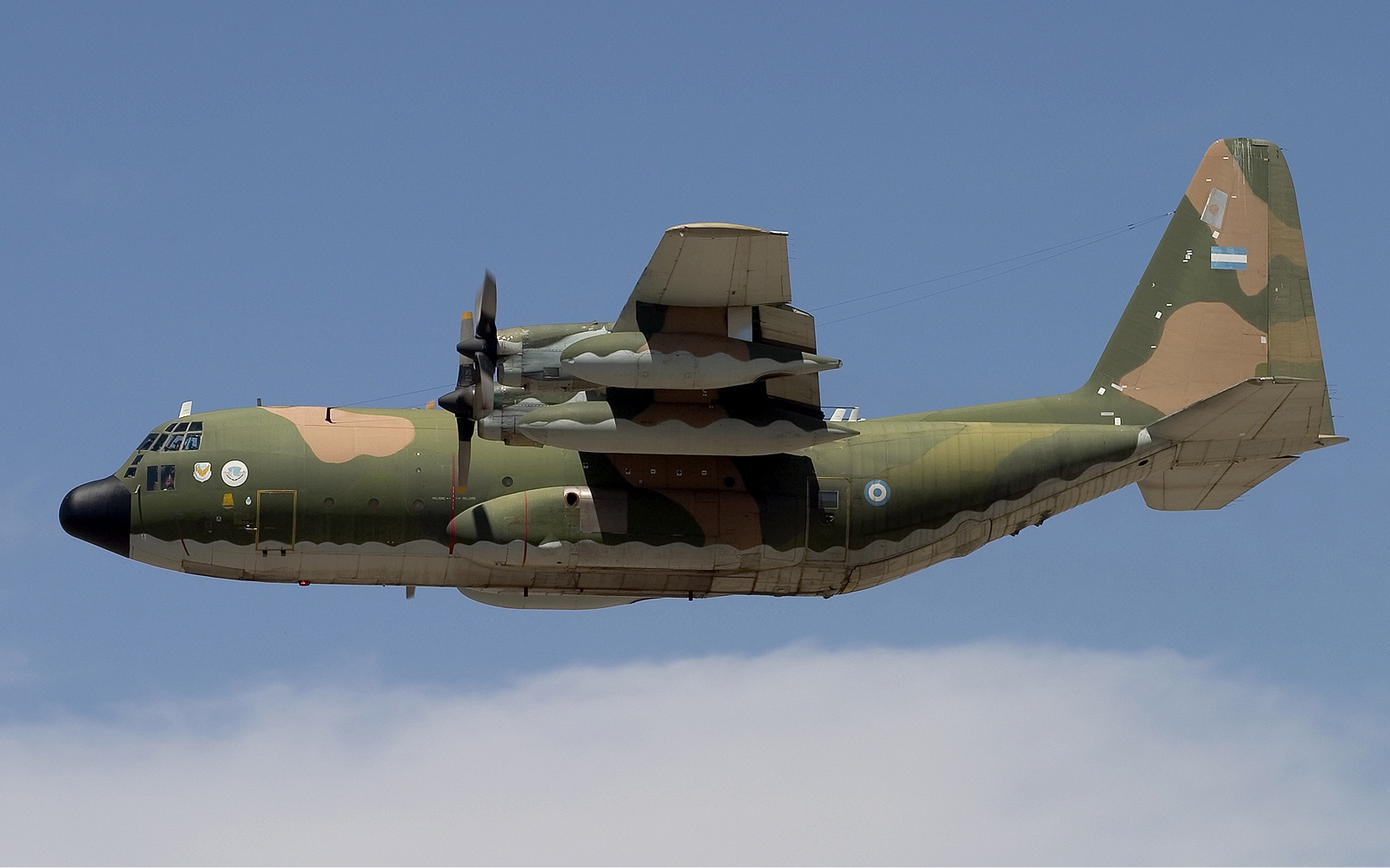
KC-130H aerial refueling aircraft.

Early in 2021, Russia made several proposals related to the acquisition of aircraft by Argentina including the apparent offer of MiG-35 fighters. These built on earlier offers of the MiG-29 as well as on measures being undertaken to extend the life of Mi-171E helicopters acquired by Argentina in 2010 to support operations in Antarctica.

To improve transport capabilities, two Fokker F-28 aircraft which had been decommissioned in 2019, have been refurbished and put into service, the last one (TC-53) in early August 2021.

In mid 2021, one analysis found that the numbers of operational aircraft with offensive combat capability were practically at a level of zero. In addition to only around six A-4 Fightinghawk aircraft being operational, the availability of C-130 transport aircraft was only assessed as being at six of originally 14 aircraft. However, 23 IA-63 Pampa, 12 T-6C+ Texan II and 12 EMB-312 Tucano trainer aircraft were reported operational as of 2021. In September 2021, the Government officially included funding of $664 million in a draft budget for Congress involving the purchase of new combat aircraft. In 2022, talks with China over the potential purchase of JF-17 Thunders, and possibly Chengdu J-10s, and with India for HAL Tejas fighter jets came to the fore. However in December 2022, Argentine President Alberto Fernández appeared to reject the notion of buying new fighter aircraft for the air force, stating: “There are other priorities before buying weapons, definitely”. Referring to the strategic and political situation in South America he further commented that: “There are no war problems, peace is the common denominator between us.” It was simultaneously confirmed that the fighter aircraft replacement program had been stopped.

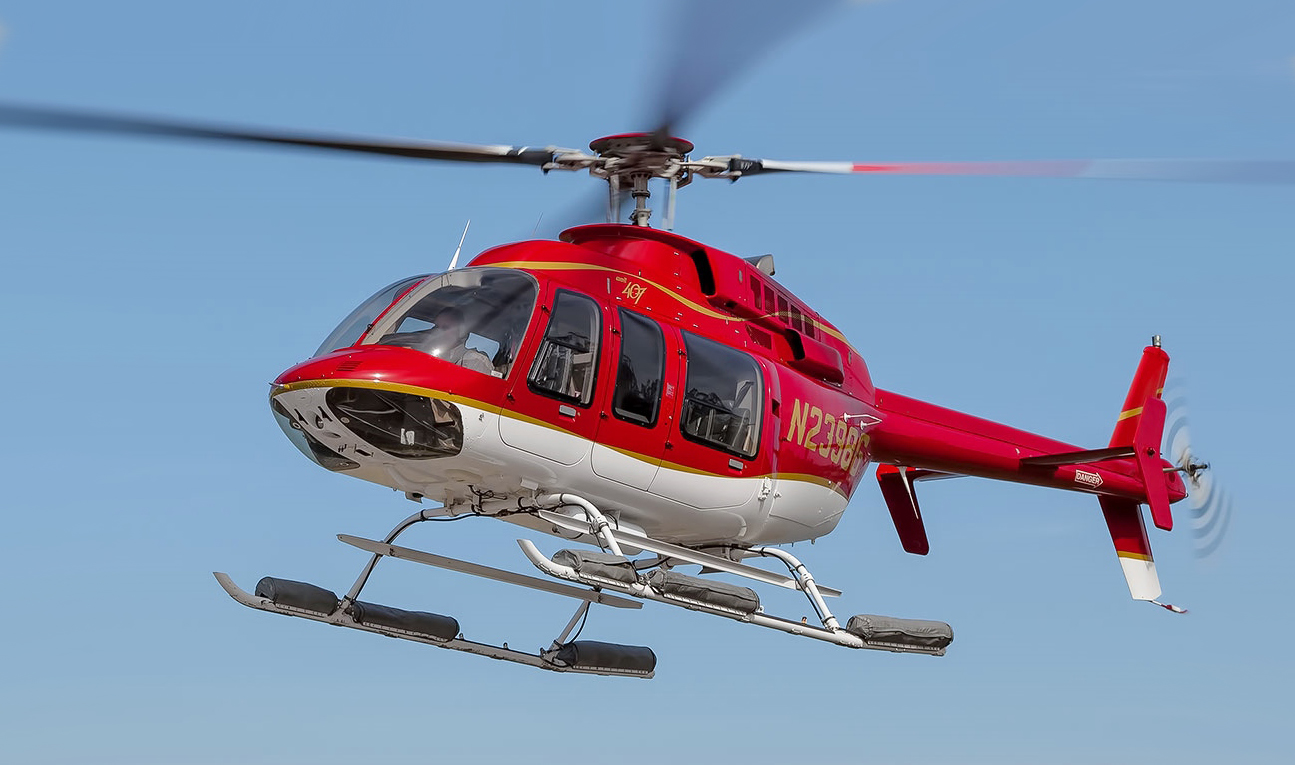
Bell 407

In early 2023, Argentina confirmed the purchase of six Bell 407 for the Armed Forces and plans for the modernization of its inventory of Hughes 500Ds pending the arrival of new Beechcraft TC-12B Hurons.

In June 2023, Argentina received an additional leased C-130 from the US, bringing the total number of operational C-130 to five aircraft. At the same time, the Biden administration asked Congress to approve the potential sale of former Royal Danish Air Force F-16s, as well as former Royal Norwegian Air Force P-3C Orion maritime patrol aircraft, to Argentina. While the US was reportedly supporting the sale in order to avoid the possibility that Argentina would turn to China for its fighter aircraft, it was anticipated that the United Kingdom would urge Denmark not to make the sale. It was also unclear whether the combined acquisition cost (of $447 million USD) would be considered affordable by Argentina. On 11 October 2023, Deputy Assistant Secretary for Regional Security Mira Resnick confirmed to Jorge Argüello, Argentinean ambassador to the US, that the State Department has approved the transfer of 38 F-16s from Denmark. In March 2024, it was reported that the number of aircraft had been reduced to 24 but that discussions on concluding the deal would be initiated. On March 26, 2024, the Danish Defence Minister, Troels Lund Poulsen, signed a letter of intent with his Argentine counterpart to transfer 24 F-16AM/BM aircraft. The first six aircraft were transferred starting in December 2025 and the remaining aircraft are to follow in three annual batches of six up to 2028. The second batch of six (bringing the total to twelve, plus one non-flying airframe) F-16s was delivered on 30 September 2026.

In May 2026, it was announced that the Air Force's A-4AR Fightinghawk fighter-bombers had been formally retired from service.

== Organization ==
The Argentine Air Force (FAA) is one of the three branches of the Argentine military, having equal status with the Army and the Navy; the President of Argentina is Commander-in-Chief of all three.

The FAA is headed by the Chief of the General Staff (Jefe del Estado Mayor General), directly appointed by the President. The Chief of Staff usually holds the rank of Brigadier General, the highest rank of the Air Force, being seconded by the Deputy Chief of the General Staff and three senior officers in charge of the FAA's three Commands: the Air Operations, the Personnel, and the Materiel Command.

The Air Operations Command (Comando de Operaciones Aéreas) is the branch of the Air Force responsible for aerospace defense, air operations, planning, training, and technical and logistical support of the air units. Subordinate to the Air Operations Command are the Air Brigades (Brigadas Aéreas), the Air Force's major operative units, as well as the airspace surveillance and control group (Grupo VYCEA, Argentine Air Force). There is currently estimated to be a total of eight air brigades operational. Brigades are headquartered at Military Air Bases (Base Aérea Militar (BAMs).

Each Air Brigade is made up of three Groups, each bearing the same number as their mother Brigade. These groups include:

- One Air Group (Grupo Aéreo), which operates the aircraft assigned to the Brigade. The Air Group is divided into a variable number of Air Squadrons. Air Groups may be named according to their primary mission, for example, an air group specialized in fighter operations receives the designation of Fighter Group (Grupo de Caza). Currently, the Air Force includes three Fighter Groups (4th, 5th, and 6th), one Attack Group (3rd), one Transport Group (1st), and three plain Air Groups (2nd, 7th, and 9th). The 7th Air Group operates all the helicopters of the Air Force, while the 2nd includes a small reconnaissance unit as well as light transport aircraft. 9th Air Group is a light transport unit.
- One Technical Group (Grupo Técnico), in charge of the maintenance and repair of the Brigade's aircraft.
- One Base Group (Grupo Base), responsible for the airbase itself, weather forecasting, flight control, runway maintenance, etc. Base Groups also include Base Flights (Escuadrillas de Base), generally made up of two or three liaison aircraft.

The Personnel Command (Comando de Personal) is responsible for the training, education, assignment, and welfare of Air Force personnel. Under the control of the Personnel Command are the Military Aviation School (which educates the future officers of the Air Force), the Air Force Non-Commissioned Officer (NCO) School, and other educational and training units.

The Materiel Command (Comando de Material) deals with planning and executing the Air Force's logistics regarding flying and ground materiel. Materiel Command includes "Quilmes" and "Río Cuarto" Material Areas (repairing and maintenance units) and "El Palomar" Logistical Area.

=== Order of battle ===
- 1st Air Brigade (El Palomar Military Air Base, Buenos Aires Province) in El Palomar Airport
  - 1st Air Transport Squadron (C-130H Hercules; KC-130H Hercules; L-100-30 Hercules)
  - 2nd Air Transport Squadron (Fokker F-28; partially used for state-run internal commercial flights as of 2021)
  - 5th Squadron (Boeing 707 retired)
- 2nd Air Brigade (Paraná Military Air Base, Entre Ríos Province) in General Justo José de Urquiza Airport
  - 2nd Reconnaissance Squadron (Learjet 35A)
  - 4th Squadron (Fokker F27-400M retired)
  - Services Squadron (Cessna 182)
- 3rd Air Brigade (Reconquista Military Air Base, Santa Fe Province) in Daniel Jukic Airport
  - Services Squadron (Cessna 182)
  - 14th Antiaircraft Artillery Battery (Oerlikon GAI-D01; Elta EL/M-2106)
- 4th Air Brigade (El Plumerillo Military Air Base, Mendoza Province) in Governor Francisco Gabrielli International Airport

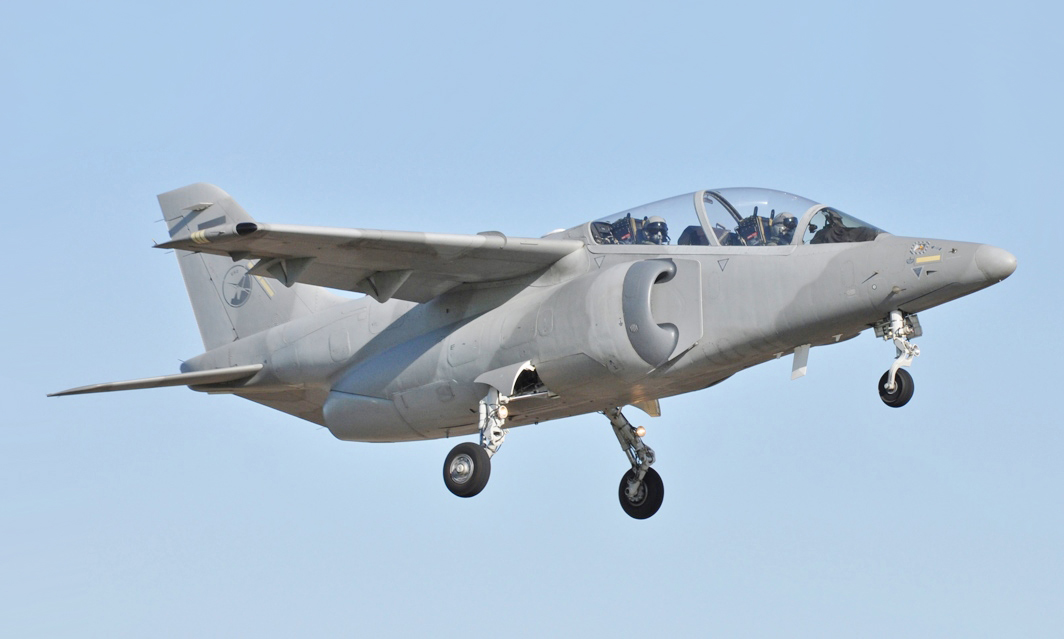
FMA Pampa trainer aircraft.

  - 1st Training Squadron (FMA IA-63 Pampa serie 2)
  - 3rd Search and Rescue Squadron (SA-315B Lama)
  - 4th Cruz del Sur Aerobatics Squadron (Su-29 retired)
  - Fighter School
  - 4th Antiaircraft Artillery Battery (Oerlikon GAI-D01; Elta EL/M-2106)
  - West Tactical Intelligence Squadron
- 5th Air Brigade (Villa Reynolds Military Air Base, San Luis Province) in Villa Reynolds Airport

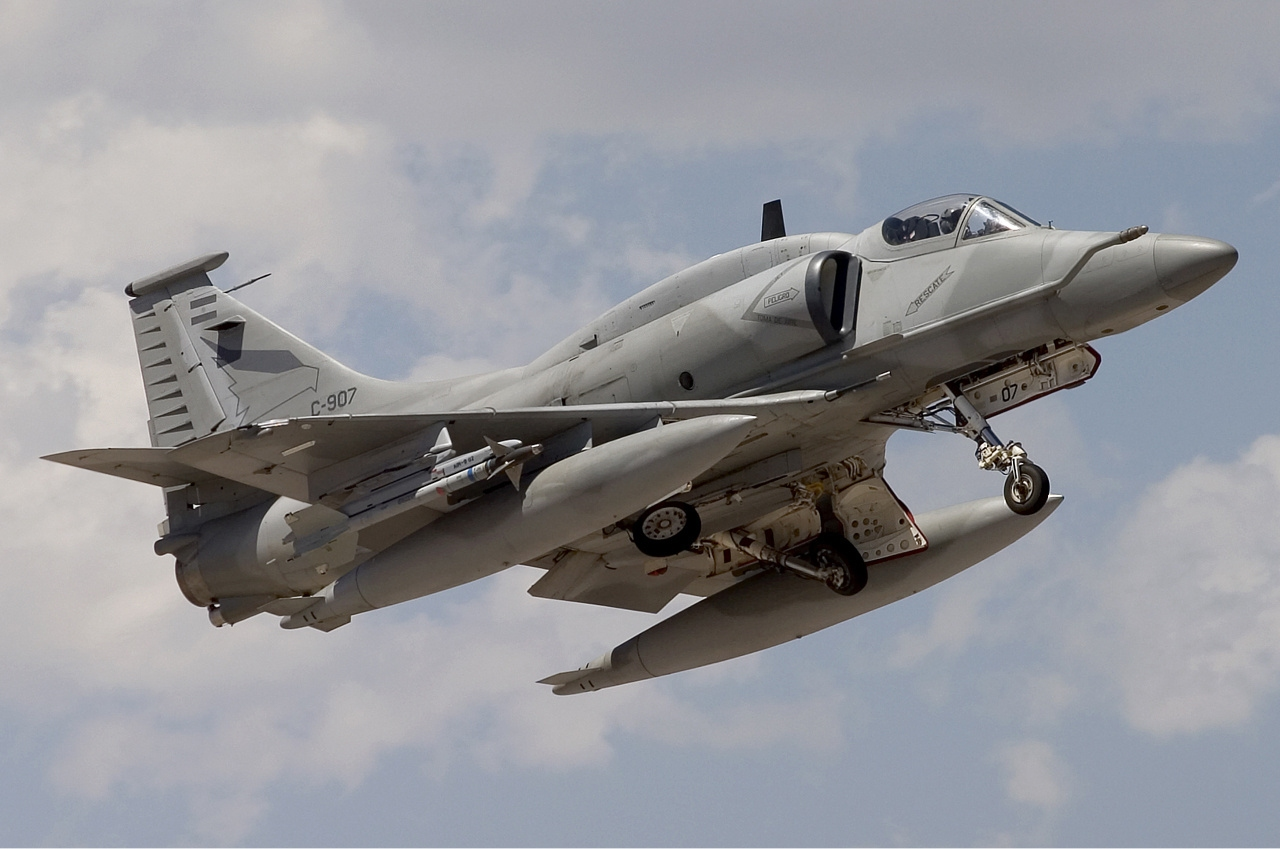
An A-4AR taking off from Governor Francisco Gabrielli Int'l Airport

  - 1st Fighter-Bomber Squadron (formerly A-4AR Fightinghawk; retired 2026)
  - 2nd Fighter-Bomber Squadron (A-4AR Fightinghawk) (Operational availability of Fightinghawk fleet reported in 2022 at perhaps 15-20% of 23 aircraft; no flights after mid-2024)
  - Services Squadron (Cessna 182; Hughes 500D)
  - 5th Antiaircraft Artillery Battery (Rheinmetall RH 202; Elta EL/M-2106)
- 6th Air Brigade (Tandil Military Air Base, Buenos Aires Province) in Tandil Airport (converting to F-16A/B MLU Fighting Falcon from December 2025)
  - 1st Fighter-Bomber Squadron (AMD Mirage 5P Mara retired)
  - 2nd Fighter-Bomber Squadron (IAI Finger retired)
  - 3rd Air Interceptor Squadron (AMD Mirage IIIEA/DA retired)
  - Grupo 6 de Caza (IA-63 Pampa II/III) (reported to upgrade to IA-63 Pampa III as of 2023)
  - Services Squadron (Cessna 182; Aerocommander 500)
  - 13th Antiaircraft Artillery Battery (Oerlikon GAI-B01)
- 7th Air Brigade (Moreno Military Air Base, Buenos Aires Province) in Mariano Moreno Airport
  - 1st Search and Rescue Squadron (Bell 212; Bell 412EP)
  - 2nd Tactical Squadron (Hughes 500D)
  - 3rd Squadron (Mil Mi-171E)
  - Special Operations Group (Spanish: Grupo de Operaciones Especiales, GOE)
- 9th Air Brigade (Comodoro Rivadavia Military Air Base, Chubut Province) in General Enrique Mosconi International Airport
  - 6th Air Transport Squadron (SAAB 340B)
  - 7th Air Transport Squadron (DHC-6 Twin Otter)
  - 7th Antiaircraft Artillery Battery (Rheinmetall RH 202)
  - South Tactical Intelligence Squadron
- Morón Military Air Base (Buenos Aires Province) in Morón Airport
  - Unknown Squadron (Piper PA-34-220T Seneca; Piper/Chincul PA-28RT-201 Arrow; Piper PA-28-236 Dakota; Cessna 182)
- Mar del Plata Military Air Base (Buenos Aires Province) in Astor Piazzolla International Airport
  - Unknown Squadron (Roland II; Rheinmetall RH 202; Oerlikon GAI-D01; Oerlikon GDF-002; Skyguard)
  - Antiaircraft Weapons Maintenance Squadron (UAV Pegasus; UAV Tehuelche; UAV Murciélago)
- 10th Air Brigade (re-established at Río Gallegos Military Air Base in 2022-23; reported equipping with 3 IA-63 Pampa III as of 2023 - re-deployed from 6 Brigade)
  - Unknown Radar Squadron (AN/TPS-43; may have re-equipped with RPA-170M Air Surveillance and Control radar (medium range 3D tactical air defence radar) deployed to monitor the South Atlantic region as of 2022)
  - 6th Antiaircraft Artillery Battery
- Military Aviation School (Cordoba, Córdoba Province)
  - Glider Flight
  - Services Squadron
  - School Air Squadron (Grob G 120TP; Embraer EMB-312 Tucano; T-6C Texan II)

== Ranks ==
=== Commissioned officer ranks ===
The rank insignia of commissioned officers.

Rank group	General / flag officers				Senior officers			Junior officers
Argentine Air Force
Argentine Air Force	Brigadier general	Brigadier mayor	Brigadier	Comodoro mayor	Comodoro	Vicecomodoro	Mayor	Capitán	Primer teniente	Teniente	Alférez

=== Other ranks ===
The rank insignia of non-commissioned officers and enlisted personnel.

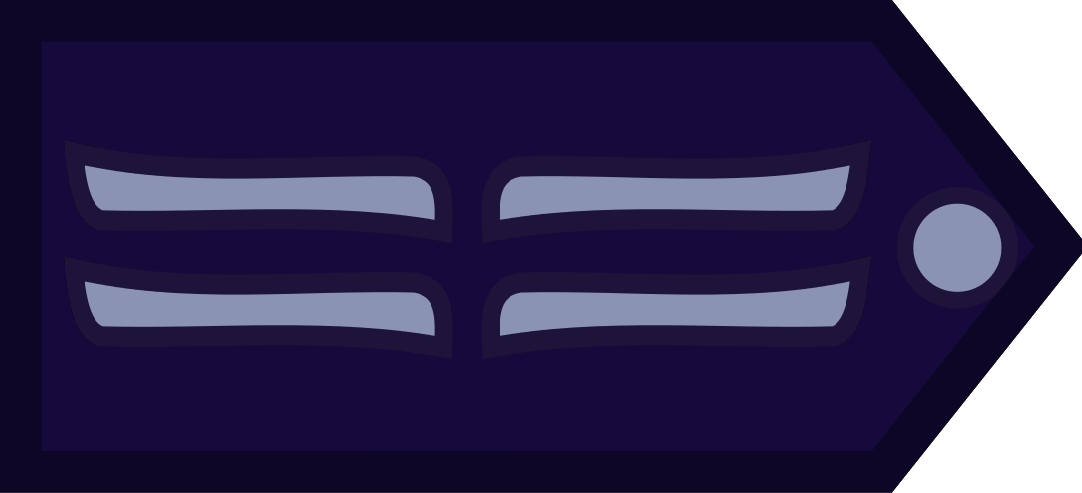
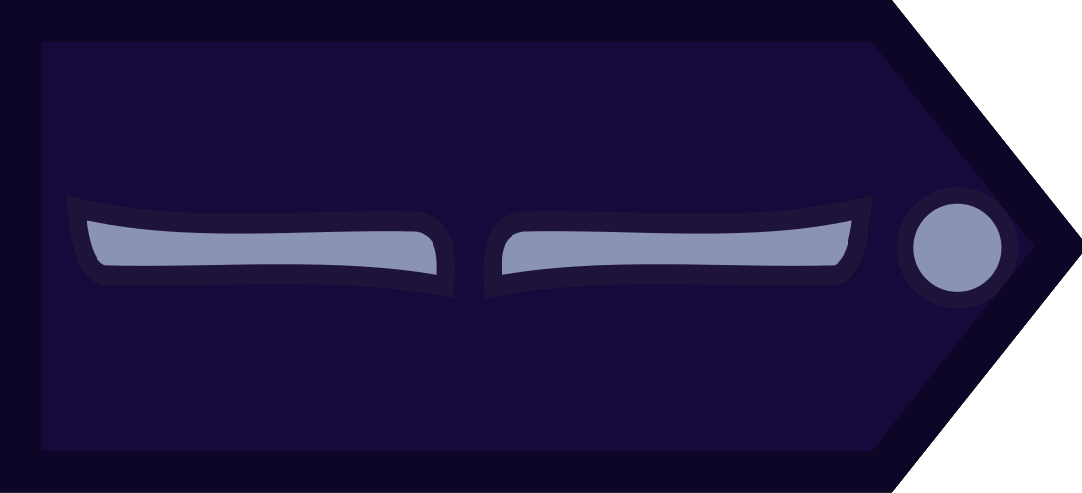
Rank group	Senior NCOs					Junior NCOs		Enlisted
Argentine Air Force
Argentine Air Force	Suboficial mayor	Suboficial principal	Suboficial ayudante	Suboficial auxiliar	Cabo principal	Cabo primero	Cabo	Voluntario primero	Voluntario segundo

== Equipment ==
=== Aircraft ===
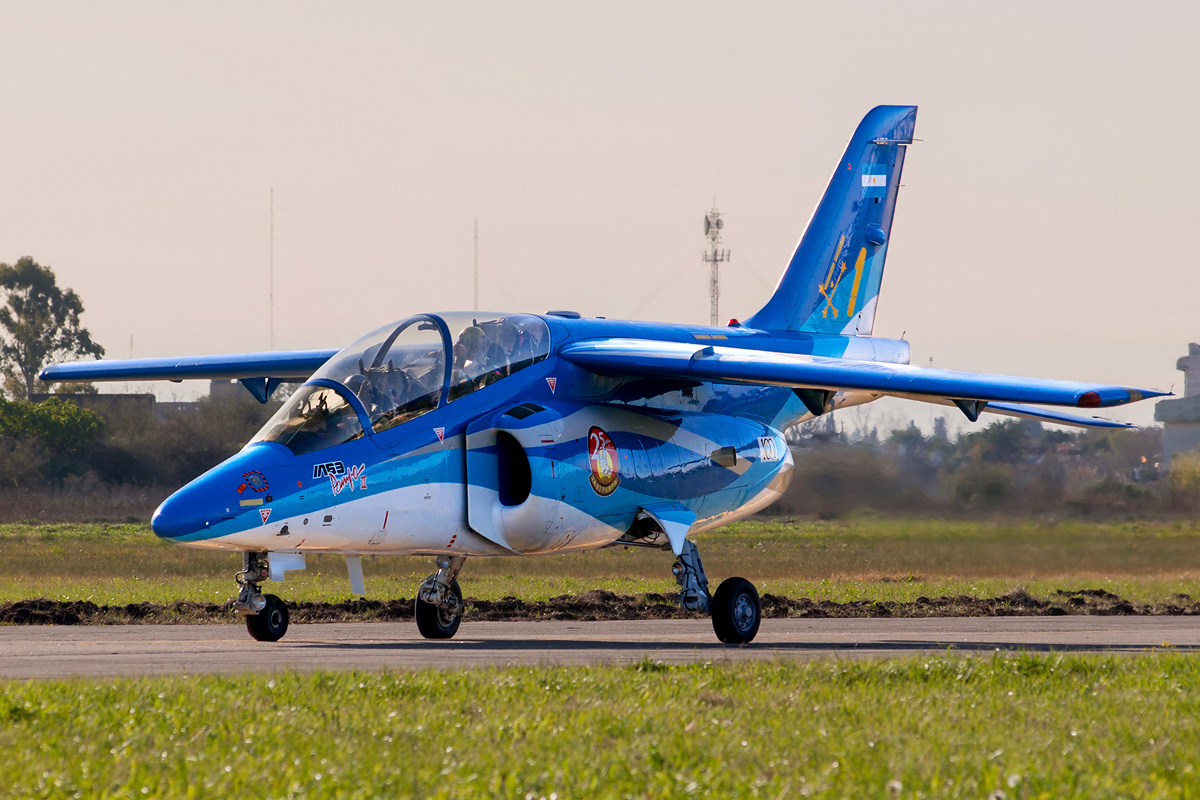
A Pampa II from the Argentine’s aerobatic display team Cruz del Sur

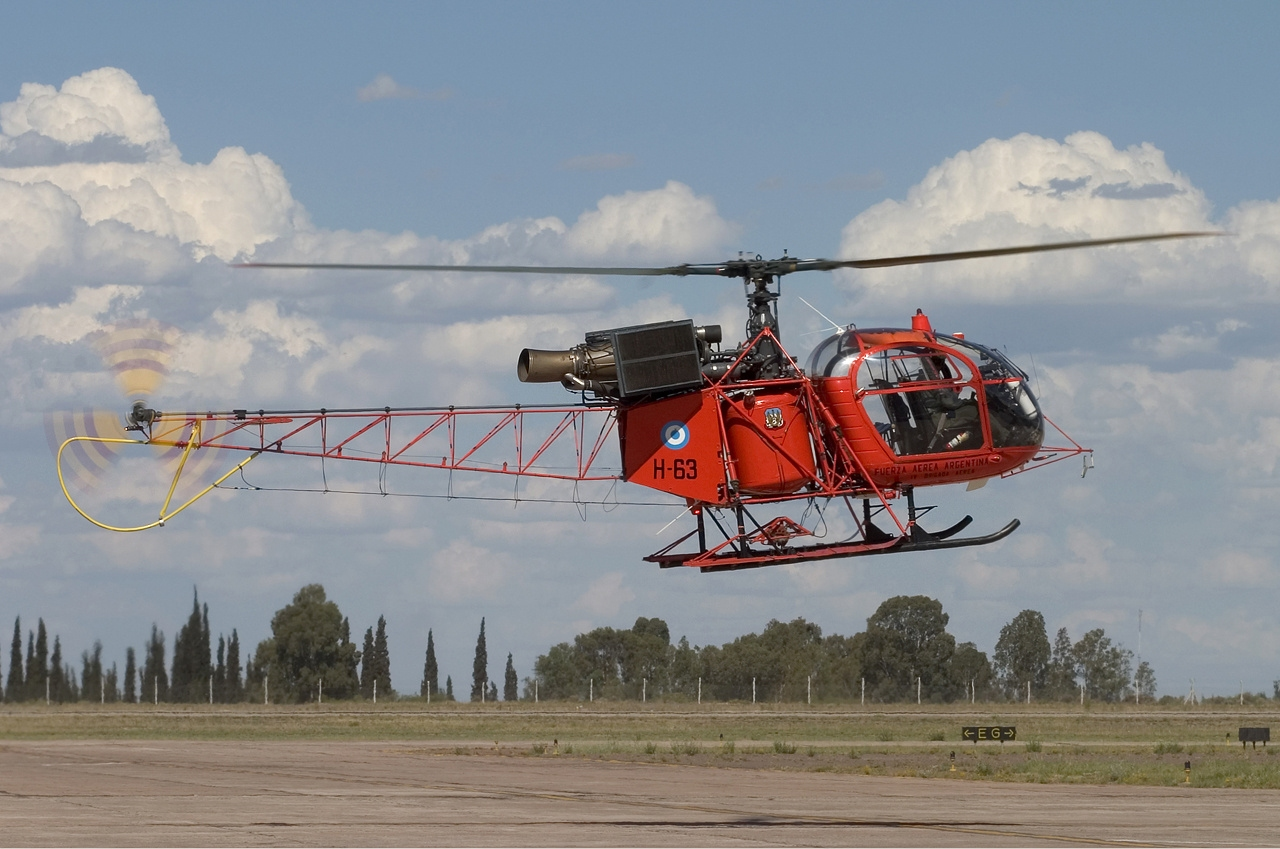
An Aerospatiale SA-315 lifting off from Gabrielli International Airport

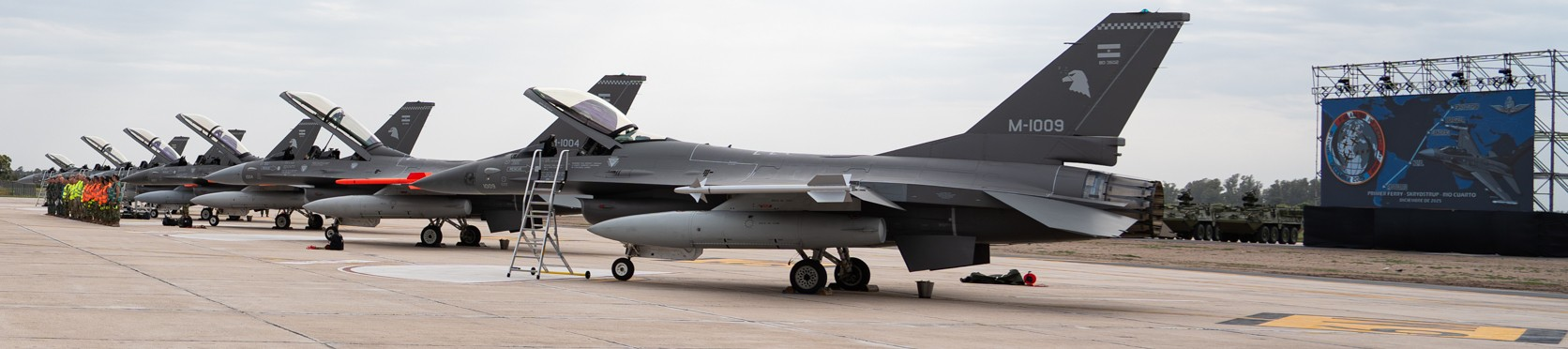
First six F-16 from Skrydstrup delivered by Danish pilots to Rio Cuarto / ARMACUAR

Aircraft	Origin	Type	Variant	In service	Notes
Combat aircraft
F-16 Fighting Falcon	United States	Multirole fighter	A/B Block 15 MLU	12 (+12 on order)	Former Royal Danish Air Force aircraft; letter of confirmation signed by Argentina, April 2024. First six aircraft (two 1-seat, four 2-seat) were transferred in December 2025. Second batch of six were received on 30 September 2026. One non-flying airframe in addition to the 24 aircraft. Armed with AIM-120C-8 AMRAAM missiles and GBU-12 Paveway II guided bombs.
IA 63 Pampa	Argentina	Training	Pampa III	11	4 on order
Reconnaissance
Learjet 35	United States	Electronic-warfare and Reconnaissance	EC-21A	2	1 for electronic-warfare, 1 for reconnaissance
Tanker
KC-130 Hercules	United States	Tanker	KC-130H	2	
Transport
Boeing 737	United States	VIP transport		1	
Boeing 757	United States	VIP transport		1	Presidential transport aircraft
Embraer ERJ-140	Brazil	Transport	ERJ140LR	2	
C-130 Hercules	United States	Tactical airlifter	C-130H	5	One aircraft is a L-100
Saab 340	Sweden	Transport		5	
C-12 Huron	United States	Transport	TC-12B	10	
Super King Air	United States	Transport / Utility	200	2	
Turbo Commander	United States	Utility / VIP transport		3	
Helicopters
Bell 212	United States	Utility		Bell 212 + Bell 412 total 13	
Bell 412	United States	Utility		Bell 212 + Bell 412 total 13	
Bell 407	United States	SAR	407GXi	1	2 on order for the Air Force; further 3 delivered to the Army in 2025
MD 500 Defender	United States	Light utility	MD 500D	8	
SA 315B Lama	France	Liaison		5	
Sikorsky S-70	United States	VIP transport		1	
Sikorsky S-76	United States	VIP transport		2	
Trainer aircraft
Beechcraft T-6 Texan II	United States	Basic trainer	T-6C+	12	
Tecnam P2002 Sierra	Italy	Trainer aircraft		8	
Grob G 120TP	Germany	Basic trainer		8	
EMB-312 Tucano	Brazil	Attack / Trainer		12	Single-turboprop basic trainer
Super King Air	United States	Transport / Utility	200	5	5 provide multi-engine training
IA 63 Pampa	Argentina	Advanced trainer	Pampa II	16	3 in conversion process to Pampa III attack version

== See also ==
=== Argentine military – other air services ===
- Argentine Army
  - Argentine Army Aviation
- Argentine Navy
  - Argentine Naval Aviation
- Military of Argentina

=== Operational history ===
- Argentine air forces in the Falklands War
  - Battle of San Carlos

=== Related units and organisations ===
- Agrupación Aérea Presidencial – Presidential VIP fleet
- Argentine Air Force Mobile Field Hospital
- LADE – State government airline

=== Former aircraft ===
- List of aircraft of the Argentine Air Force
