= Secretary of Aeronautics =

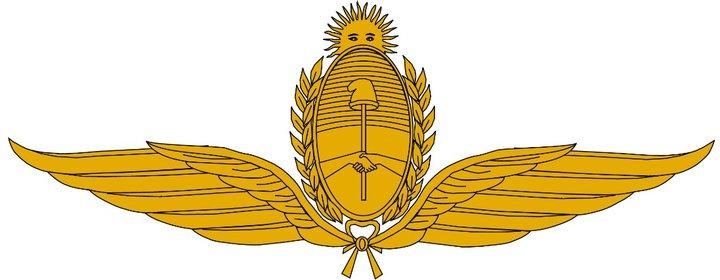
Secretary of Aeronautics

The Secretary of Aeronautics was an entity dependent on the Presidency of the Argentine Nation of the Argentine Republic created on January 4, 1945 by the then de facto president General Edelmiro Julián Farrel in a general agreement of ministers. Its purpose was to bring together under the sole direction and administration of the government all the nation's air activity, until then dispersed in various dependencies. The Argentine Air Force (FAA) is created as an armed force independent of the Army.

The provision for the creation of the Secretariat of Aeronautics placed in charge a Secretary of Aeronautics with the category of Minister of State, while assigning him the leadership of all aviation activity organizations, both civil and military. Its first secretary was Brigadier General Bartolomé de la Colina.

During the last months of the government of General Farrel and then, under the two successive governments of General Perón, the Secretariat of Aeronautics laid the foundations of Argentine air and commercial aerospace expansion by articulating policies for this purpose.
