= Route 32 (Iceland) =

Road in Iceland

Route 32
- Þjórsárdalsvegur
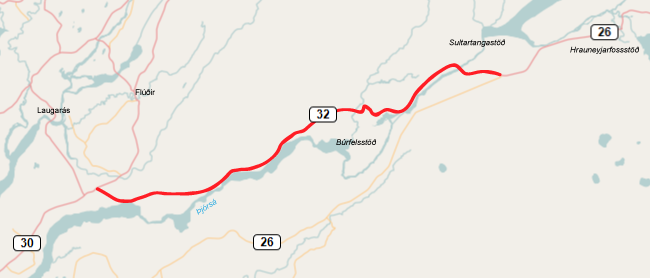

Route information
- Length: 50.8 km (31.6 mi)

Major junctions
- Southern end: Route 30
- Route 325 Gnúpverjavegur; Route 328 Stóra-Núpsvegur; Route 327 Stangarvegur; Route 332 Háafossvegur
- Northern end: Route 26 Landvegur

Location
- Country: Iceland

Highway system
- Roads in Iceland

Þjórsárdalsvegur (Icelandic pronunciation: [ˈθjour̥sˌaurˌtalsˌvɛːɣʏr̥], lit. 'Þjórsárdalur Road') or Route 32 is a national road in the Southern Region of Iceland. It runs from Route 30, through Þjórsárdalur valley to the intersection of Landvegur.
