= Route 37 (Iceland) =

Road in southern Iceland

Route 37
- Laugarvatnsvegur
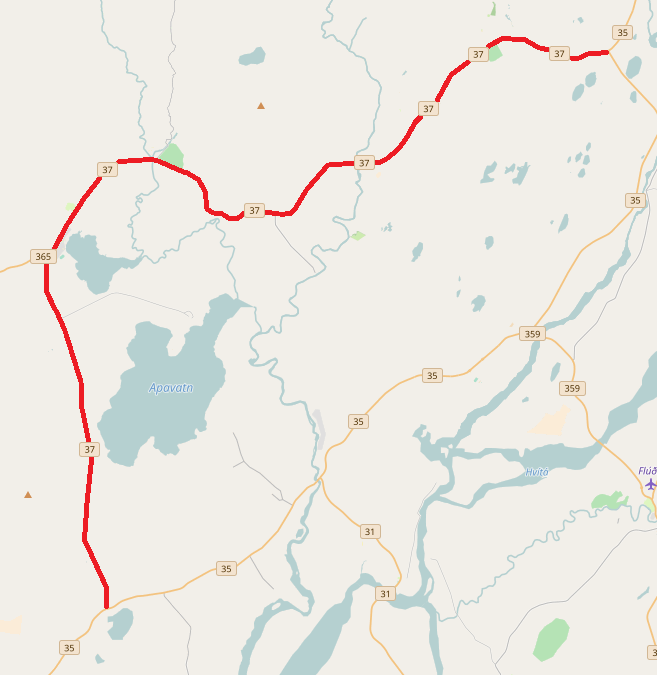

Route information
- Length: 36.4 km (22.6 mi)

Major junctions
- Eastern end: Route 35 Biskupstungnabraut
- Southern end: Route 35 Biskupstungnabraut

Location
- Country: Iceland

Highway system
- Roads in Iceland

Laugarvatnsvegur (Icelandic pronunciation: [ˈlœyːɣarˌvassˌvɛːɣʏr̥], lit. 'Laugarvatn Road') or Route 37 is a primary road in southern Iceland. It is a spur route of Route 35 that connects Laugarvatn to the main road network.
