= Route 31 (Iceland) =

Road in Iceland

Route 31
- Skálholtsvegur
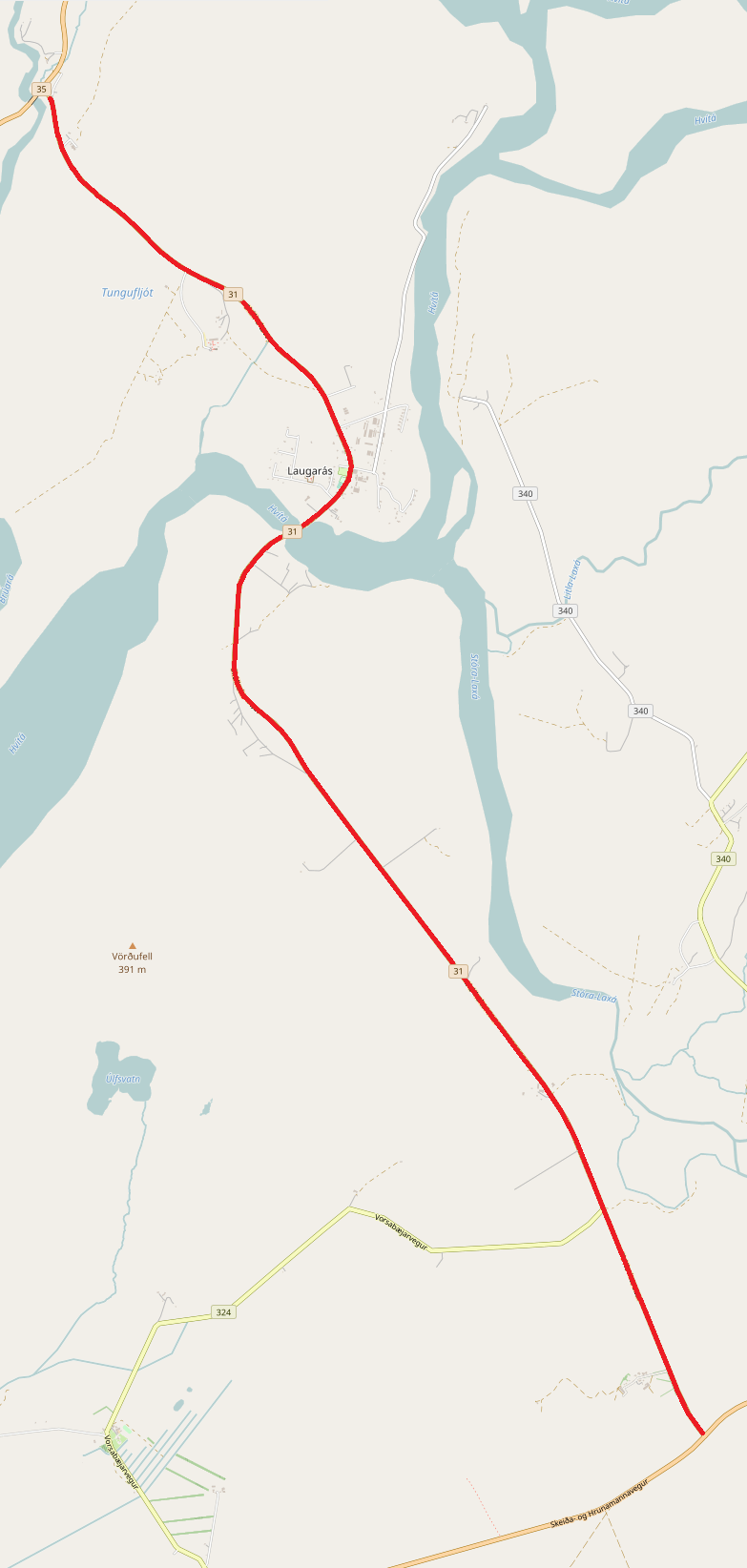

Route information
- Length: 14.6 km (9.1 mi)

Major junctions
- Southern end: Route 30
- Route 324 Vorsabæjarvegur
- Northern end: Route 35 Biskupstungnabraut

Location
- Country: Iceland

Highway system
- Roads in Iceland

Skálholtsvegur (Icelandic pronunciation: [ˈskaulˌhɔl̥(t)sˌvɛːɣʏr̥], lit. 'Skálholt Road') or Route 31 is a national road in the Southern Region of Iceland. It runs from Route 30, through the village of Laugarás to the intersection of Biskupstungnabraut. It passed Skálholt, an historic place in Southern Iceland, and is named after it.
