= Route 35 (Iceland) =

Road in Iceland

Route 35
- Biskupstungnabraut
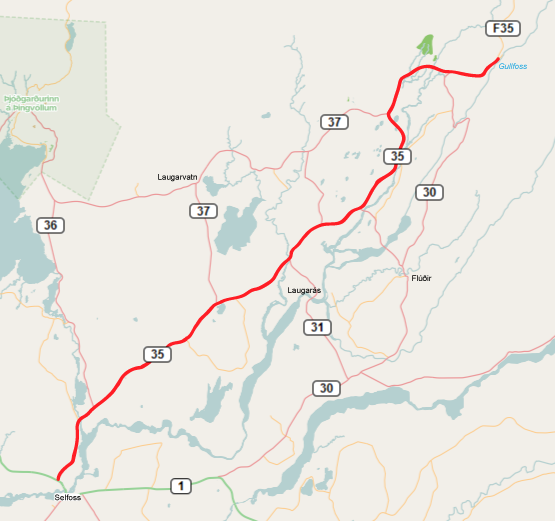

Major junctions
- Southern end: Route 1 Selfoss
- Northern end: Route F35 Kjalvegur

Location
- Country: Iceland

Highway system
- Roads in Iceland

Route 35 is one of the interior roads of Iceland. The road is divided into two main sections. The first part is called Biskupstungnabraut (Icelandic pronunciation: [ˈpɪskʏpsˌtʰuŋnaˌprœyːt, -tʰunːa-], lit. 'Biskupstungur Road') and runs from about one kilometer northwest of Selfoss up to Gullfoss. It is a road for all cars. The second part is Kjalvegur ([ˈcʰalˌvɛːɣʏr̥], lit. 'Kjölur Road'). This is a highland road which runs over the Kjölur plateau. The mountain road has the number F35. Route 35 in total is 237 km long.

== Biskupstungnabraut ==
From the Ring Road (1) the road heads north-east through Árnessýsla forming the primary route to the tourist hotspots of Geysir and Gullfoss. Along the way the road meets several other routes, such as Þingvallavegur (36), Laugarvatnsvegur (37) with distinctive peninsulas and Skálholt Way (31) and Hrunamannavegur (30).

Near the road are a number of tourist attractions. In addition to Geysir and Gullfoss, these include volcanic crater lake Kerið and the Faxi waterfall on the Tungufljót river.

The road crosses the Alviðra. The original bridge was built in 1905 and was its major improvement for the transport in its time. The current bridge was built in 1983.

Biskupstungnabraut runs for 69 km from the Suðurlandsvegur up to Gullfoss.

== Kjalvegur Keel ==
From Gullfoss, the road continues as Kjalvegur, with the number F35 (previously F37). North of Gullfoss, there is a river crossing where traffic must ford over the river.

Approaching Iceland's northern coast, the road ends at Svínvetningabraut (731) at the Langamýri junction in Blöndudalur.

Kjalvegur Keel is 168 km long.

== See also ==
- Kjölur
- Route F35 (Iceland)
