= Route 36 (Iceland) =

Road in Iceland

Route 36
- Þingvallavegur
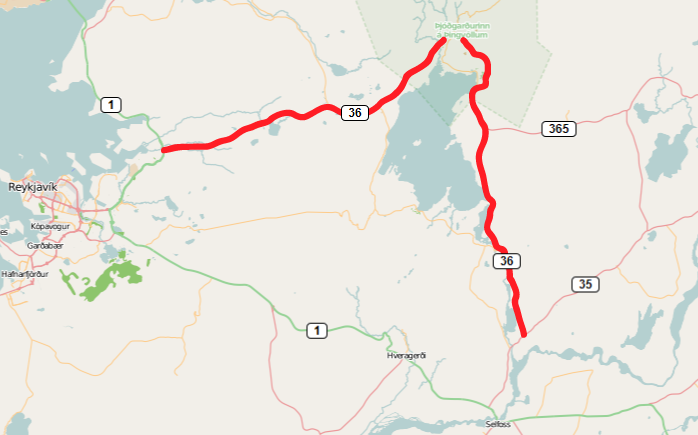

Major junctions
- Western end: Route 1 Vesturlandsvegur
- Southern end: Route 35 Biskupstungnabraut

Location
- Country: Iceland

Highway system
- Roads in Iceland

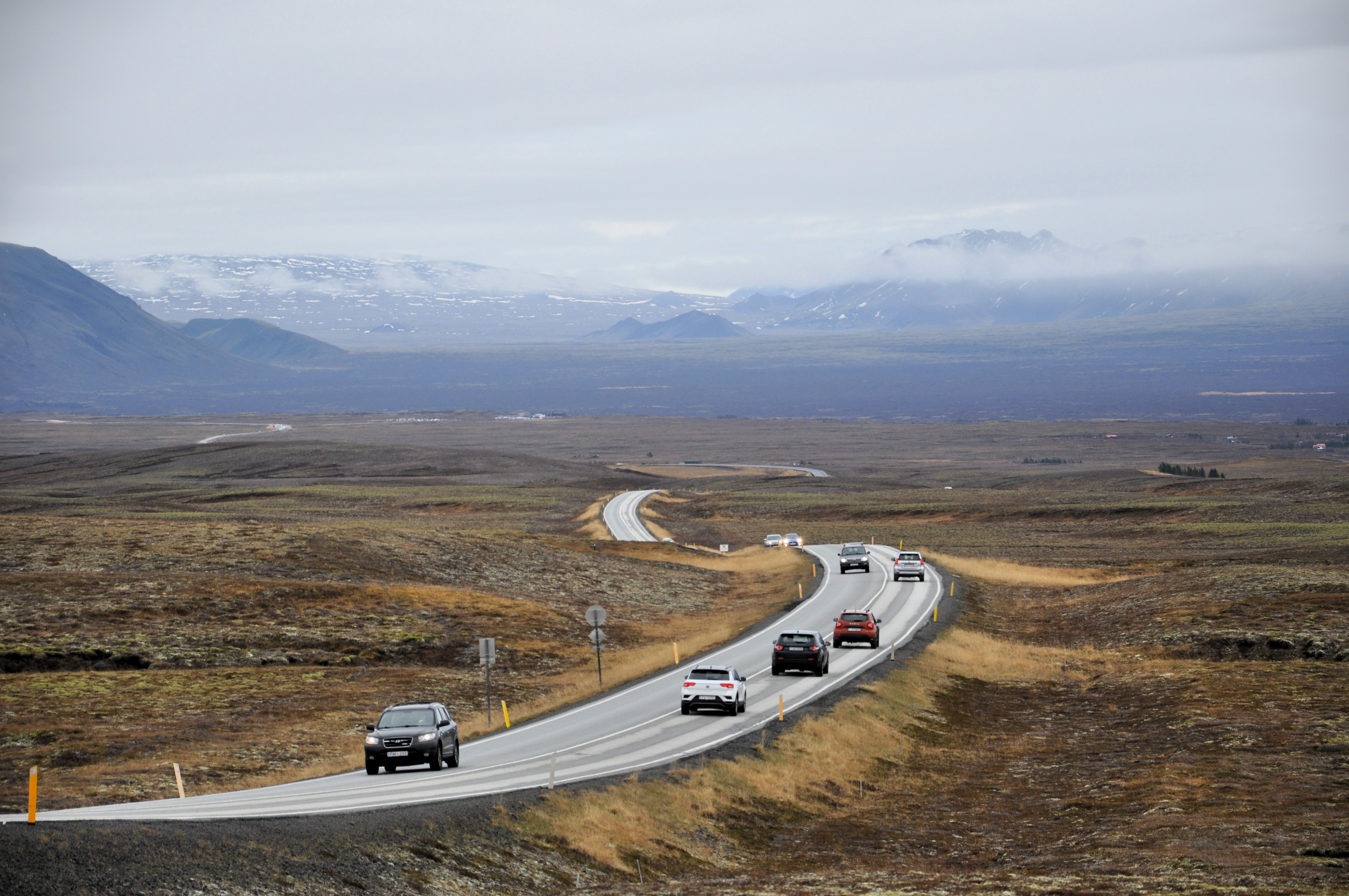
Road No. 36 to Þingvellir

Þingvallavegur (Icelandic pronunciation: [ˈθiŋkˌvatlaˌvɛːɣʏr̥], lit. 'Þingvellir Road') or Route 36 is a primary road in southern Iceland. The road forms the main route from Reykjavík to Þingvellir and forms part of the Golden Circle around Þingvallavatn. The road is 68 km long.

== Route ==
Starting from its junction with Route 35 in Þrastarskógi north of Selfoss, the road runs north along the western shore of Þingvallavatn. The road runs around the north of Thingvellir where it connects with Uxahryggir (Route 52) and Route 550.

The route then heads west towards Reykjavík. Halfway along it junctions with Kjós Pass Road (Route 48) in Háheiðinni. The road ends at the Ring Road just outside Reykjavík.
