= Route 30 (Iceland) =

Road in Iceland

Route 30
- Skeiða- og Hrunamannavegur
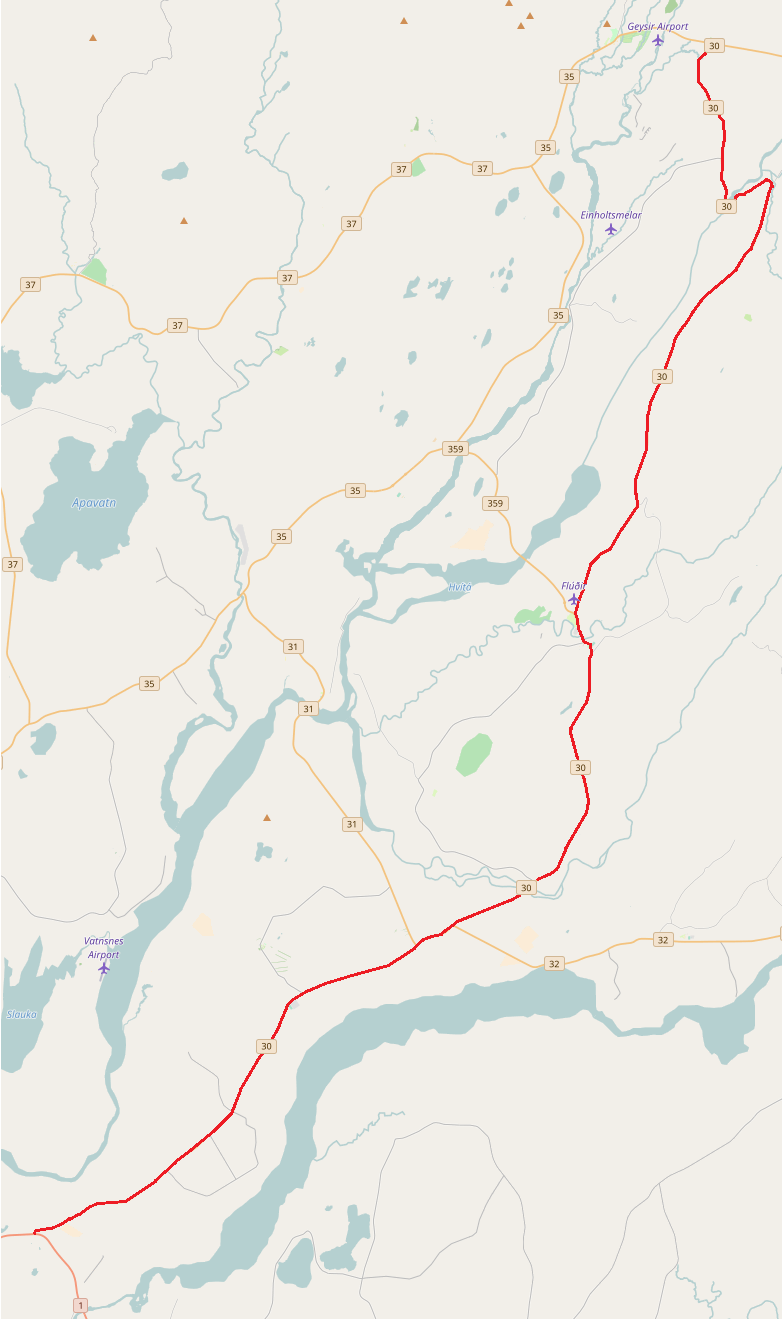

Route information
- Length: 56 km (35 mi)

Major junctions
- Southern end: Route 1
- Route 321 Skeiðháholtsvegur; Route 322 Ólafsvallavegur; Route 324 Vorsabæjarvegur; Route 31 Skálholtsvegur; Route 32 Þjórsárdalsvegur; Route 340 Auðsholtsvegur; Route 344 Hrunavegur; Route 341 Langholtsvegur; Route 359 Bræðratunguvegur; Route 349 Tungufellsvegur; Route 358 Einholtsvegur
- Northern end: Route 35 Biskupstungnabraut

Location
- Country: Iceland

Highway system
- Roads in Iceland

Skeiða- og Hrunamannavegur (Icelandic pronunciation: [ˈsceiːða- ɔɣ ˈr̥ʏːnaˌmannaˌvɛːɣʏr̥], lit. 'Skeiða-and-Hrunamanna Road') or Route 30 is a national road in the Southern Region of Iceland. It runs from Route 1 east of Þjórsá, through the village of Flúðir to the intersection of Biskupstungnabraut.
