= Sprengisandur =

Highland plateau in Iceland

Coordinates: 64°52′N 18°07′W

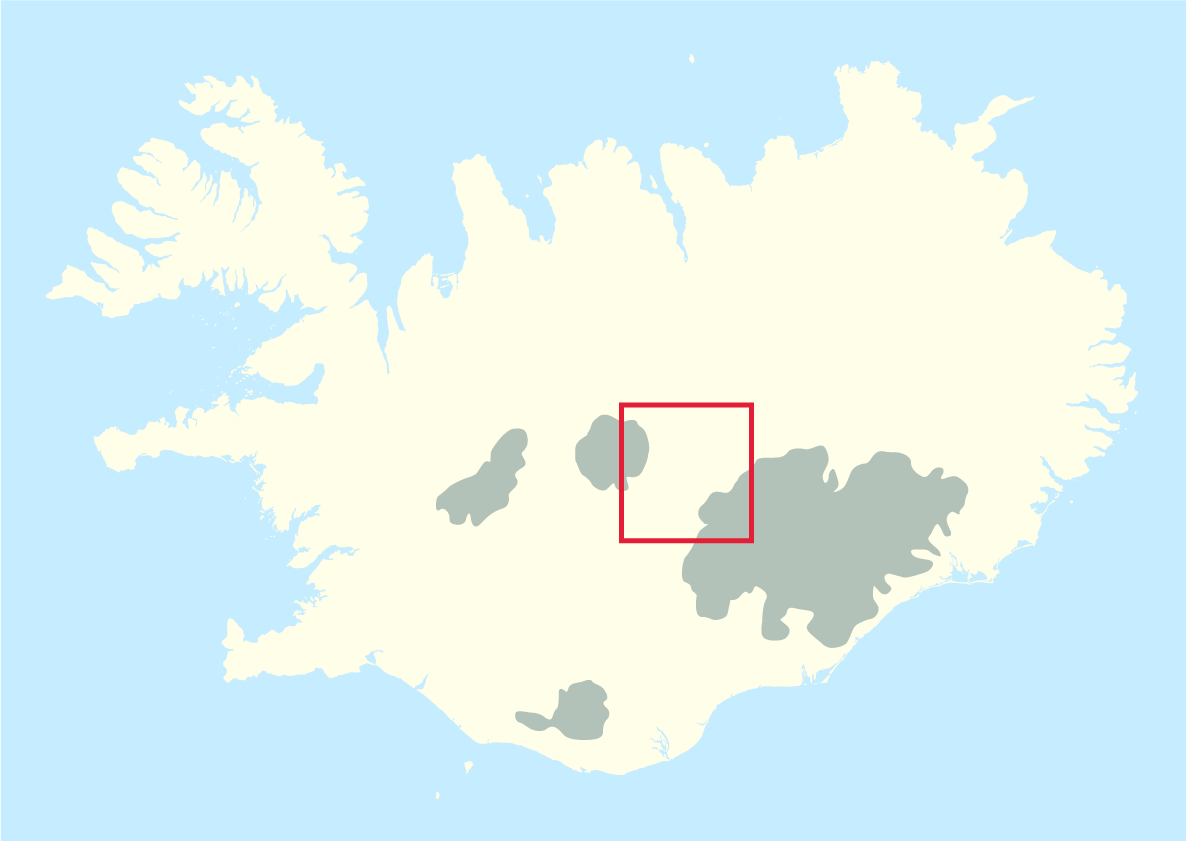
Location of the Sprengisandur highland area

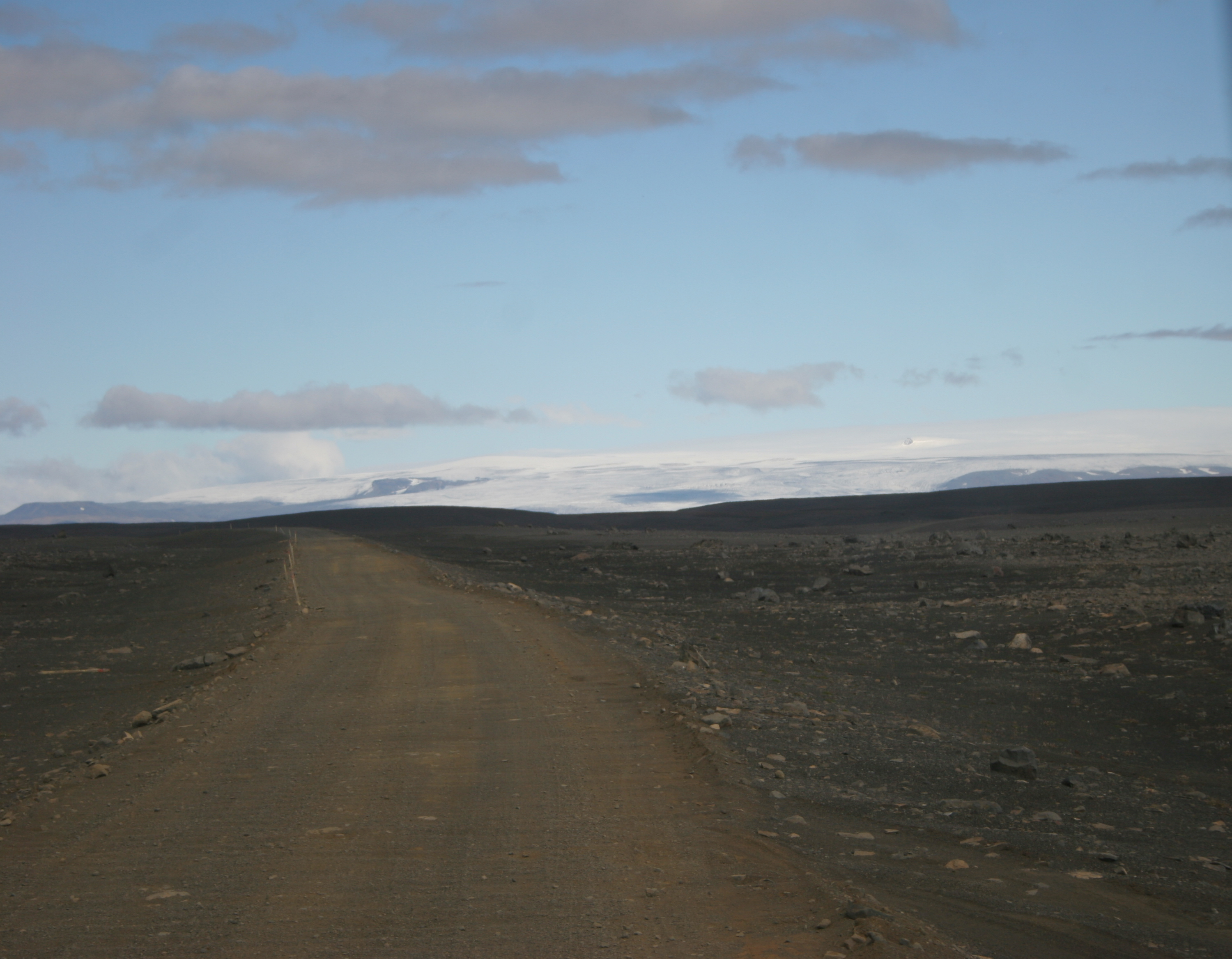
A view of Sprengisandur road with a view of Hofsjökull, in August

Sprengisandur (Icelandic pronunciation: [ˈspreiɲcɪˌsantʏr̥]) is a highland plateau in Iceland, defined roughly as the area between the Hofsjökull and Vatnajökull glaciers.

== History and etymology ==
Like Kjölur and Kaldidalur, Sprengisandur is an ancient pass - during the time of the Icelandic Free State (ca. 930–1265) it was one of the several important north–south routes that connected remote regions of the island to the Plains of the Parliament, Þingvellir, where the yearly parliament, Alþingi, was held each year at midsummer. In the sagas of Icelanders it is often called simply Sandr "Sand" or Sandleið, "Sand trail". At its southern end, it was joined with another such route, Fjallabaksvegur nyrðri, running west from Landmannalaugar mountain hot springs area.

Sprengisandur is only accessible during summer - like other parts of the inner desert, it is impassable in winter because of the snow, and in spring because of floods. While being the shortest way to the Alþingi for some Icelanders, for example, those living around lake Ljósavatn that is very close to the northern end of the route, and for inhabitants of Vopnafjörður, it had the downside of having by far the longest stretch through the forbidding inner desert regions among the other possible routes. For hundreds of kilometers, there was no fodder for horses to be had, and no human habitation to take shelter in. This feature gave the area its name: it is derived from Icelandic noun sandur "sand", which denotes the volcanic ash deserts of the center of the island, and the verb sprengja that means "to ride a horse to death; to be on the point of bursting after running for too long". One needed to ride as fast as possible, nearly driving the horses to death, to cross the mountain desert and reach the inhabited regions of the island again before one ran out of victuals.

Hence, Sprengisandur was, if at all possible, avoided by medieval Icelanders, even if it meant taking the longer route. One example is in ch. 8 of the Hrafnkels saga: the chieftain Hrafnkell, who lived in the East Fjords and rather close to the northern end of Sprengisandur, prefers to travel to the Alþingi by going south along the shore of the island - his route is much longer and slower, but it goes through inhabited regions for the entire route. His enemies, living in the same neighbourhood but needing speed, decide to take the shorter yet more exhausting Sprengisandur route, so as to arrive at the Alþingi much earlier and have enough time to drum up some support for their case. Another example is in Ölkofra þáttr, where the chieftain Broddi, who lives in Vopnafjörður, returns home from Alþingi by taking the Kjölur route north and then going east along the northern shore of the island - a much longer road home than one through Sprengisandur, yet one going largely through inhabited regions.

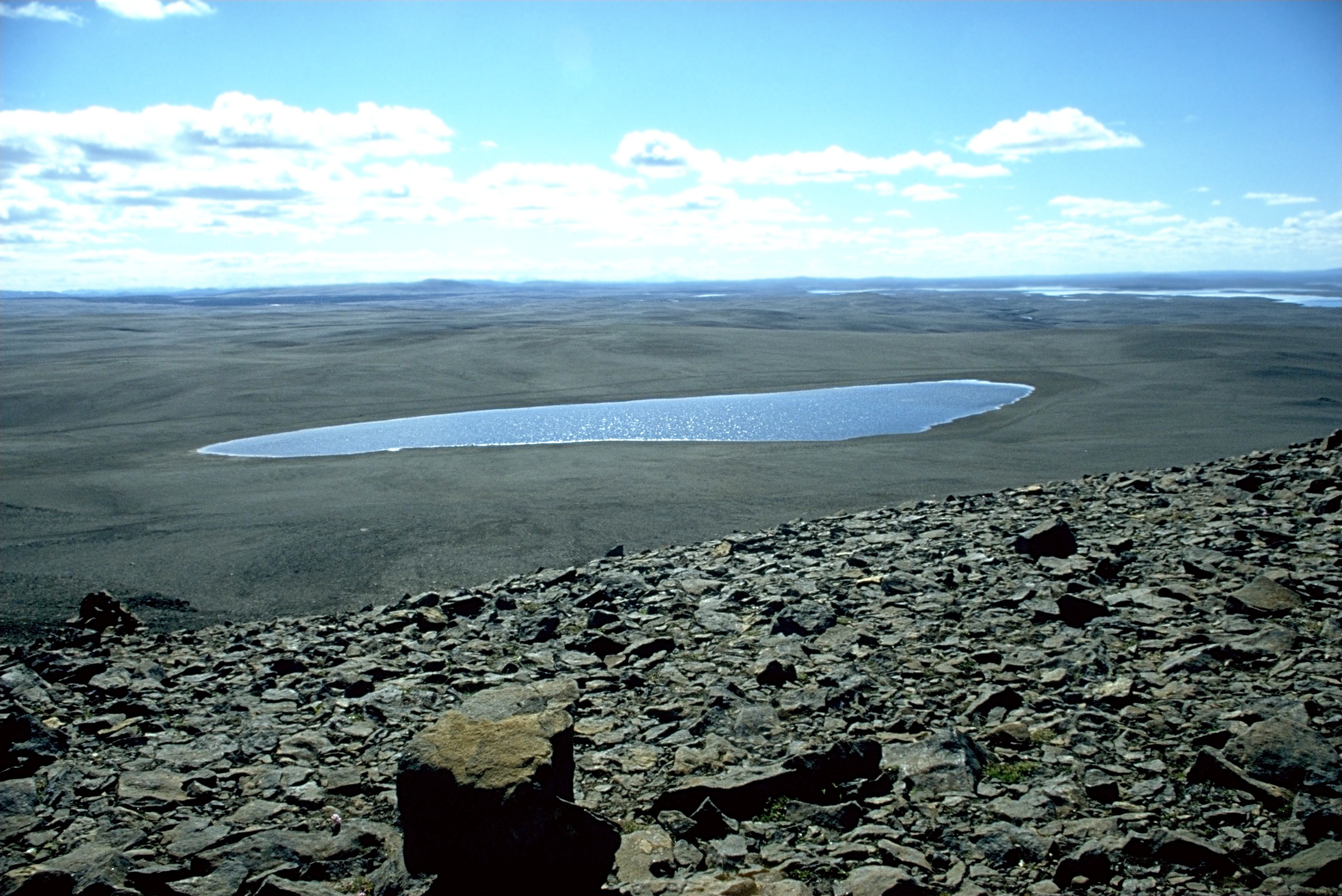
On Sprengisandur road

As usual with uninhabited places in Iceland, Sprengisandur route was considered to be haunted by ghosts. Both themes, the difficulty of passage and the presence of ghosts, are referred to in the famous Icelandic song Á Sprengisandi, written by Grímur Thomsen (1820–1896).

== Developments ==
After the loss of independence in 1265, the route gradually fell out of use and was lost until the 19th century. The modern gravel road goes more or less parallel and a bit southeast of the ancient horse trail. A tourist bus runs over the Sprengisandur every other day from Landmannalaugar to Mývatn and back in July and August. If the weather is good, the route offers views of both glaciers and volcanoes Askja and Herðubreið. In the middle of the track there is a hut of the Icelandic Hiking Club, Nýidalur.

== Transport ==
A gravel road called Sprengisandsleið runs through the area and connects Southern Region and Northeastern Region parts of the country. The road, and shorter tracks leading from the main road, are only open in the summer months.

A very remote airfield with two runways named Sprengisandur is located in the area (ICAO: BISP).
