= Þórisvatn =

Icelandic lake

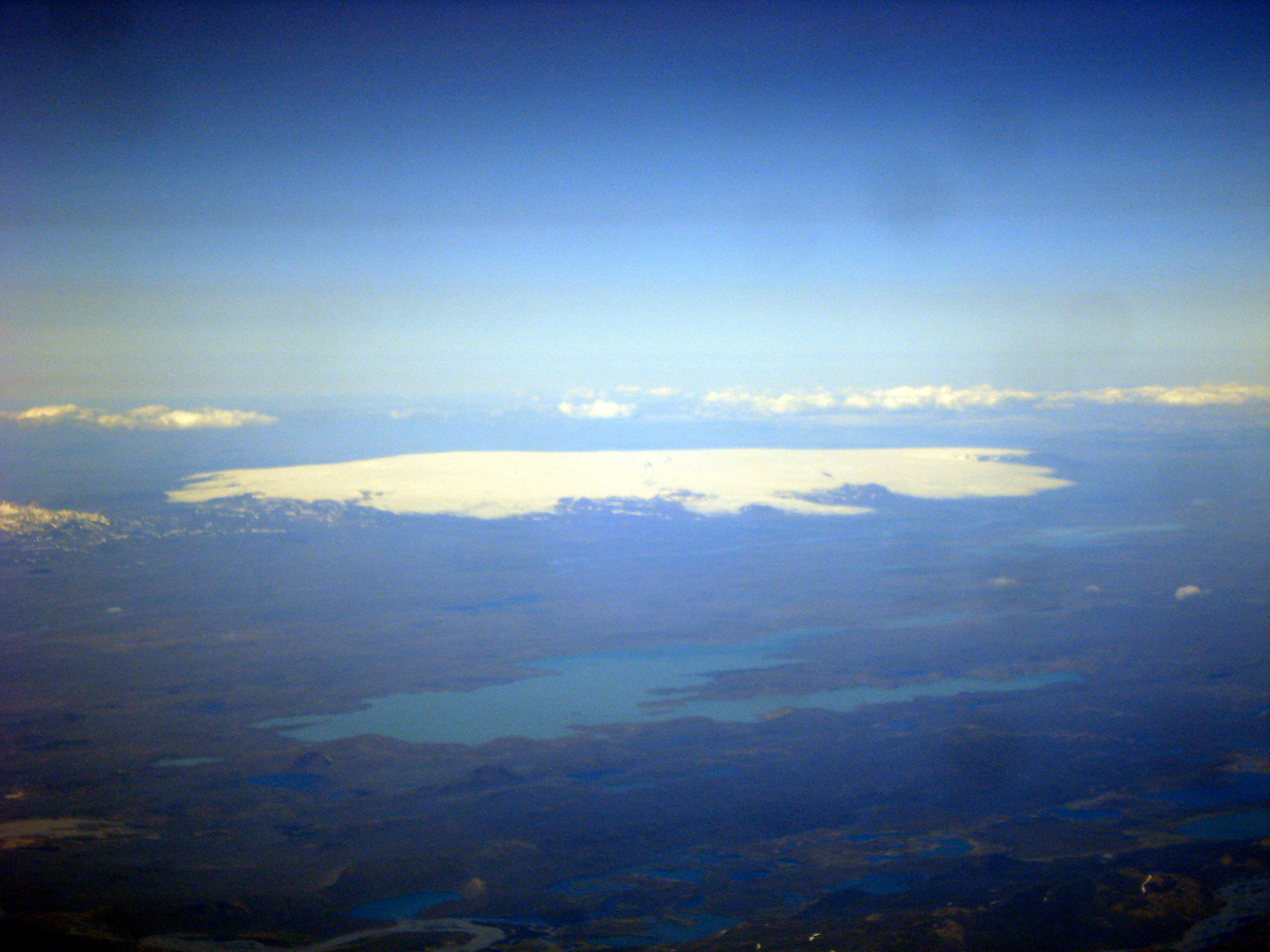

- Location within Iceland
- Coordinates: 64°14′N 18°55′W
- Primary inflows: Þjórsá
- Primary outflows: Þjórsá
- Basin countries: Iceland
- Surface area: 88 km^{2} (34 sq mi)
- Max. depth: 109 m (358 ft)

Þórisvatn (Icelandic pronunciation: [ˈθouːrɪsˌvahtn̥]; sometimes anglicized to Thorisvatn) is the largest lake of Iceland, situated at the south end of the Sprengisandur plateau within the highlands of Iceland.

It is a reservoir with a surface area of about 88 km^{2} (34 sq mi) and is fed by the river Þjórsá, which comes down from the glacier Hofsjökull. On its southern end, Þórisvatn is used to generate electricity at a power station. It is like other Icelandic lakes, which are mostly glacial lakes or volcanic lakes.

The lake grew from about 70 km^{2} to 86 km^{2} with the construction of the power station and was previously only the second largest lake in the country.

== See also ==
- List of lakes of Iceland
- Geography of Iceland
