= Air Operations Command (Argentina) =

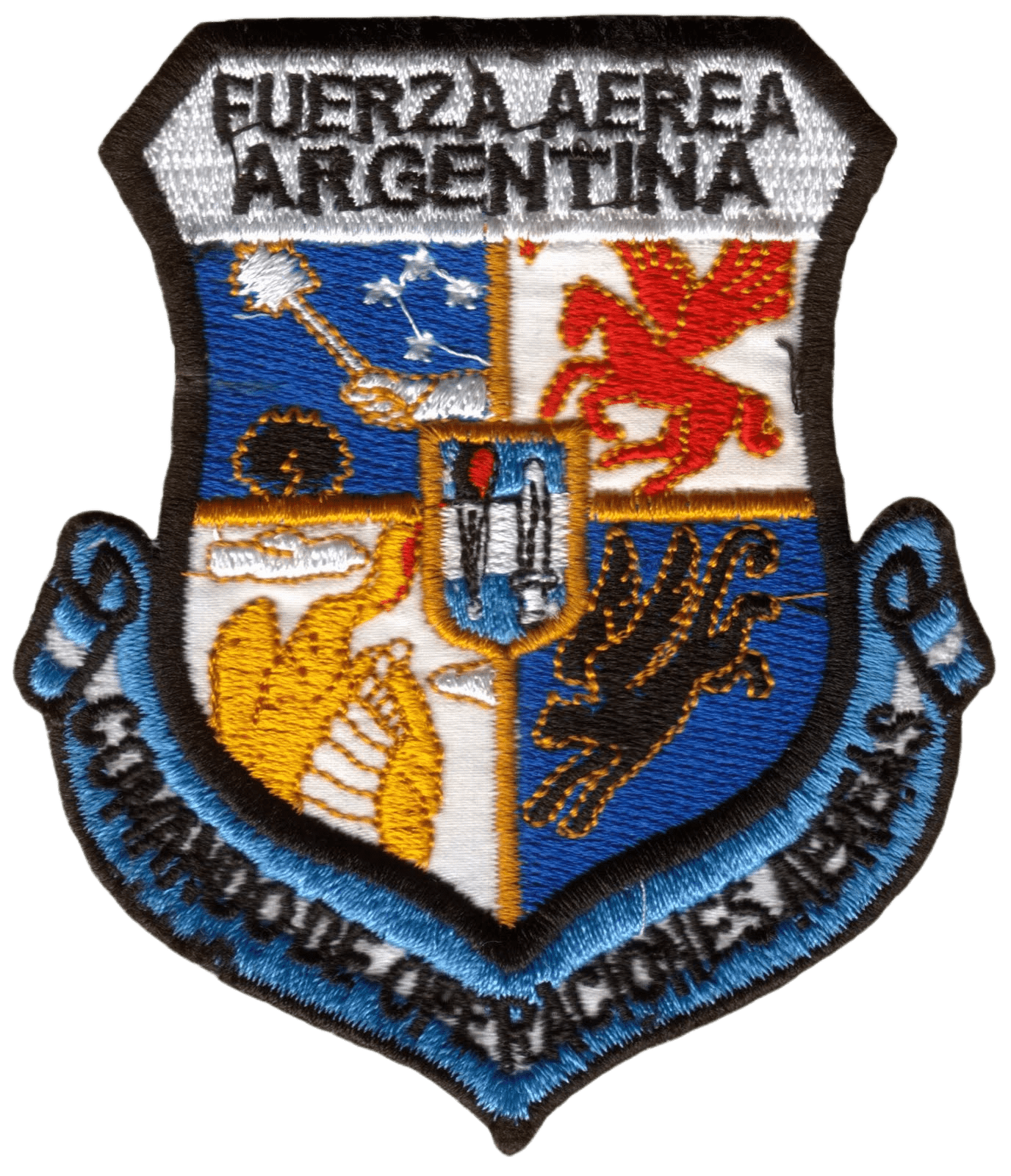
Air Force Training and Readiness Command

The Air Force Training and Readiness Command is a command of the Argentine Air Force based in the "Cóndor" Building, City of Buenos Aires.

== History ==
=== Organic ===
The Argentine Air Force created the Air Operations Command on December 15, 1966, over the Air Combat Command and the General Anti-Aircraft Defense Command. The military branch sought to grow its operational capacity while rationalizing it.

In 1968 the command established its headquarters in the Cóndor Building, Buenos Aires.

=== Operations ===
==== State terrorism ====
For the repression of the opponents, the Air Operations Command established the Internal Framework Group Command (CAMI) in order to lead the groups that operated in the provinces where there were Air Force units.

==== Malvinas War ====
The Air Operations Command led by Brigadier Major Hellmuth Weber prepared a contingency plan in January 1982 in case Argentina had war with the United Kingdom after Operation Rosario ordered by the Military Junta. This plan, called "Plan Blue and White", was ready on March 25, 1982. Weber managed to obtain permission from the dictator Leopoldo Fortunato Galtieri to deploy the Argentine Air Force to Patagonian airports. The COA established the Strategic Air Command.

On January 1, 2011, the Air Operations Command acquired the name "Air Force Training and Readiness Command."
