= Route F26 (Iceland) =

Road in Iceland

Route F26
- Sprengisandsleið
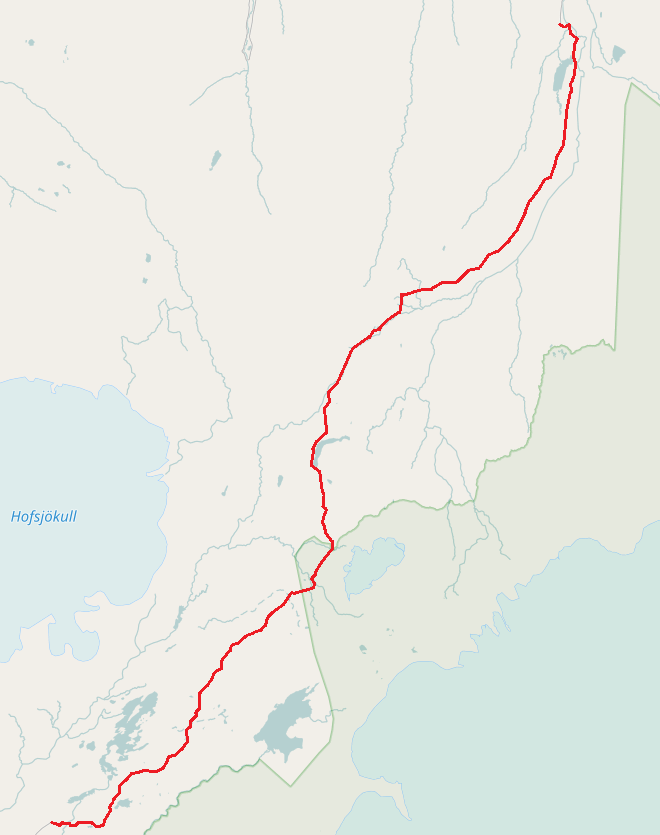

Route information
- Length: 154.5 km (96.0 mi)

Major junctions
- Northern end: Route 842 Bárðardalsvegur vestri
- Route F910 Austurleið; Route F752 Skagafjarðarleið; Route F881 Dragaleið
- Southern end: Route 26 Landvegur

Location
- Country: Iceland

Highway system
- Roads in Iceland

Route F26 or Sprengisandsleið (Icelandic pronunciation: [ˈspreiɲcɪˌsan(t)sˌleiːθ], lit. 'Sprengisandur Way') is a highland gravel road in Iceland, running through the Sprengisandur area between the glaciers Hofsjökull and Vatnajökull.

With its 200 km, it is the longest of the Icelandic highland roads. Its southern end is at the lake Þórisvatn, to the northeast of the volcano Hekla, and its northern end is the south part of Bárðardalur valley, to the southwest of lake Mývatn.

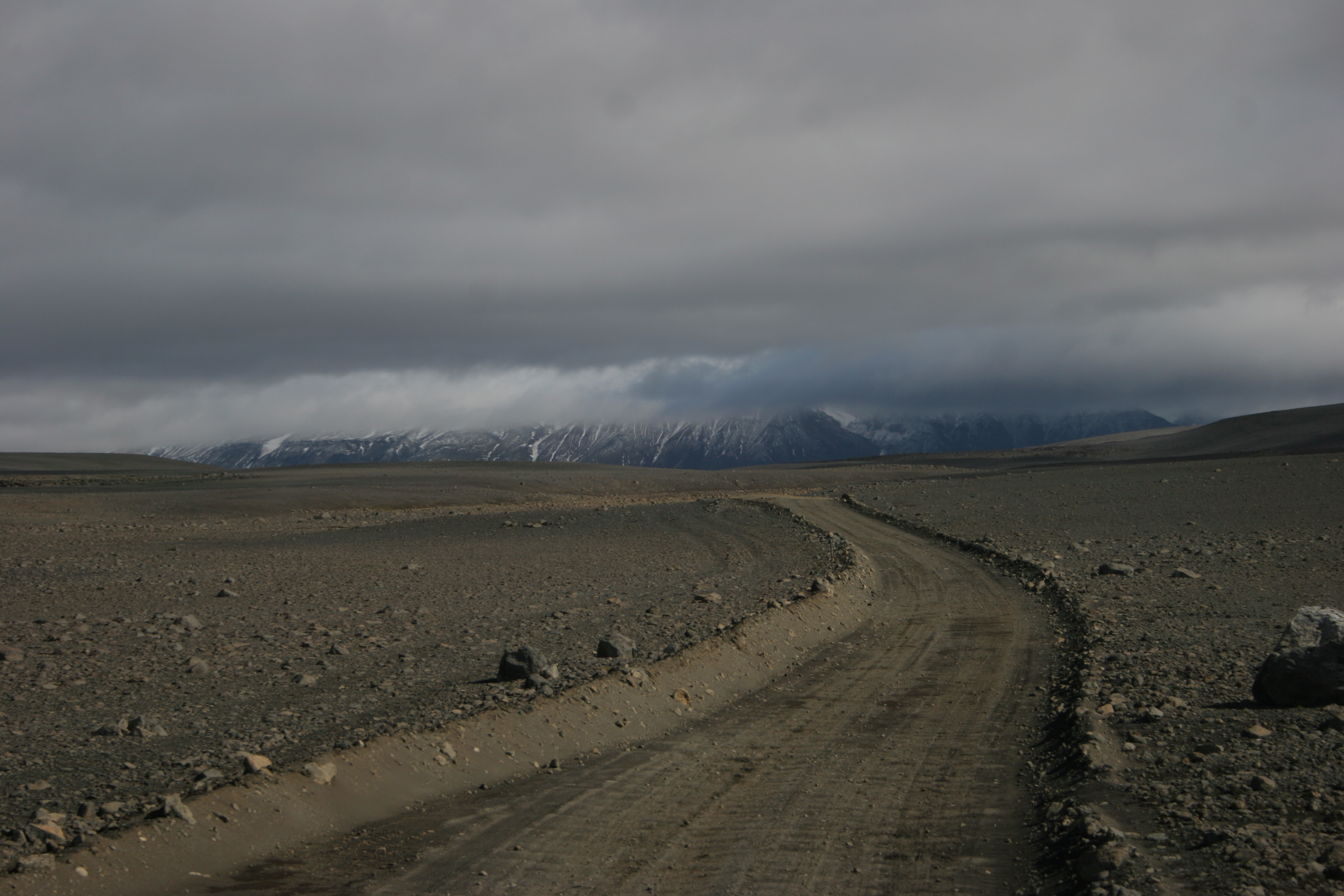
A view of Sprengisandur road with a view of Tungnaárjökull, a tongue of Vatnajökull, in August.
