= Fokker F26 =

Early Dutch jet airliner

F26
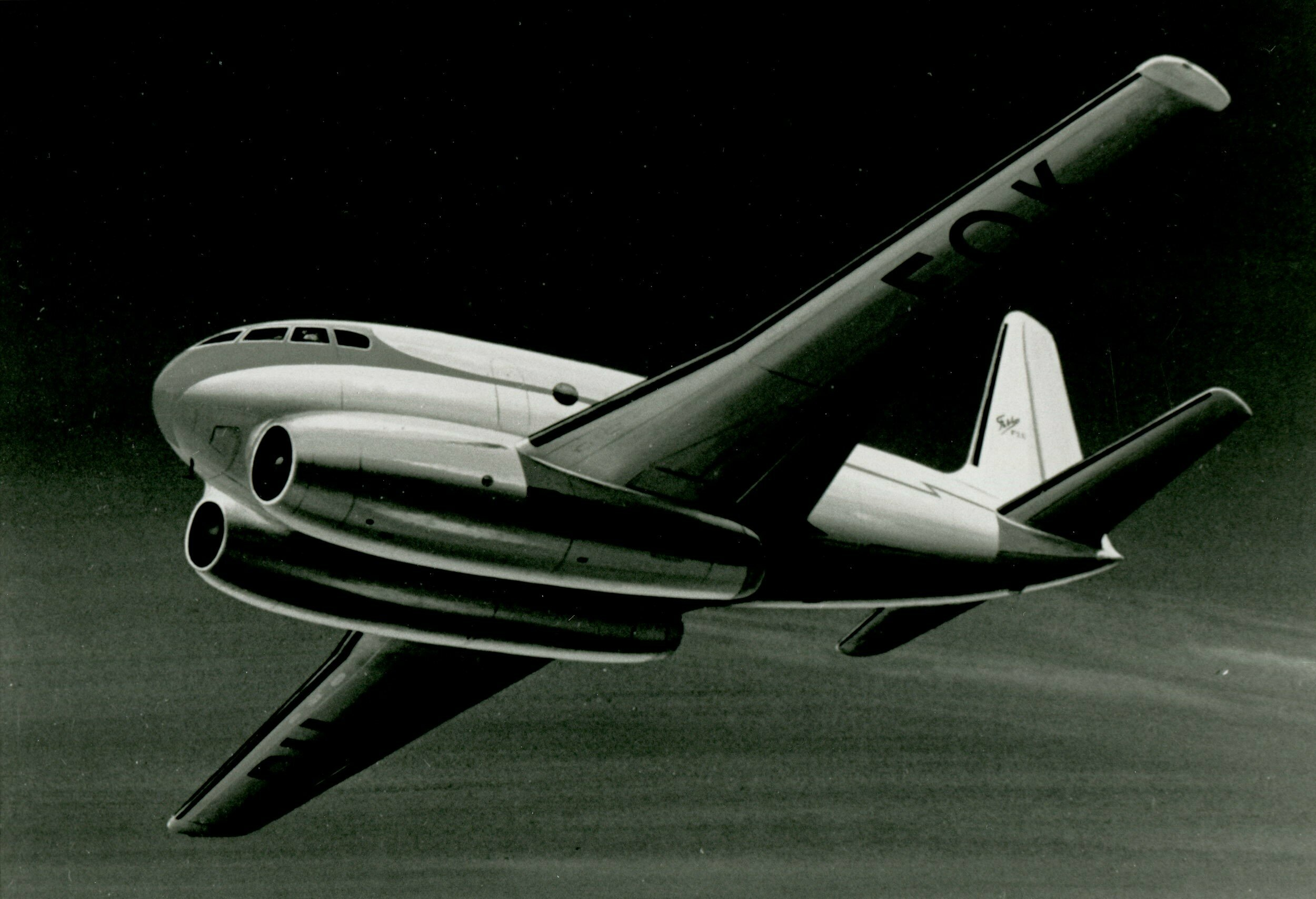
- Promotional image

General information
- Type: Jet airliner
- Manufacturer: Fokker
- Status: Concept only
- Number built: 0

History
- Introduction date: November 1946

Model of Fokker F.26 Phantom, 1/72 scale, International Resin Modellers Association

The Fokker F26 was an early jet airliner design created by the Dutch aircraft manufacturer, Fokker.

== Development ==
During the era before the Second World War, Fokker was one of the world's largest manufacturers of passenger aircraft. After the re-emergence of the Fokker company in 1945 (its founder, Anthony Fokker, had died in the United States in 1939), the company made ambitious plans for reconquering the market it once dominated. Therefore, in 1946, the company came up with a design of a jetliner.

The design materialised through cooperation between Fokker, the Dutch airline company KLM, and the Nationaal Instituut voor Vliegtuigontwikkeling (NVI - the Dutch national institute for aircraft development). Design progressed quickly and a model of the F26 was shown at the first postwar aviation fair, the Paris Air Show of November 1946. The model attracted a lot of interest, but no orders were gained.

Further development of the F26 was hampered by the attitude of KLM. KLM executive Mr Plesman believed that design, marketing and production of a jetliner was too big a project for Fokker alone. He therefore pushed Fokker for cooperation with British manufacturer de Havilland. Although some cooperation took place, mainly on engine-related issues, a combined effort in producing jetliners never took place. However, within ten years, Fokker would develop a more feasible design, the turboprop-powered F27 Friendship.

The F26 Phantom was a conceptual design that was to be a technical and economical feasibility study only. Therefore, the F26 was never intended to become reality. On the other hand, the Fokker Company expressed the expectation at the Paris Air Show of 1946 that the aircraft was about to fly in three years time. Regardless of what the real business expectation was, the significance of the F26 design lies in its early appearance. Although the aircraft industry in general considered jet-powered aircraft to be the future, no jet-powered passenger aircraft were designed by then.

== Design ==
The all-metal F26 design consisted of a low-wing layout with a 17-seat pressurized fuselage, a fully retractable gear and two Rolls-Royce Nene RB.41 series I jet engines. With a thrust of 23 kN (5,171 lbf) each, these engines were the most powerful engines available at the time. The aircraft was designed for a flight crew of three people.

The passenger cabin had a single aisle layout, with two seats abreast on the right and a single row on the left. A toilet was located in the aft of plane and there were two cargo bays. The aircraft was to be crewed by two pilots and one radio operator.

Based on design studies the F26 had an economical cruise speed of 800 km/h (497 mph) with a range of 1,000 km (621 mi).

== Specifications (Fokker F26 estimated) ==
Data from

General characteristics

- Crew: 3: Pilot, Copilot, Navigator
- Capacity: 17 passengers
- Length: 15.4 m (50 ft 6 in)
- Wingspan: 18.2 m (59 ft 9 in)
- Height: 5.9 m (19 ft 4 in)
- Empty weight: 6,300 kg (13,889 lb)
- Gross weight: 11,500 kg (25,353 lb)
- Fuel capacity: 3,230 kg (7,120 lb)
- Powerplant: 2 × Rolls-Royce RB.41 Nene centrifugal compressor turbojet, 23 kN (5,200 lbf) thrust each

Performance

- Cruise speed: 800 km/h (500 mph, 430 kn) at 12,000 m (39,000 ft)
- Range: 1,000 km (620 mi, 540 nmi) with 1,700 kg (3,700 lb) payload in a 50 km/h (27 kn; 31 mph) headwind
- Time to altitude: 12,000 m (39,000 ft) in 12 minutes 30 seconds
- Wing loading: 255 kg/m^{2} (52 lb/sq ft)

== See also ==
Related development

- Fokker F27
- Fokker F28
- Fokker 50
- Fokker 70
- Fokker 100

Aircraft of comparable role, configuration, and era

- Douglas DC-3

Related lists

- List of military aircraft of the United States
- List of civil aircraft
