= ISO 3166-2:IS =

Entry for Iceland in ISO 3166-2

ISO 3166-2:IS is the entry for Iceland in ISO 3166-2, part of the ISO 3166 standard published by the International Organization for Standardization (ISO), which defines codes for the names of the principal subdivisions (e.g., provinces or states) of all countries coded in ISO 3166-1.

Currently for Iceland, ISO 3166-2 codes are defined for eight regions and 64 municipalities.

Each code consists of two parts, separated by a hyphen. The first part is IS, the ISO 3166-1 alpha-2 code of Iceland and the second part is a digit (1–8) for regions or three letters for municipalities.

== Current codes ==
Subdivision names are listed as in the ISO 3166-2 standard published by the ISO 3166 Maintenance Agency (ISO 3166/MA).

Map of the regions of Iceland

=== Regions ===
Code	Subdivision name (is)	Subdivision name (en) (Note: For reference only, English name not included in the ISO 3166-2 standard.)
IS-7	Austurland	Eastern Region
IS-1	Höfuðborgarsvæði	Capital Region
IS-6	Norðurland eystra	Northeastern Region
IS-5	Norðurland vestra	Northwestern Region
IS-8	Suðurland	Southern Region
IS-2	Suðurnes	Southern Peninsula
IS-4	Vestfirðir	Westfjords
IS-3	Vesturland	Western Region

=== Municipalities ===
Code	Subdivision name (is)	Subdivision name (en)	Region
IS-AKN	Akraneskaupstaður	Akranes (Market) Town	3
IS-AKU	Akureyrarbær	Akureyri Town	6
IS-ARN	Árneshreppur	Arnes District	4
IS-ASA	Ásahreppur	Asa District	8
IS-BLA	Bláskógabyggð	Blaskoga Settlement	8
IS-BOL	Bolungarvíkurkaupstaður	Bolungarvik (Market) Town	4
IS-BOG	Borgarbyggð	Borgar Settlement	3
IS-DAB	Dalabyggð	Dala Settlement	3
IS-DAV	Dalvíkurbyggð	Dalvik Settlement	6
IS-EOM	Eyja- og Miklaholtshreppur	Eyja and Miklaholt District	3
IS-EYF	Eyjafjarðarsveit	Eyjafjordur Village	6
IS-FJL	Fjallabyggð	Fjalla Settlement	6
IS-FJD	Fjarðabyggð	Fjarda Settlement	7
IS-FLR	Fljótsdalshreppur	Fljotsdalur District	7
IS-FLA	Flóahreppur	Floa District	8
IS-GAR	Garðabær	Garda Town	1
IS-GOG	Grímsnes- og Grafningshreppur	Grimsnes and Grafnings District	8
IS-GRN	Grindavíkurbær	Grindavik Town	2
IS-GRU	Grundarfjarðarbær	Grundarfjordur Town	3
IS-GRY	Grýtubakkahreppur	Grytubakka District	6
IS-HAF	Hafnarfjarðarkaupstaður	Hafnarfjordur (Market) Town	1
IS-HRG	Hörgársveit	Horgar Village	6
IS-HRU	Hrunamannahreppur	Hrunamanna District	8
IS-HUG	Húnabyggð	Huna Settlement	5
IS-HUV	Húnaþing vestra	Western Hunathing	5
IS-HVA	Hvalfjarðarsveit	Hvalfjordur Village	3
IS-HVE	Hveragerðisbær	Hveragerdi Town	8
IS-ISA	Ísafjarðarbær	Isafjordur Town	4
IS-KAL	Kaldrananeshreppur	Kaldrananes District	4
IS-KJO	Kjósarhreppur	Kjosar District	1
IS-KOP	Kópavogsbær	Kopavogur Town	1
IS-LAN	Langanesbyggð	Langanes Settlement	6
IS-MOS	Mosfellsbær	Mosfell Town	1
IS-MUL	Múlaþing	Mulathing	7
IS-MYR	Mýrdalshreppur	Myrdalur District	8
IS-NOR	Norðurþing	Nordurthing	6
IS-RGE	Rangárþing eystra	Eastern Rangarthing	8
IS-RGY	Rangárþing ytra	Outer Rangarthing	8
IS-RHH	Reykhólahreppur	Reykhola District	4
IS-RKN	Reykjanesbær	Reykjanes Town	2
IS-RKV	Reykjavíkurborg	Reykjavik City	1
IS-SEL	Seltjarnarnesbær	Seltjarnarnes Town	1
IS-SKF	Skaftárhreppur	Skaftar District	8
IS-SKG	Skagabyggð	Skaga Settlement	5
IS-SKR	Skagafjörður	Skagafjordur	5
IS-SOG	Skeiða- og Gnúpverjahreppur	Skeida and Gnupverja District	8
IS-SKO	Skorradalshreppur	Skorradalur District	3
IS-SNF	Snæfellsbær	Snaefell Town	3
IS-STR	Strandabyggð	Stranda Settlement	4
IS-STY	Stykkishólmsbær	Stykkisholmur Town	3
IS-SDV	Súðavíkurhreppur	Sudavik District	4
IS-SDN	Suðurnesjabær	Sudurnesja Town	2
IS-SBT	Svalbarðsstrandarhreppur	Svalbardsstrond District	6
IS-SFA	Sveitarfélagið Árborg	Arborg Township	8
IS-SHF	Sveitarfélagið Hornafjörður	Hornafjordur Township	7
IS-SOL	Sveitarfélagið Ölfus	Olfus Township	8
IS-SSS	Sveitarfélagið Skagaströnd	Skagastrond Township	5
IS-SVG	Sveitarfélagið Vogar	Vogar Township	2
IS-TAL	Tálknafjarðarhreppur	Talknafjordur District	4
IS-TJO	Tjörneshreppur	Tjornes District	6
IS-VEM	Vestmannaeyjabær	Vestmannaeyja Town	8
IS-VER	Vesturbyggð	Western Settlement	4
IS-VOP	Vopnafjarðarhreppur	Vopnafjordur District	7
IS-THG	Þingeyjarsveit	Thingeyjar Village	6

== Changes ==
The following changes to the entry are listed on ISO's online catalogue, the Online Browsing Platform:

Effective date of change	Short description of change (en)
2015-11-27	Deletion of region IS-0
2020-11-24	Addition of category municipality; Addition of municipality IS-AKH, IS-AKN, IS-AKU, IS-ARN, IS-ASA, IS-BFJ, IS-BLA, IS-BLO, IS-BOG, IS-BOL, IS-DAB, IS-DAV, IS-DJU, IS-EOM, IS-EYF, IS-FJD, IS-FJL, IS-FLA, IS-FLD, IS-FLR, IS-GAR, IS-GOG, IS-GRN, IS-GRU, IS-GRY, IS-HAF, IS-HEL, IS-HRG, IS-HRU, IS-HUT, IS-HUV, IS-HVA, IS-HVE, IS-ISA, IS-KAL, IS-KJO, IS-KOP, IS-LAN, IS-MOS, IS-MYR, IS-NOR, IS-RGE, IS-RGY, IS-RHH, IS-RHN, IS-RKV, IS-SBH, IS-SBT, IS-SDN, IS-SDV, IS-SEL, IS-SEY, IS-SFA, IS-SHF, IS-SKF, IS-SKG, IS-SKO, IS-SKU, IS-SNF, IS-SOG, IS-SOL, IS-SSF, IS-SSS, IS-STR, IS-STY, IS-SVG, IS-TAL, IS-THG, IS-TJO, IS-VEM, IS-VER, IS-VOP; Update List Source; Update Code Source
2021-11-25	Deletion of municipality IS-BFJ, IS-DJU, IS-FLD, IS-SEY; Addition of municipality IS-MUL; Update List Source
2022-11-29	Deletion of municipality IS-AKH, IS-BLO, IS-HEL, IS-HUT, IS-SBH, IS-SKU, IS-SSF; Addition of municipality IS-HUG, IS-SKR

== See also ==
- Administrative divisions of Iceland
- FIPS region codes of Iceland
- NUTS statistical regions of Iceland
