= Búrfell (disambiguation) =

Búrfell is a name used for about 30 or more hills or mountains in Iceland. The Icelandic word búr means cage or pantry in English. Amongst other uses it may refer to:

- Búrfell (Þjórsárdal) a tuya near the Þjórsá River in central Iceland
  - Búrfell hydroelectric power station on the Þjórsá River
- Búrfell (Garðabær) a volcanic splatter cone on Reykjanes peninsula, South-west Iceland
- Búrfell (Tjörneshreppur) near coast in northern Iceland
- Búrfell (Grýtubakkahreppur) near coast in northern Iceland
- Búrfell (Skagafjörður) north-west of Hofsjökull in north central Iceland
- More than one Búrfell in Skagafjörður near the coast in north central Iceland
- Búrfell (Þingeyjarsveit) in north central Iceland
- Búrfell (Mosfellsbær) east of Reykjavík
- Búrfell (Grímsnes or Grafningshreppur) to the north of the Grímsnes volcano in South-west Iceland
- Búrfell (Norðurþing) in North-west Iceland
- More than one Búrfell in Ísafjarðarbær in North-west Iceland
- Búrfell (Árneshreppur) at the head of Reykjarfjörður in North-west Iceland
- Búrfell (Vesturbyggð) in North-west Iceland
- Búrfell (Strandabyggð) in North-west Iceland
- Búrfell (Húnabyggð) in North-west Iceland
- Búrfell (Vesturbyggð) in North-west Iceland
- Búrfell (Dalabyggð) in North-west Iceland
- Búrfell (Húnaþing vestra) near coast in North-west Iceland
- more than one Búrfell in Múlaþing in Eastern Iceland
- Búrfell (Fjarðabyggð) near coast in Eastern Iceland
- More than one Búrfell in Borgarbyggð in Western Iceland
- Búrfell (Bláskógabyggð) north-west of Þingvallavatn in South-east Iceland
- Búrfell (Mýrdalshreppur) south of Mýrdalsjökull in South-east Iceland
- Búrfell (Snæfellsbær) north of Snæfellsjökull volcano in South-east Iceland
