= Skagabyggð =

Municipality in Iceland

- Former municipality
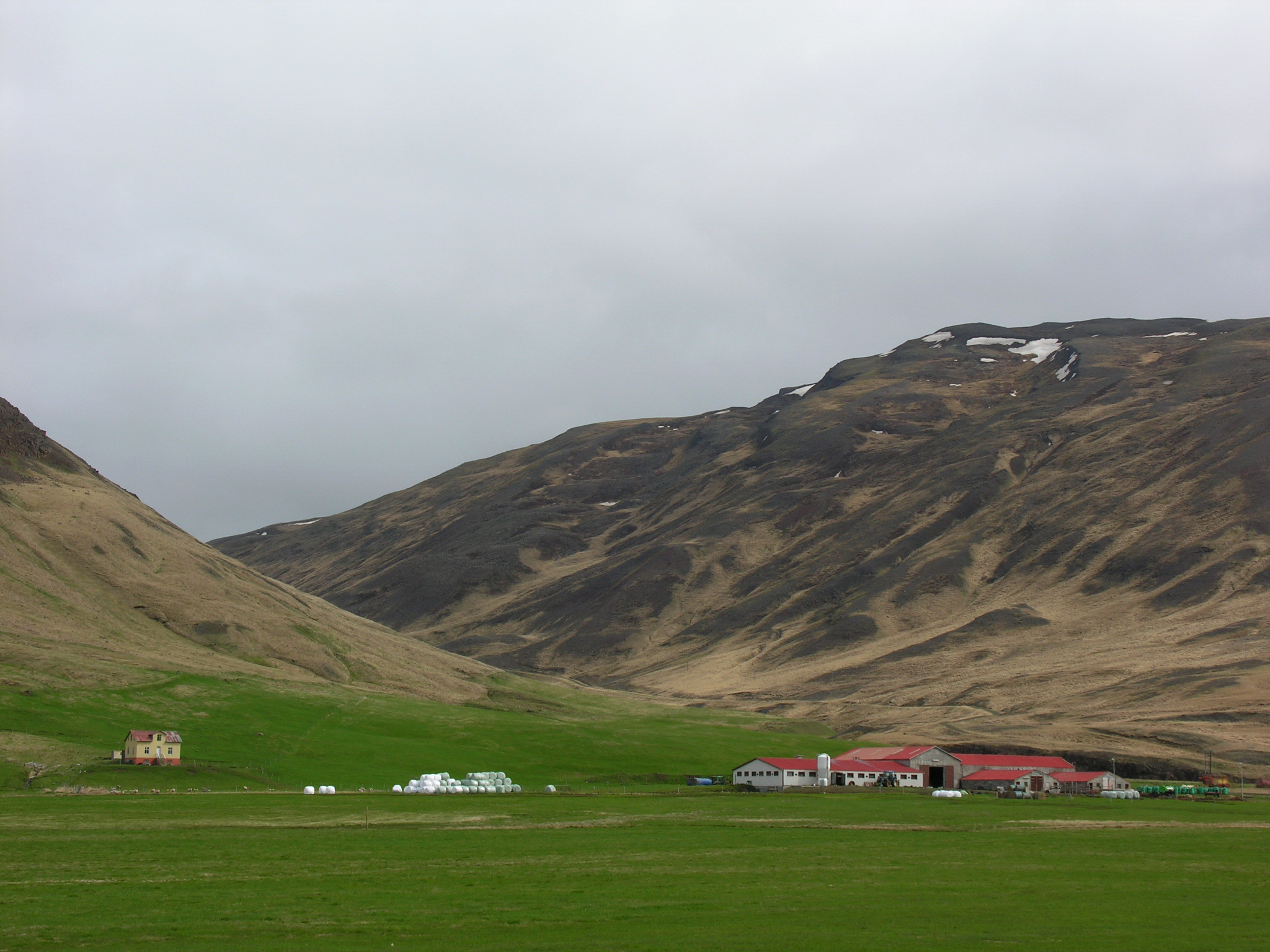
- Skyline of Skagabyggð

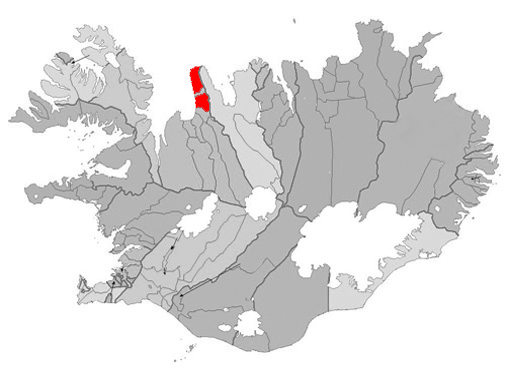
- Location of Skagabyggð

- Location within Iceland
- Coordinates: 65°54′25″N 20°16′44″W
- Country: Iceland
- Region: Northwestern Region
- Constituency: Northwest Constituency

Area
  - Total: 489 km^{2} (189 sq mi)

Population (2024)
  - Total: 86
  - Density: 0.18/km^{2} (0.46/sq mi)
- Municipal number: 5611

Skagabyggð (Icelandic pronunciation: [ˈskaːɣaˌpɪɣθ]) is a former municipality in Iceland. It consisted of two noncontiguous areas which surrounded the municipality of Skagaströnd. In June 2021, residents rejected a proposal to merge the municipality with the neighboring municipalities of Skagaströnd, Blönduósbær and Húnavatnshreppur.

In June 2024, 90% of Húnabyggð voters and 75% of Skagabyggð voters approved a merger wherein the two municipalities would combine into a larger municipality, also known as Húnabyggð. The merger took effect in August 2024.
