= Húnaflói =

Bay of Iceland

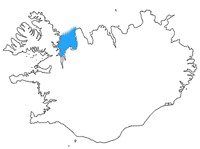
- Location of Húnaflói in Iceland
- Interactive map of Húnaflói
- Location: Northwestern Region and Westfjords
- Coordinates: 65°50′N 20°50′W
- Type: Bay
- Etymology: húnn meaning 'polar bear cub' + flói meaning 'bay'
- Ocean/sea sources: Iceland Sea
- Max. length: 100 km (60 mi)
- Max. width: 50 km (30 mi)
- Surface area: 188.8 km^{2} (70 sq mi)
- Islands: Grímsey; Hrútey
- Settlements: Blönduós; Drangsnes; Hólmavík; Hvammstangi; Skagaströnd

Húnaflói (Icelandic pronunciation: [ˈhuːnaˌflouːɪ], lit. 'Polar Bear Cub Bay') is a bay of the Iceland Sea in Northwestern Region and Westfjords, Iceland. It is situated between the village of Strandir on Vestfirðir peninsula to the west and the Skagaströnd of Skagi peninsula to the east. Spanning 188.8 km^{2} (70 sq mi), it has a maximum width of about 50 km (30 mi) and length of 100 km (60 mi).

The Battle of the Gulf (Icelandic: Flóabardagi) was a naval battle on 25 June 1244 in Húnaflói, during the Age of the Sturlungs civil war. A detailed description of the battle can be found in Sturlunga saga.

== Geography ==
Map identifying major bodies of water, landforms, and some settlements of Húnaflói

=== Fjords ===
The major features of Húnaflói are its seven fjords and the Vatnsnes peninsula. Along Strandir (lit. 'The Coast') of eastern Vestfirðir, four fjords branch from the western Húnaflói (listed north to south): Bjarnarfjörður, Steingrímsfjörður, Kollafjörður, and Bitrufjörður. Steingrímsfjörður is the largest of Strandir's fjords, curving 28 km (17 mi) into the countryside.

In the southwest of Húnaflói is the 36 km (22 mi) long Hrútafjörður, the bay's longest fjord. The southern tip of Hrútafjörður traditionally marked the boundary between the regions of Vestfjörður and Norðurland.

Immediately east of Hrútafjörður is Miðfjörður. The fjord is fed by the Miðfjarðará (lit. 'Miðfjörður River'), one of Iceland's most productive salmon rivers.

Continuing east is the Vatnsnes peninsula, which forms the western edge of Húnafjörður, the largest fjord of Húnaflói. Skagi Peninsula is the eastern extent of Húnafjörður and of the entire Húnaflói. ('Coast of Skagi' or lit. 'Coast of the Peninsula')

=== Settlements and other features ===
Húnaflói and much of its geography are documented in Landnámabók and several sagas of Icelanders, including Gull-Þóris saga, Gísla saga, Grettis saga, and Vatnsdæla saga, among others. Together, the historical record and corroborating archaeological evidence suggest that continuous human presence in Húnaflói started during the settlement of Iceland in the late ninth century.

Today, Húnaflói supports a population in the low thousands and has several localities of more than one hundred inhabitants. The population centers are all situated along fjords, excepting the village of Skagaströnd, which lies directly on the eastern shore of Húnaflói.

Map detail of Bjarnarfjörður, Steingrímsfjörður, and Kollafjörður with the villages Hólmavík and Drangsnes, and the island Grímsey

Steingrímsfjörður in the Westfjords supports two settlements, Drangsnes and Hólmavík. The largest settlement on Strandir, Hólmavík, has 302 residents and forms the municipality of Strandabyggð's urban nucleus. Situated near the mid-point of Steingrímsfjörður's fertile southern shore, it is surrounded by farmland.

Drangsnes sits at the northeastern point of Steingrímsfjörður, where it meets Húnaflói. The hamlet is the largest settlement in Kaldrananeshreppur despite having just 71 inhabitants. Several kilometers west of Drangsnes is Strákatangi, the site of a 17th-century Basque whaling station where whales were processed before being shipped.

The 49 ha (120 acres) island Grímsey sits less than 2 km (1.2 mi) off the coast of Drangsnes. According to Landnámabók, the island was named after Grími Ingjaldssyni Hróaldssonar from Haddingjadal, who overwintered on the island and drowned while rowing to the mainland. The island's name is often elaborated as Grímsey á Steingrímsfirði (lit. 'Grímsey on Steingrímsfjörður') to distinguish it from the larger island of the same name in Akureyri municipality.

Historically, the southern point of Hrútafjörður marked the border between the counties of Strandasysla and Vestur-Húnavatnssýsla. Since 1 January 2012, all of Hrútafjörður falls within the municipality of Húnaþing vestra in the Northwestern Region. The hamlet of Borðeyri, which had a population of sixteen in 2018, is located on the western coast of Hrútafjörður and the largest settlement in Húnaþing vestra – Hvammstangi (pop. 625) is found along eastern Miðfjörður. The village of Laugarbakki (pop. 55) is situated slightly less than 3 km (1.9 mi) south of Miðfjörður on the Miðfjarðará.

The small town of Blönduós in Húnabyggð and the village of Skagaströnd in Sveitarfélagið Skagaströnd are found on the eastern coast of Húnafjörður. The southern coast of Húnafjörður is defined by the Þingeyrasandur, a shoal that separates the Hóp tidal lagoon from the Húnaflói. Þingeyrasandur is itself defined by the "lakes" Sigríðarstaðavatn on the west and Húnavatn on the east.

== Fauna ==
The bay has been proposed as a protected area for harbor seals.

Grímsey á Steingrímsfirði hosts a colony of 25–30 thousand breeding pairs of Atlantic puffins, accounting for more than 1% of the puffin population in Iceland.

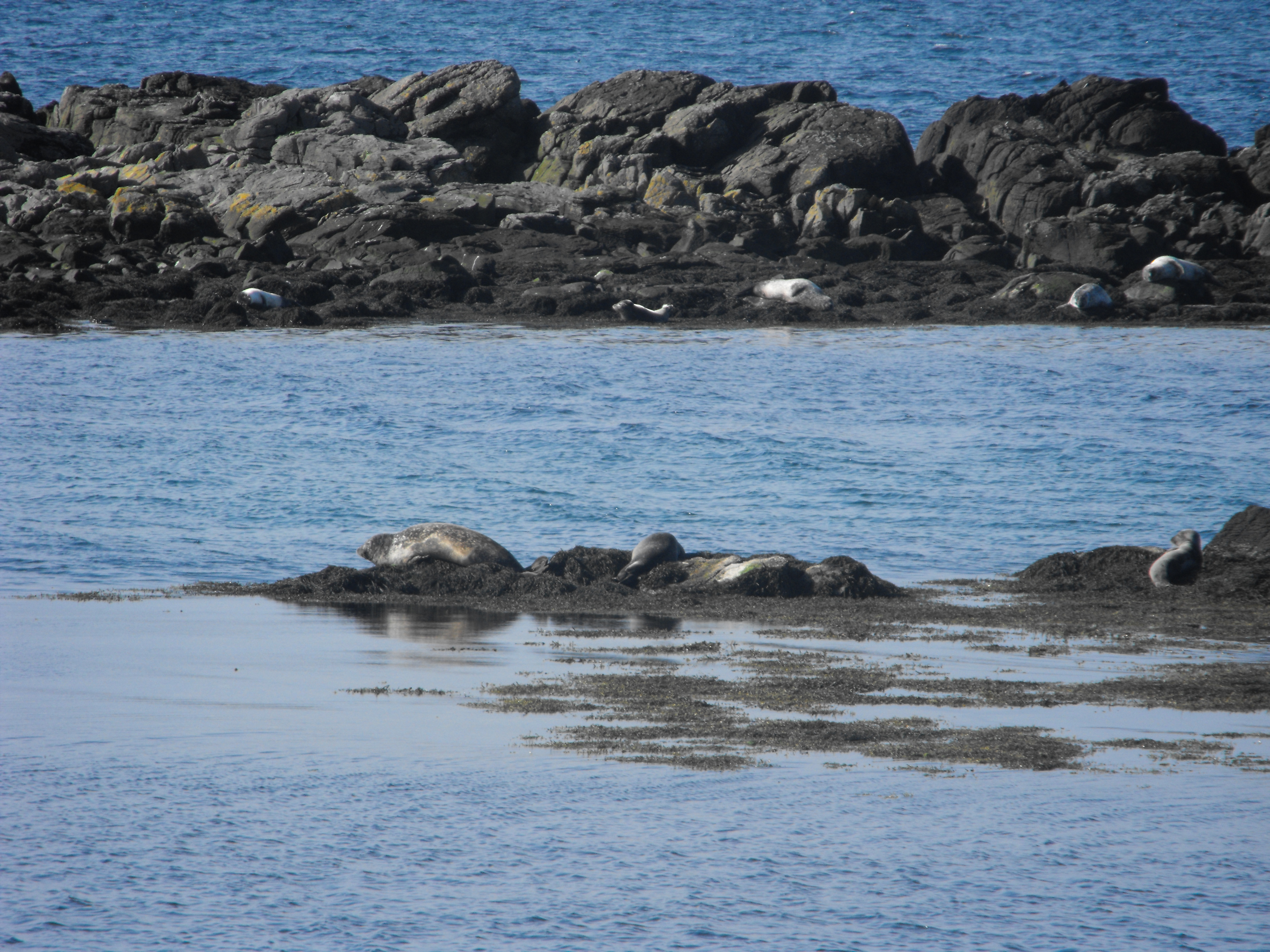
Harbor seals in Hindisvík

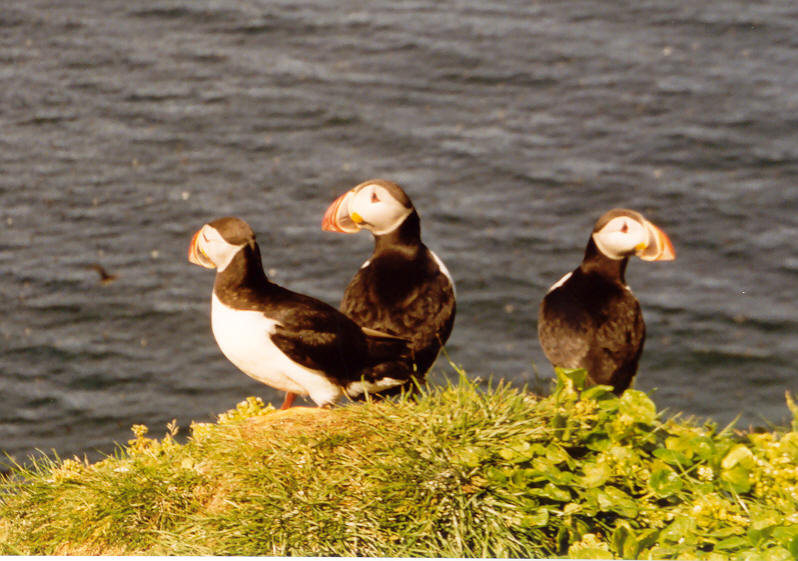
Atlantic puffins on Grímsey á Steingrímsfirði

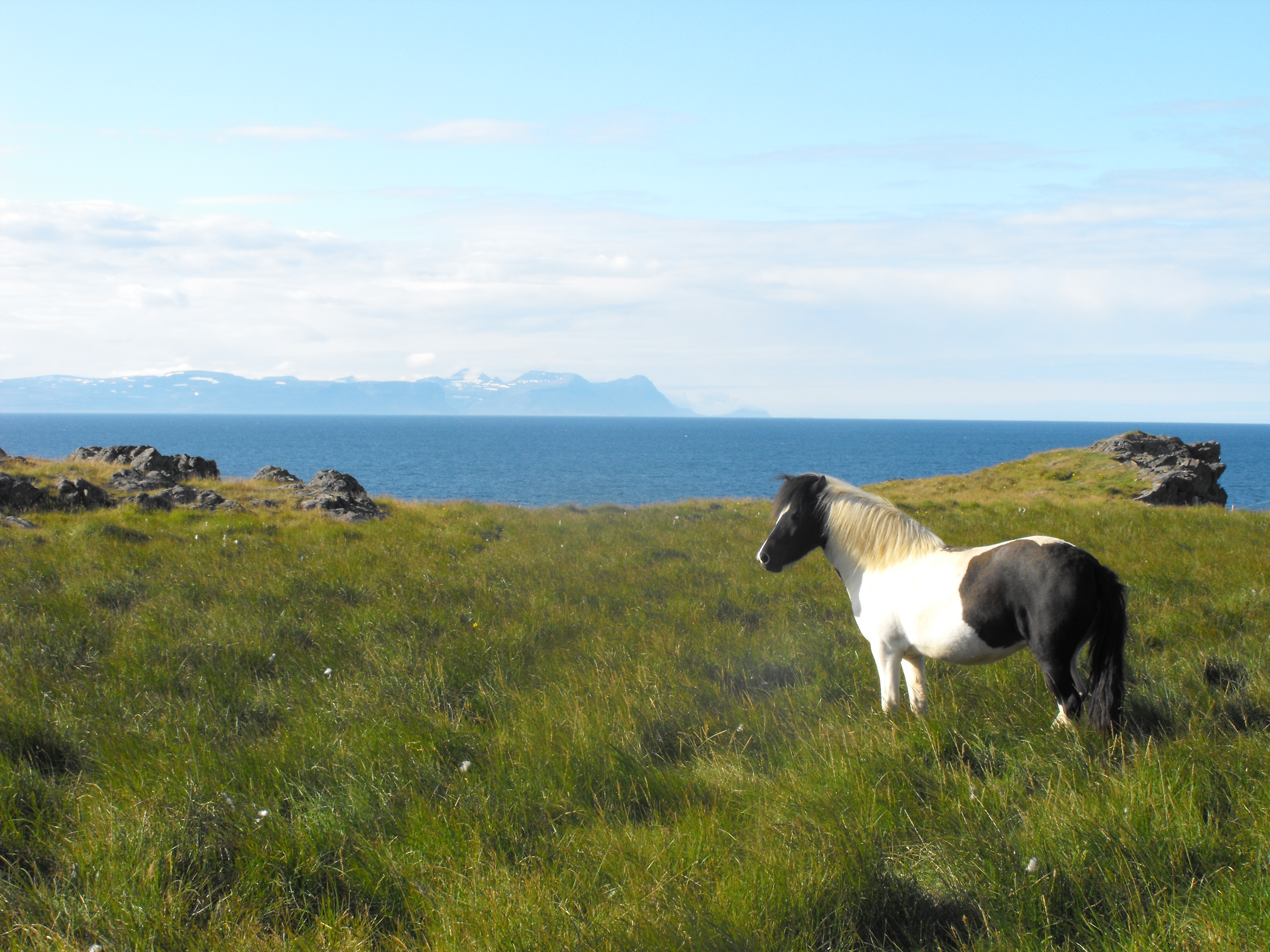
An Icelandic horse by the Húnaflói

== Gallery ==
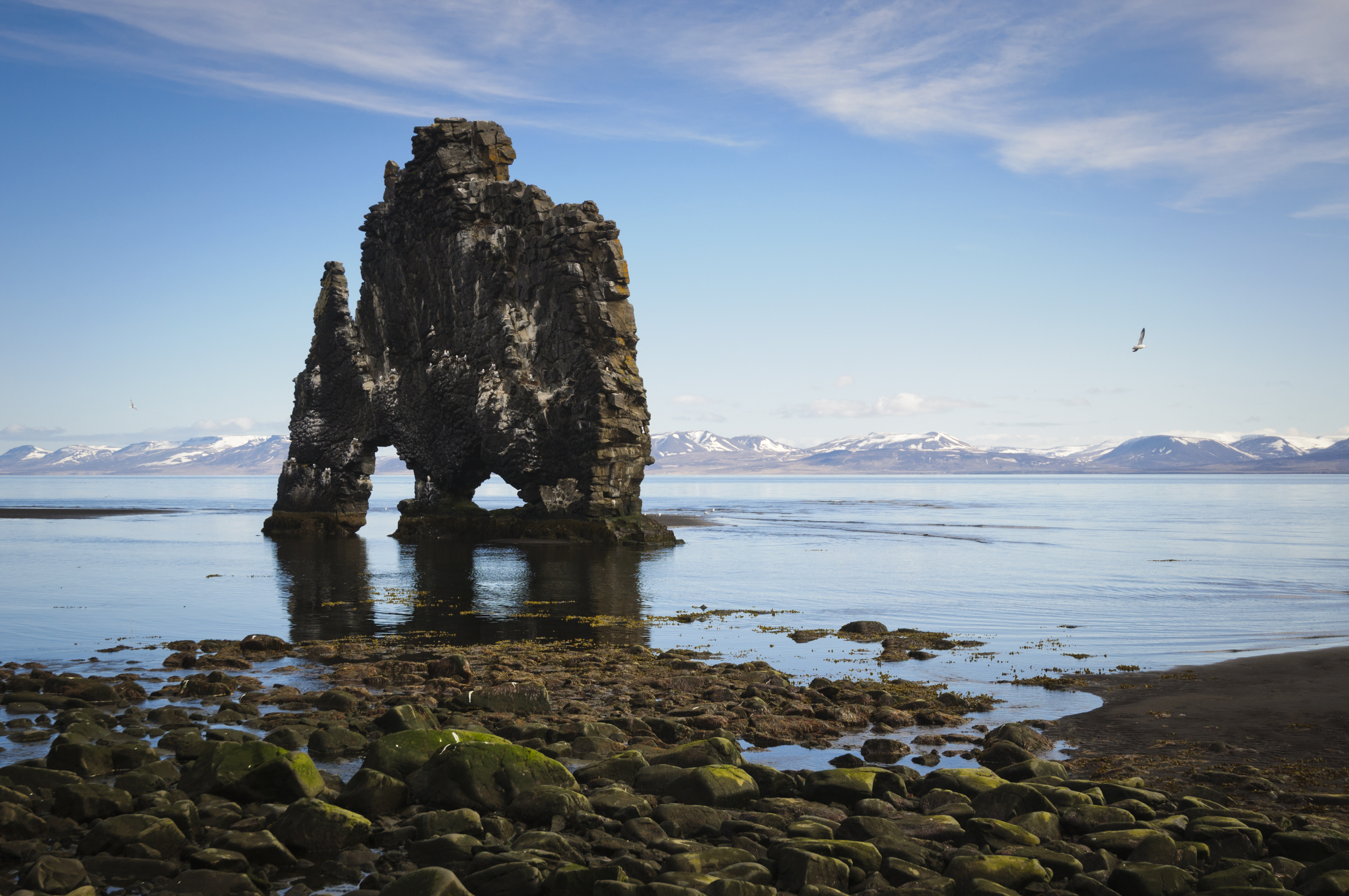
Hvítserkur basalt stack along the eastern shore of the Vatnsnes

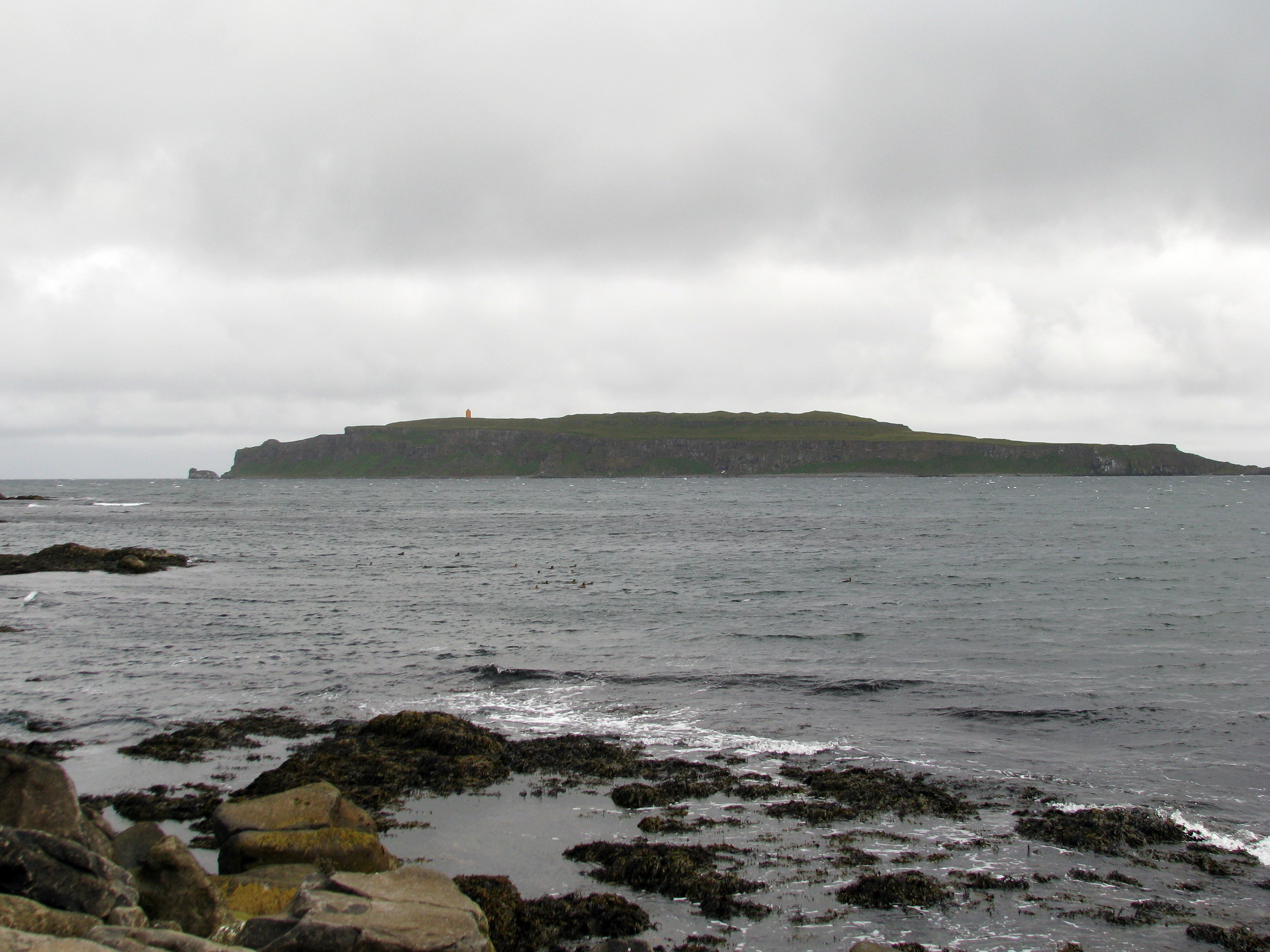
Grímsey á Steingrímsfirði as seen from the coast near Drangsnes

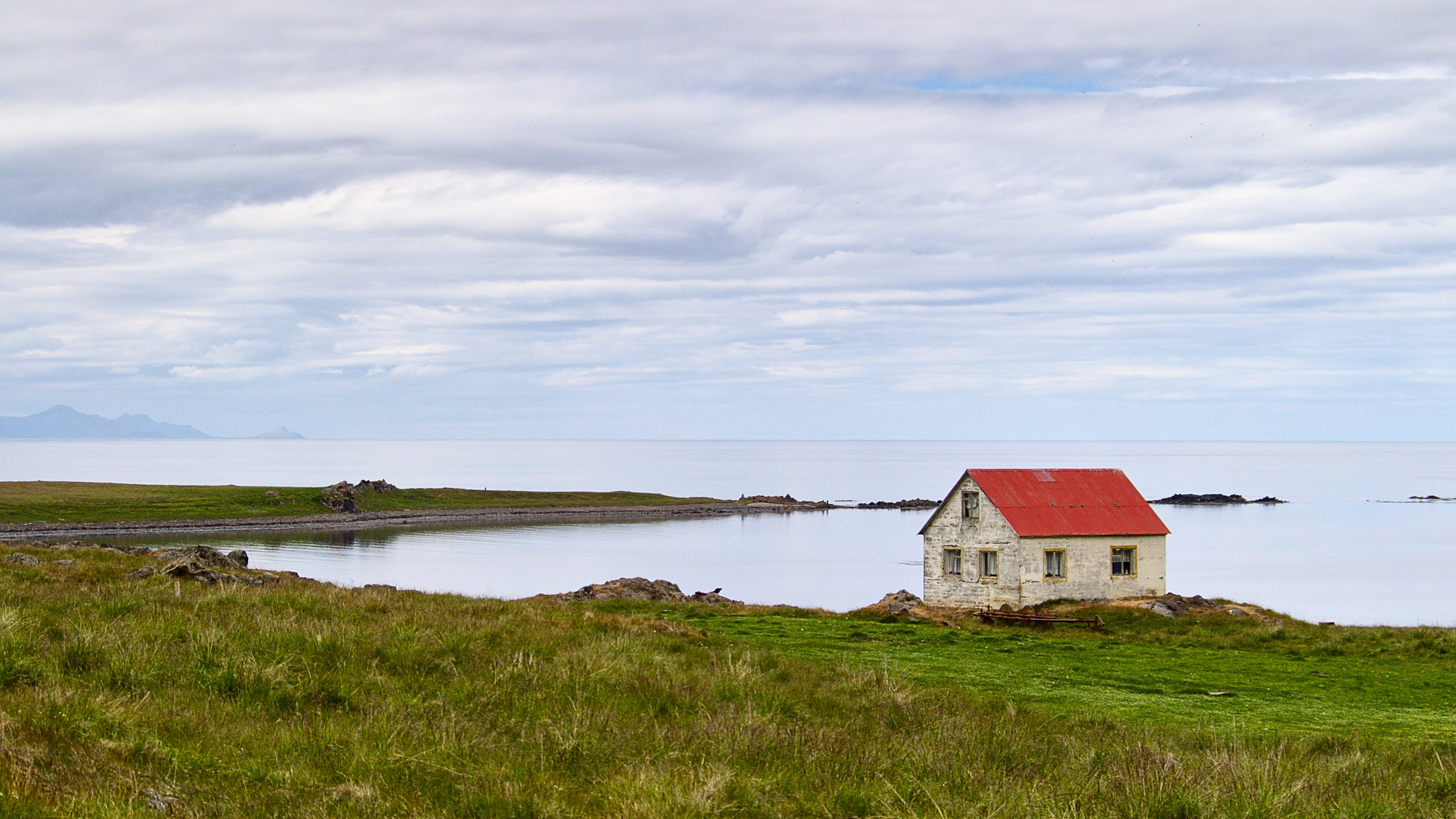
Blönduóshreppur

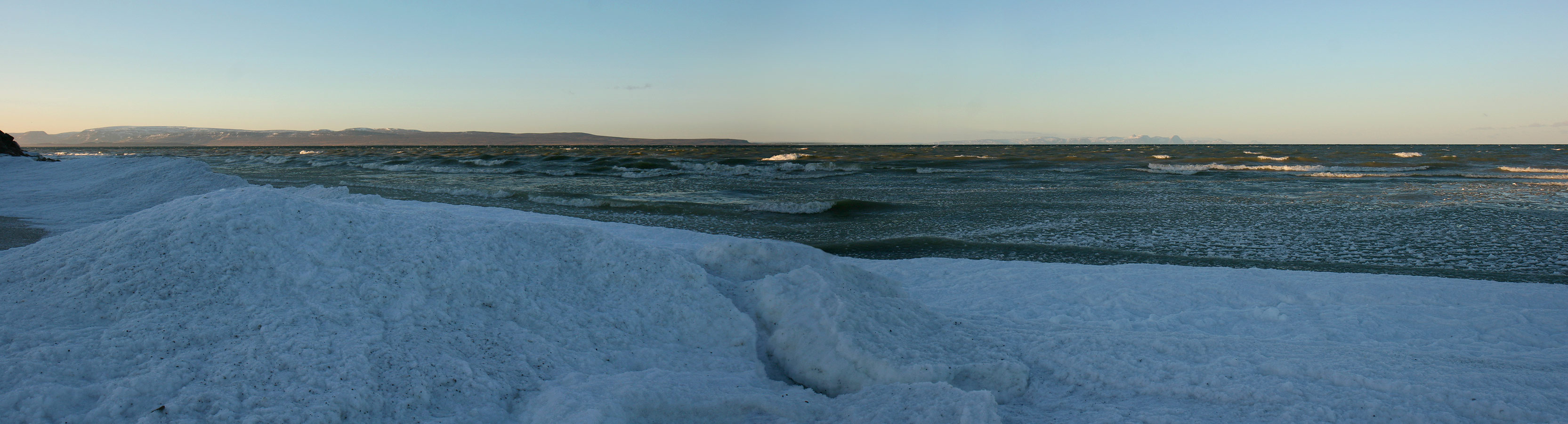
Panorama of river ice on the edge of Húnaflói, cast ashore from Húnaflói on the beach at Blönduós. Vatnsnes peninsula is to the east, and Ballafjöll mountain in the Westfjords appears to the northeast.
