= Skagaströnd =

Municipality and village in the Northwestern Region, Iceland

Skagaströnd Höfðakaupstadur
- Municipality and village
- Sveitarfélagið Skagaströnd
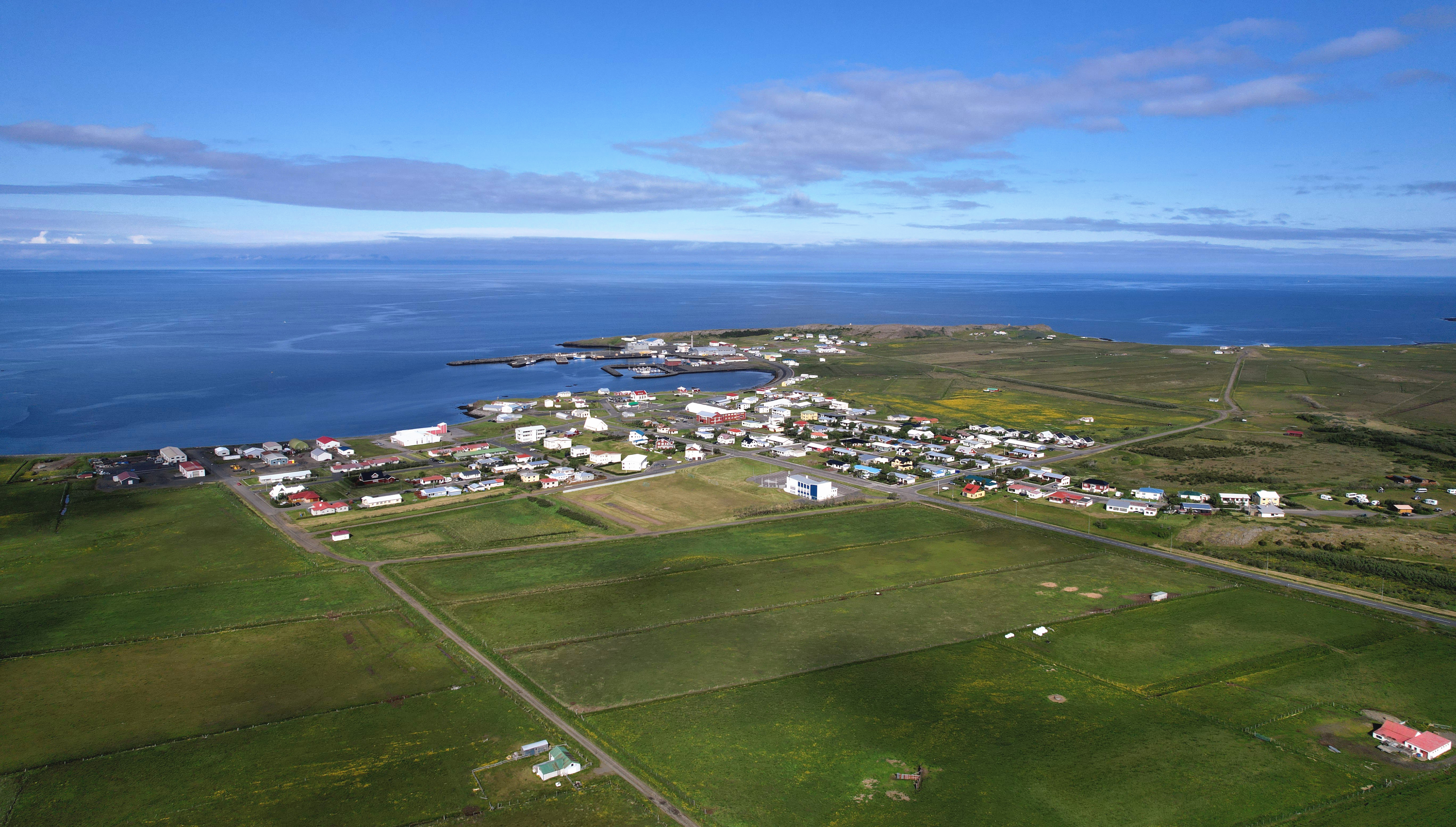

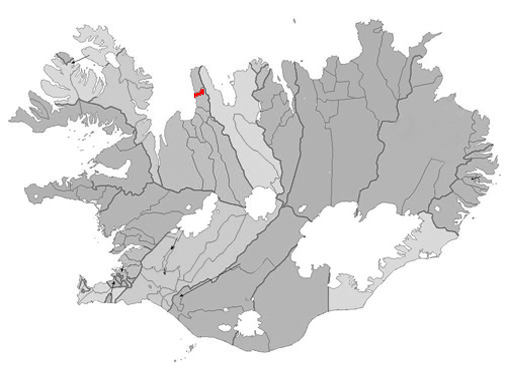
- Location of Sveitarfélagið Skagaströnd

- Location of Skagaströnd
- Coordinates: 65°50′N 20°19′W
- Country: Iceland
- Region: Northwestern Region
- Constituency: Northwest Constituency
- Settled: c. 10th century
- Trade rights: 1602

Government
  - Mayor: Alexandra Jóhannesdóttir (Ind.)

Area
  - Total: 49.4 km^{2} (19.1 sq mi)
- Highest elevation: 640 m (2,100 ft)

Population (1 January 2021)
  - Total: 470
  - Density: 9.5/km^{2} (25/sq mi)
  - Village: 457
- Postal code(s): 545
- Municipal number: 5609
- Website: www.skagastrond.is

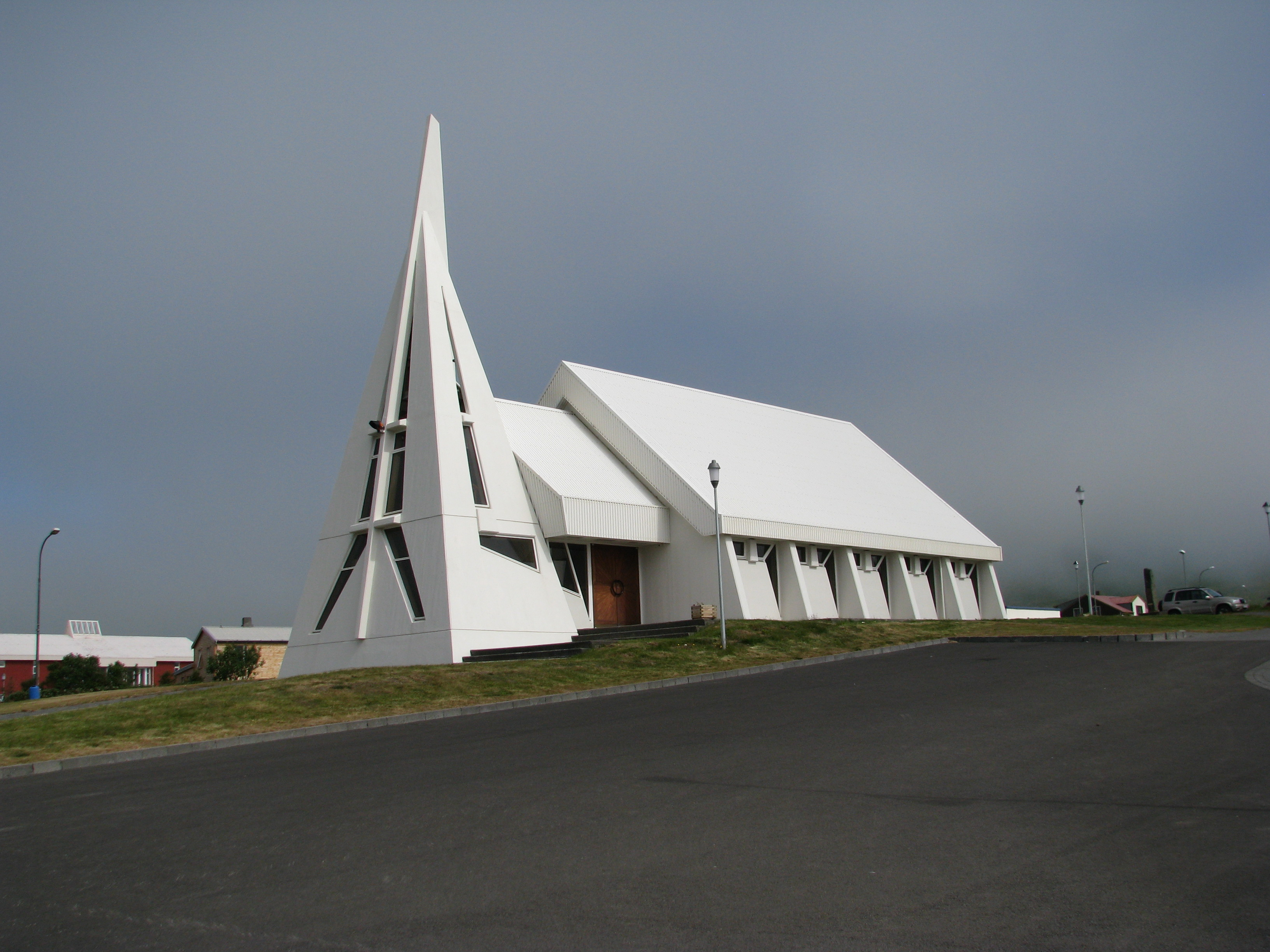
Hólaneskirkja, the village church

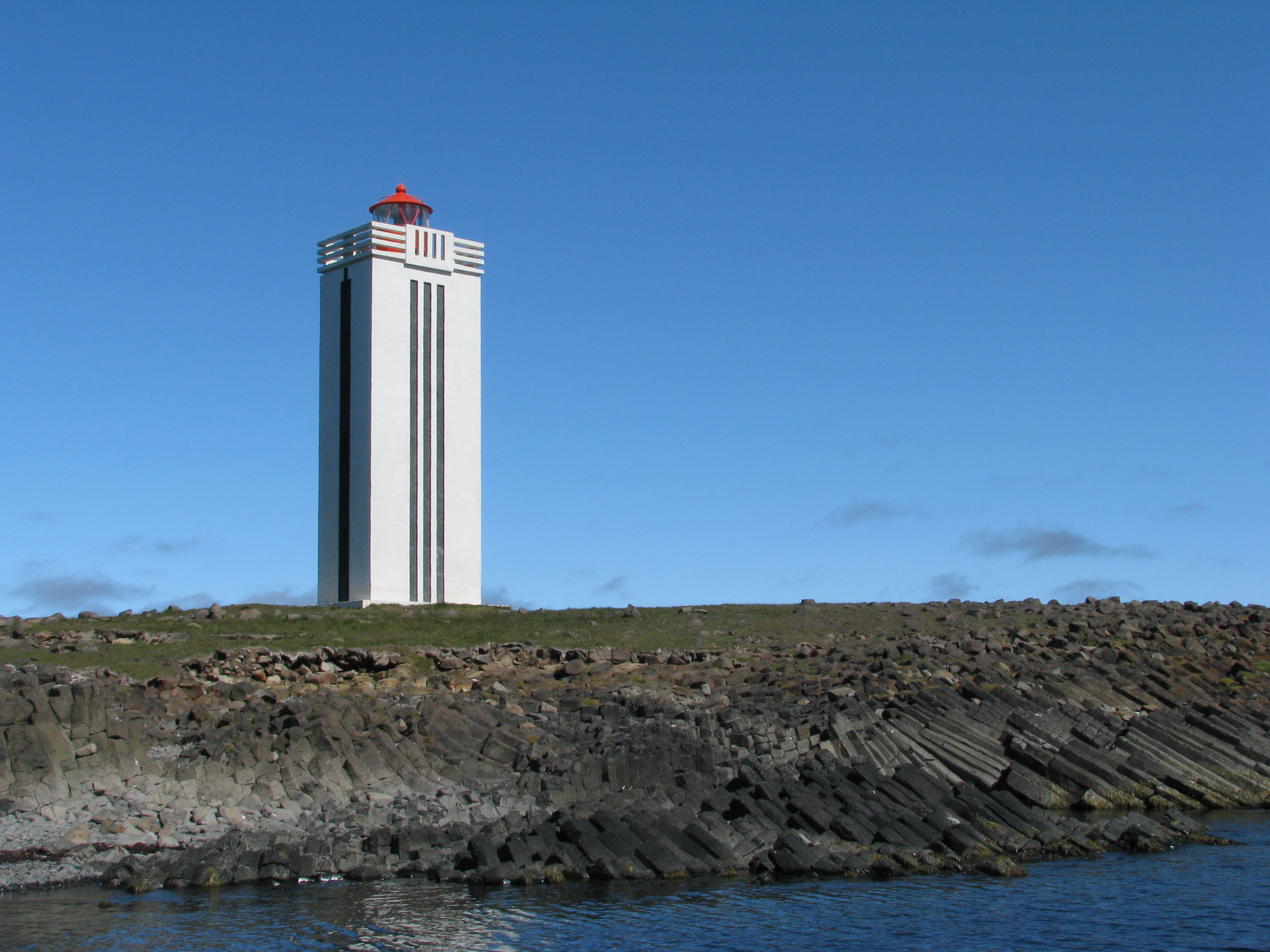
The lighthouse of Kálfshamarsvík

Skagaströnd (Icelandic pronunciation: [ˈskaːɣaˌstrœnt]), previously Höfðakaupstaður (Icelandic: [ˈhœvðaˌkʰœypˌstaːðʏr̥]), is a municipality and village in the Northwestern Region of Iceland. It is situated on the western side of the Skagi peninsula, along the east coast of the Húnaflói ('Húna Bay'). The municipality was officially named Sveitarfélagið Skagaströnd on 1 September 2007. Skagaströnd is the only locality within the municipality.

== Geography ==
The Skagaströnd municipality is bordered to the north and south by the municipality of Húnabyggð and to the east by Sveitarfélagið Skagafjörður. Measuring just 49.4 square kilometres (19.1 mi^{2}), it is the sixth smallest municipality in Iceland by land area.

The only village within the municipality is the now eponymous village of Skagaströnd, which lies at the foot of the Spákonufell ([ˈspauːˌkɔːnʏˌfɛtl̥]; 'Seeress' Mountain'), a culturally significant landmark and the highest point in Skagaströnd, standing 640 metres (2,100 ft) above sea level. On the northwest edge of the village is the Spákonufellshöfði ([-ˌfɛlsˌhœvðɪ]; 'Headland of the Spákonufell'), a 22.5 hectares (0.225 km^{2}; 0.087 mi^{2}) nature preserve and park.

The nearest town is Blönduós, 18 km (11 mi) to the south. Road 74, by which Skagaströnd is connected to Route 1, begins at Blönduós' eastern limit. Skagaströnd is situated 32 km (20 mi) as the crow flies east-northeast of Sauðárkrókur, the regional capital of the Northwestern Region; however, due to the rough terrain the journey between the two settlements by road is more than 50 km (31 mi).

== Name ==
The name Skagaströnd translates to 'Coast of the Skagi' or, literally, 'Coast of the Peninsula,' from the Icelandic skagi [ˈskaijɪ], meaning 'peninsula'—which also serves as the proper name of the peninsula on which the municipality is located—and strönd meaning 'coast, beach, shore.' Skagaströnd originally referred to the entire shoreline extending from the northern tip of the Skagi peninsula to the mouth of the Laxá í Refasveit (also called Laxá-Ytri), a small river that empties into the Húnaflói 8 km (5.0 mi) north of Blönduós. The area historically hosted a number of verstöðvar, traditional fishing outposts and communal mooring places. The northern point of the Skagi is now situated in the northern portion of Skagabyggð and the Laxá í Refasveit forms the boundary between the municipality of Blönduósbær and the southern portion of Skagabyggð. Today, the name Skagaströnd is most often used to refer to the settlement and municipality, however, it is also used by Icelanders to refer to the traditional coastal area.

== Twin towns ==
Skagaströnd is twinned with:

- Lohja, Finland
- Växjö, Sweden
