= Helgafellssveit =

Former municipality in Iceland

Coordinates: 65°02′28″N 22°43′45″W

- Former municipality
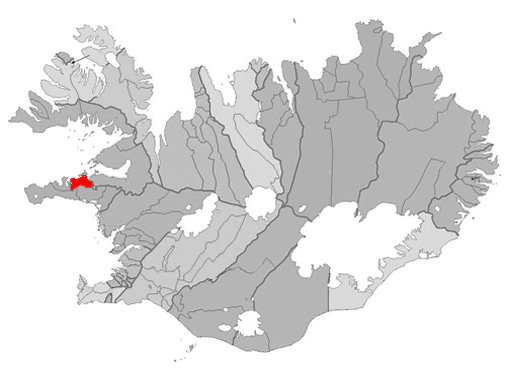
- Location of the municipality

- Location within Iceland
- Country: Iceland
- Region: Western Region
- Constituency: Northwest Constituency
- Municipality: Stykkishólmur

Area
  - Total: 58 km^{2} (22 sq mi)

Population
  - Total: 64
  - Density: 0.91/km^{2} (2.4/sq mi)
- Municipal number: 3710

Helgafellssveit (Icelandic pronunciation: [ˈhɛlkaˌfɛlsˌsveiːt]) was a municipality in Iceland. In March 2022, residents of Helgafellssveit and the neighboring municipality of Stykkishólmur voted to merge the two municipalities into one.
