= Municipalities of Iceland =

Second-level administrative subdivision of Iceland

Municipalities of Iceland Sveitarfélög Íslands (Icelandic)
- Map of municipalities as of 2026
- Category: Municipality
- Location: Iceland
- Found in: Regions
- Number: 61 (as of 2026)
- Populations: Smallest: Árneshreppur (pop. 53); Largest: Reykjavík (pop. 140,000)
- Areas: Smallest: Seltjarnarnes (2.11 km^{2}); Largest: Þingeyjarsveit (12,019.59 km^{2})
- Government: Municipal council

The municipalities of Iceland (Icelandic: sveitarfélög [ˈsveiːtarˌfjɛːˌlœːɣ]; sing. sveitarfélag [ˈsveiːtarˌfjɛːˌlaːɣ]) are local administrative areas in Iceland that provide a number of services to their inhabitants such as kindergartens, elementary schools, waste management, social services, public housing, public transportation, services to senior citizens and disabled people. They also govern zoning and can voluntarily take on additional functions if they have the budget for it. The autonomy of municipalities over their own matters is guaranteed by the Icelandic constitution.

== History ==
The origin of the municipalities can be traced back to the commonwealth period in the 10th century when rural communities were organized into communes (hreppar [r̥ɛhpar̥]) with the main purpose of providing help for the poorest individuals in society. When urbanization began in Iceland during the 18th and 19th centuries, several independent townships (kaupstaðir [ˈkʰœypˌstaːðɪr̥]) were created. The role of municipalities was further formalized during the 20th century and by the end of the century there was no longer any official distinction between urban and rural municipalities.

The trend in recent years has been to transfer more functions and power from the state to the municipalities. This has called for larger municipalities. The government encourages municipalities to merge but has taken a different approach to the issue than governments in other Nordic countries where forced amalgamation is regularly carried out (such as the municipal reform in Denmark that took effect in 2007). Instead, the process is voluntary. Municipalities negotiate possible mergers among themselves, and any merger must first receive approval from the relevant municipality's constituent voting electorate in a referendum. A similar approach is used by the Faroese government. However, municipalities having a population of below 50 may be forced to merge.

The number of municipalities peaked in the mid-20th century. There were 229 of them in 1950. From 1986 to 1998, their number decreased from 222 to 124. From 2000 to 2026, their number decreased from 124 to the current figure of 61.

== Government ==
The municipalities are governed by municipal councils which are directly elected every four years. Municipal elections were last held on 15 May 2026. The sizes of these councils vary from five members in the smallest municipalities to fifteen in the largest one. Most municipalities except for the very small ones hire an executive manager who may or may not be a member of the municipal council. These managers are usually referred to as mayors (bæjarstjóri [ˈpaiːjarˌstjouːrɪ] or borgarstjóri [ˈpɔrkarˌstjouːrɪ]) in the mostly urban municipalities but "municipal manager" (sveitarstjóri [ˈsveiːtarˌstjouːrɪ]) in the rural or mixed municipalities. It is common for these executive managers to be professionally hired and politically independent.

== List of municipalities ==
Vernacular name	Official name	Region	Population (2021 Census)	Area (km^{2})	LAU code	Mayor (Party)
Reykjavík	Reykjavíkurborg	Höfuðborgarsvæðið	129,886	274.19	0000	Heiða Björg Hilmisdóttir (S)
Kópavogur	Kópavogsbær	Höfuðborgarsvæðið	37,366	79.99	1000	Ásdís Kristjánsdóttir (D)
Seltjarnarnes	Seltjarnarnesbær	Höfuðborgarsvæðið	4,567	2.11	1100	Ásgerður Halldórsdóttir (D)
Garðabær		Höfuðborgarsvæðið	17,224	75.46	1300	Gunnar Einarsson (D)
Hafnarfjörður	Hafnarfjarðarkaupstaður	Höfuðborgarsvæðið	29,000	144.07	1400	Haraldur L. Haraldsson (Ind.)
Mosfellsbær		Höfuðborgarsvæðið	12,340	186.16	1604	Haraldur Sverrisson (D)
Kjósarhreppur		Höfuðborgarsvæðið	274	284.08	1606	Guðný Guðrún Ívarsdóttir (Ind.)
Reykjanesbær		Suðurnes	18,847	144.48	2000	Kjartan Már Kjartansson (Ind.)
Grindavíkurbær		Suðurnes	3,445	423.46	2300	Róbert Ragnarsson (Ind.)
Suðurnesjabær		Suðurnes	3,533	82.46	2505	Magnús Stefánsson (Ind.)
Vogar	Sveitarfélagið Vogar	Suðurnes	1,288	164.4	2506	Ásgeir Eiríksson (Ind.)
Akranes	Akraneskaupstaður	Vesturland	7,496	8.57	3000	Regína Ásvaldsdóttir (Ind.)
Hvalfjarðarsveit		Vesturland	637	481.06	3511	Björgvin Helgason (Ind.)
Borgarbyggð		Vesturland	3,713	5142.65	3609	Unnur Brá Konráðsdóttir (D)
Grundarfjarðarbær		Vesturland	842	149.08	3709	Eyþór Garðarsson (Ind.)
Eyja- og Miklaholtshreppur		Vesturland	110	383.51	3713	Eggert Kjartansson (Ind.)
Snæfellsbær		Vesturland	1,622	682.04	3714	Kristinn Jónasson (Ind.)
Stykkishólmur		Vesturland	1,233	253.47	3716	Sturla Böðvarsson (D)
Dalabyggð		Vesturland	633	2426.88	3811	Jóhannes Haukur Hauksson (Ind.)
Bolungarvík	Bolungarvíkurkaupstaður	Vestfirðir	929	108.08	4100	Elías Jónatansson (Ind.)
Ísafjarðarbær		Vestfirðir	3,674	2380.55	4200	Arna Lára Jónsdóttir (Ind.)
Reykhólahreppur		Vestfirðir	245	1096.23	4502	Karl Kristjánsson (Ind.)
Vesturbyggð		Vestfirðir	1,280	1511.43	4607	Rebekka Hilmarsdóttir (D)
Súðavík	Súðavíkurhreppur	Vestfirðir	189	750.35	4803	Pétur G. Markan (Ind.)
Árneshreppur		Vestfirðir	37	705.41	4901	Eva Sigurbjörnsdóttir (Ind.)
Kaldrananeshreppur		Vestfirðir	109	458.4	4902	Finnur Ólafsson (Ind.)
Strandabyggð		Vestfirðir	416	1833.88	4911	Jón Gísli Jónsson (Ind.)
Húnaþing vestra		Norðurland vestra	1,183	3022.83	5508	Guðný Hrund Karlsdóttir (Ind.)
Skagaströnd	Sveitarfélagið Skagaströnd	Norðurland vestra	460	52.6	5609	Magnús B. Jónsson (Ind.)
Húnabyggð		Norðurland vestra	1,377	4487.18	5613	
Skagafjörður		Norðurland vestra	4,204	5542.46	5716	Ásta Björg Pálmadóttir (Ind.)
Akureyri	Akureyrarbær	Norðurland eystra	18,921	135.55	6000	Ásthildur Sturludóttir (Ind.)
Norðurþing		Norðurland eystra	2,945	3732.78	6100	Kristján Þór Magnússon (Ind.)
Fjallabyggð		Norðurland eystra	1,954	363.83	6250	Gunnar Ingi Birgisson (Ind.)
Dalvíkurbyggð		Norðurland eystra	1,816	597.35	6400	Bjarni Þ. Bjarnason (B)
Eyjafjarðarsveit		Norðurland eystra	1,046	1774.83	6513	Karl Frímannsson (Ind.)
Hörgársveit		Norðurland eystra	619	893.97	6515	Snorri Finnlaugsson (Ind.)
Svalbarðsstrandarhreppur		Norðurland eystra	432	54.39	6601	Eiríkur H. Hauksson (Ind.)
Grýtubakkahreppur		Norðurland eystra	371	431.43	6602	Þröstur Friðfinnsson (Ind.)
Tjörneshreppur		Norðurland eystra	53	198.86	6611	Steinþór Heiðarsson (Ind.)
Þingeyjarsveit		Norðurland eystra	1,231	12019.59	6613	Dagbjört Jónsdóttir (Ind.)
Langanesbyggð		Norðurland eystra	588	2483.16	6710	Elías Pétursson (Ind.)
Fjarðabyggð		Austurland	4,955	1614.45	7300	Páll Björgvin Guðmundsson (Ind.)
Múlaþing		Austurland	4,853	10669.19	7400	Björn Ingimarsson (Ind.)
Vopnafjarðarhreppur		Austurland	635	1903.31	7502	Ólafur Áki Ragnarsson (Ind.)
Fljótsdalshreppur		Austurland	90	1516.3	7505	Gunnþórunn Ingólfsdóttir (Ind.)
Hornafjörður	Sveitarfélagið Hornafjörður	Suðurland	2,297	6309.44	7708	Björn Ingi Jónsson (D)
Vestmannaeyjar	Vestmannaeyjabær	Suðurland	4,194	16.14	8000	Elliði Vignisson (D)
Árborg	Sveitarfélagið Árborg	Suðurland	10,258	157.19	8200	Ásta Stefánsdóttir (D)
Mýrdalshreppur		Suðurland	729	749.09	8508	Ásgeir Magnússon (Ind.)
Skaftárhreppur		Suðurland	560	6944.26	8509	Eygló Kristjánsdóttir (Ind.)
Ásahreppur		Suðurland	222	2942.32	8610	Egill Sigurðsson (Ind.)
Rangárþing eystra		Suðurland	1,828	1839.93	8613	Ísólfur Gylfi Pálmason (B)
Rangárþing ytra		Suðurland	1,698	3187.09	8614	Ágúst Sigurðsson (D)
Hrunamannahreppur		Suðurland	781	1375.07	8710	Jón G. Valgeirsson (Ind.)
Hveragerði	Hveragerðisbær	Suðurland	2,723	9.03	8716	Aldís Hafsteinsdóttir (D)
Ölfus	Sveitarfélagið Ölfus	Suðurland	2,277	736.32	8717	Gunnsteinn R. Ómarsson (Ind.)
Grímsnes- og Grafningshreppur		Suðurland	569	899.44	8719	Ingibjörg Harðardóttir (Ind.)
Skeiða- og Gnúpverjahreppur		Suðurland	533	2231.74	8720	Kristófer Tómasson (Ind.)
Bláskógabyggð		Suðurland	1,124	3300	8721	Valtýr Valtýsson (Ind.)
Flóahreppur		Suðurland	661	288.9	8722	Eydís Þ. Indriðadóttir (Ind.)

== Municipal chronological timeline ==
From 1953 to 2026, the number of municipalities in Iceland decreased from 229 to 61:

- 16 May 2026 (reduced to 61)
  - Skorradalshreppur merged with Borgarbyggð.
- 1 August 2024 (reduced to 62)
  - Skagabyggð merged with Húnabyggð.
- 19 May 2024 (reduced to 63)
  - Tálknafjarðarhreppur merged with Vesturbyggð.
- 14 May 2022 (reduced to 64)
  - Skútustaðahreppur merged with Þingeyjarsveit.
  - Stykkishólmsbær and Helgafellssveit merged to form Stykkishólmur.
  - Svalbarðshreppur merged with Langanesbyggð.
  - Akrahreppur merged with Skagafjörður.
  - Blönduósbær and Húnavatnshreppur merged to form Húnabyggð
- 17 February 2020 (reduced to 69)
  - Borgarfjarðarhreppur, Djúpavogshreppur, Fljótsdalshérað, and Seyðisfjarðarkaupstaður merged to form Múlaþing.
- 24 January 2019
  - Akureyrarkaupstaður renamed into Akureyrarbær.
- 7 January 2019
  - Sandgerði/Garður renamed into Suðurnesjabær.
- 26 May 2018 (reduced to 72)
  - Breiðdalshreppur merged with Fjarðabyggð.
  - Sandgerði and Garður merged to form Sandgerði/Garður.
- 13 August 2013
  - Seltjarnarneskaupstaður renamed into Seltjarnarnesbær.
- 1 January 2013 (reduced to 74)
  - Álftanes merged with Garðabær.
- 1 January 2012 (reduced to 75)
  - Bæjarhreppur merged with Húnaþing vestra
- 11 June 2010 (reduced to 76)
  - Arnarneshreppur merged with Hörgárbyggð.
- 1 June 2009 (reduced to 77)
  - Grímseyjarhreppur merged with Akureyrarkaupstaður.
- 15 July 2008 (reduced to 78)
  - Aðaldælahreppur merged with Þingeyjarsveit.
- 12 September 2007
  - Höfðahreppur renamed into Skagaströnd.
- 8 April 2006 (reduced to 79)
  - Þórshafnarhreppur and Skeggjastaðahreppur merged to form Langanesbyggð.
- 11 March 2006 (reduced to 80)
  - Áshreppur merged with Húnavatnshreppur.
  - Hólmavíkurhreppur and Broddaneshreppur merged to form Strandabyggð.
- 20 February 2006 (reduced to 82)
  - Saurbæjarhreppur merged with Dalabyggð.
- 11 February 2006 (reduced to 83)
  - Gaulverjabæjarhreppur, Hraungerðishreppur, and Villingaholtshreppur merged to form Flóahreppur.
- 28 January 2006 (reduced to 85)
  - Ólafsfjarðarbær and Siglufjarðarkaupstaður merged to form Fjallabyggð.
- 21 January 2006 (reduced to 86)
  - Húsavíkurbær, Kelduneshreppur, Öxarfjarðarhreppur, and Raufarhafnarhreppur merged to form Norðurþing.
- 10 January 2006
  - Vatnsleysustrandarhreppur renamed into Vogar.
- 8 October 2005 (reduced to 89)
  - Mjóafjarðarhreppur, Fáskrúðsfjarðarhreppur, and Austurbyggð merged with Fjarðabyggð.
- 23 April 2005 (reduced to 92)
  - Borgarfjarðarsveit, Hvítársíðuhreppur, and Kolbeinsstaðahreppur merged with Borgarbyggð.
- 20 November 2004 (reduced to 95)
  - Bólstaðarhlíðarhreppur, Sveinsstaðarhreppur, Svínavatnshreppur, and Torfalækjarhreppur merged to form Húnavatnshreppur.
  - Hvalfjarðarstrandarhreppur, Innri-Akraneshreppur, Leirár- og Melahreppur, and Skilmannahreppur merged to form Hvalfjarðarsveit.
- 1 November 2004 (reduced to 101)
  - Austur-Hérað, Fellahreppur, and Norður-Hérað merged to form Fljótsdalshérað.
- 1 August 2004 (reduced to 103)
  - Hríseyjarhreppur merged with Akureyrarkaupstaður.
- 17 June 2004
  - Bessastaðahreppur renamed into Álftanes.
- 28 January 2004
  - Gerðahreppur renamed into Garður.
- 10 May 2003 (reduced to 104)
  - Stöðvarhreppur and Búðahreppur merged to form Austurbyggð.
- 9 June 2002 (reduced to 105)
  - Kirkjubólshreppur merged with Hólmavíkurhreppur.
- 16 March 2002 (reduced to 106)
  - Holta- og Landsveit, Djúpárhreppur, and Rangárvallahreppur merged to form Rangárþing ytra.
- 12 March 2002 (reduced to 108)
  - Húsavíkurkaupstaður and Reykjahreppur merged to form Húsavíkurbær.
- 11 February 2002 (reduced to 109)
  - Þingvallahreppur, Laugardalshreppur, and Biskupstungnahreppur merged to form Bláskógabyggð.
- 21 January 2002 (reduced to 111)
  - Gnúpverjahreppur and Skeiðahreppur merged to form Skeiða- og Gnúpverjahreppur
- 31 December 2001 (reduced to 112)
  - Vindhælishreppur merged with Skagabyggð.
- 20 November 2001 (reduced to 113)
  - Austur-Eyjafjallahreppur, Vestur-Eyjafjallahreppur, Austur-Landeyjahreppur, Vestur-Landeyjahreppur, Fljótshlíðarhreppur, and Hvolhreppur merged to form Rangárþing eystra.
- 15 November 2001 (reduced to 118)
  - Hálshreppur, Ljósavatnshreppur, Bárðdælahreppur, and Reykdælahreppur merged to form Þingeyjarsveit.
- 26 April 2001 (reduced to 121)
  - Engihlíðarhreppur merged with Blönduósbær.
- 1 January 2001 (reduced to 122)
  - Skriðuhreppur, Öxnadalshreppur, and Glæsibæjarhreppur merged to form Hörgárbyggð.
- 7 June 1998 (reduced to 124)
  - Kjalarneshreppur merged with Reykjavíkurborg.
  - Skriðdalshreppur, Vallahreppur, Egilsstaðabær, Eiðahreppur, and Hjaltastaðarhreppur merged to form Austur-Hérað.
  - Dalvíkurkaupstaður, Svarfaðardalshreppur, and Árskógshreppur merged to form Dalvíkurbyggð.
  - Neskaupstaður, Eskifjarðarkaupstaður and Reyðarfjarðarhreppur merged to form Fjarðabyggð.
  - Staðarhreppur, Fremri Torfustaðahreppur, Ytri Torfustaðahreppur, Hvammstangahreppur, Kirkjuhvammshreppur, Þverárhreppur, and Þorkelshólshreppur merged to form Húnaþing vestra.
  - Selfosskaupstaður, Stokkseyrarhreppur, Eyrarbakkahreppur, and Sandvíkurhreppur merged to form Árborg.
  - Lundarreykjardalshreppur, Reykholtsdalshreppur, Hálsahreppur, and Andakílshreppur merged to form Borgarfjarðarsveit.
- 6 June 1998 (reduced to 145)
  - Sauðárkrókskaupstaður, Skefilsstaðahreppur, Skarðshreppur, Staðarhreppur, Seyluhreppur, Lýtingsstaðahreppur, Rípurhreppur, Viðvíkurhreppur, Hólahreppur, Hofshreppur, and Fljótahreppur merged to form Skagafjörður.
  - Bæjarhreppur, Borgarhafnarhreppur, Hofshreppur, and Hornafjarðarbær merged to form Hornafjörður.
- 1 June 1998 (reduced to 155)
  - Grímsneshreppur and Grafningshreppur merged to form Grímsnes- og Grafningshreppur.
- 14 February 1998 (reduced to 158)
  - Þverárhlíðarhreppur, Borgarhreppur, and Álftaneshreppur merged with Borgarbyggð.
- 1 January 1998 (reduced to 161)
  - Skógarstrandarhreppur merged with Dalabyggð.
- 27 December 1997 (reduced to 163)
  - Hlíðarhreppur, Jökuldalshreppur, and Tunguhreppur merged to form Norður-Hérað.
- 1 June 1996 (reduced to 165)
  - Ísafjarðarkaupstaður, Þingeyrarhreppur, Mýrahreppur, Mosvallahreppur, Flateyrarhreppur, and Suðureyrarhreppur merged to form Ísafjarðarbær.
- 19 April 1995 (increased to 170)
  - Helgafellssveit split from Stykkishólmur.
- 1 January 1995 (reduced to 169)
  - Ögurhreppur and Reykjarfjarðarhreppur merged with Súðavíkurhreppur.
- 12 June 1994 (reduced to 171)
  - Höfn, Nesjahreppur, and Mýrahreppur merged to form Hornafjarðarbær.
- 11 June 1994 (reduced to 173)
  - Suðurdalahreppur, Haukadalshreppur, Laxárdalshreppur, Hvammshreppur, Fellsstrandarhreppur, and Skarðshreppur merged to form Dalabyggð.
  - Staðarsveit, Breiðuvíkurhreppur, Neshreppur utan Ennis, and Ólafsvíkurbær merged to form Snæfellsbær.
  - Hafnahreppur, Keflavíkurbær, and Njarðvíkurbær merged to form Reykjanesbær.
  - Norðfjarðarhreppur merged with Neskaupstaður.
  - Barðastrandarhreppur, Rauðasandshreppur, Patrekshreppur, and Bíldudalshreppur merged to form Vesturbyggð.
  - Sauðaneshreppur merged with Þórshafnarhreppur.
  - Norðurárdalshreppur, Stafholtstungnahreppur, Borgarnesbær, and Hraunhreppur merged to form Borgarbyggð.
  - Eyjarhreppur and Miklaholtshreppur merged to form Eyja- og Miklaholtshreppur.
  - Nauteyrarhreppur í Norður-Ísafjarðarsýslu and Hólmavíkurhreppur í Strandasýslu merged to form Hólmavíkurhreppur.
  - Snæfjallahreppur í Norður-Ísafjarðarsýslu merged with Ísafjarðarkaupstaður.
  - Helgafellssveit merged with Stykkishólmur.
- 1 January 1994 (reduced to 195)
  - Fjallahreppur merged with Öxarfjarðarhreppur.
- 1 July 1993 (reduced to 196)
  - Landmannahreppur and Holtahreppur merged to form Holta- og Landsveit.
- 1 October 1992 (reduced to 197)
  - Beruneshreppur, Búlandshreppur, and Geithellnahreppur merged to form Djúpavogshreppur.
- 1 January 1992 (reduced to 199)
  - Hörðudalshreppur merged with Miðdalahreppur to form Suðurdalahreppur.
  - Fellshreppur í Strandasýslu merged with Óspakseyrarhreppur to form Broddaneshreppur.
- 17 February 1991 (reduced to 201)
  - Presthólahreppur merged with Öxarfjarðarhreppur.
- 1 January 1991 (reduced to 202)
  - Hrafnagilshreppur, Saurbæjarhreppur, and Öngulsstaðahreppur merged to form Eyjafjarðarsveit.
- 10 June 1990 (reduced to 204)
  - Hofsóshreppur and Fellshreppur merged with Hofshreppur.
  - Hörglandshreppur, Kirkjubæjarhreppur, Skaftártunguhreppur, Leiðvallahreppur, and Álftavershreppur merged to form Skaftárhreppur.
- 1 April 1990 (reduced to 210)
  - Fróðárhreppur merged with Ólafsvíkurkaupstaður.
  - Auðkúluhreppur merged with Þingeyrarhreppur.
  - Seyðisfjarðarhreppur merged with Seyðisfjarðarkaupstaður.
- 1 January 1989 (reduced to 213)
  - Selvogshreppur merged with Ölfushreppur.
- 1 April 1988 (reduced to 214)
  - Haganeshreppur merged with Holtshreppur to form Fljótahreppur.
- 1 January 1988 (reduced to 215)
  - Helgustaðahreppur merged with Eskifjarðarkaupstaður.
- 4 July 1987 (reduced to 216)
  - Geiradalshreppur, Gufudalshreppur, Múlahreppur, and Flateyjarhreppur merged with Reykhólahreppur.
- 1 July 1987 (reduced to 220)
  - Ketildalahreppur merged with Suðurfjarðarhreppur to form Bíldudalshreppur.
- 1 January 1987 (reduced to 221)
  - Hrófbergshreppur merged with Hólmavíkurhreppur.
- 30 July 1986 (reduced to 222)
  - Klofningshreppur merged with Fellsstrandarhreppur.
- 1984 (reduced to 223)
  - Dyrhólahreppur merged with Hvammshreppur to form Mýrdalshreppur.
- 1972 (reduced to 224)
  - Flateyjarhreppur merged with Hálshreppur.
  - Loðmundarfjarðarhreppur merged with Borgarfjarðarhreppur.
- 1971 (reduced to 226)
  - Eyrarhreppur merged with Ísafjarðarkaupstaður.
- 1 January 1964 (reduced to 227)
  - Grunnavíkurhreppur merged with Snæfjallahreppur.
- 1953 (229 municipalities reduced to 228)
  - Sléttuhreppur is deserted and included in Ísafjarðarkaupstaður, but not officially merged until 1995.

== See also ==
- List of cities and towns in Iceland
- Constituencies of Iceland
- List of the most populated municipalities in the Nordic countries
