= Counties of Iceland =

Historical country divisions

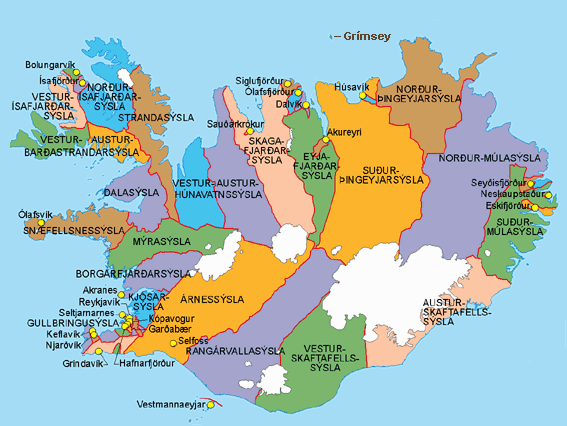
Traditional counties and towns of Iceland

Iceland was historically divided into 23 counties known as sýslur (Icelandic pronunciation: [ˈsistlʏr̥]), and 23 independent towns known as kaupstaðir ([ˈkʰœypˌstaːðɪr̥]). Iceland is now split up between 24 sýslumenn (magistrates) that are the highest authority over the local police (except in Reykjavík where there is a special office of police commissioner) and carry out administrative functions such as declaring bankruptcy and marrying people outside of the church. The jurisdictions of these magistrates often follow the lines of the historical counties, but not always. When speaking of these new "administrative" counties, the custom is to associate them with the county seats rather than using the names of the traditional counties, even when they cover the same area.

== Composition ==
Independent towns (kaupstaðir) were first created in the 18th century as urbanisation began in Iceland; this practice continued into the 1980s. The last town that was declared an independent town was Ólafsvík in 1983. Since then, the laws regarding municipalities have been changed in such a way that there is no longer any distinction made between urban or rural municipalities.

=== Historical counties ===
The historical counties were:

- Árnessýsla ([ˈaurˌnɛsˌsistla], lit. 'Árnes County')
- Austur-Barðastrandarsýsla ([ˈœystʏr-ˈparðaˌstrantarˌsistla], lit. 'East Barðaströnd County')
- Austur-Húnavatnssýsla ([ˈœystʏr ˈhuːnaˌvasːˌsistla], lit. 'East Húnavatn County')
- Austur-Skaftafellssýsla ([ˈœystʏr ˈskaftaˌfɛlsˌsistla], lit. 'East Skaftafell County')
- Borgarfjarðarsýsla ([ˈpɔrkarˌfjarðarˌsistla], lit. 'Borgarfjörður County')
- Dalasýsla ([ˈtaːlaˌsistla], lit. 'Valley County')
- Eyjafjarðarsýsla ([ˈeiːjaˌfjarðarˌsistla], lit. 'Eyjafjörður County')
- Gullbringusýsla ([ˈkʏtl̥ˌpriŋkʏˌsistla], lit. 'Gullbringa County')
- Kjósarsýsla ([ˈcʰouːsarˌsistla], lit. 'Kjós County')
- Mýrasýsla ([ˈmiːraˌsistla], lit. 'Mýrar County')
- Norður-Ísafjarðarsýsla ([ˈnɔrðʏr ˈiːsaˌfjarðarˌsistla], lit. 'North Ísafjörður County')
- Norður-Múlasýsla ([ˈnɔrðʏr ˈmuːlaˌsistla], lit. 'North Múli County')
- Norður-Þingeyjarsýsla ([ˈnɔrðʏr ˈθiŋkˌeiːjarˌsistla], lit. 'North Þingey County')
- Rangárvallasýsla ([ˈrauŋkˌaurˌvatlaˌsistla], lit. 'Rangárvellir County')
- Skagafjarðarsýsla ([ˈskaːɣaˌfjarðarˌsistla], lit. 'Skagafjörður County')
- Snæfellsnes- og Hnappadalssýsla ([ˈstnaiːˌfɛlsˌnɛːs ɔɣ ˈn̥ahpaˌtalsˌsistla], lit. 'Snæfellsnes and Hnappadalur County')
- Strandasýsla ([ˈstrantaˌsistla], lit. 'Coast County')
- Suður-Múlasýsla ([ˈsʏːðʏr ˈmuːlaˌsistla], lit. 'South Múli County')
- Suður-Þingeyjarsýsla ([ˈsʏːðʏr ˈθiŋkˌeiːjarˌsistla], lit. 'South Þingey County')
- Vestur-Barðastrandarsýsla ([ˈvɛstʏr ˈparðaˌstrantarˌsistla], lit. 'West Barðaströnd County')
- Vestur-Húnavatnssýsla ([ˈvɛstʏr ˈhuːnaˌvasːˌsistla], lit. 'West Húnavatn County')
- Vestur-Ísafjarðarsýsla ([ˈvɛstʏr ˈiːsaˌfjarðarˌsistla], lit. 'West Ísafjörður County')
- Vestur-Skaftafellssýsla ([ˈvɛstʏr ˈskaftaˌfɛlsˌsistla], lit. 'West Skaftafell County')

=== Independent towns ===
The 23 independent towns were:

- Akranes
- Akureyri (with Grímsey)
- Bolungarvík
- Dalvík
- Eskifjörður
- Garðabær
- Grindavík
- Grundarfjörður (in the past)
- Hafnarfjörður
- Húsavík
- Ísafjörður
- Keflavík
- Kópavogur
- Neskaupstaður
- Njarðvík
- Ólafsfjörður
- Ólafsvík
- Reykjavík
- Sauðárkrókur
- Selfoss
- Seltjarnarnes
- Seyðisfjörður
- Siglufjörður
- Vestmannaeyjar

== See also ==
- Farthings of Iceland
- Regions of Iceland
- Municipalities of Iceland
- Constituencies of Iceland
