= Vogar (municipality) =

Sveitarfélagið Vogar
- Municipality
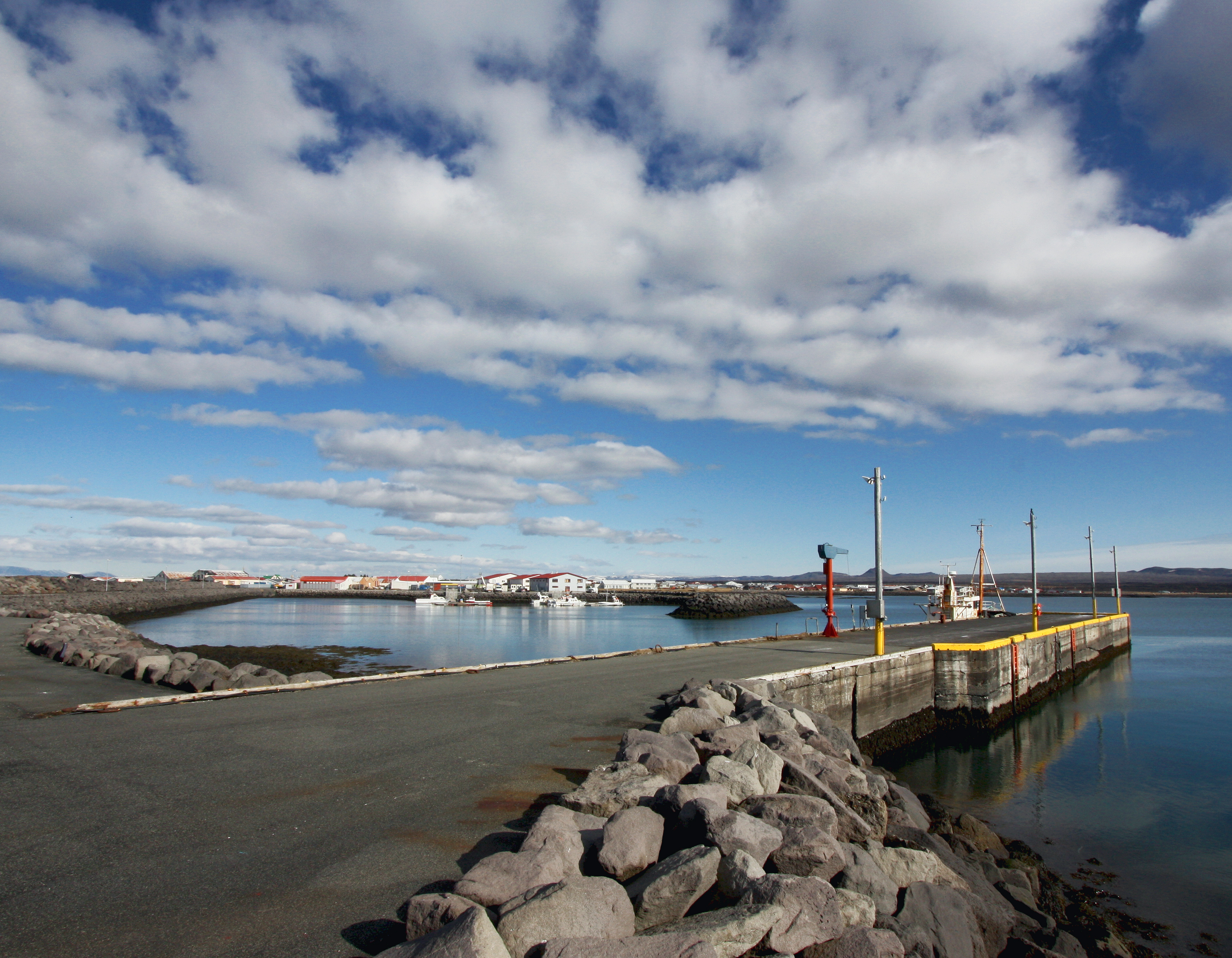
- Skyline of Sveitarfélagið Vogar

- Location within Iceland
- Coordinates: 63°58′0″N 22°23′3″W
- Country: Iceland
- Region: Southern Peninsula
- Constituency: South Constituency

Government
  - Mayor: Ásgeir Eiríksson

Area
  - Total: 165 km^{2} (64 sq mi)

Population
  - Total: 1,161
  - Density: 6.83/km^{2} (17.7/sq mi)
- Postal code(s): 190
- Municipal number: 2506
- Website: vogar.is

Vogar (Icelandic pronunciation: [ˈvɔːɣar̥]) is a municipality located on the Reykjanes Peninsula in western Iceland, between Reykjavík and Keflavík. Its centre and seat is in the town of Vogar. The town features low-lying terrain and the economy is centered on food production, gas extraction, aquaculture, and tourism services. Covering approximately 165 km^{2} (64 sq mi), it had around 1,500 residents in 2024. The small community has a tight-knit coastal culture, with recreational facilities and local events emphasizing marine heritage.

== Geography ==
Vogar lies on Iceland’s Reykjanes Peninsula in western Iceland. Covering approximately 165 km^{2} (64 sq mi), it lies on the southern coast, about 11 km (6.8 mi) from Keflavík International Airport and 29 km (18 mi) southwest of Reykjavík.

The topography is predominantly flat, with mean elevation around 5 m (16 ft) above sea level, set against the backdrop of low coastal plains. Terrain includes coastal shoreline, ponds (e.g., Vógatjörn) and boggy wetlands, reflecting typical coastal and subarctic landscapes.

== Demographics ==
As of 2024, Vogar municipality had approximately 1,500 inhabitants, with about 1,388 residing in the urban town area. The population included 805 males and 695 females and 321 people under the age of 18.

== Economy ==
The economy is centered on food production, with many residents commuting to jobs in nearby towns. An automated gas extraction plant and aquaculture are other economic drivers. Tourism and hospitality services include a hotel, camping site, swimming pool, golf course, and gas station. Vogar maintains a close-knit community ethos, with marine tourism focused on bird-watching, shoreline ecology, and ecological activities.

== Transportation ==
Vogar is accessible via Route 425 and has well-maintained local roads, integrated into Iceland's national road network. It lies close to Keflavík International Airport, while Reykjavík Airport caters to domestic routes. There is a high car ownership and there are no railways. Digital connectivity is strong, supported by Iceland’s high speed internet broadband network.
