= Vilko =

Icelandic food company

- Type: Private
- Founded: 1949 (foundation); 1969 (Vilko soup brand)
- Founder: Lárus Ingimarsson (company); Jón Ingimarsson (Vilko soup brand)
- Headquarters: Blönduós, Iceland
- Area served: Iceland
- Products: Soups, baking products
- Website: vilko.is

Vilko is an Icelandic manufacturer of soups and baking products, headquartered in Blönduós, Iceland.

Vilko's factory in Blönduós was destroyed in a fire in October, 2004, but operations were subsequently restored in a new building, and production resumed in November 2004.

Vilko's soup production was started in Kópavogur, Iceland in 1969 by Jón Ingimarsson. The company later diversified into baking products. Before starting the Vilko soup brand, Vilko was a chemical manufacturer.

== Products (incomplete) ==
=== Soups ===
- Vilko kakósúpa (English: Vilko Hot Chocolate Soup)
- Vilko sætsúpa (English: Vilko Sweet Soup)
- Vilko ávaxtagrautur (English: Vilko Fruit Dessert)
- Vilko bláberjasúpa (English: Vilko Blueberry Soup)
- Vilko apríkósusúpa (English: Vilko Apricot Soup))

=== Baking products ===
- Vilko sjónvarpskaka (English: Vilko TV Cake)
- Vilko skúffukaka (English: Vilko Chocolate Cake)
- Vilko vöfflumix (English: Vilko Waffle Mix)
- Vilko pönnukökumix (English: Vilko Pan Cake Mix)
