= Grýtubakkahreppur =

- Municipality
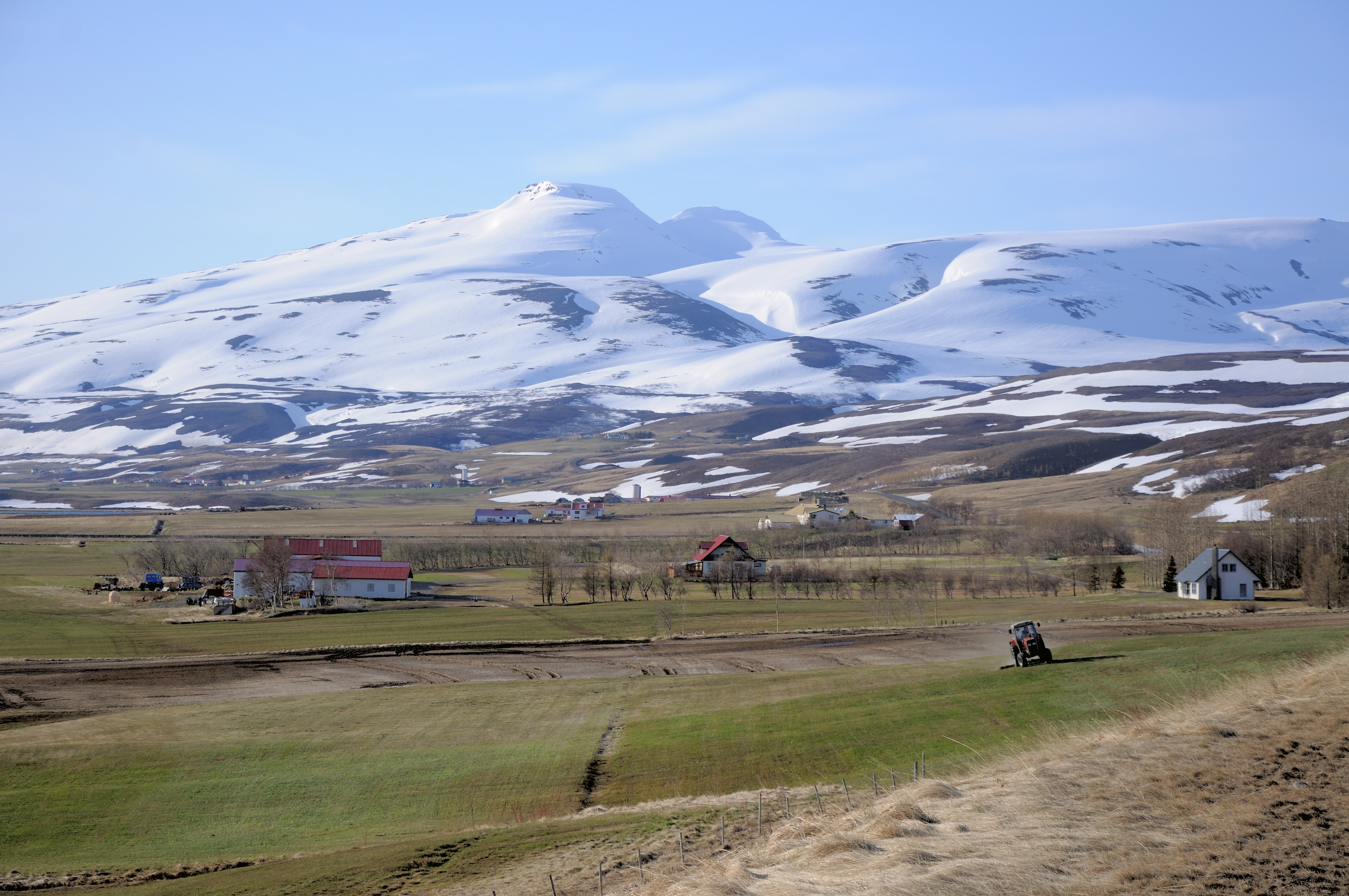
- Skyline of Grýtubakkahreppur

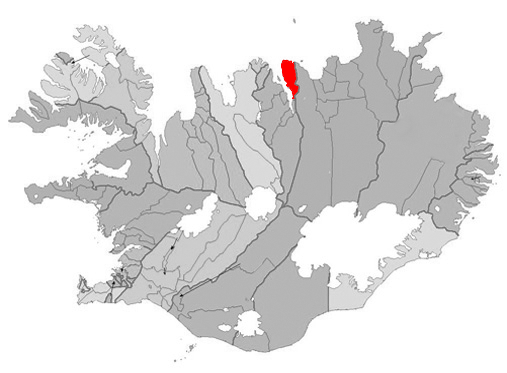
- Location of Grýtubakkahreppur

- Location within Iceland
- Coordinates: 65.9488876°N 18.1988985°W
- Country: Iceland
- Region: Northeastern Region
- Constituency: Northeast Constituency

Government
  - Manager: Þröstur Friðfinnsson

Area
  - Total: 432 km^{2} (167 sq mi)

Population
  - Total: 353
  - Density: 0.82/km^{2} (2.1/sq mi)
- Postal code(s): 6602
- Municipal number: 610
- Website: grenivik.is

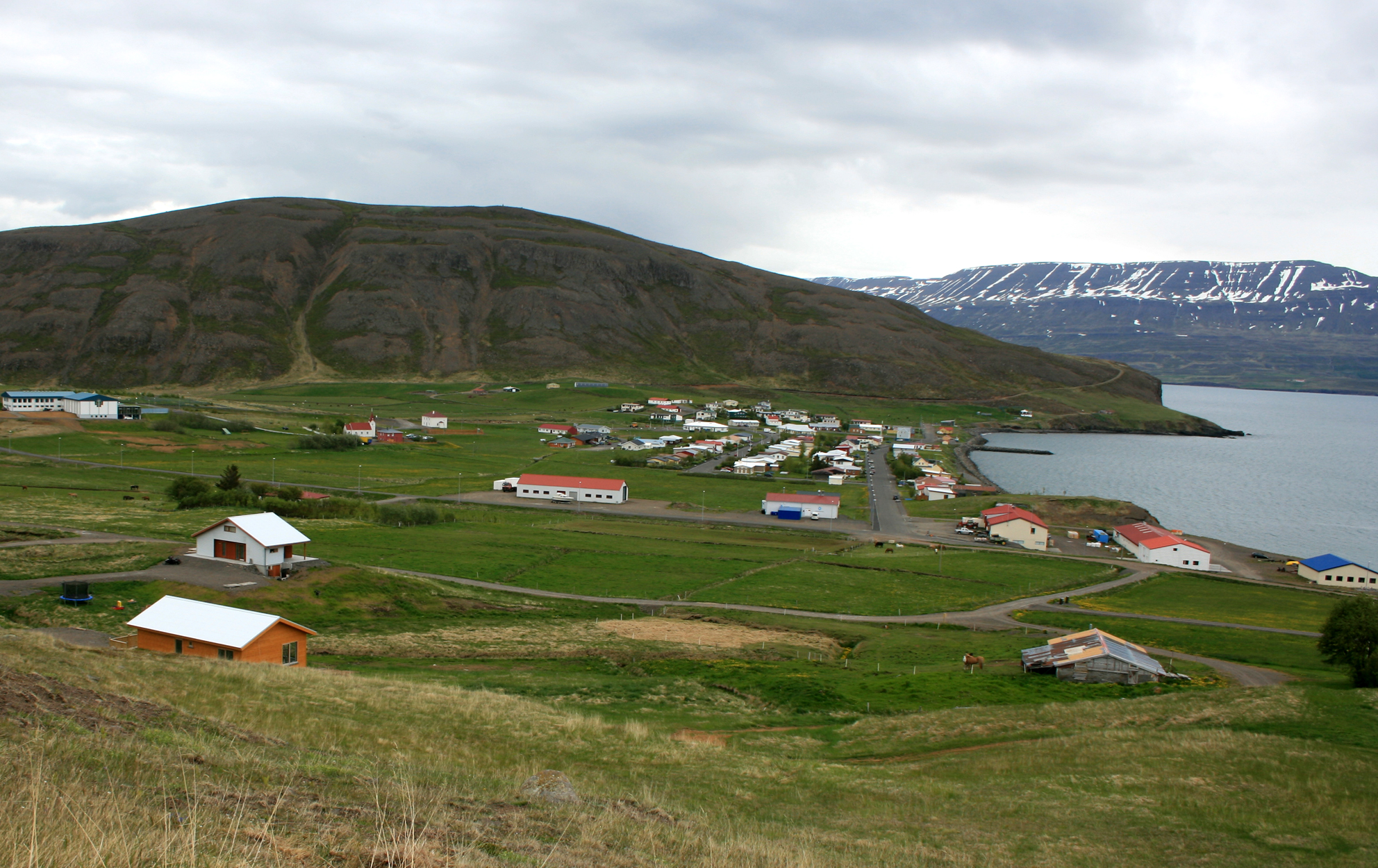
Grenivík

Grýtubakkahreppur (Icelandic pronunciation: [ˈkriːtʏˌpahkaˌr̥ɛhpʏr̥], regionally also [ˈkriːtʰʏ-]) is a municipality located in northern-central Iceland, in Northeastern Region.

The population is approximately 400. It has a local convenience store, a bank, a preschool and a grade school.

== Geography ==
Located on the eastern side of Eyjafjörður, north of Akureyri, next to Dalvík and not too far from Húsavík. Its main settlement is the village Grenivík [ˈkrɛːnɪˌviːk], which is located next to Kaldbakur mountain.

== Sports ==
Local football club Magni Grenivík plays in the third tier of the Iceland football pyramid and play their home games at the Grenivíkurvöllur.
