= Þingeyjarsveit =

Coordinates: 65.723°N 17.359°W

- Municipality
- Location of Þingeyjarsveit

- Location within Iceland
- Country: Iceland
- Region: Northeastern Region
- Constituency: Northeast Constituency

Area
  - Total: 12,021 km^{2} (4,641 sq mi)

Population (2023)
  - Total: 1,393
  - Density: 0.11/km^{2} (0.28/sq mi)
- Postal code(s): 601, 641, 645, 650, 660
- Municipal number: 6613
- Website: thingeyjarsveit.is

Þingeyjarsveit (Icelandic pronunciation: [ˈθiŋkˌeiːjarˌsveiːt]) is a municipality located in Iceland. The Vaglaskógur birch wood, one of Iceland's largest woods, is located in the municipality. The district school and sports centre can be found in Laugar. In 2022 the municipality merged with Skútustaðahreppur under its own name, making the municipality the largest in Iceland by area. The municipality agreed to change their governance from a mayor to a council.
