= Bláskógabyggð =

- Municipality
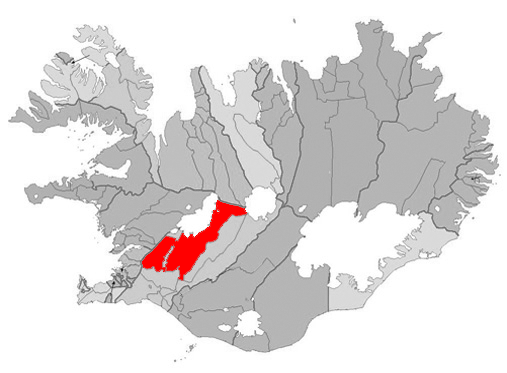
- Location of Bláskógabyggð

- Location within Iceland
- Coordinates: 64.2764°N 20.4009°W
- Country: Iceland
- Region: Southern Region
- Constituency: South Constituency
- Established: 9 June 2002

Government
  - Manager: Valtýr Valtýsson

Area
  - Total: 3,300 km^{2} (1,300 sq mi)

Population
  - Total: 931
  - Density: 0.28/km^{2} (0.73/sq mi)
- Postal code(s): 840
- Municipal number: 8721
- Website: blaskogabyggd.is

Bláskógabyggð ( [ˈplauːˌskouː(ɣ)aˌpɪɣθ]) is a municipality located in Iceland's Southern Region. Its major settlements are Laugarás [ˈlœyːɣarˌauːs] and Laugarvatn. The municipality was formed in 2002 after the merger of Laugardalshreppur, Biskupstungnahreppur and Þingvallahreppur. Within the area of the municipality lies an enclave of another municipality, Grímsnes- og Grafningshreppur.

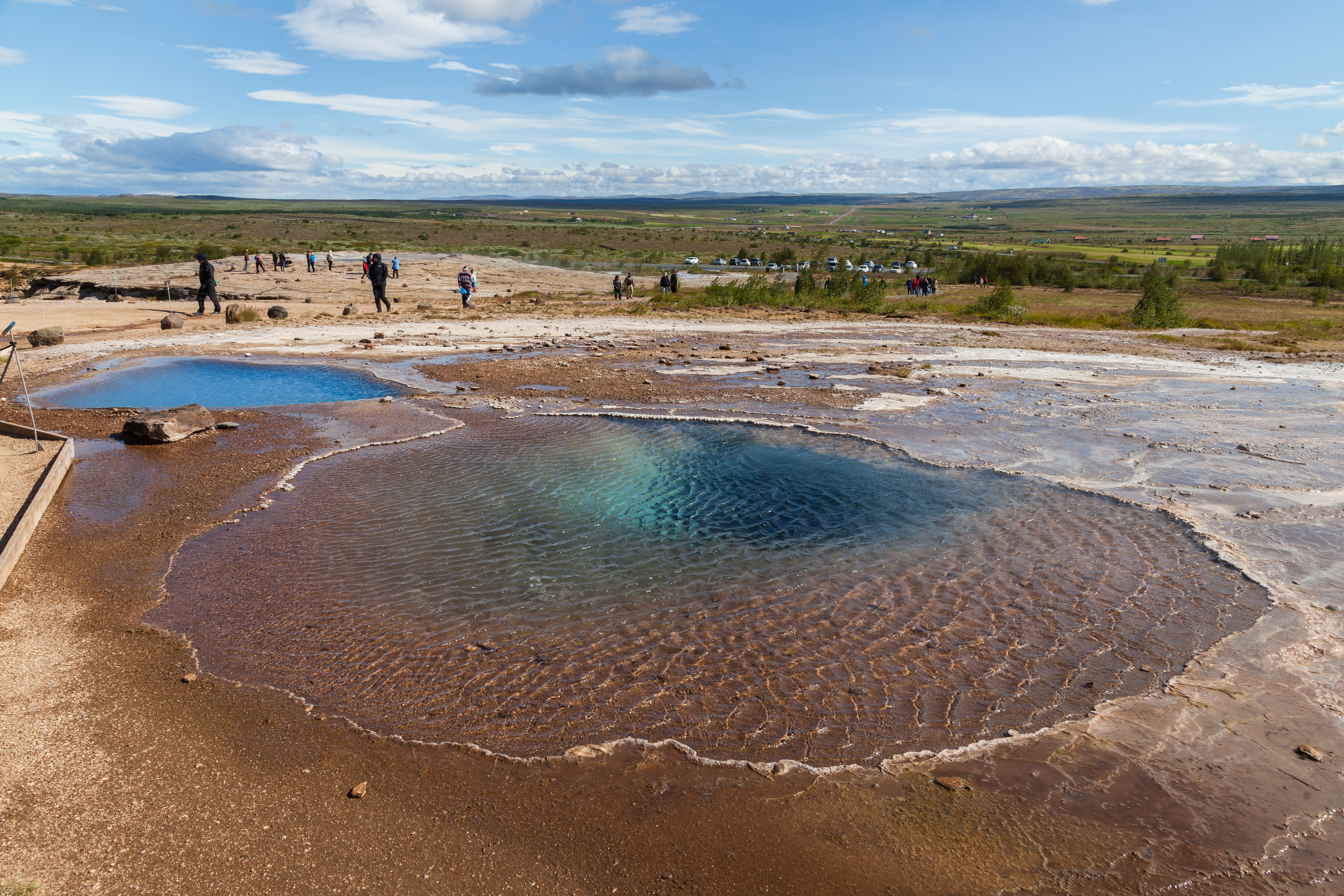
Blesi [ˈplɛːsɪ], geothermal area of Geysir.
