= Eyja- og Miklaholtshreppur =

Coordinates: 64°50′06″N 22°33′45″W

- Municipality
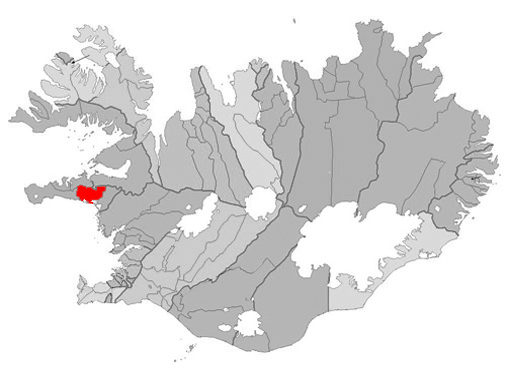
- Location of Eyja- og Miklaholtshreppur

- Location within Iceland
- Country: Iceland
- Region: Western Region
- Constituency: Northwest Constituency

Area
  - Total: 383 km^{2} (148 sq mi)

Population
  - Total: 148
  - Density: 0.39/km^{2} (1.0/sq mi)
- Municipal number: 3713
- Website: eyjaogmikla.is

Eyja- og Miklaholtshreppur (Icelandic pronunciation: [ˈeiːja- ɔːɣ ˈmɪhklaˌhɔl̥(t)sˌr̥ɛhpʏr̥]) is a municipality in Iceland.
