= Mýrdalshreppur =

- Municipality
- Location of the municipality

- Location within Iceland
- Coordinates: 63.4194°N 19.0097°W
- Country: Iceland
- Region: Southern Region
- Constituency: South Constituency

Government
  - Manager: Ásgeir Magnússon

Area
  - Total: 755 km^{2} (292 sq mi)

Population
  - Total: 489
  - Density: 0.65/km^{2} (1.7/sq mi)
- Postal code(s): 870, 871
- Municipal number: 8508
- Website: vik.is

Mýrdalshreppur (Icelandic pronunciation: [ˈmirˌtalsˌr̥ɛhpʏr̥]) is a municipality located in southern Iceland. The main village is Vík.
