= Skeiða- og Gnúpverjahreppur =

- Municipality
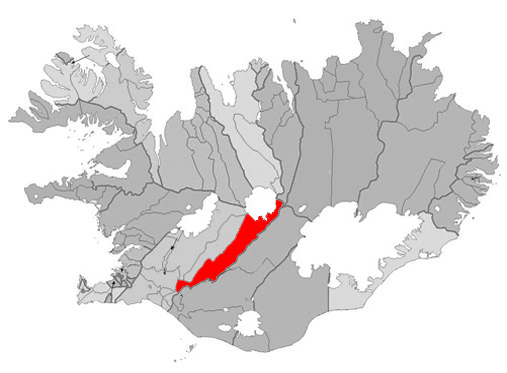
- Location of Skeiða- og Gnúpverjahreppur

- Location within Iceland
- Coordinates: 64°28′50″N 19°11′50″W
- Country: Iceland
- Region: Southern Region
- Constituency: South Constituency

Government
  - Manager: Kristófer Tómasson

Area
  - Total: 2,231 km^{2} (861 sq mi)

Population
  - Total: 530
  - Density: 0.24/km^{2} (0.62/sq mi)
- Municipal number: 8720
- Website: skeidgnup.is

Skeiða- og Gnúpverjahreppur (Icelandic pronunciation: [ˈsceiːða ɔːɣ ˈknupˌvɛrjaˌr̥ɛhpʏr̥], lit. 'Skeiða-and-Gnúpverja Hreppur') is a small municipality in south-central Iceland.
