= Húnabyggð =

- Municipality
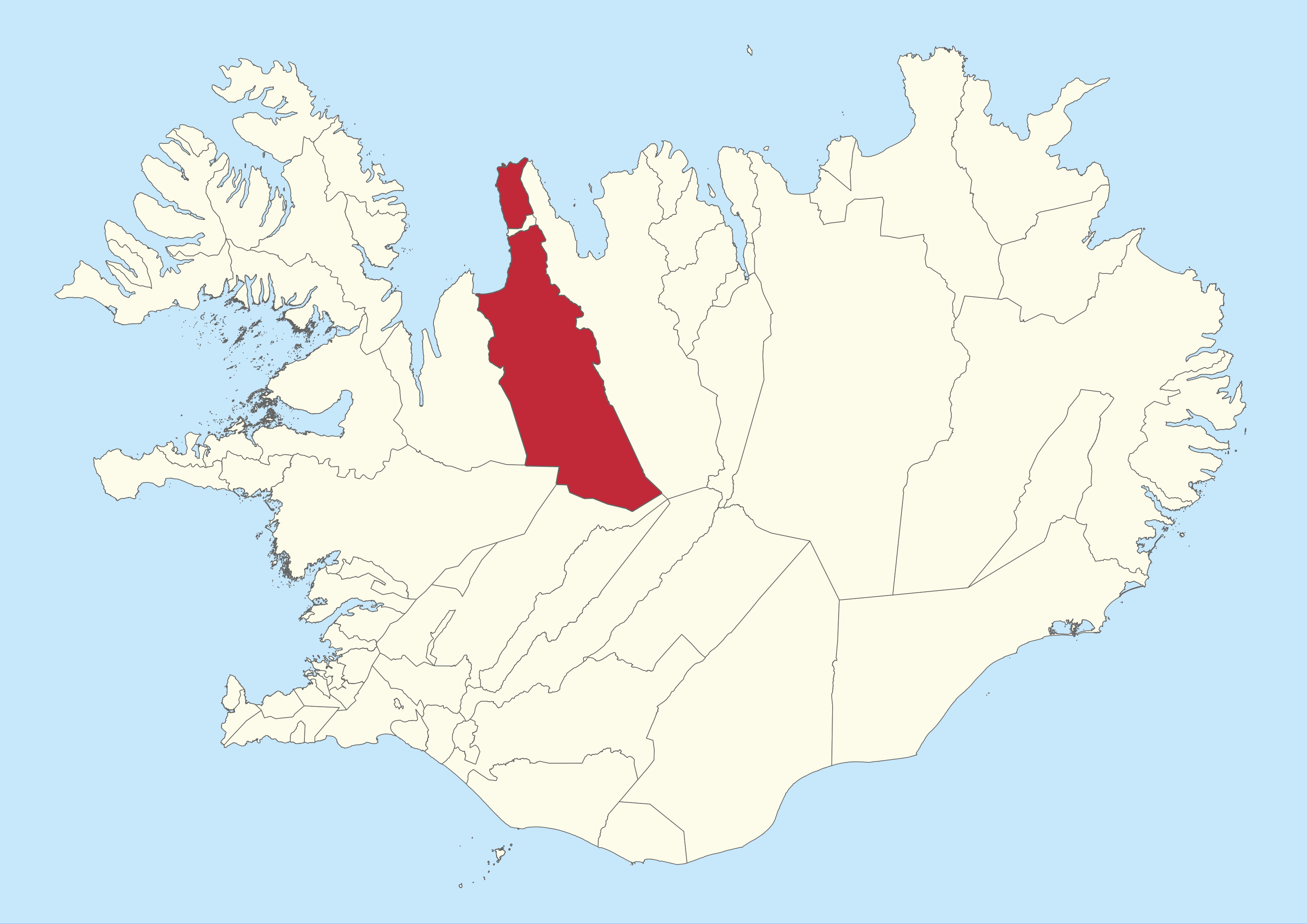
- Location of Húnabyggð since 2024
- Coordinates: 65°40′N 20°18′W
- Country: Iceland
- Region: Northwestern Region
- Constituency: Northwest Constituency
- Established: 1876

Area
  - Total: 4,000 km^{2} (1,500 sq mi)

Population (2021)
  - Total: 1,322
  - Density: 0.33/km^{2} (0.85/sq mi)
- Postal code(s): 540, 541
- Municipal number: 5613

Húnabyggð (Icelandic pronunciation: [ˈhuːnaˌpɪɣθ]) is a municipality in the north of Iceland, which was formed with the merger of Blönduós and Húnavatnshreppur. A vote was held in February 2022 where 97.8% of Blönduós inhabitants and 62.3% of Húnavatnshreppur inhabitants voted in favour of the merge. The merger was finalized in the municipality elections in March 2022.

Húnabyggð is among the largest municipalities of Iceland in terms of area and reaches from Húnaflói (Húna Bay), on which Blönduós is situated, to the interior, in which Langjökull and Hofsjökull are situated. Blönduvirkjun hydropower plant is situated in the municipality.

In June 2024, 90% of Húnabyggð voters and 75% of Skagabyggð voters approved a merger wherein the two municipalities would combine into a larger municipality, also known as Húnabyggð. The merger took effect in August 2024. This effectively extended Húnabyggð's area farther northward along Húnaflói.
