= Húnavatnshreppur =

- Former municipality
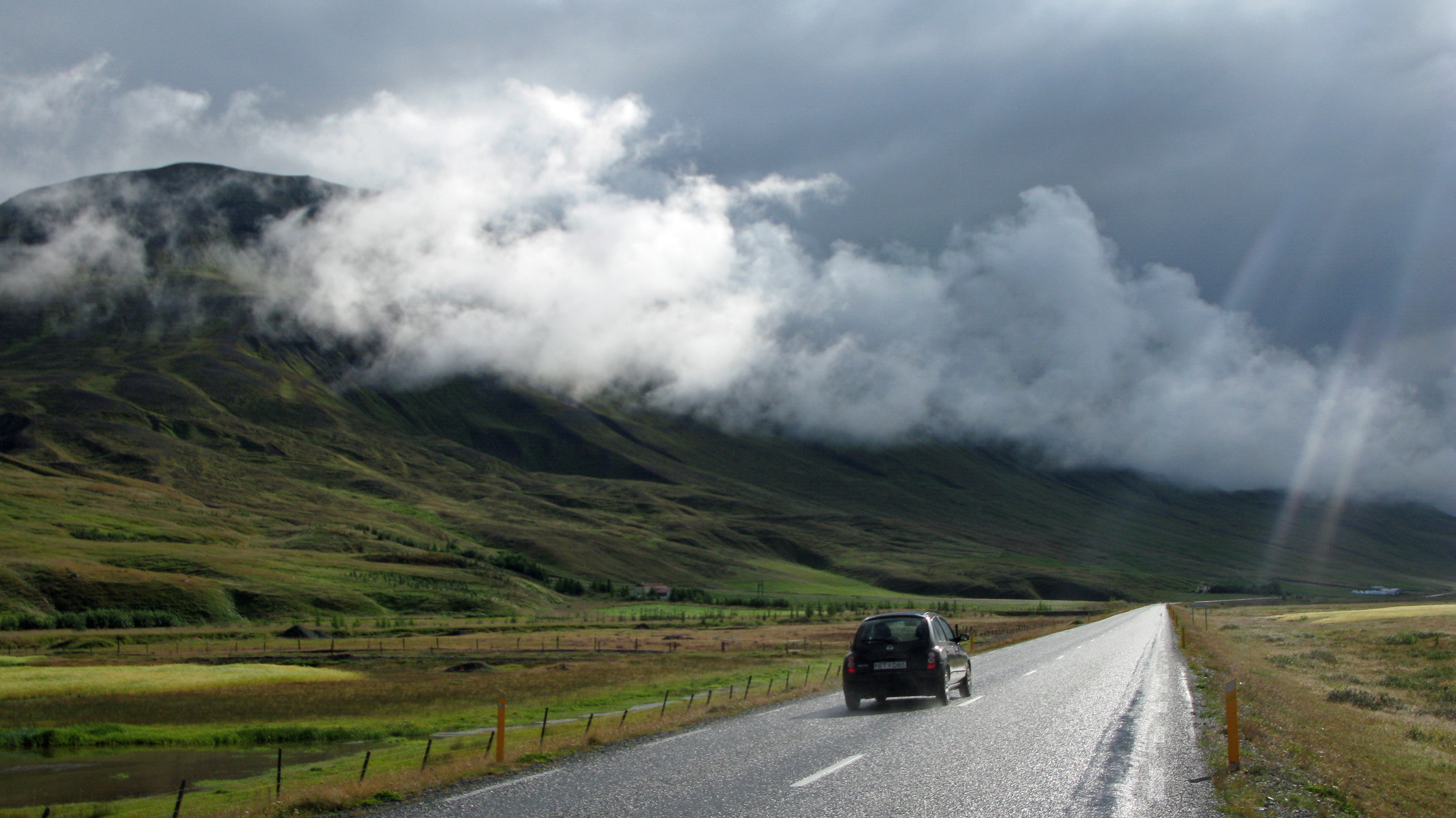
- Skyline of Húnavatnshreppur

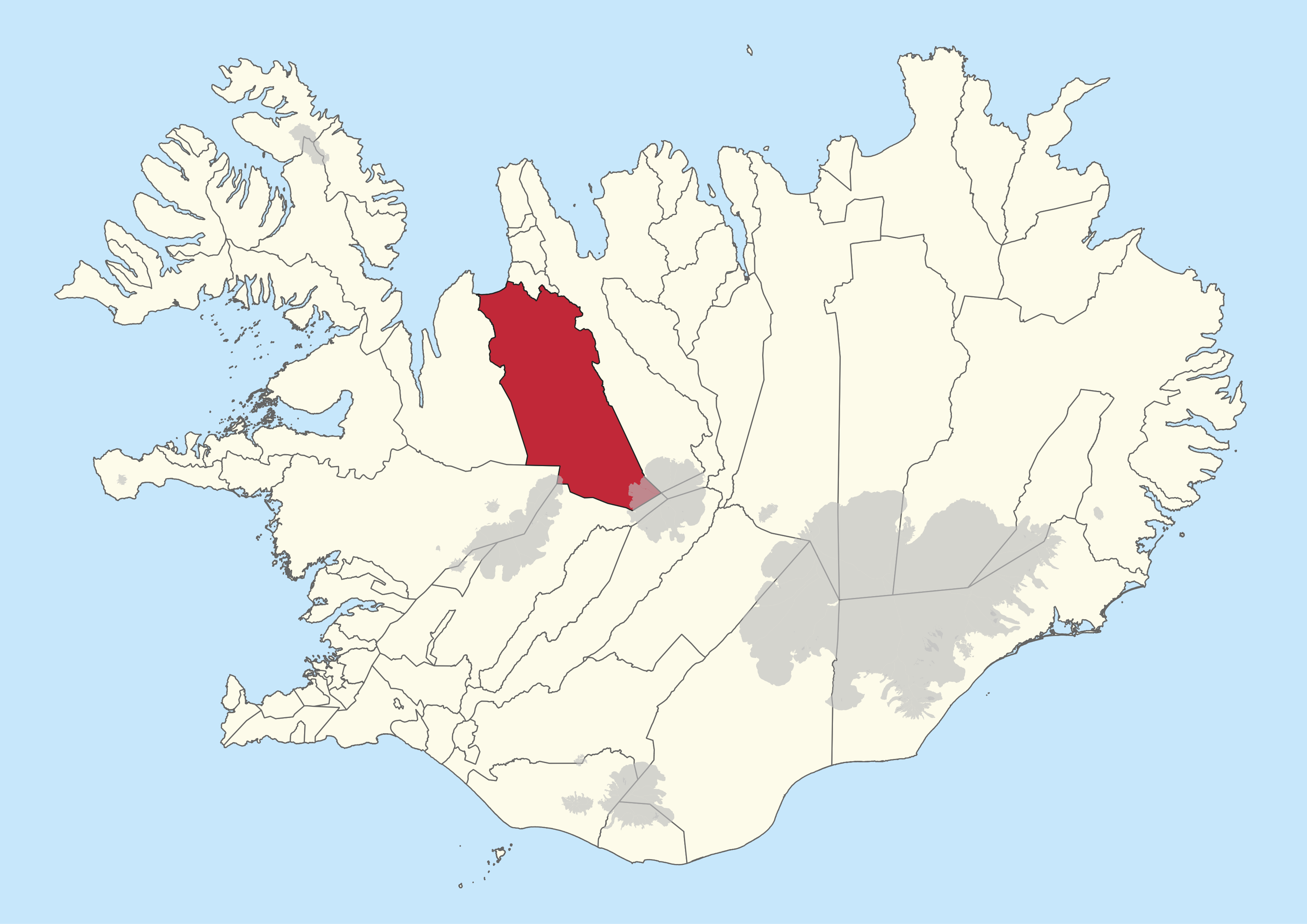
- Location of the municipality

- Location within Iceland
- Coordinates: 65.5158316°N 20.3883425°W
- Country: Iceland
- Region: Northwestern Region
- Constituency: Northwest Constituency
- Municipality: Húnabyggð

Government
  - Manager: Einar Kristján Jónsson

Area
  - Total: 3,817 km^{2} (1,474 sq mi)

Population
  - Total: 409
  - Density: 0.11/km^{2} (0.28/sq mi)
- Website: hunavatnshreppur.is

Húnavatnshreppur (Icelandic pronunciation: [ˈhuːnaˌvasːˌr̥ɛhpʏr̥]) is a former rural municipality located in northwestern Iceland.

== History ==
The municipality was formed on 1 January 2006 by the union of the former municipalities of Sveinsstaðahreppur [ˈsveinsˌstaːðaˌr̥ehpʏr̥], Torfalækjarhreppur [ˈtʰɔrvaˌlaiːcar̥ˌr̥ɛhpʏr̥], Svínavatnshreppur [ˈsviːnaˌvasːˌr̥ɛhpʏr̥] and Bólstaðarhlíðarhreppur [ˈpoulˌstaːðarˌl̥iːðar̥ˌr̥ɛhpʏr̥]. In 2022, the municipality merged with Blönduós to form Húnabyggð.

== Geography ==
Húnavatn is one of the largest Icelandic municipalities. Its southern borders touch the glaciers of Hofsjökull and Langjökull. In the south are situated also the hot springs in Hveravellir.
