= Blönduós =

- Town
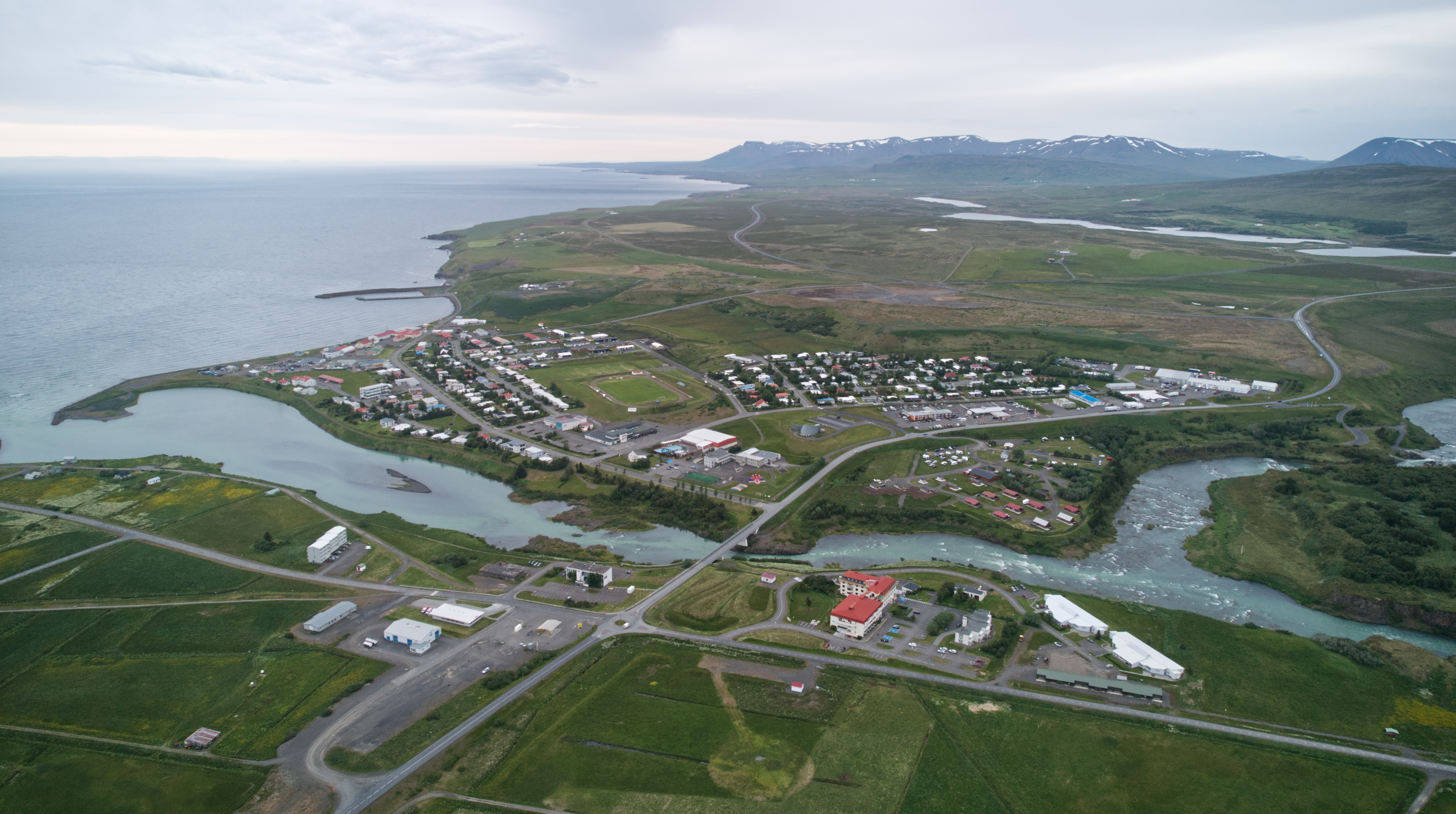

- Location within Iceland
- Coordinates: 65°40′N 20°18′W
- Country: Iceland
- Region: Northwestern Region
- Constituency: Northwest Constituency
- Municipality: Húnabyggð
- Established: 1876

Area
  - Total: 183 km^{2} (71 sq mi)

Population
  - Total: 895
  - Density: 4.73/km^{2} (12.3/sq mi)
- Postal code(s): 540, 541
- Website: blonduos.is

Blönduós (Icelandic pronunciation: [ˈplœntʏˌouːs]) is a town and former municipality in the north of Iceland with a population of 895 in 2018. Like many towns and villages around Iceland, Blönduós did not emerge as a village until the late 19th century. The town is situated on Route 1 at the mouth of the glacial river Blanda. Hrútey [ˈr̥uːtˌeiː], a small island and natural reserve encircled by the river, is accessible via a pedestrian bridge just off the ring road. In 2022, the town merged with Húnavatnshreppur to form Húnabyggð.

== Geography ==
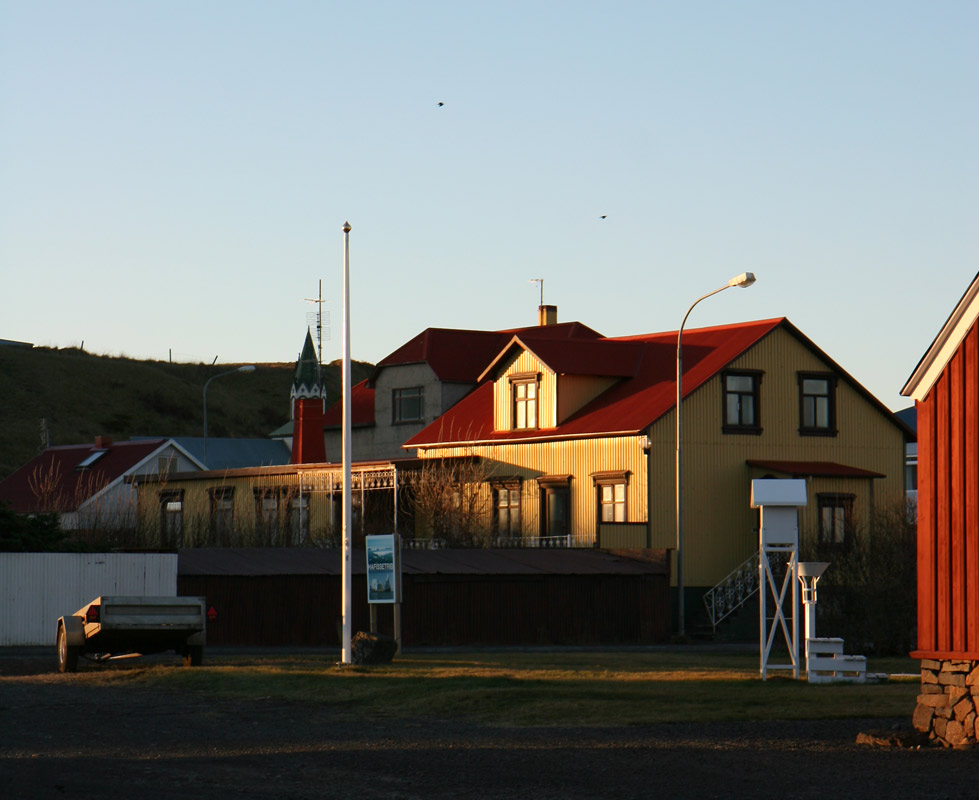
Houses in Blönduós

One of Blönduós' main characteristics is that the town is split into two parts by the glacial river Blanda, for which it is named (Blöndu is an oblique case of Blanda). The old part of town (Icelandic: "gamli bærinn"), including many original houses from the late 19th and early 20th century, is located on the south side of the river. Many of the local companies, the elementary school, supermarket, community center and sports facilities including a modern outdoor heated pool are located on the north side. On a hill above town is a church with striking architecture that is intended to resemble a volcanic crater.

== Economy ==
Most of the industry and livelihood in Blönduós evolve around service for agriculture and tourism. In recent years, the town has become known for its connection with textiles. A wool washery, Iceland's only textile museum Heimilisiðnaðarsafnið and the Icelandic Textile Center, featuring a residency program for international textile artists and scholars, are all located in Blönduós.

== Notable people ==
- Þorvaldur Skúlason (1906–1984), abstract painter, lived in Blönduós 1909–1924
- Reynir Grétarsson (born 1972), Icelandic entrepreneur, philanthropist, Icelandic map collector and author of "About Mapping Iceland" Founder and former CEO[1] and current chairman of the Board of Creditinfo Group
- María Ólafsdóttir (born 1993), singer, musician and actress
- Eydís Evensen (born 1994), composer, singer and musician

== Twin towns – sister cities ==
Blönduós is twinned with:

- Horsens, Denmark
- Karlstad, Sweden
- Moss, Norway
- Nokia, Finland

== Climate ==
Blönduós has a tundra climate (ET).

Climate data for Blönduós (1971–2000)
Month	Jan	Feb	Mar	Apr	May	Jun	Jul	Aug	Sep	Oct	Nov	Dec	Year
Record high °C (°F)	11.4 (52.5)	12.1 (53.8)	13.7 (56.7)	17.2 (63.0)	19.8 (67.6)	23.0 (73.4)	23.2 (73.8)	20.5 (68.9)	20.3 (68.5)	18.5 (65.3)	15.1 (59.2)	12.6 (54.7)	23.2 (73.8)
Mean daily maximum °C (°F)	0.6 (33.1)	1.1 (34.0)	1.7 (35.1)	4.3 (39.7)	8.1 (46.6)	11.2 (52.2)	13.0 (55.4)	12.7 (54.9)	9.5 (49.1)	5.5 (41.9)	2.3 (36.1)	0.9 (33.6)	5.9 (42.6)
Daily mean °C (°F)	−2.3 (27.9)	−2.1 (28.2)	−1.4 (29.5)	1.0 (33.8)	4.8 (40.6)	7.7 (45.9)	9.5 (49.1)	9.3 (48.7)	6.0 (42.8)	2.6 (36.7)	−0.4 (31.3)	−2.0 (28.4)	2.7 (36.9)
Mean daily minimum °C (°F)	−5.8 (21.6)	−5.0 (23.0)	−4.3 (24.3)	−2.0 (28.4)	1.8 (35.2)	4.8 (40.6)	7.0 (44.6)	6.5 (43.7)	3.4 (38.1)	0.1 (32.2)	−3.3 (26.1)	−5.4 (22.3)	−0.2 (31.7)
Record low °C (°F)	−20.9 (−5.6)	−21.8 (−7.2)	−24.3 (−11.7)	−19.6 (−3.3)	−10.5 (13.1)	−3.6 (25.5)	−0.6 (30.9)	−4.4 (24.1)	−7.2 (19.0)	−12.1 (10.2)	−17.0 (1.4)	−21.0 (−5.8)	−24.3 (−11.7)
Average precipitation mm (inches)	40.6 (1.60)	34.2 (1.35)	42.5 (1.67)	31.1 (1.22)	30.1 (1.19)	37.1 (1.46)	44.3 (1.74)	44.5 (1.75)	43.2 (1.70)	51.6 (2.03)	37.6 (1.48)	38.5 (1.52)	475.3 (18.71)
Source: Icelandic Met Office (extremes 1952–2003, excluding 1963–67 due to lack of data); All statistics between 1968 and autumn of 1981 are for Hjaltabakki, 2.9 km (1.8 mi) from Blönduós)
