= Western Region (Iceland) =

Region of Iceland

Western Region Vesturland (Icelandic)
- Region
- The Vesturland area
- Coordinates: 64°32′N 21°55′W
- Country: Iceland
- Largest town: Akranes

Area
  - Total: 9,527 km^{2} (3,678 sq mi)

Population (2024)
  - Total: 17,419
  - Density: 1.83/km^{2} (4.7/sq mi)
- Time zone: UTC+00:00 (WET)
  - Summer (DST): (Not Observed)
- ISO 3166 code: IS-3

Western Region (Icelandic: Vesturland, pronounced [ˈvɛstʏrˌlant]) is one of the traditional eight regions of Iceland, located on the western coast of the island. As of 2024, the region has a population of 17,419.
