= Northeastern Region (Iceland) =

Region of Iceland

Northeastern Region Norðurland eystra (Icelandic)
- Region
- The Norðurland eystra area
- Coordinates: 65°41′N 18°06′W
- Country: Iceland
- Largest town: Akureyri

Area
  - Total: 22,677 km^{2} (8,756 sq mi)

Population (2024)
  - Total: 31,574
  - Density: 1.39/km^{2} (3.6/sq mi)
- Time zone: UTC+00:00 (WET)
  - Summer (DST): (Not Observed)
- ISO 3166 code: IS-6

Northeastern Region (Icelandic: Norðurland eystra, pronounced [ˈnɔrðʏrˌlant ˈeistra]) is one of the traditional eight regions of Iceland, located in the north of the island. The biggest town in the region is Akureyri, with a population of 19,542 in 2024.
