= Southern Region (Iceland) =

Region of Iceland

Southern Region Suðurland (Icelandic)
- Region
- The Suðurland area
- Coordinates: 63°55′59″N 20°59′49″W
- Country: Iceland
- Largest town: Selfoss

Area
  - Total: 30,983 km^{2} (11,963 sq mi)

Population (2024)
  - Total: 34,076
  - Density: 1.1/km^{2} (2.8/sq mi)
- Time zone: UTC+00:00 (WET)
  - Summer (DST): (Not Observed)
- ISO 3166 code: IS-8

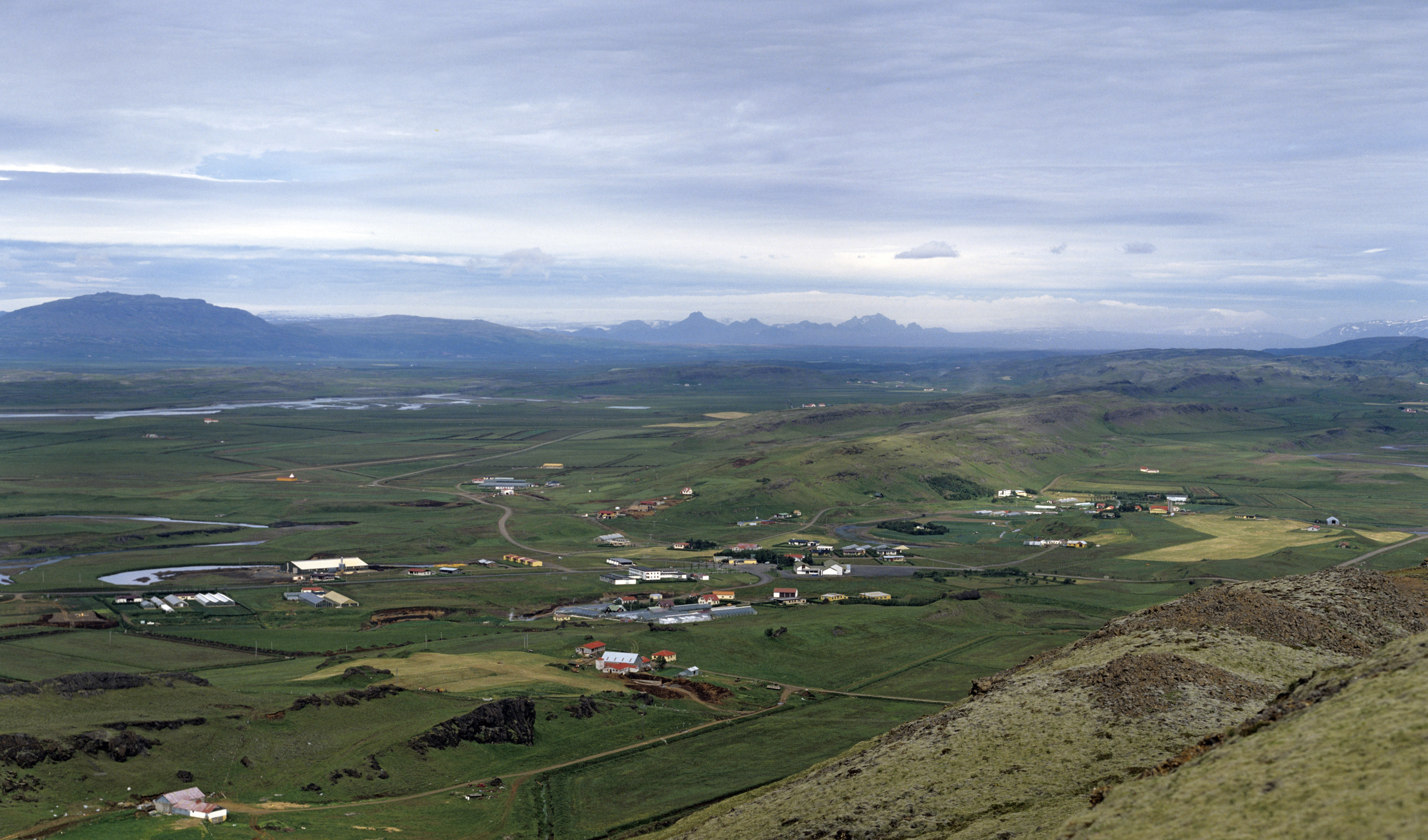
Suðurland, seen from Flúðir

Southern Region (Icelandic: Suðurland, pronounced [ˈsʏːðʏrˌlant], lit. 'Southern Land') is a region of Iceland. The population of the region was 34,076 (1 January 2024). The largest town in the region is Selfoss, with a population of 9,812 as of 2024.
