= Northwestern Region (Iceland) =

Region of Iceland

Northwestern Region Norðurland vestra (Icelandic)
- Region
- The Norðurland vestra area
- Coordinates: 65°44′46″N 19°38′22″W
- Country: Iceland
- Largest town: Sauðárkrókur

Area
  - Total: 13,108 km^{2} (5,061 sq mi)

Population (2024)
  - Total: 7,294
  - Density: 0.56/km^{2} (1.5/sq mi)
- Time zone: UTC+00:00 (WET)
  - Summer (DST): (Not Observed)
- ISO 3166 code: IS-5

Northwestern Region (Icelandic: Norðurland vestra, pronounced [ˈnɔrðʏrˌlant ˈvɛstra]) is one of the traditional eight regions of Iceland, located in the north of the island. The largest town in the region is Sauðárkrókur, with a population of 2,609 in 2024.

One of the primary attractions of the area is the basalt rock Hvítserkur, 15 meters high and resembles a dragon that throws its head to take a sip of water.
