= Postal codes in Iceland =

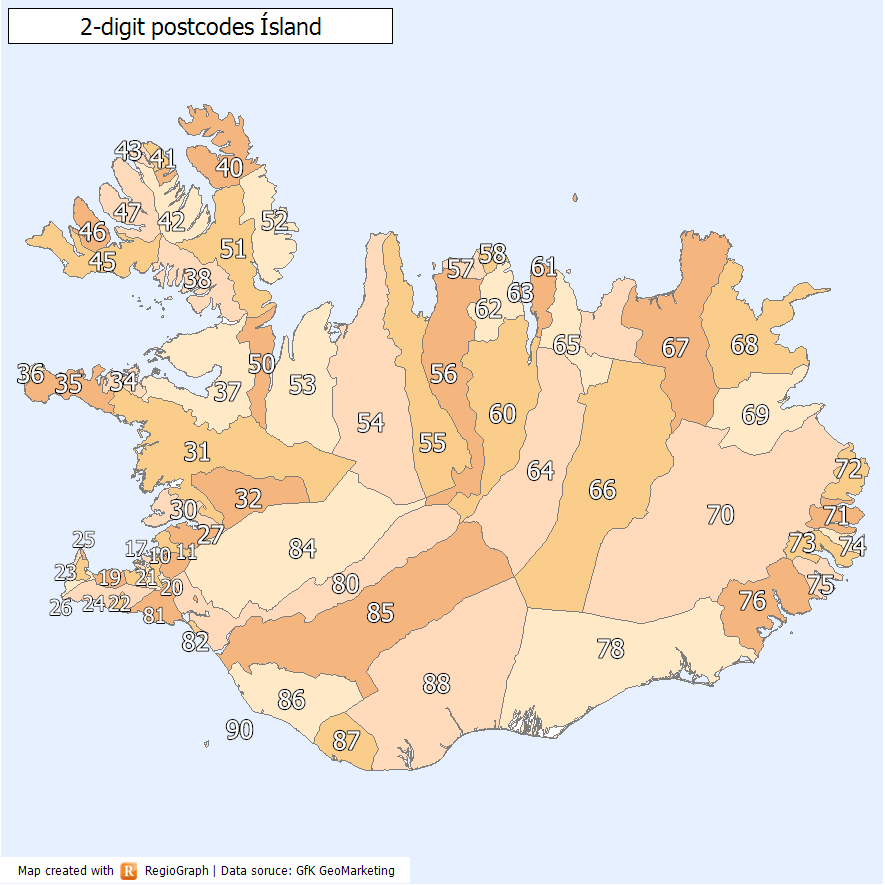
2-digit postal code areas in Iceland (defined through the first two postal code digits)

Postal codes in Iceland are made up of three digits and were introduced in 1977. The codes are followed by the name of the place where the post is being distributed, which is either a municipality, the nearest city, town or village.

The total number of postal codes is 149; with 18 reserved for post-office boxes, two for public institutes and larger private companies and one used for international sorting purposes only. The first digit is ordered approximately clockwise around the country starting from Reykjavík.

== See also ==
- Addresses in Iceland
