= Constituencies of Iceland =

Constituencies of Iceland

Iceland is divided into six constituencies for the purpose of selecting representatives to parliament.

== History ==
The current division was established by a 1999 constitution amendment and was an attempt to balance the weight of different districts of the country whereby voters in the rural districts have greater representation per head than voters in Reykjavík city and its suburbs. The new division comprises three countryside constituencies (NW, NE and S) and three city constituencies (RN, RS and SW). The imbalance of votes between city and country still exists and a provision in the election law states that if the number of votes per seat in parliament in one constituency goes below half of what it is in any other constituency, one seat shall be transferred between them. This has occurred three times, in the elections in 2007, 2013 and 2024. On each occasion, a seat was transferred from the Northwest constituency to the Southwest constituency.

== Composition ==
The constituencies are the following:

Data for the table below is current as of the 2017 election:

Constituency		Electors	Seats	Electors per seat	% (Note: Electors per seat as percent of the highest number in any constituency.)
English	Icelandic	Electors	Seats	Electors per seat	%
Reykjavík North	Reykjavíkurkjördæmi norður	46,073	11	4,188	78.3%
Reykjavík South	Reykjavíkurkjördæmi suður	45,584	11	4,144	77.5%
Southwest	Suðvesturkjördæmi	69,544	14	5,350	100.0%
Northwest	Norðvesturkjördæmi	21,521	7	2,690	50.3%
Northeast	Norðausturkjördæmi	29,620	10	2,836	55.4%
South	Suðurkjördæmi	36,143	10	3,251	67.6%
Source: Statistics Iceland

== See also ==
- Administrative divisions of Iceland
- Geography of Iceland
- Municipalities of Iceland
- Regions of Iceland
