= Localities of Iceland =

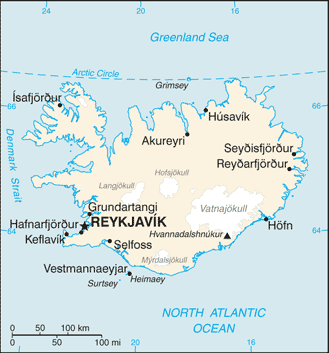
Map of Iceland

Most municipalities in Iceland include more than one settlement. For example, four localities (Selfoss, Stokkseyri, Eyrarbakki, and Tjarnabyggð) can all be found in the municipality of Árborg.

A number of municipalities only contain a single locality, while there are also a few municipalities in which no localities exist. All localities in Iceland can only be located within a single municipality, i.e. they cannot straddle multiple municipality borders. Some municipalities, such as Hafnarfjörður and Akranes, also share the same name with a locality. However, these localities are not always situated in their namesake municipalities. In those cases, this does not necessarily mean that they there are no other localities included in that particular municipality. Even when they are the only locality there, they do not always encompass the span of that municipality's entire land area.

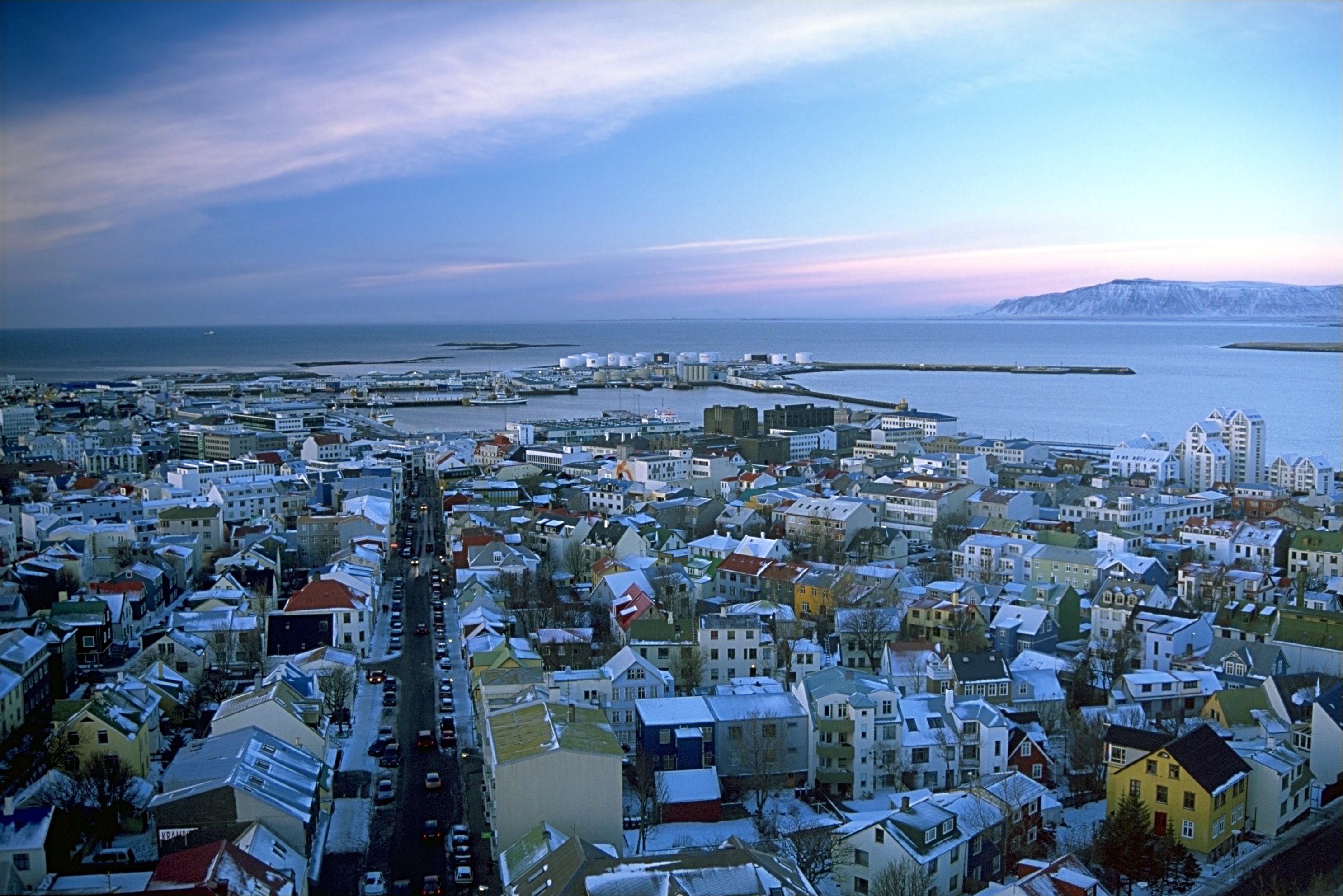
Reykjavík, Capital of Iceland

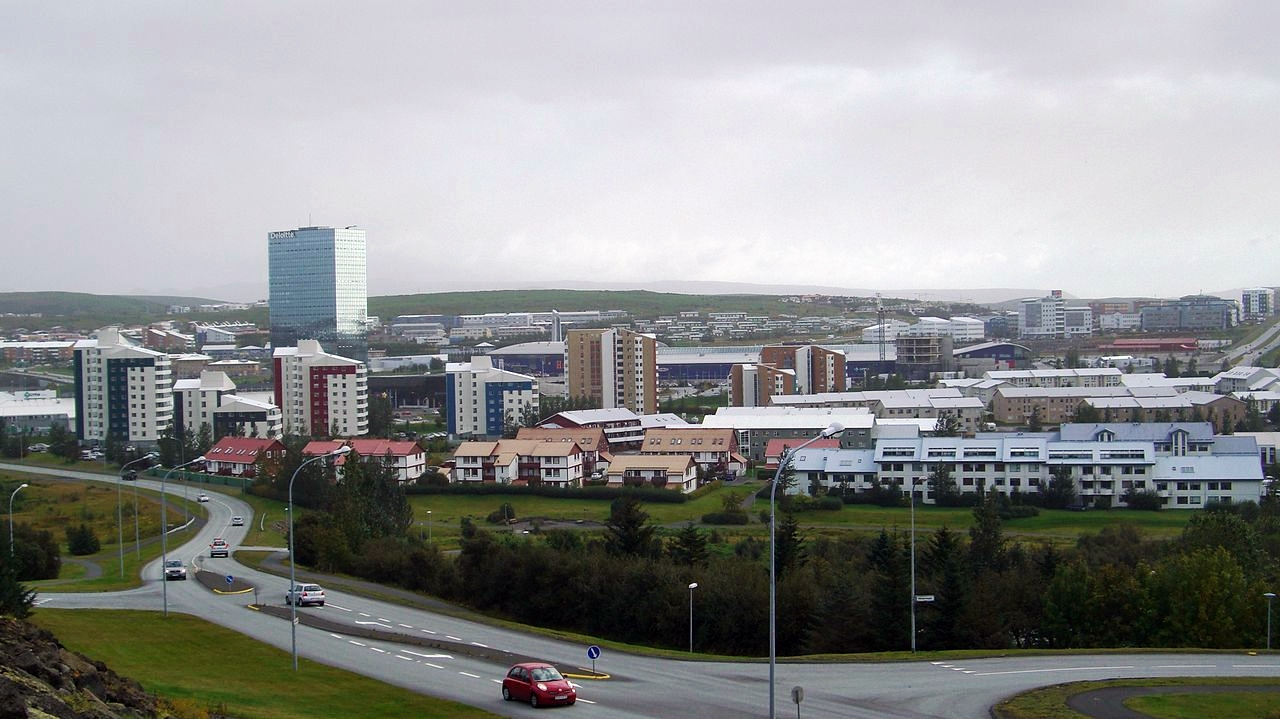
Kópavogur

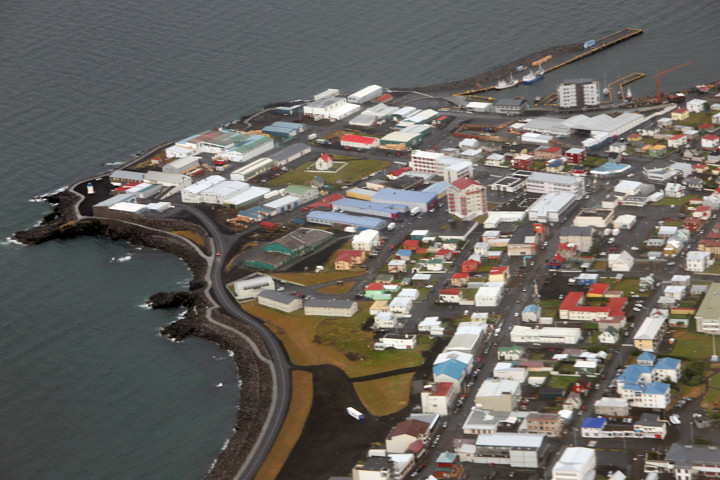
Reykjanesbær

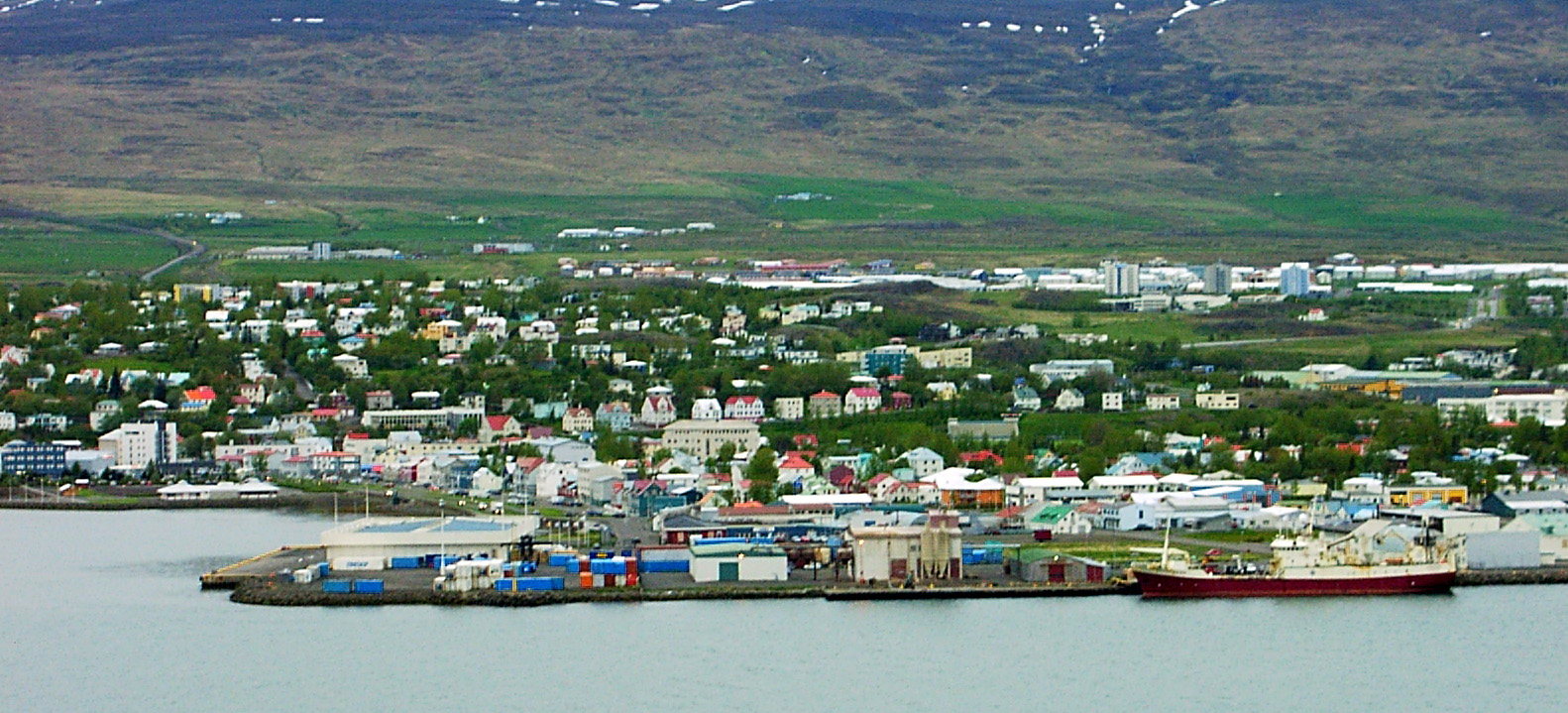
Akureyri

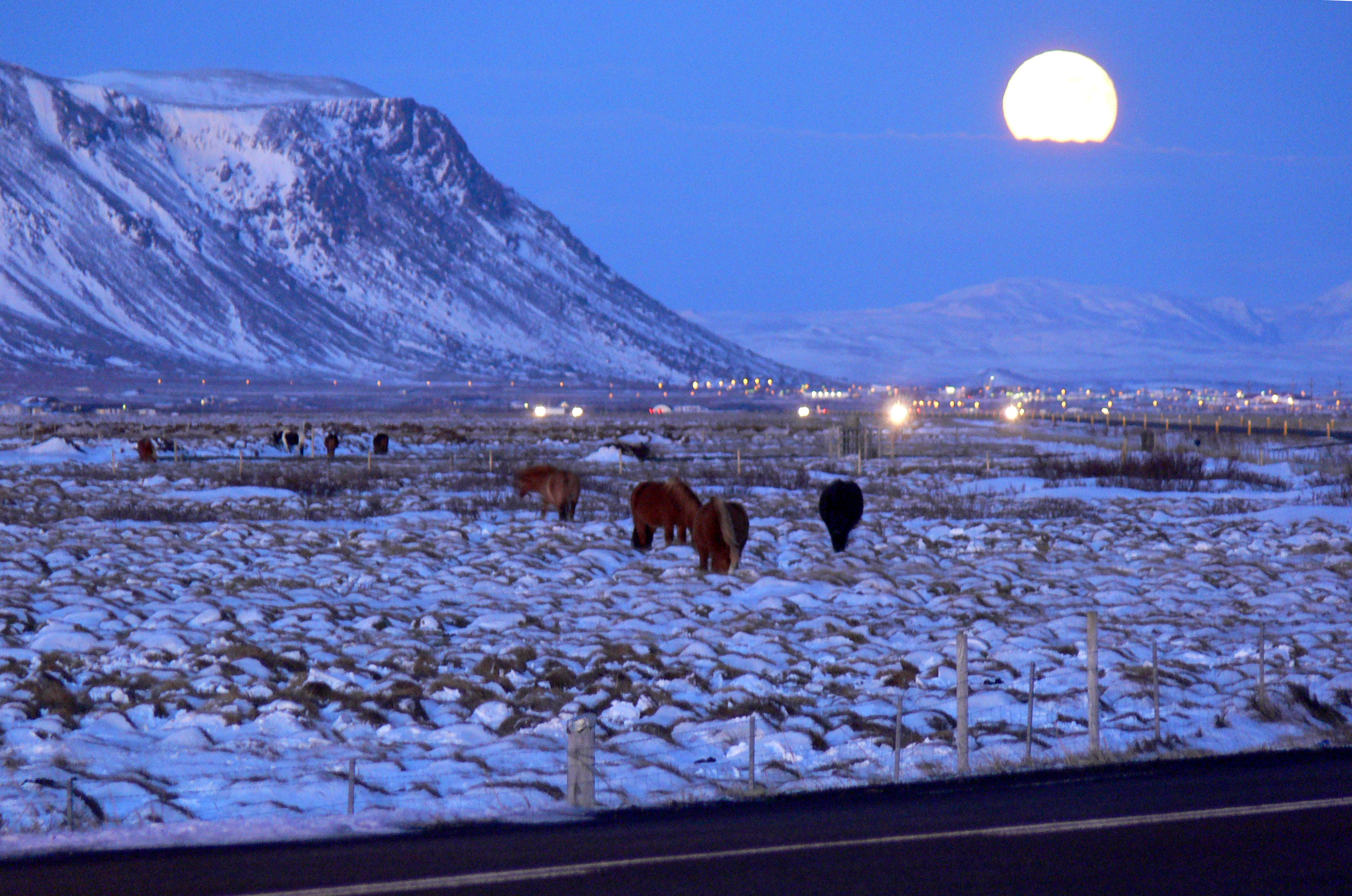
Selfoss

== List of localities by population ==
The majority of the functions that are carried out by local governments actually happen at the municipal level. However, most settlements in Iceland are broken down further into the "locality" level, which are mainly used for information collection and statistical analysis purposes only—essentially, a census division.

Rank	Name	Population		Change (since 2013)	Municipality	Region
Rank	Name	2013	2018	Change (since 2013)	Municipality	Region
1	Reykjavík	118,918	124,847	▲5%	Reykjavík	Höfuðborgarsvæðið
2	Kópavogur	31,719	35,966	▲13.4%	Kópavogur	Höfuðborgarsvæðið
3	Hafnarfjörður	26,800	29,409	▲9.7%	Hafnarfjörður	Höfuðborgarsvæðið
4	Akureyri	17,693	18,542	▲4.8%	Akureyri	Norðurland eystra
5	Reykjanesbær	14,153	17,555	▲24%	Reykjanesbær	Suðurnes
6	Garðabær	11,421	12,912	▲13.1%	Garðabær	Höfuðborgarsvæðið
7	Mosfellsbær	8,651	10,225	▲18.2%	Mosfellsbær	Höfuðborgarsvæðið
8	Selfoss	6,510	7,564	▲16.2%	Árborg	Suðurland
9	Akranes	6,612	7,249	▲9.6%	Akranes	Vesturland
10	Seltjarnarnes	4,322	4,575	▲5.9%	Seltjarnarnes	Höfuðborgarsvæðið
11	Vestmannaeyjar	4,219	4,284	▲1.5%	Vestmannaeyjar	Suðurland
12	Grindavík	2,856	3,319	▲16.2%	Grindavíkurbær	Suðurnes
13	Ísafjörður	2,624	2,625	0%	Ísafjarðarbær	Vestfirðir
14	Álftanes	2,392	2,586	▲8.1%	Garðabær	Höfuðborgarsvæðið
15	Sauðárkrókur	2,575	2,574	0%	Skagafjörður	Norðurland vestra
16	Hveragerði	2,288	2,564	▲12.1%	Hveragerði	Suðurland
17	Egilsstaðir	2,303	2,464	▲7%	Múlaþing	Austurland
18	Húsavík	2,228	2,323	▲4.3%	Norðurþing	Norðurland eystra
19	Borgarnes	1,759	1,962	▲11.5%	Borgarbyggð	Vesturland
20	Sandgerði	1,546	1,753	▲13.4%	Suðurnesjabær	Suðurnes
21	Höfn	1,690	1,677	▼0.8%	Hornafjörður	Austurland
22	Þorlákshöfn	1,489	1,651	▲10.9%	Ölfus	Suðurland
23	Garður	1,429	1,595	▲11.6%	Suðurnesjabær	Suðurnes
24	Neskaupstaður	1,466	1,469	▲0.2%	Fjarðabyggð	Austurland
25	Dalvík	1,359	1,367	▲0.6%	Dalvíkurbyggð	Norðurland eystra
26	Reyðarfjörður	1,152	1,270	▲10.2%	Fjarðabyggð	Austurland
27	Siglufjörður	1,190	1,183	▼0.6%	Fjallabyggð	Norðurland eystra
28	Vogar	1,029	1,183	▲15%	Vogar	Suðurnes
29	Stykkishólmur	1,108	1,173	▲5.9%	Stykkishólmur	Vesturland
30	Eskifjörður	1,014	1,006	▼0.8%	Fjarðabyggð	Austurland
31	Ólafsvík	1,010	970	▼4%	Snæfellsbær	Vesturland
32	Hvolsvöllur	902	931	▲3.2%	Rangárþing eystra	Suðurland
33	Bolungarvík	894	924	▲3.4%	Bolungarvík	Vestfirðir
34	Hella	784	861	▲9.8%	Rangárþing ytra	Suðurland
35	Grundarfjörður	852	834	▼2.1%	Grundarfjarðarbær	Vesturland
36	Blönduós	813	821	▲1%	Blönduósbær	Norðurland vestra
37	Ólafsfjörður	790	791	▲0.1%	Fjallabyggð	Norðurland eystra
38	Fáskrúðsfjörður	654	712	▲8.9%	Fjarðabyggð	Austurland
39	Patreksfjörður	651	677	▲4%	Vesturbyggð	Vestfirðir
40	Seyðisfjörður	658	663	▲0.8%	Múlaþing	Austurland
41	Grundarhverfi	528	587	▲11.2%	Reykjavík	Höfuðborgarsvæðið
42	Hvammstangi	546	578	▲5.9%	Húnaþing vestra	Norðurland vestra
43	Stokkseyri	465	528	▲13.5%	Árborg	Suðurland
44	Eyrarbakki	531	526	▼0.9%	Árborg	Suðurland
45	Vopnafjörður	543	526	▼3.1%	Vopnafjarðarhreppur	Austurland
46	Skagaströnd	501	477	▼4.8%	Skagaströnd	Norðurland vestra
47	Flúðir	420	432	▲2.9%	Hrunamannahreppur	Suðurland
48	Vík	276	402	▲45.7%	Mýrdalshreppur	Suðurland
49	Fellabær	403	395	▼2%	Múlaþing	Austurland
50	Hellissandur	389	365	▼6.2%	Snæfellsbær	Vesturland
51	Djúpivogur	348	357	▲2.6%	Múlaþing	Austurland
52	Þórshöfn	379	352	▼7.1%	Langanesbyggð	Norðurland eystra
53	Svalbarðseyri	271	337	▲24.4%	Svalbarðsstrandarhreppur	Norðurland eystra
54	Hólmavík	391	320	▼18.2%	Strandabyggð	Vestfirðir
55	Grenivík	278	297	▲6.8%	Grýtubakkahreppur	Norðurland eystra
56	Hvanneyri	251	285	▲13.5%	Borgarbyggð	Vesturland
57	Þingeyri	262	276	▲5.3%	Ísafjarðarbær	Vestfirðir
58	Búðardalur	252	272	▲7.9%	Dalabyggð	Vesturland
59	Reykholt	206	270	▲31.1%	Bláskógabyggð	Suðurland
60	Hrafnagil	263	257	▼2.3%	Eyjafjarðarsveit	Norðurland eystra
61	Suðureyri	264	257	▼2.7%	Ísafjarðarbær	Vestfirðir
62	Tálknafjörður	275	231	▼16%	Tálknafjarðarhreppur	Vestfirðir
63	Bíldudalur	170	225	▲32.4%	Vesturbyggð	Vestfirðir
64	Mosfellsdalur	203	224	▲10.3%	Mosfellsbær	Höfuðborgarsvæðið
65	Hnífsdalur	216	208	▼3.7%	Ísafjarðarbær	Vestfirðir
66	Reykjahlíð	153	208	▲35.9%	Skútustaðahreppur	Norðurland eystra
67	Laugarvatn	147	191	▲29.9%	Bláskógabyggð	Suðurland
68	Raufarhöfn	169	186	▲10.1%	Norðurþing	Norðurland eystra
69	Stöðvarfjörður	189	184	▼2.6%	Fjarðabyggð	Austurland
70	Bifröst	246	179	▼27.2%	Borgarbyggð	Vesturland
71	Flateyri	199	177	▼11.1%	Ísafjarðarbær	Vestfirðir
72	Kirkjubæjarklaustur	119	176	▲47.9%	Skaftárhreppur	Suðurland
73	Súðavík	145	157	▲8.3%	Súðavíkurhreppur	Vestfirðir
74	Hrísey	171	151	▼11.7%	Akureyri	Norðurland eystra
75	Hofsós	181	147	▼18.8%	Skagafjörður	Norðurland vestra
76	Breiðdalsvík	130	137	▲5.4%	Fjarðabyggð	Austurland
77	Rif	163	135	▼17.2%	Snæfellsbær	Vesturland
78	Reykhólar	133	130	▼2.3%	Reykhólahreppur	Vestfirðir
79	Varmahlíð	128	127	▼0.8%	Skagafjörður	Norðurland vestra
80	Kópasker	122	122	0%	Norðurþing	Norðurland eystra
81	Laugarás	106	116	▲9.4%	Bláskógabyggð	Suðurland
82	Borg	75	112	▲49.3%	Grafningshreppur	Suðurland
83	Hauganes	105	111	▲5.7%	Dalvíkurbyggð	Norðurland eystra
84	Hafnir	76	110	▲44.7%	Reykjanesbær	Suðurnes
85	Laugar	111	109	▼1.8%	Þingeyjarsveit	Norðurland eystra
86	Melahverfi	115	107	▼7%	Hvalfjarðarsveit	Vesturland
87	Tjarnabyggð	81	106	▲30.9%	Árborg	Suðurland
88	Árskógssandur	112	102	▼8.9%	Dalvíkurbyggð	Norðurland eystra
89	Lónsbakki	104	102	▼1.9%	Hörgársveit	Norðurland eystra
90	Hólar	78	94	▲20.5%	Skagafjörður	Norðurland vestra
91	Nesjahverfi	71	92	▲29.6%	Hornafjörður	Austurland
92	Sólheimar	95	91	▼4.2%	Grafningshreppur	Suðurland
93	Brúnahlíð	62	85	▲37.1%	Eyjafjarðarsveit	Norðurland eystra
94	Drangsnes	69	77	▲11.6%	Kaldrananeshreppur	Vestfirðir
95	Borgarfjörður eystri	86	76	▼11.6%	Borgarfjarðarhreppur	Austurland
96	Árbæjarhverfi	54	74	▲37%	Ölfus	Suðurland
97	Brautarholt	54	70	▲29.6%	Gnúpverjahreppur	Suðurland
98	Rauðalækur	36	68	▲88.9%	Rangárþing ytra	Suðurland
99	Bakkafjörður	78	65	▼16.7%	Langanesbyggð	Norðurland eystra
100	Innnes	56	65	▲16.1%	Hvalfjarðarsveit	Vesturland
101	Grímsey	76	61	▼19.7%	Akureyri	Norðurland eystra
102	Þykkvabær	53	59	▲11.3%	Rangárþing ytra	Suðurland
103	Laugarbakki	48	57	▲18.8%	Húnaþing vestra	Norðurland vestra
104	Reykholt	36	56	▲55.6%	Borgarbyggð	Vesturland
105	Árnes	37	53	▲43.2%	Gnúpverjahreppur	Suðurland
106	Kristnes	56	52	▼7.1%	Eyjafjarðarsveit	Norðurland eystra
107	Kleppjárnsreykir	51	43	▼15.7%	Borgarbyggð	Vesturland

== See also ==
- Government of Iceland
- Administrative divisions of Iceland
- Regions of Iceland
- Municipalities of Iceland
- Largest metropolitan areas in the Nordic countries
