= Egilsstaðir Airport =

Egilsstaðir Airport Egilsstaðaflugvöllur

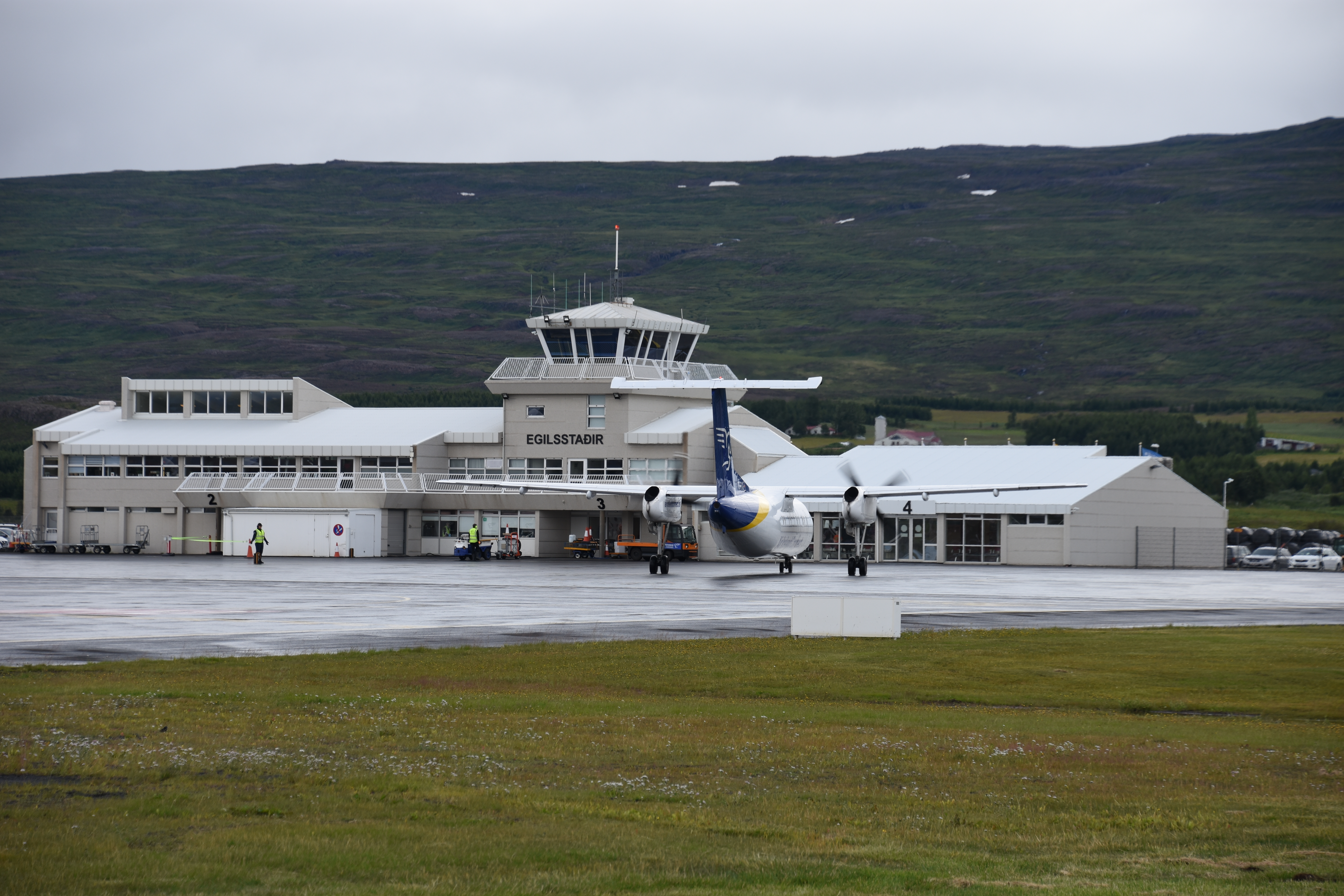
- IATA: EGS; ICAO: BIEG

Summary
- Airport type: Public
- Owner: Isavia
- Serves: Egilsstaðir and Austurland, Iceland
- Elevation AMSL: 76 ft (23 m)
- Coordinates: 65°17′00″N 14°24′05″W

Map
- Location of Airport in Iceland

Runways
Direction	Length		Surface
Direction	m	ft	Surface
03/21	2,150	7,054	Asphalt

Statistics (2019)
- Passengers: 83,954
- Sources: AIP Iceland GCM

Egilsstaðir Airport (Icelandic: Egilsstaðaflugvöllur [ˈeijɪlsˌstaːðaˌflʏɣˌvœtlʏr̥]; IATA: EGS, ICAO: BIEG) is a single-runway airport in Egilsstaðir, Iceland. The only scheduled carrier is Icelandair with flights to Reykjavík. Egilsstaðir also serves as a diversion airport for Keflavik International Airport located 415 kilometers southwest of Egilsstaðir.

It is designated as an international airport and port of entry by the Icelandic government, but as of 2024 has no scheduled international flights.

== History ==
Originally a gravel runway was made in 1951 and in 1954 it was equipped with runway lights. On the 23rd of September 1993, a new lengthened asphalt runway replaced the older gravel runway on the other side of the terminal. The air terminal was originally built in 1968, but was rebuilt and expanded during 1987 to 1999. A new arrivals hall was opened in 2007.

During the Eyjafjallajökull volcanic eruption in 2010, many flights were diverted to Egilsstaðir airport due to ATC restrictions because of volcanic ash.

The airport is mainly used for domestic flights to Reykjavík, but it also serves medical, emergency, charter and general aviation. There was previously a seasonal route to Copenhagen with Iceland Express in 2007. In late 2016, the UK tour operator Discover the World chartered flights from London-Gatwick and for a few months. The operator later preferred regular tickets to Keflavík Airport for its Iceland package holidays.

From May 2023, Egilsstaðir Airport was planned to have scheduled international flights again with Condor, a German holiday-carrier, starting flights to Frankfurt. These plans were cancelled two months before the start of the route, Condor citing weak demand.

== Airlines and destinations ==
The following airlines operate regular scheduled and charter flights at Egilsstaðir Airport:

Airlines	Destinations
Icelandair	Reykjavík

== Ground transport ==
The airport is located approximately 2 km from the town of Egilsstaðir, which is approximately a 25 minute walk or 2 minute car trip. The town of Egilsstaðir is the largest in Eastern Iceland, and the airport serves as a gateway to the region. The airport is located on the ring road (Route 1).

The towns of Seyðisfjörður, Neskaupstaður, Reyðarfjörður, Stöðvarfjörður, Eskifjörður and Fáskúrðsfjörður in the eastfjords are less than an hour away by car. The eastern highlands of Iceland as well as the towns of Bakkafjörður and Djúpivogur are also in the wider vicinity.

Taxis are available at the airport. The airport has several car rental options available, such as Höldur/Europcar, Hertz, Avis and Budget.

=== Buses ===
Strætó bs. operates two public bus routes from Egilsstaðir airport, all of which pass through the town of Egilsstaðir. One route goes to Neskaupstaður via Reyðarfjörður and Eskifjörður. The other goes to Seyðisfjörður. Each route is only operated twice per day, as of 2024.

== See also ==
- Transport in Iceland
- List of airports in Iceland
