= Rannveig Þorsteinsdóttir =

Icelandic politician

Member of the Alþingi
- In office 1949–1953

Personal details
- Born: 6 July 1904 Mjóifjörður, Iceland
- Died: 18 January 1987 (aged 82)
- Education: University of Iceland

Rannveig Þorsteinsdóttir (6 July 1904 – 18 January 1987) was an Icelandic lawyer, judge, teacher, and politician. She was a Progressive Party member of the Alþingi, the national parliament of Iceland, from 1949 to 1953. In 1959, she became the first woman to practice law before the Supreme Court of Iceland.

== Biography ==
Rannveig was born on 6 July 1904 in Mjóifjörður, Iceland. She was the daughter of Þorsteinn Sigurðsson, a fisherman, and Ragnhildur Hansdóttir, a housemaker. Rannveig graduated from Samvinnuskólinn (now Bifröst University) in 1924, and worked as a clerk for Tíminn, an Icelandic newspaper, from 1925 to 1936. During that time, she was also a part-time teacher at Samvinnuskólinn between 1926 and 1933. In 1934, she began a job as a receptionist for a tobacconist, and held the position until 1946.

Rannveig graduated from Menntaskólinn í Reykjavík, a junior college, in 1946 and enrolled at the University of Iceland, where she received a degree in law in 1949. She was elected to the Alþingi, Iceland's national parliament, that year as a member of the Progressive Party. She was one of only two women in the Alþingi, along with Kristín L. Sigurðardóttir, and served a single four-year term. During her time in the Alþingi, she was an advocate for women's rights. She established a law office in Reykjavík in 1949, and was a judge in the Reykjavík courts beginning in 1950. From May 1951 to January 1952, Rannveig was a member of the Icelandic delegation to the Parliamentary Assembly of the Council of Europe, and she was a substitute member of the assembly from 1952 to 1965.

In 1959, Rannveig obtained a license to practice before the Supreme Court of Iceland, becoming the first woman in Iceland to do so. She retired from her legal career in 1974, and died on 18 January 1987 at the age of 82.
