= Breiðdalshreppur =

- Former municipality
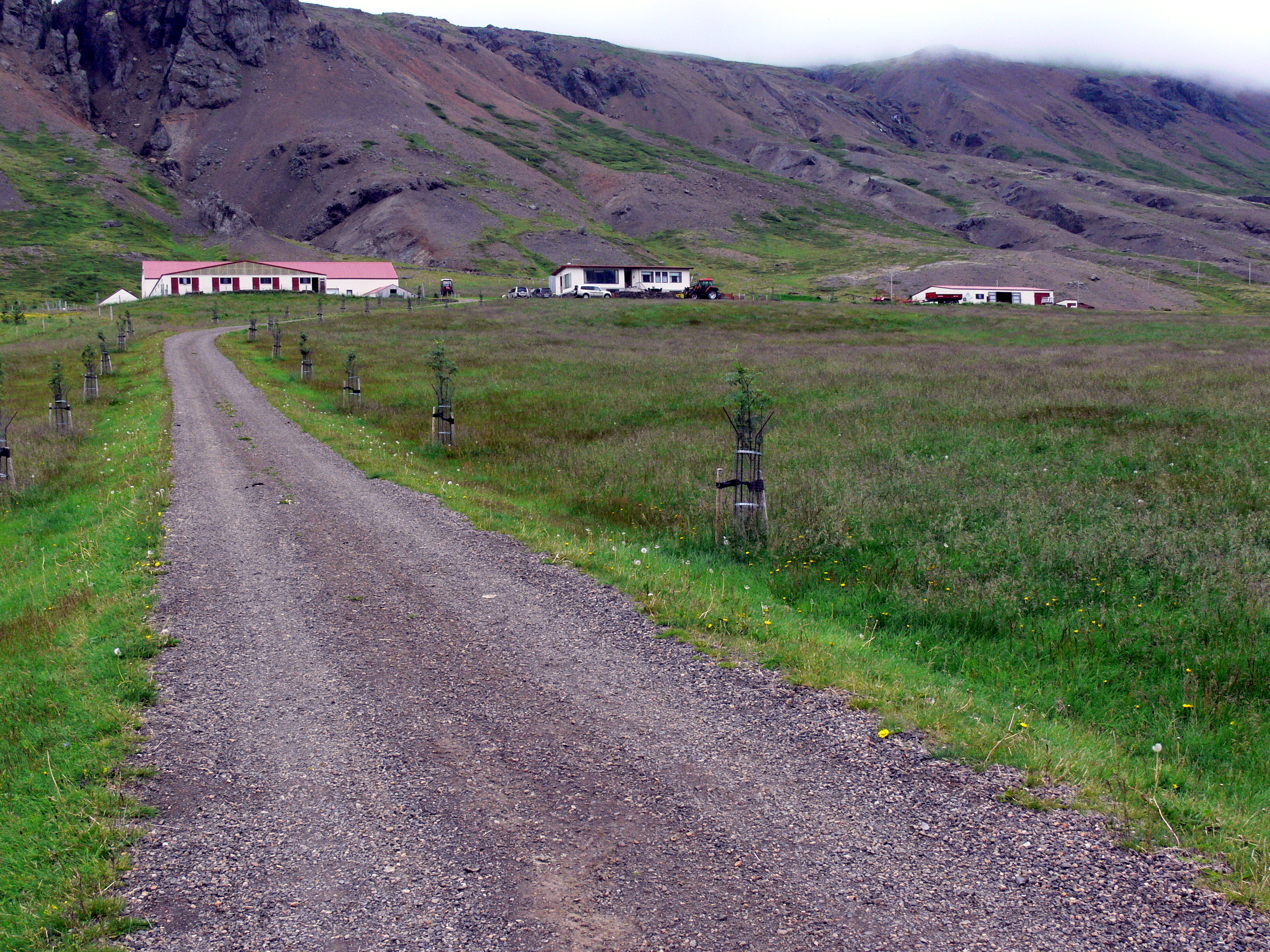
- Skyline of Breiðdalshreppur

- Location within Iceland
- Coordinates: 64°47′36″N 14°00′24″W
- Country: Iceland
- Region: Eastern Region
- Constituency: Northeast Constituency
- Municipality: Fjarðabyggð

Government
  - Manager: Sif Hauksdóttir

Area
  - Total: 452 km^{2} (175 sq mi)

Population
  - Total: 187
  - Density: 0.41/km^{2} (1.1/sq mi)
- Postal code(s): 760
- Website: breiddalur.is

Breiðdalshreppur (Icelandic pronunciation: [ˈpreiðˌtalsˌr̥ehpʏr̥]) is a former municipality in Iceland. In 2018, it merged with a larger municipality, the neighboring Fjarðabyggð.

Its service centre was Breiðdalsvík. Tourism, fishing, sheep and cow farming were the most prominent industries in the municipality.
