= Eistnaflug =

Music festival in Iceland

Eistnaflug (Icelandic pronunciation: [ˈeistnaˌflʏːɣ]) was an indoor heavy metal music festival held in Neskaupstaður, Iceland during the second weekend of July.

== Name ==
The festival's name means "testicular flight" and is a pun on the name of Neistaflug ("sparks flying"), a family-oriented festival held in Neskaupstaður during the Merchant's Weekend.

== History ==
The first festival began in August 2005 as a small, one-day party for a few Icelandic bands.

In 2017 the number of attendees was 2000–2500.

The line up usually consists of 30–40 bands, most of which are Icelandic. Some non-Icelandic bands that have performed at the festival are At The Gates (SE), Napalm Death (UK), Redfang (US), Secrets of The Moon (DE), Triptykon (CHE), The Monolith Deathcult (NL) and Cephalic Carnage (US). A few domestic bands that have often performed at the festival include Auðn, Dimma, Saktmóðigur, Kontinuum, Legend, Skálmöld, Sólstafir, The Vintage Caravan and many more.

== Location ==
Eistnaflug's home, Neskaupstaður, Iceland (population 1400), is a little town located on the Norðfjörður fjord in the municipality of Fjarðabyggð on the eastern coast of Iceland which is 700 km away from Reykjavík.

Eistnaflug's motto is Bannað að vera fáviti! ("No behaving like a jerk"). There has never been a report of a physical or sexual assault at the festival, a track record that is often compared to the much worse faring Þjóðhátíð festival.

== 2015–2019 headliners ==
=== 2015 ===
- Behemoth
- Carcass
- Enslaved
- Inquisition
- Kvelertak
- Rotting Christ

=== 2016 ===
- Amorphis
- Belphegor
- Immolation
- Marduk
- Melechesh
- Meshuggah
- Opeth

=== 2017 ===
- Akercocke
- Anaal Nathrakh
- Atari Teenage Riot
- Bloodbath
- The Dillinger Escape Plan
- Max & Igor Cavalera Return To Roots
- Neurosis
- Perturbator

=== 2018 ===
- Anathema
- Batushka
- Gus Gus
- Hatesphere
- Kreator
- Perturbator
- Tyr
- Watain

=== 2019 ===
- Hate
- Graveyard
- Primordial
