= Aðalsteinn Jónsson =

Icelandic business man

- Born: 30 January 1922; Eskifjarðarsel, Eskifjörður, Kingdom of Iceland
- Died: 30 April 2008 (aged 86); Neskaupsstaður, Iceland
- Other names: Alli ríki
- Occupation: Businessman
- Known for: CEO of Hraðfrystihús Eskifjarðar
- Spouse: Guðlaug Kr. Stefánsdóttir (m. 1948)
- Children: 4

Aðalsteinn Jónsson (30 January 1922 – 30 April 2008) was an Icelandic business man. Nicknamed Alli ríki (English: Alli the rich), he was best known as the chief executive officer of Hraðfrystihús Eskifjarðar, a major fishing and fish processing company in Iceland, for 41 years. For his achievements, he was awarded both the Knight's Cross and the Grand Knight's Cross of the Order of the Falcon.

== Early life ==
Aðalsteinn was born into poverty at the Eskifjarðarsel farm in Eskifjörður, Kingdom of Iceland, to Jón Kjartansson and Guðrún Þorkelsdóttir. He was the second youngest of six children.

== Business career ==
Aðalsteinn started working in the fishing industry at an early age and bought his first share in a boat in 1946. In 1960, he took over as CEO of the nearly bankrupt Hraðfrystihús Eskifjarðar and turned it into one of the most successful companies in Iceland. He served as CEO to 2001 and in 2004 he sold all of his stocks in the company, now known as Eskja, to his son-in-law and retired.

== Personal life ==
Aðalsteinn married Guðlaug Kristbjörg Stefánsdóttir on 26 June 1948 and with her had four children.
