= Stöðvarfjörður =

- Village
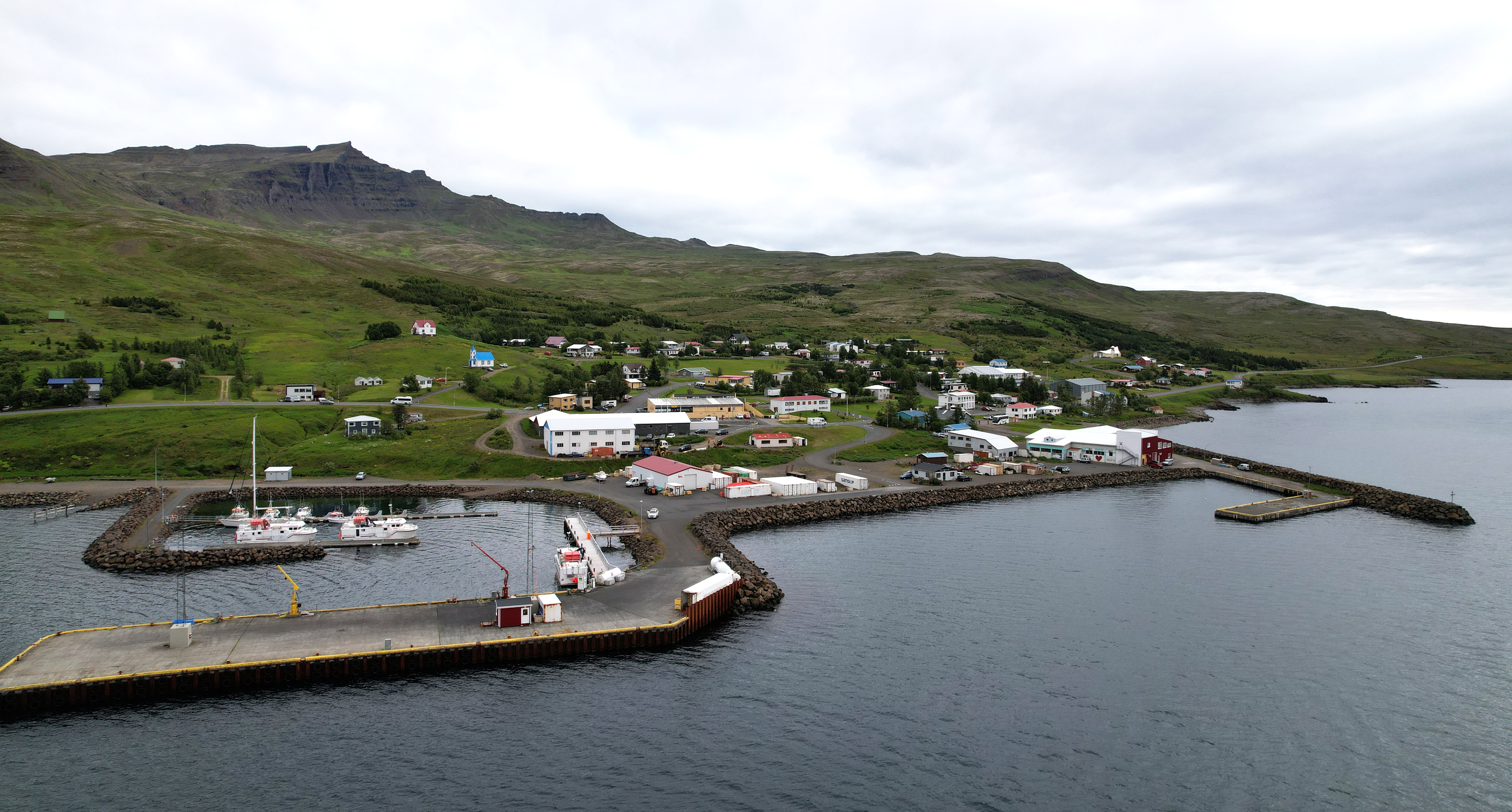
- Aerial view

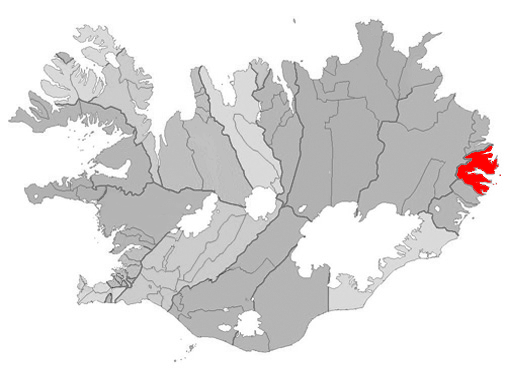
- Location of the Municipality of Fjarðabyggð

- Location in Iceland
- Coordinates: 64°50′00″N 13°52′27.6″W
- Country: Iceland
- Constituency: Northeast Constituency
- Region: Eastern Region
- Municipality: Fjarðabyggð

Population (2018)
  - Total: 184
- Time zone: UTC+0 (GMT)
- Website: Official website

Stöðvarfjörður (Icelandic pronunciation: [ˈstœðvarˌfjœrðʏr̥]; formerly Kirkjuból [ˈcʰɪr̥cʏˌpouːl̥]) is a village in east Iceland. It sits on the Northern shore of the fjord of the same name, is part of the municipality of Fjarðabyggð and has less than 200 inhabitants.

== History ==
Stöðvarfjörður is recorded as Stǫðvarfjǫrðr (Old Norse: [ˈstɔðwɑz̠ˌfjɔrðz̠]) in the Landnámabók as having been settled by Þórhaddur 'The Old' from Trondheim, Norway.

Archaeological excavations of the site at the farm Stöð [ˈstœːθ] in Stöðvarfjörður first started in 2015 under the direction of lead archaeologist Bjarni F. Einarsson.

Investigation revealed two Viking-age longhouses, the older of which was determined through C-14 dating to have been built shortly after the year 800. In addition to the longhouses, there is also evidence of farmsteads and walrus hunting.

Finds included Roman and Middle Eastern coins, rings, and a gold fragment, as well as hacksilver (pieces of cut or bent silver serving as currency). The researchers also unearthed 93 beads; one of the largest bead hordes ever found.

It is thought that the settlement was a seasonal camp for fishing and hunting, rather than a permanent settlement.

The modern village arose later on the North shore of the fjord.

== Geography ==
Stöðvarfjörður has a harbour and (since the reclassification of Route 96 (Suðurfjarðarvegur) in November 2017) lies on Route 1, at the foot of Hellufjall (859m). Most of the village lies on or close to the main street, Fjarðarbraut [ˈfjarðarˌprœyːt].

The other villages composing the municipality are: Eskifjörður (1,043 inh.), Fáskrúðsfjörður (662 inh.), Mjóifjörður (35 inh.), Neskaupstaður (1,437 inh.), and Reyðarfjörður (1,102 inh.).

The nearest weather station (with road webcams) is at Kambaskriður [ˈkʰampaˌskriːðʏr̥]. The nearest airport with scheduled flights is Egilsstaðir Airport, which is 75 km (47 mi) away and can be reached within an hour's drive. Icelandair operates two or three daily flights from Reykjavík to Egilsstaðir or vice versa and the flight is 1 hour long. There is an unscheduled and unused airport with a grass runway in Breiðdalsvík, 20 km (12 mi) from Stöðvarfjörður. Hornafjörður Airport in Höfn, which is 180 km (112 mi) away and takes two hours to reach by car. Eagle Air operates two daily flights from Reykjavík to Höfn on weekdays with the exception of Tuesday, and one flight on Sundays. Additional flights can be scheduled on specific days in the summer.

Reykjavík is 620 km (385 mi) away. It takes 7 hours and 30 minutes to drive from Reykjavík. It takes 12 hours by bus as one needs to change the buses and take the bus to Reykjavík in Höfn. The buses connecting Egilsstaðir to Höfn stop in Stöðvarfjörður alongside other villages.

=== Climate ===
The climate seen in Stöðvarfjörður and nearby areas is tundra climate (ET) because no month has a daily mean above 10 °C (50 °F). However, precipitation and winter temperatures have subpolar oceanic (Cfc) characteristics. From November to March, Stöðvarfjörður is warmer than Reykjavík, even though Reykjavík has an annual mean temperature 1 °C higher than Stöðvarfjörður.

Climate data for Kambanes (30m), 3.7 km (2.3 mi) from Stöðvarfjörður (1971–1990)
Month	Jan	Feb	Mar	Apr	May	Jun	Jul	Aug	Sep	Oct	Nov	Dec	Year
Mean daily maximum °C (°F)	2.2 (36.0)	2.7 (36.9)	2.9 (37.2)	4.5 (40.1)	6.2 (43.2)	8.5 (47.3)	10.3 (50.5)	10.4 (50.7)	8.8 (47.8)	6.3 (43.3)	3.8 (38.8)	2.8 (37.0)	5.8 (42.4)
Daily mean °C (°F)	−0.2 (31.6)	0.4 (32.7)	0.6 (33.1)	1.7 (35.1)	3.6 (38.5)	5.9 (42.6)	7.6 (45.7)	8.0 (46.4)	6.5 (43.7)	4.3 (39.7)	1.5 (34.7)	0.3 (32.5)	3.4 (38.0)
Mean daily minimum °C (°F)	−2.3 (27.9)	−1.5 (29.3)	−1.5 (29.3)	−0.5 (31.1)	1.7 (35.1)	4.0 (39.2)	5.7 (42.3)	6.2 (43.2)	4.6 (40.3)	2.5 (36.5)	−0.4 (31.3)	−1.8 (28.8)	1.4 (34.5)
Average precipitation mm (inches)	128.8 (5.07)	103.1 (4.06)	105.1 (4.14)	74.0 (2.91)	83.0 (3.27)	74.6 (2.94)	110.0 (4.33)	128.1 (5.04)	142.3 (5.60)	176.2 (6.94)	118.3 (4.66)	113.3 (4.46)	1,356.8 (53.42)
Source: Icelandic Met Office

== Economy ==
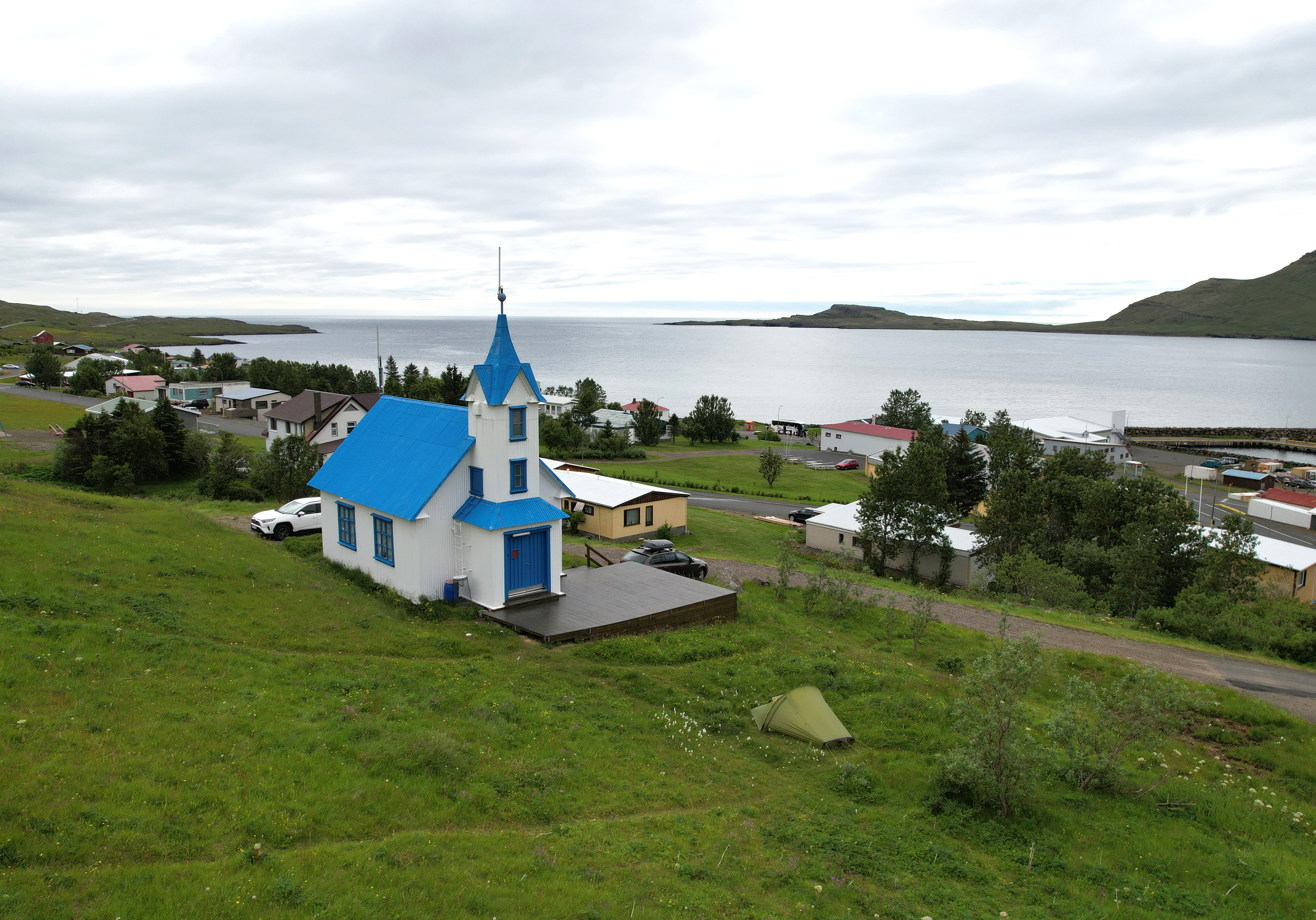
The old Stöðvarfjörður church

Employment was once predominantly found in fishing, though now it is largely textile-based. Most of the young people have left, thus the community youth hall has been closed due to disuse.

The town's formerly disused 2800m^{2} fish factory is currently being transformed into the HERE Creative Centre, which houses workshops for ceramics, wood and metal, art studio spaces, and a recording studio. The centre also hosts live music events, exhibitions, and visiting artists, providing a cultural hub for the town.

There is also an internet café / general store (Brekkan [ˈprɛhkan], formerly called Svarti Folinn), an outdoor swimming pool, self-service petrol station, ATM, bus stop and other services.

== Sights ==
Stöðvarfjarðarkirkja, a Protestant church dating from 1925, is one of the most prominent buildings. It is no longer used as a church. The building was transformed into café and offers accommodation for tourists.

== Notable residents ==
Footballer Ívar Ingimarsson is the best known former inhabitant of the town. His footballing career started at local youth club Súlan, but he is best known for his spell at Reading in England where he played 281 games, 72 of which were in the Premier League.
