= Mjóifjörður =

- Village
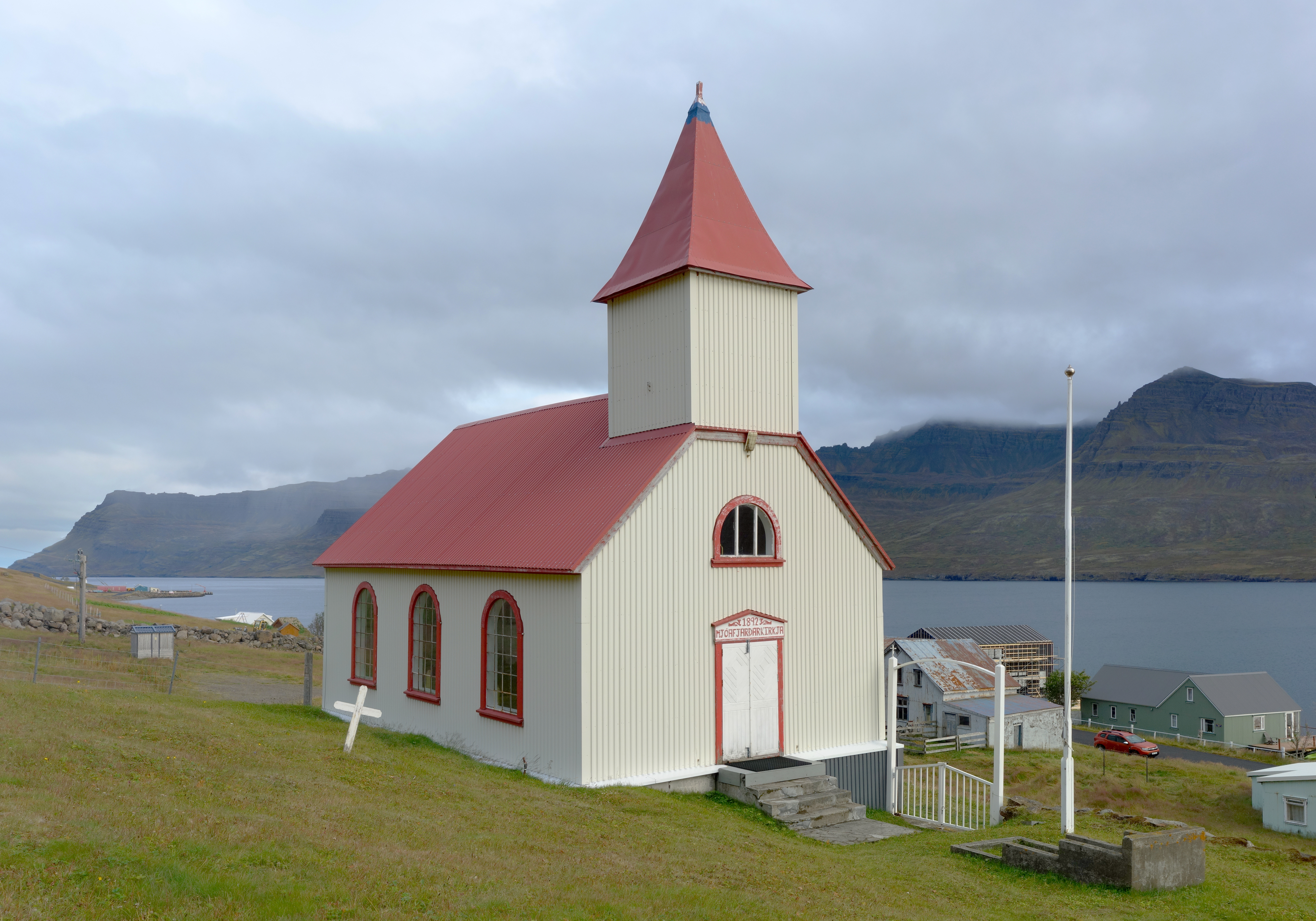
- The church Mjóafjarðarkirkja in Mjóifjörður

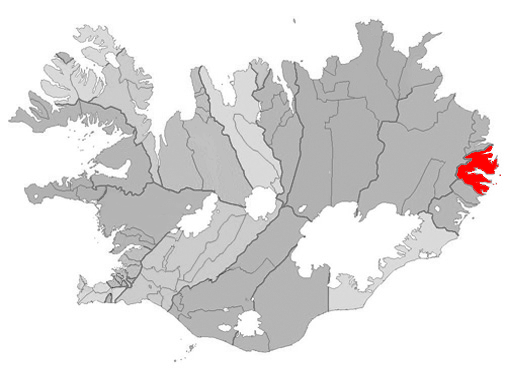
- Location of the Municipality of Fjarðabyggð

- Location in Iceland
- Coordinates: 65°11′43″N 13°47′32″W
- Country: Iceland
- Constituency: Northeast Constituency
- Region: Eastern Region
- Municipality: Fjarðabyggð
- Time zone: UTC+0 (GMT)
- Website: Official website

Mjóifjörður (Icelandic pronunciation: [ˈmjouːɪˌfjœrðʏr̥], "narrow fjord") is a village of 7 people in East Iceland, sitting on a fjord of the same name. It is part of the municipality of Fjarðabyggð.

== History ==
In the early 20th century, the village was a Norwegian whaling station. The village also hosted the Dalatangi light. It is often referred as the smallest village in the country, and one of the most diverse.

== Geography and climate ==
The other villages composing the municipality are: Eskifjörður (1,068 inh.), Fáskrúðsfjörður (611 inh.), Neskaupstaður (1,400 inh.), Reyðarfjörður (2,238 inh.) and Stöðvarfjörður (231 inh.).

There is an automatic weather station called Dalatangi near Mjóifjörður. Mjóifjörður has a typical tundra climate (Köppen: ETf), as no month has an average temperature above 10 °C (50 °F), although the coldest months all have average temperatures above 1 °C (34 °F). It is very humid throughout the year, with the average precipitation greater than 100 millimetres (3.9 in) in every month except June, and October being the wettest month with an average precipitation of 205.3 millimetres (8.08 in).

Extreme temperatures ranged from −19.2 °C (−2.6 °F) on April 1, 1968 to 26.0 °C (78.8 °F) on September 12, 1949.

Climate data for Mjóifjörður, 1991–2020 normals, extremes 1949–present
Month	Jan	Feb	Mar	Apr	May	Jun	Jul	Aug	Sep	Oct	Nov	Dec	Year
Record high °C (°F)	18.8 (65.8)	18.1 (64.6)	20.4 (68.7)	19.1 (66.4)	20.5 (68.9)	22.5 (72.5)	23.5 (74.3)	25.1 (77.2)	26.0 (78.8)	23.5 (74.3)	22.7 (72.9)	16.6 (61.9)	26.0 (78.8)
Mean daily maximum °C (°F)	4.1 (39.4)	3.8 (38.8)	3.7 (38.7)	4.5 (40.1)	6.7 (44.1)	9.1 (48.4)	11.0 (51.8)	11.4 (52.5)	10.3 (50.5)	7.2 (45.0)	5.3 (41.5)	4.1 (39.4)	6.8 (44.2)
Daily mean °C (°F)	1.7 (35.1)	1.3 (34.3)	1.2 (34.2)	2.1 (35.8)	4.2 (39.6)	6.7 (44.1)	8.7 (47.7)	9.2 (48.6)	8.0 (46.4)	5.1 (41.2)	3.1 (37.6)	1.8 (35.2)	4.4 (39.9)
Mean daily minimum °C (°F)	−0.7 (30.7)	−1.0 (30.2)	−0.9 (30.4)	0.1 (32.2)	2.3 (36.1)	4.8 (40.6)	6.9 (44.4)	7.5 (45.5)	6.2 (43.2)	3.2 (37.8)	1.0 (33.8)	−0.5 (31.1)	2.4 (36.3)
Record low °C (°F)	−16.5 (2.3)	−16.9 (1.6)	−17.1 (1.2)	−19.2 (−2.6)	−7.6 (18.3)	−1.9 (28.6)	1.0 (33.8)	1.4 (34.5)	−1.7 (28.9)	−8.6 (16.5)	−9.7 (14.5)	−15.4 (4.3)	−19.2 (−2.6)
Average precipitation mm (inches)	152.1 (5.99)	116.2 (4.57)	115.5 (4.55)	111.5 (4.39)	104.9 (4.13)	91.5 (3.60)	123.3 (4.85)	131.3 (5.17)	167.5 (6.59)	205.3 (8.08)	179.3 (7.06)	157.8 (6.21)	1,656.2 (65.20)
Average precipitation days (≥ 1.0 mm)	16.4	13.8	13.6	12.6	11.0	8.9	10.7	10.8	13.5	16.6	16.7	16.7	161.3
Average snowy days (≥ 0 cm)	13.5	14.1	15.8	10.2	2.5	0.1	0.0	0.0	0.0	2.1	8.3	13.9	80.5
Average dew point °C (°F)	−2.8 (27.0)	−3.3 (26.1)	−3.3 (26.1)	−1.7 (28.9)	0.9 (33.6)	4.0 (39.2)	6.4 (43.5)	6.6 (43.9)	4.5 (40.1)	1.4 (34.5)	−1.2 (29.8)	−2.7 (27.1)	0.7 (33.3)
Source 1: NOAA
Source 2: Iceland Met Office (extremes)

== Sights ==
Mjóafjarðarkirkja, a wooden church in the hamlet Brekka, was built in 1892 with about 100 seats and a ridge turret. The retable dates from 1871. The church was renovated in 1992. The church of Mjóifjörður was already mentioned in a document dating from 1092.

== Infrastructure ==
Mjóifjörður has a primary school, a camping site and a hotel with a café.
