= Fáskrúðsfjörður =

- Town
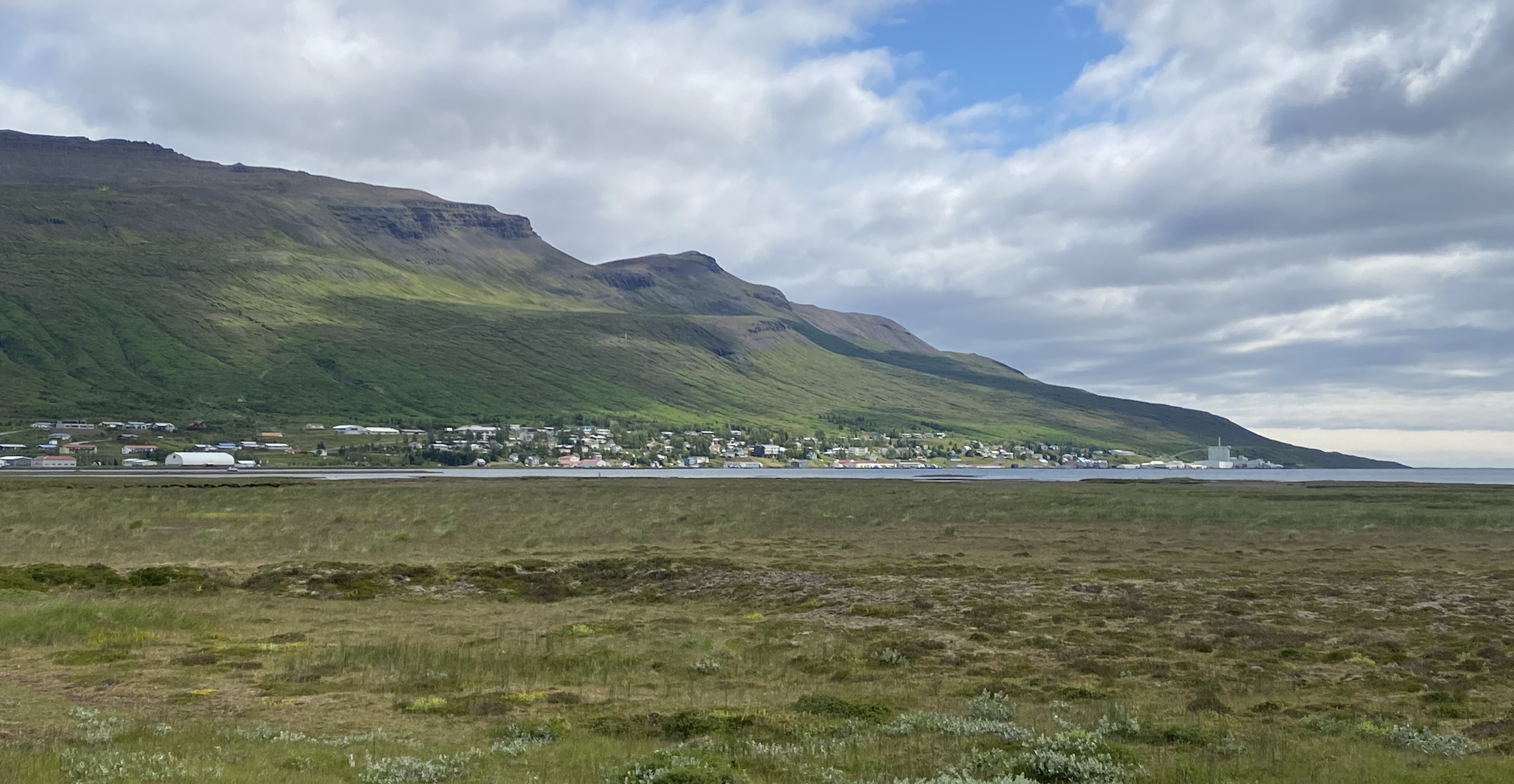
- Fáskrúðsfjörður

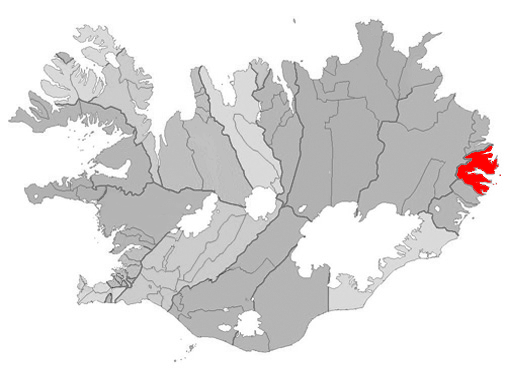
- Location of the Municipality of Fjarðabyggð

- Location in Iceland
- Coordinates: 64°55′45.83″N 14°00′37.6″W
- Country: Iceland
- Constituency: Northeast Constituency
- Region: Eastern Region
- Municipality: Fjarðabyggð

Population (2024)
  - Total: 735
- Time zone: UTC+0 (GMT)
- Website: Official website

Fáskrúðsfjörður (Icelandic pronunciation: [ˈfauːˌskruðsˌfjœrðʏr̥]; previously named also Búðir [ˈpuːðɪr̥]) is a village (þorp) in eastern Iceland.

It has a population of 735 (as of 2024) and constitutes one of the villages composing the municipality of Fjarðabyggð.

== Geography ==
Fáskrúðsfjörður, located on the same-named fjord, lies between Reyðarfjörður and Stöðvarfjörður. It is one of the easternmost settlements of Iceland.

The other neighbouring villages which compose the municipality of Fjarðabyggð are: Eskifjörður (1,043 inh.), Mjóifjörður (35 inh.), Neskaupstaður (1,437 inh.), Reyðarfjörður (1,102 inh.) and Stöðvarfjörður (203 inh.).

== History and culture ==
Fáskrúðsfjörður was home to a hospital founded to serve French fishermen working here until 1935. The former hospital building dating from 1903 has now been restored as a hotel. Even nowadays there are bilingual signs in town indicating the street names in Icelandic and in French. The French cemetery with 49 graves of fishermen from France and Belgium is another tourist attraction. The cross was erected in 2009.

The village is now a centre for visitors viewing the Northern Lights.

== Attractions ==
There are tour operators offering trips by boat to the small uninhabited island Skrúður which is famous for its large variety of sea birds, especially for its puffins. In the east of Fáskrúðsfjörður, on the farm Kolfreyjustaður a church (Kolfreyjustaðakirkja) was built of driftwood in 1878, which is famous for its wall paintings dating from 1957 and for its retable painted by the Danish artist Niels Anker Lund (1840–1922). Vattarnesviti is an orange lighthouse on the peninsula of Vattarnes in the northeast of Fáskrúðsfjörður built in 1957.

== Twin towns ==
- Gravelines (France)

== Photogallery ==
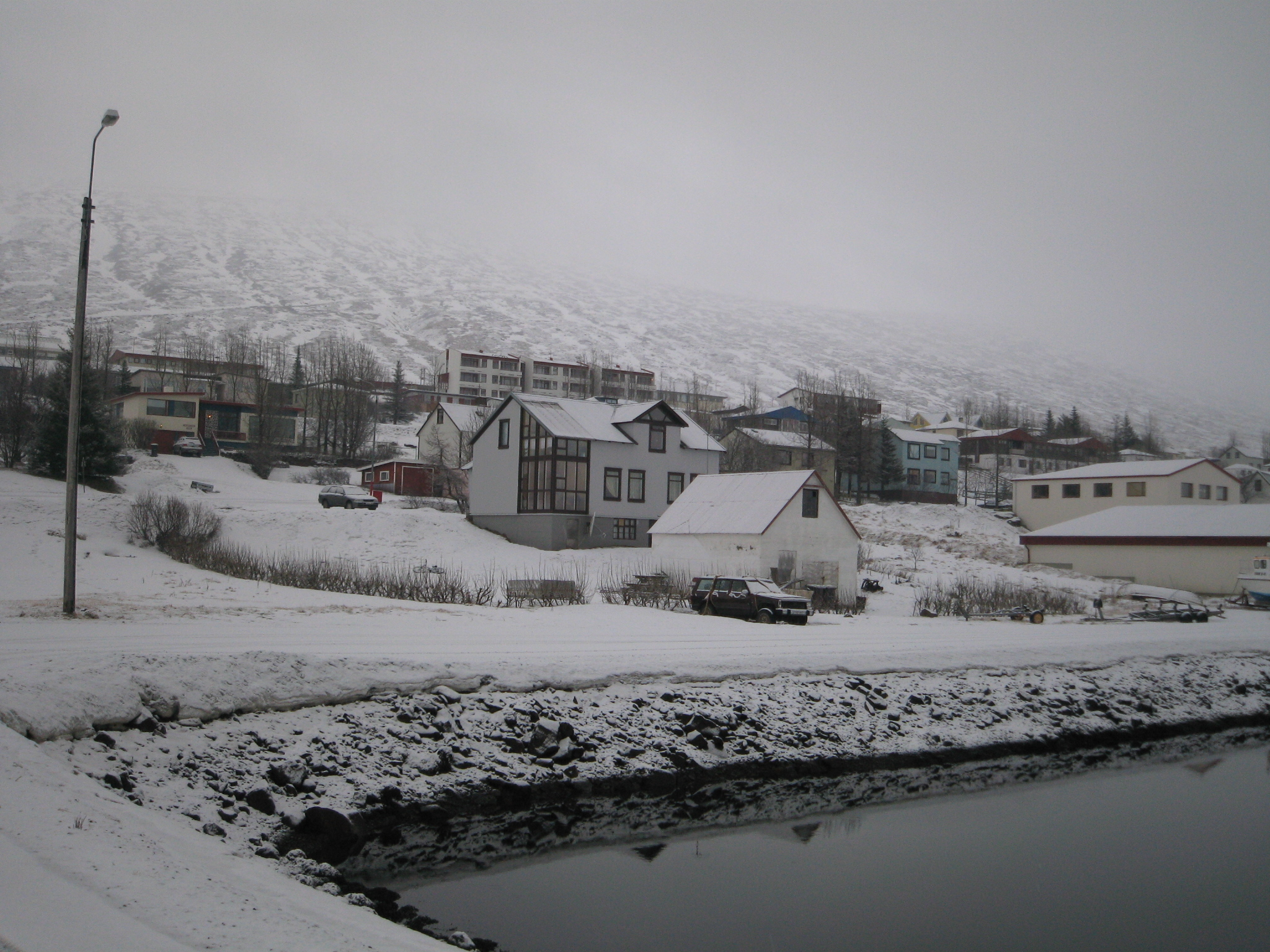
Winter in Fáskrúðsfjörður

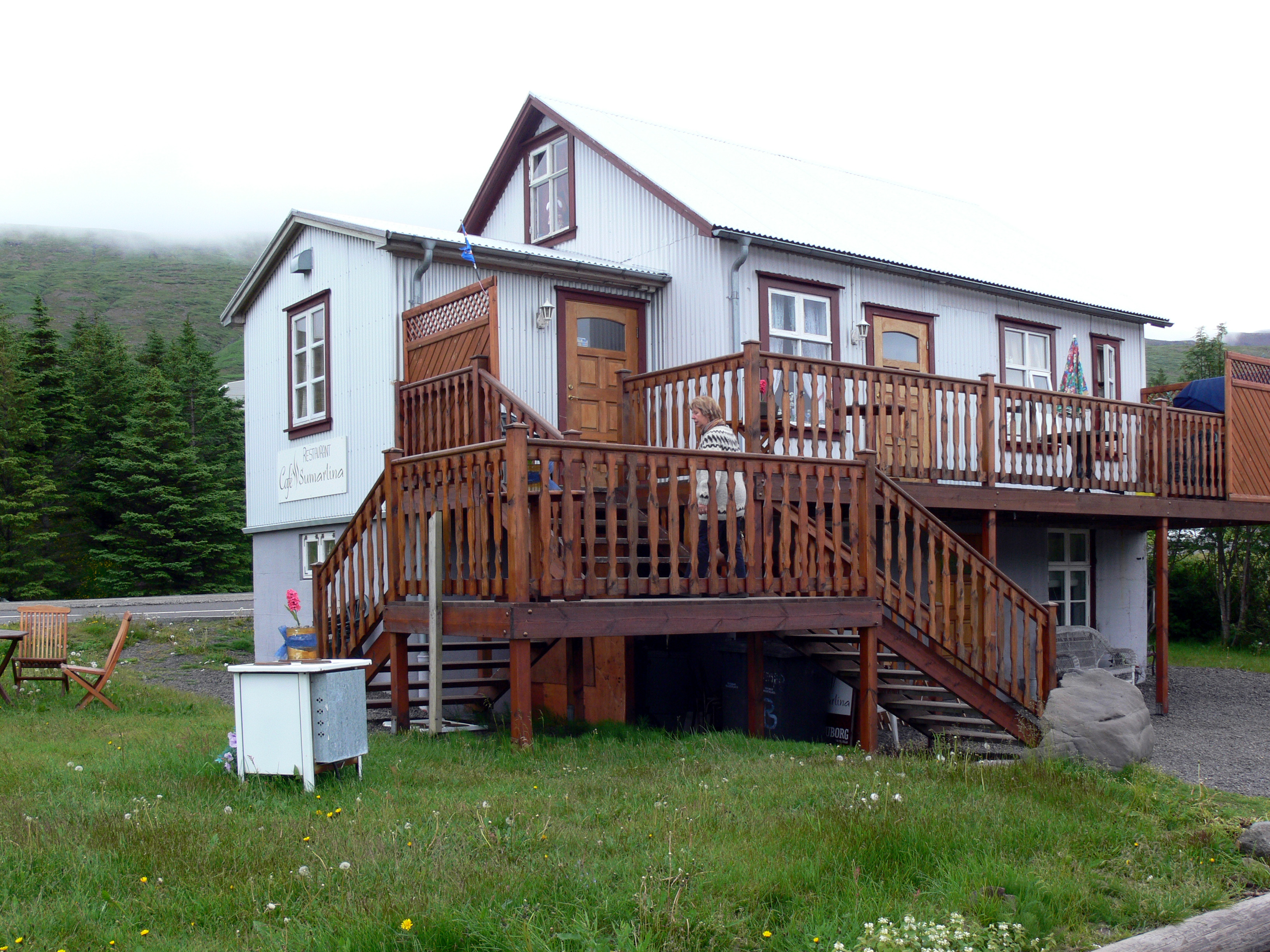
Restaurant Café Sumarlína

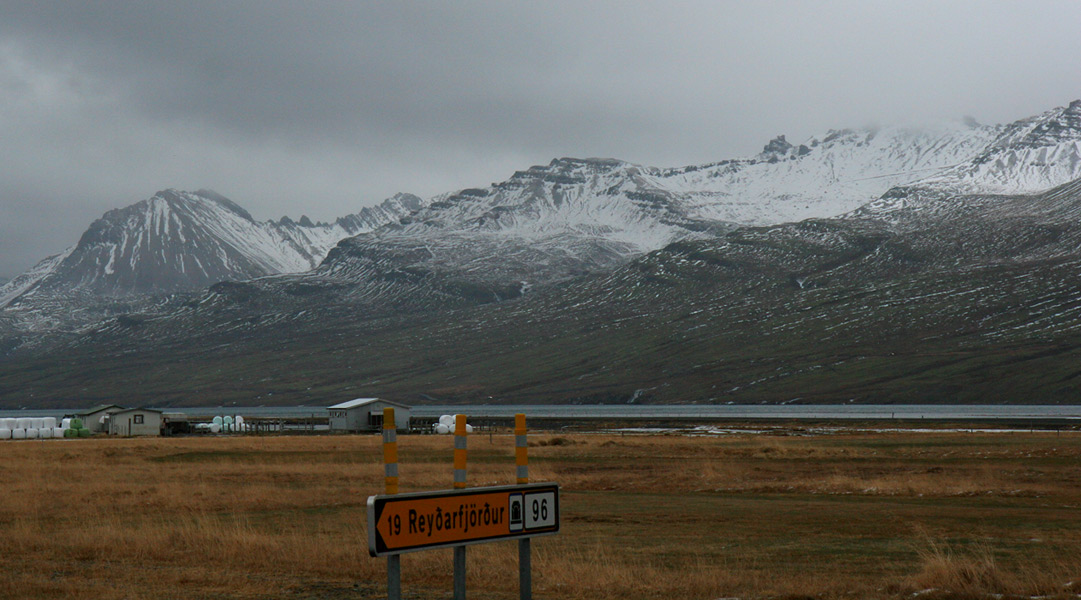
Scenic view near Fáskrúðsfjörður

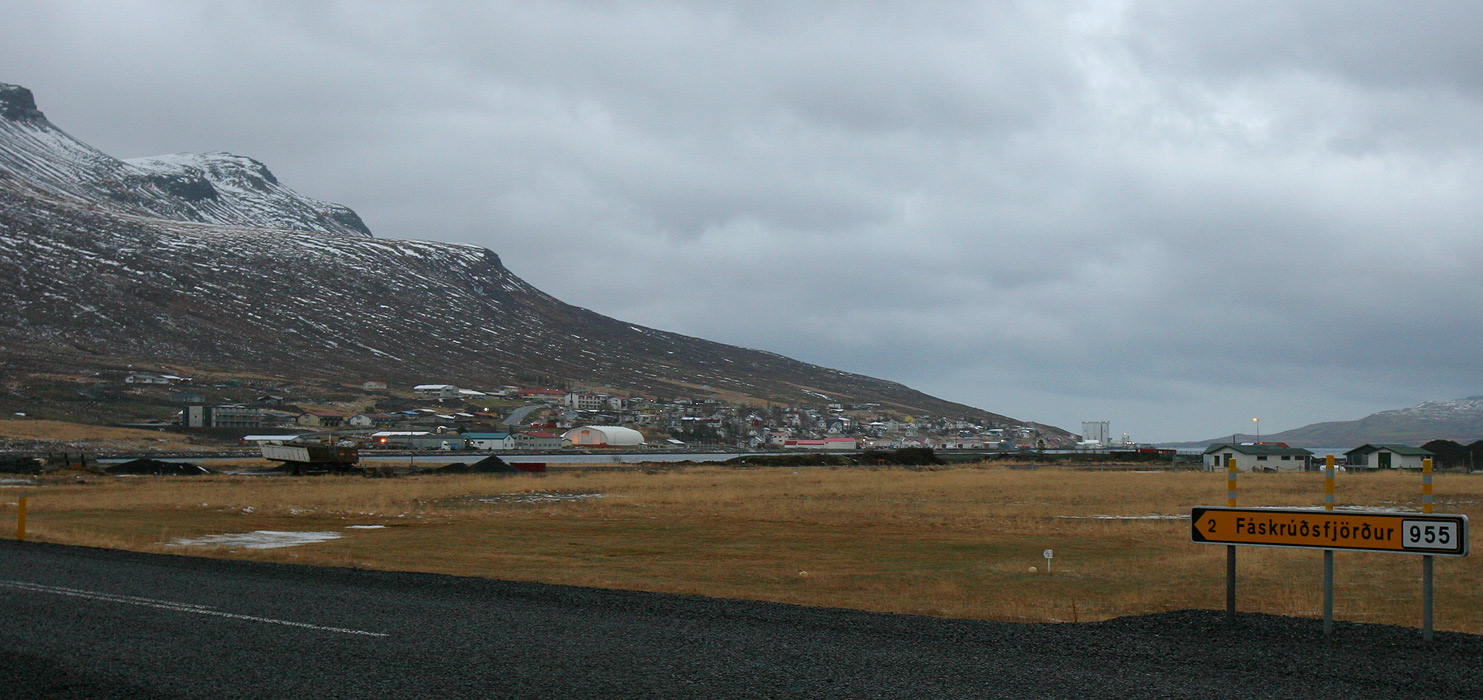
East to the village of Fáskrúðsfjörður

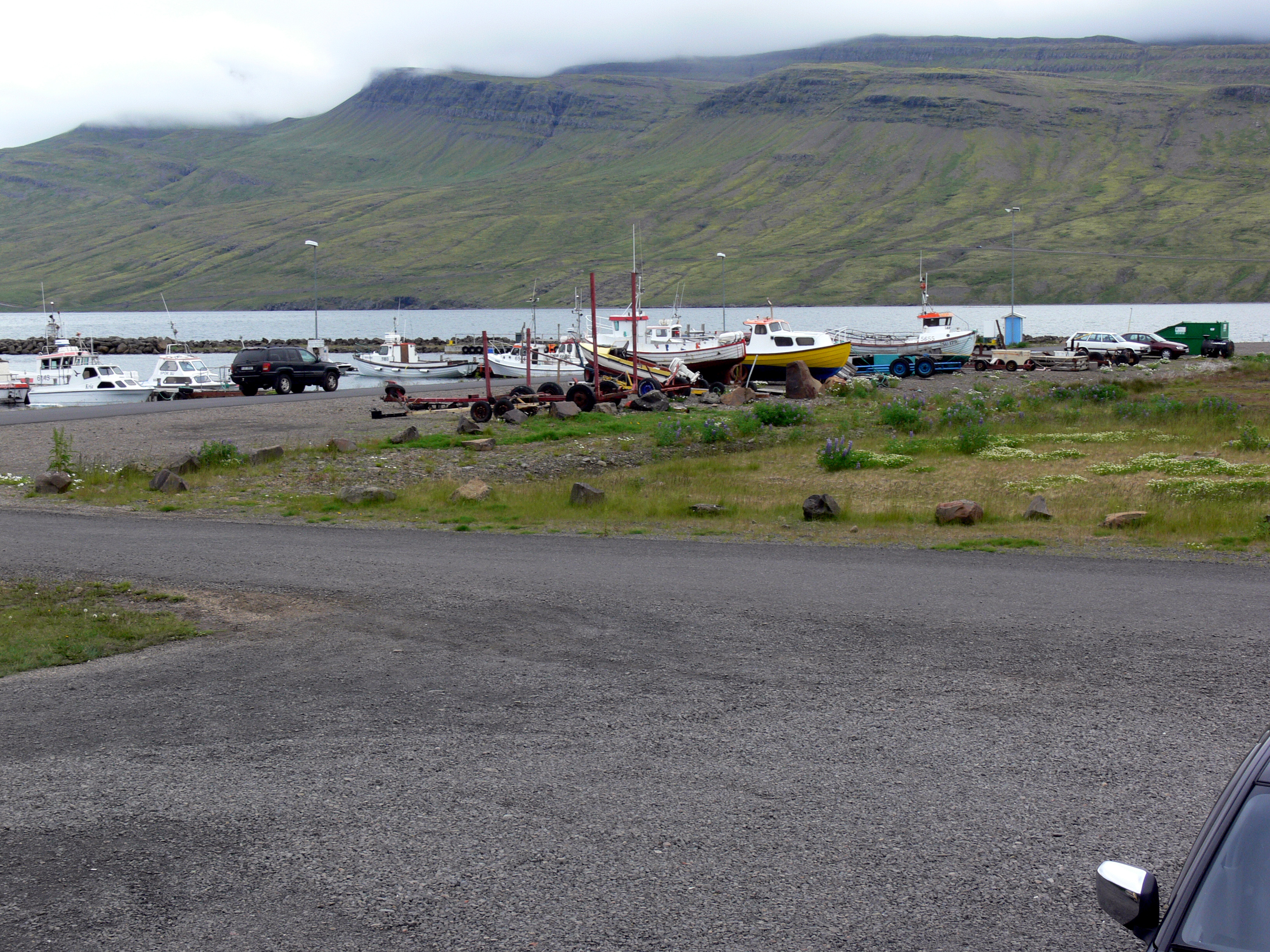
View of the port

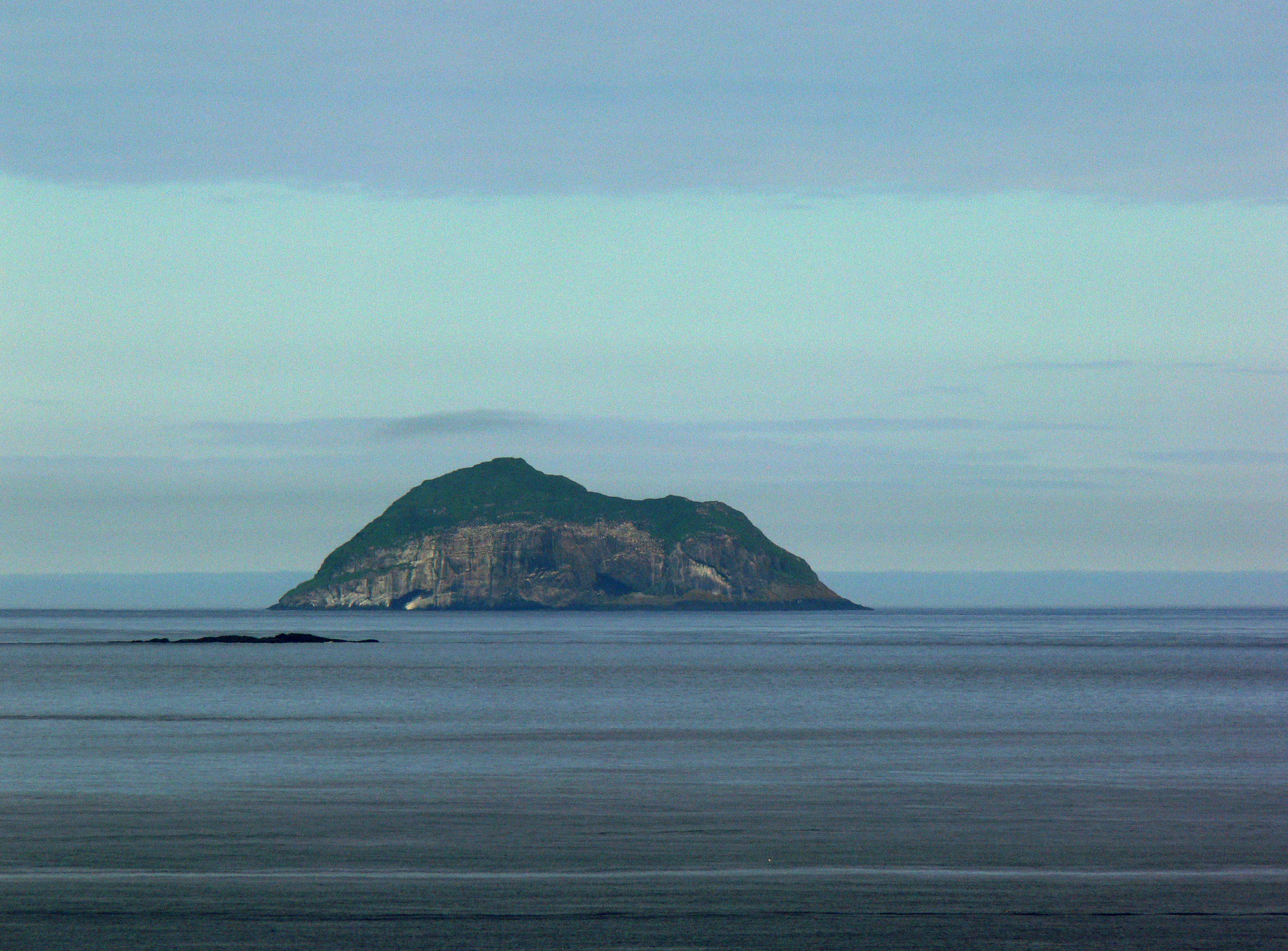
Skrúður, a rocky island close to Fáskrúðsfjörður

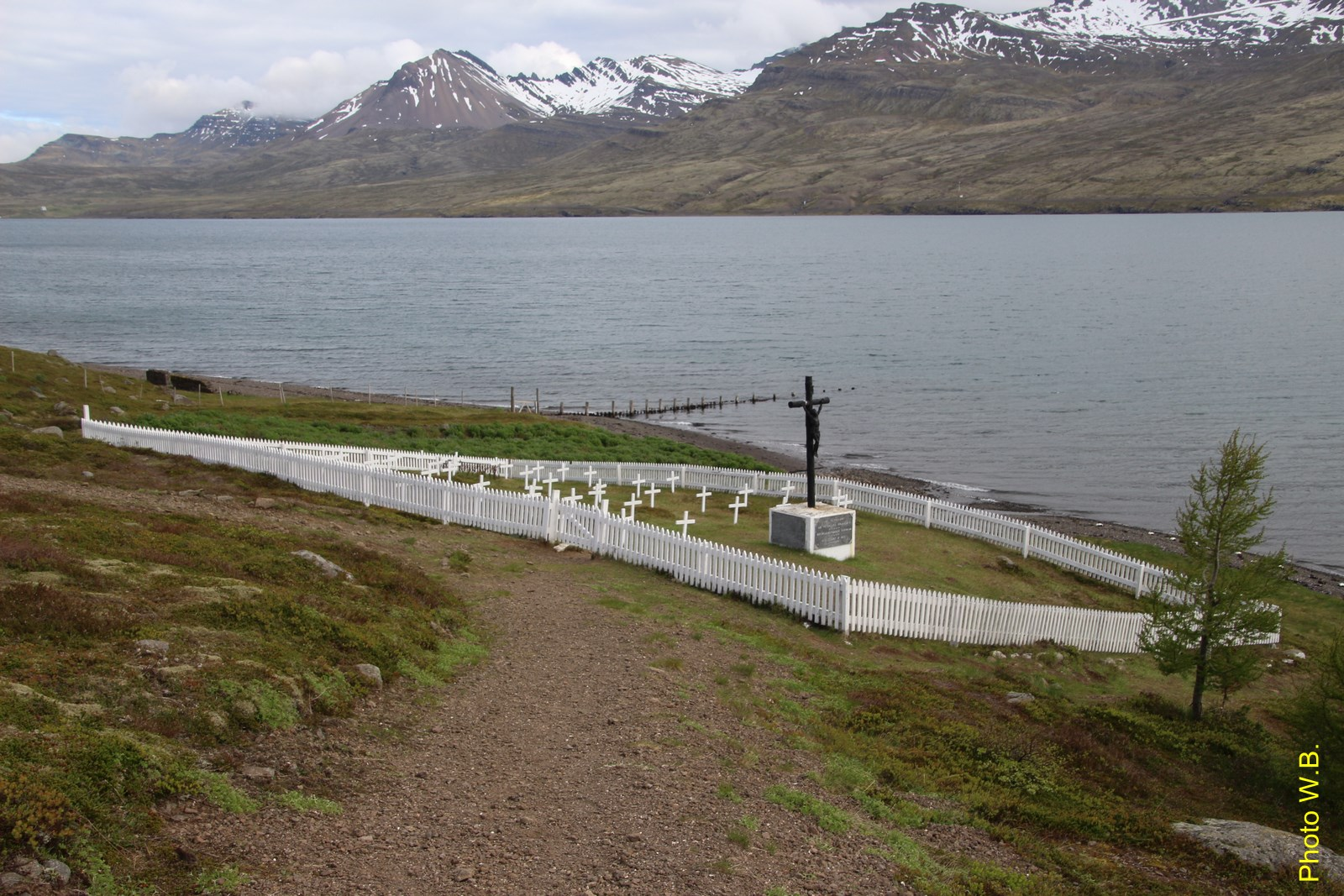
French cemetery

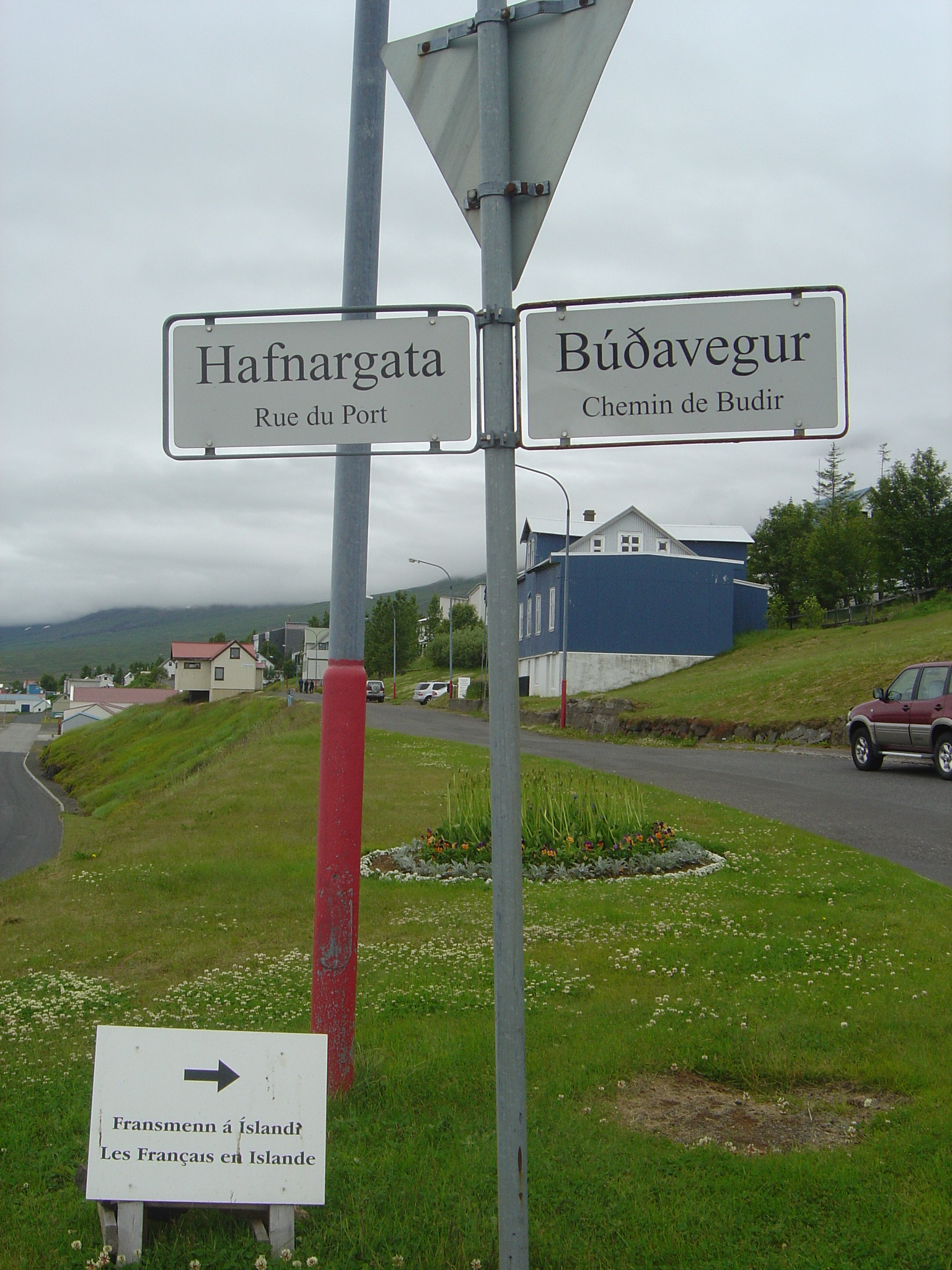
Street names in Icelandic and French
