= Fjarðabyggð =

- Municipality
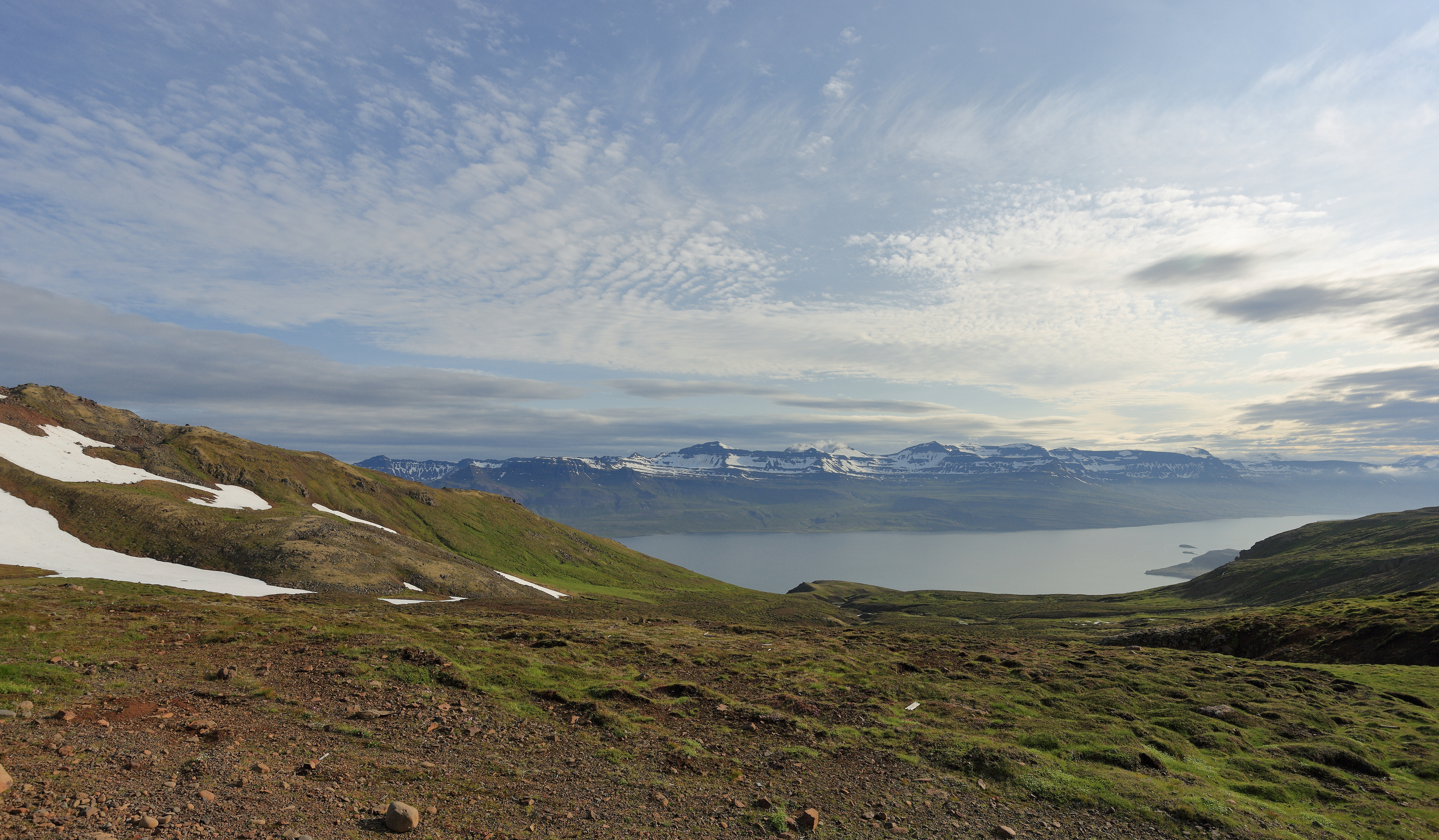
- Skyline of Fjarðabyggð

- Location of Fjarðabyggð

- Location within Iceland
- Coordinates: 65°2′0″N 14°13′0″W
- Country: Iceland
- Region: Eastern Region
- Constituency: Northeast Constituency

Government
  - Mayor: Jóna Árný Þórðardottir

Area
  - Total: 1,164 km^{2} (449 sq mi)

Population (2026)
  - Total: 5,228
  - Density: 4.49/km^{2} (11.6/sq mi)
- Postal code(s): 715, 730, 735, 740, 750, 755
- Municipal number: 7300
- Website: fjardabyggd.is

Fjarðabyggð (Icelandic pronunciation: [ˈfjarðaˌpɪɣθ]) is a municipality located in eastern Iceland, in the Eastern Region.

== History ==
The municipality was formed in 1998 with the union of the former municipalities of Eskifjörður, Neskaupstaður and Reyðarfjörður. Austurbyggð, Fáskrúðsfjarðarhreppur and Mjóafjarðarhreppur were merged into Fjarðabyggð in 2006, and Breiðdalshreppur merged in 2018.

== Geography ==
The municipality is composed by the following villages:

Rank	Village	2011 Population
1.	Neskaupstaður	1,437
2.	Reyðarfjörður	1,102
3.	Eskifjörður	1,043
4.	Fáskrúðsfjörður	662
5.	Stöðvarfjörður	203
6.	Mjóifjörður	35

== Twin towns – sister cities ==
Fjarðabyggð is twinned with:

- Esbjerg, Denmark
- Eskilstuna, Sweden
- Gravelines, France
- Jyväskylä, Finland
- Qeqqata, Greenland
- Stavanger, Norway
- Vágar, Faroe Islands
