= Reyðarfjörður =

- Town
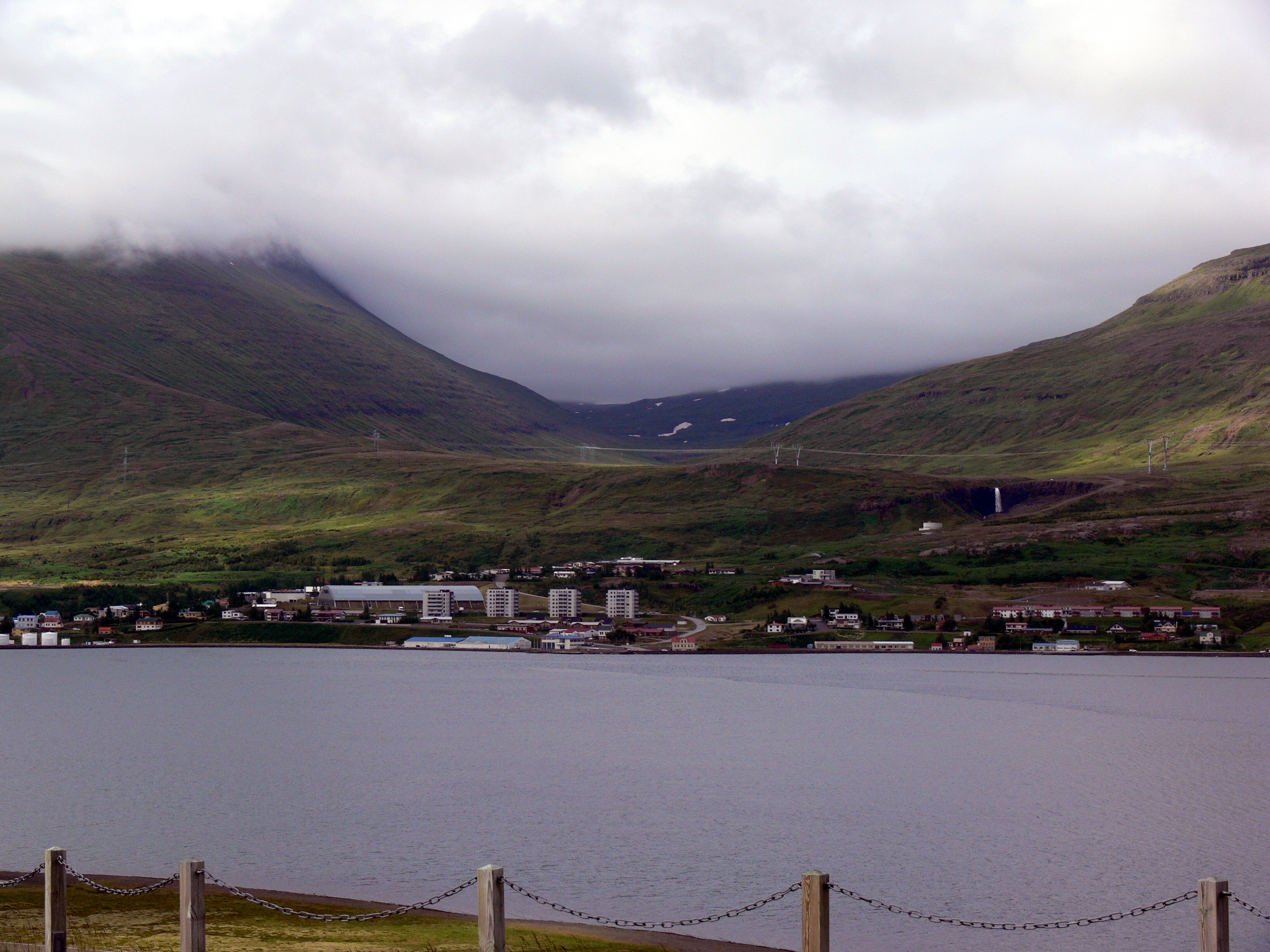
- The town of Reyðarfjörður

- Location of the Municipality of Fjarðabyggð

- Location in Iceland
- Coordinates: 65°02′N 14°13′W
- Country: Iceland
- Constituency: Northeast Constituency
- Region: Eastern Region
- Municipality: Fjarðabyggð

Population (2024)
  - Total: 1,368
- Time zone: UTC+0 (GMT)
- Website: Official website

Reyðarfjörður (Icelandic pronunciation: [ˈreiːðarˌfjœrðʏr̥]) is a town in eastern Iceland. It has a population of 1,368 (2024) and is one of the most populated villages that constitute the municipality of Fjarðabyggð.

== History ==
The town is at the bottom of the eponymous fjord, the largest on the east coast of Iceland. Like most other towns in the East Fjords, it is surrounded by mountains, of which the highest is about 972 metres (3,189 ft). Although the climate is particularly rainy and foggy, on clear summer days it often has the highest temperatures in Iceland.

From the early 20th century, Reyðarfjörður was a trading port, as well as a fishing port. Due to its strategic location and good harbour conditions, it became the second-largest of the Allied bases in Iceland during World War II. There is a World War II museum located at the old camp above the town.

Reyðarfjörður joined Eskifjörður and Neskaupstaður in 1998 to form the new municipality of Fjarðabyggð ("fjords-settlement").

== Geography ==
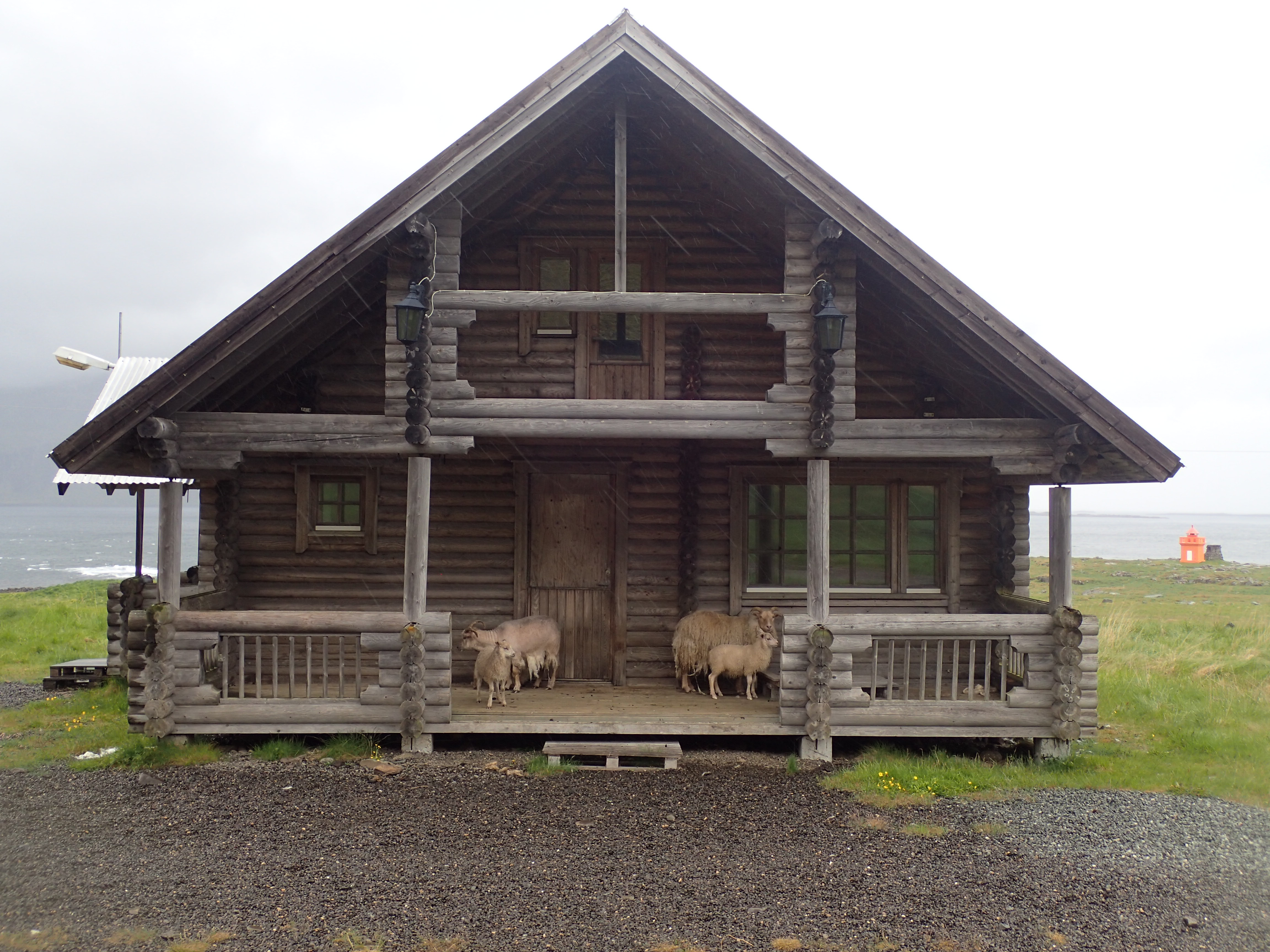
A house in the fjord.

The other villages composing the municipality are: Eskifjörður, Fáskrúðsfjörður, Mjóifjörður, Neskaupstaður (Note: Located in the Norðfjörður) and Stöðvarfjörður.

== Fjarðaál aluminium smelter ==
A quiet fishing town since the war, Reyðarfjörður (and neighbouring communities) saw a revival in the early 2000s when Alcoa decided to build the Alcoa Fjarðaál [ˈfjarðaˌauːl̥] aluminium smelter there. It was built between 2004 and 2007 by the contractor Bechtel, requiring thousands of workers from various countries, most notably from Poland. At one point, the town had the highest concentration of foreign residents of any community in the country, and the number of workers reached as high as 2,800. By 2008, the construction workers had left.

The Fjarðaál aluminium smelter reached full production capacity in April 2008. The facility contains a smelter, cast house, rod production and deep-water port. The smelter employs 450 people and produces 940 tons of aluminium a day, with capacity of 346,000 metric tons of aluminium per year. Fjarðaál means "Fjords' aluminium" in Icelandic. For the smelter, the new Kárahnjúkar Hydropower Plant in the neighboring municipality of Fljótsdalshérað was built.

== Catholic church ==
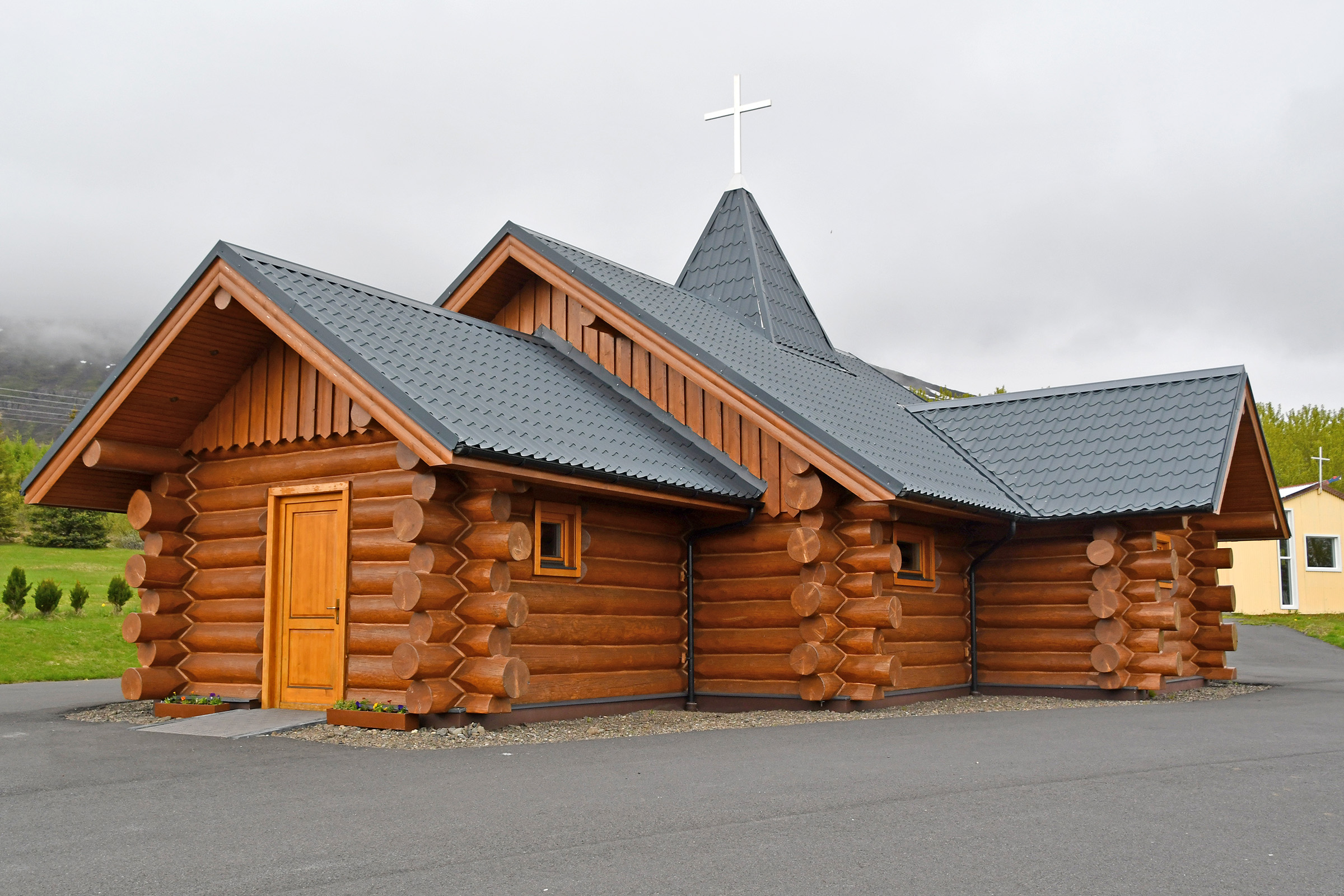
Catholic Church, 2017

On 17 June 2017, a new Catholic Church (St. Thorlak Church) was consecrated in the town in a ceremony led by Bishop David Tencer of Reykjavik. Tencer is a Capuchin Franciscan and a native of Slovakia and the church building was a gift from the Slovak Catholic Church. The church was built from wood in Slovakia, disassembled and shipped to Reydarfjordur, where it was re-assembled. Robert Fico, the Prime Minister of Slovakia, attended the consecration.

== In popular culture ==
Reyðarfjörður was chosen as the location for the Sky Atlantic series Fortitude. Filming took place during early 2014 for the first series and in 2016 for the second series.
