= Eskifjörður =

- Town
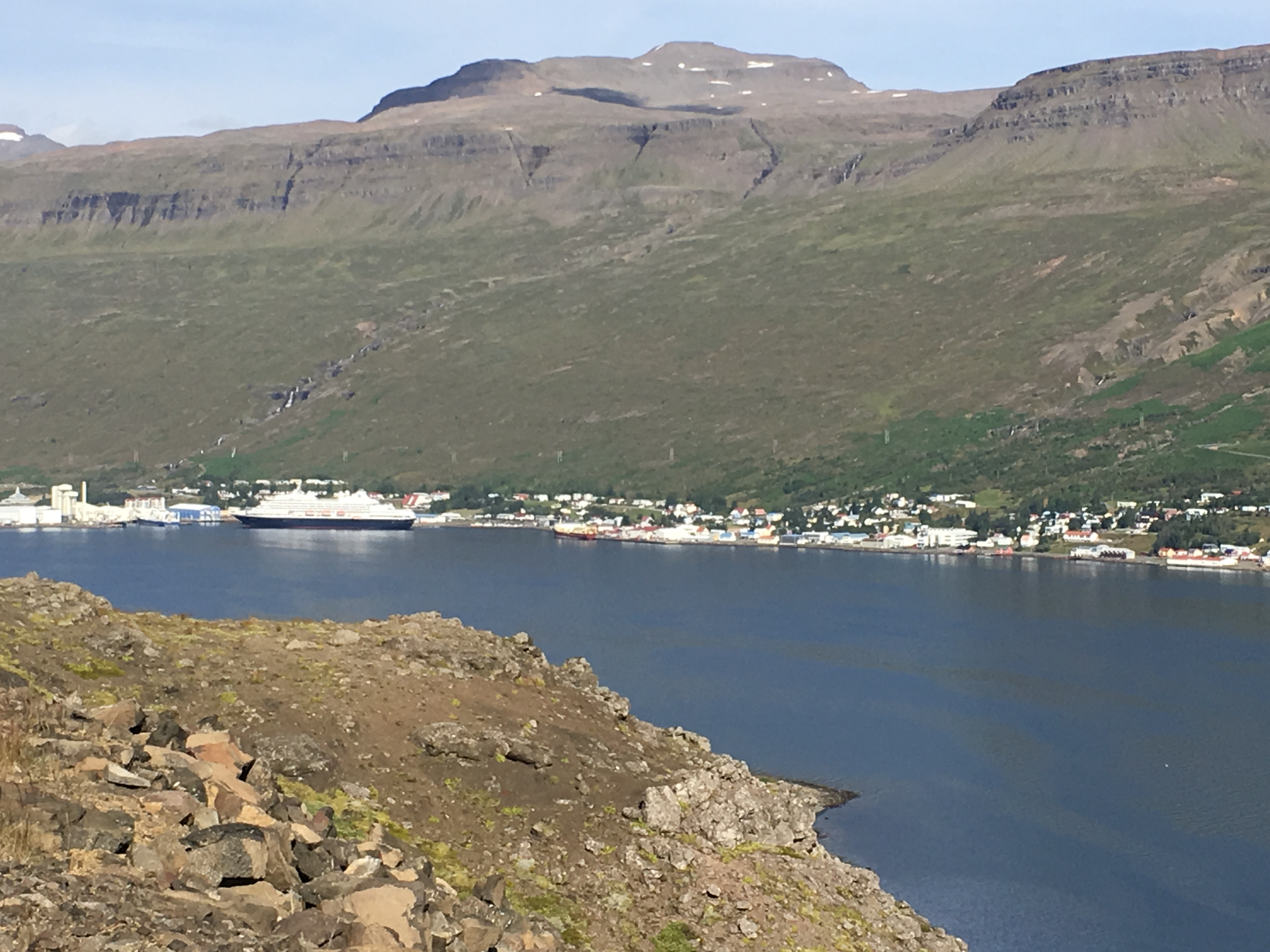
- Eskifjörður with cruise ship Prinsendam at its wharf, 2017

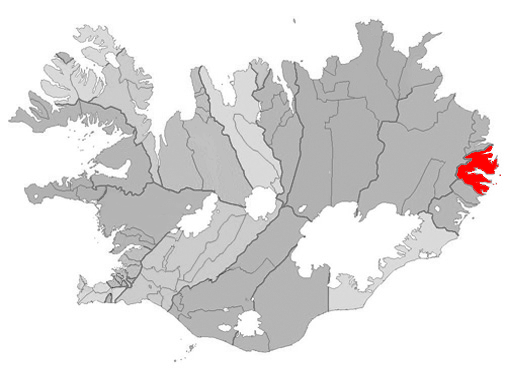
- Location of the Municipality of Fjarðabyggð

- Location in Iceland
- Coordinates: 65°04′17.48″N 14°00′55.4″W
- Country: Iceland
- Constituency: Northeast Constituency
- Region: Eastern Region
- Municipality: Fjarðabyggð

Population (2011)
  - Total: 1,043
- Time zone: UTC+0 (GMT)
- Website: Official website

Eskifjörður (in original spelling; Icelandic pronunciation: [ˈɛscɪˌfjœrðʏr̥]), or Eskifjördur, is a town and port in eastern Iceland with a large fishing industry. With a population of 1,043 it is one of the most populous towns in the municipality of Fjarðabyggð.

== History ==
Eskifjörður had 302 inhabitants in 1901, 425 in 1910, 619 in 1920, 758 in 1930, 671 in 1940, 673 in 1950, 1,741 in 1960, 936 in 1970 and 1,084 in 1981. It obtained the rights and privileges of an official trading place (verslunastaður) as early as 1786 and was awarded municipal status (kaupstaðarréttindi) on 10 April 1974. It developed into a booming community after Örum & Wulff, a powerful Danish trading company, had opened a trading post in 1798. In 1802 Kjartan Þórlaksson, the first Icelandic merchant who was not a Dane, settled down in Eskifjörður and started a successful business.

Eskifjörður joined Neskaupstaður and Reyðarfjörður in 1998 to form the new municipality of Fjarðabyggð ("fjords-settlement").

== Geography ==
The other villages composing the municipality are: Fáskrúðsfjörður (662 inh.), Mjóifjörður (35 inh.), Neskaupstaður (1,437 inh.), Reyðarfjörður (1,102 inh.) and Stöðvarfjörður (203 inh.).

== Main sights ==
A sculpture by Ragnar Kjartansson is located along the main road in Eskifjördur, commemorating the mariners who drowned at sea.

The Maritime Museum of East Iceland is located in a commercial building, "Gamla búđ", which was built in 1816. The museum displays artifacts that illustrate the fishing and seafaring history of East Iceland. It also displays various reminders of local trade, industry and medicine from times past. The First Free Church in Iceland was built in Eskifjörður in 1884.

Eskifjörður is also home to a privately owned stone collection, begun in 1976 by married couple Sören Sörenssen and Sigurborg Einarsdóttir. It includes over 1,000 cut and polished stones, mostly collected in East Iceland. Visits to the collection are by arrangement.

== Notable people ==
- Aðalsteinn Jónsson, business man and former CEO of Hraðfrystihús Eskifjarðar
- Einar Bragi, poet
- Eggert Jónsson, footballer
- Þórólfur Guðnason, Chief Epidemiologist of the Icelandic Directorate of Health
