= Árbæjarhverfi í Ölfusi =

Coordinates: 63°56′47″N 21°1′35″W

- Village
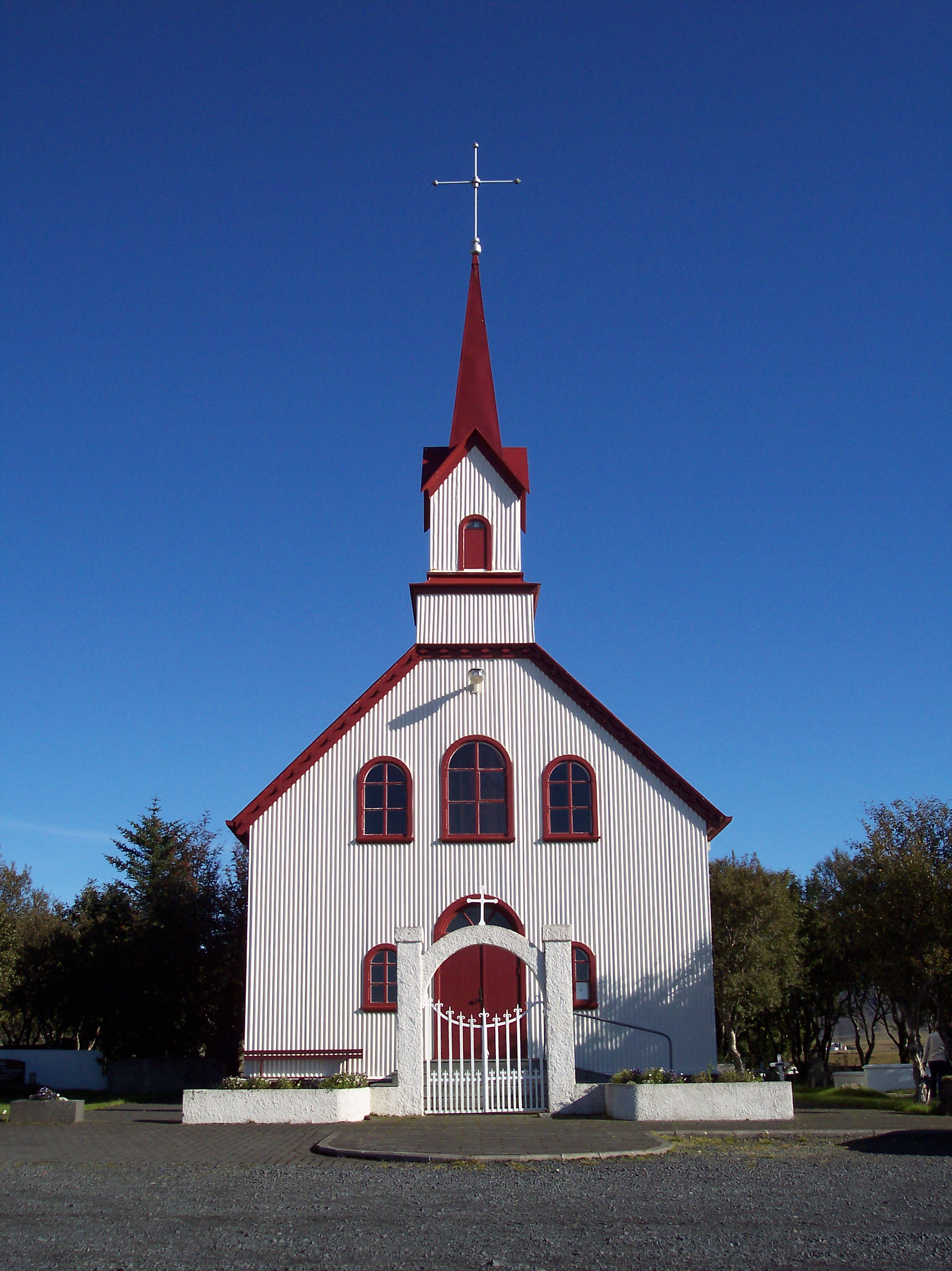

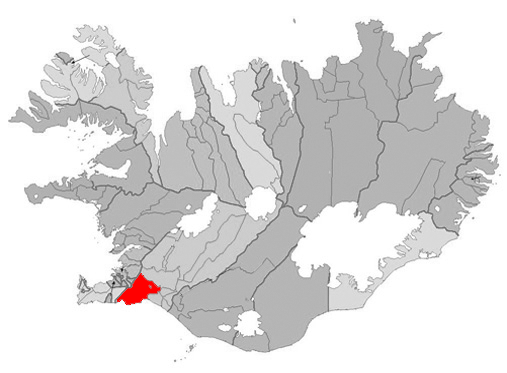
- Country: Iceland
- County: Árnessýslu

Area
  - Total: 725.2 ha (1,792 acres)

Population (2016)
  - Total: 81
  - Density: 11/km^{2} (29/sq mi)
- Settlement Code: 8717

Árbæjarhverfi í Ölfusi (Icelandic pronunciation: [ˈaurˌpaiːjarˌkʰvɛrvɪ i ˈœlvʏsɪ, -xʷɛrvɪ]) is a municipality in Árnessýslu, Iceland, with a population of 81 people in 2016. It is the smallest municipality of Iceland in terms of the number of inhabitants. There is now only one dairy farm operating in Ölfusi (Hvammur), but they were numerous in the past. The municipality is composed of the residential areas of Hveragerði, Þorlakshofn Árbæjarhverfi considered to town hall that Hveragerði. In 2011, the Ölfus assigned a specific postal code, 816, to distinguish it from other municipality of the South.
