= Neskaupstaður =

- Town
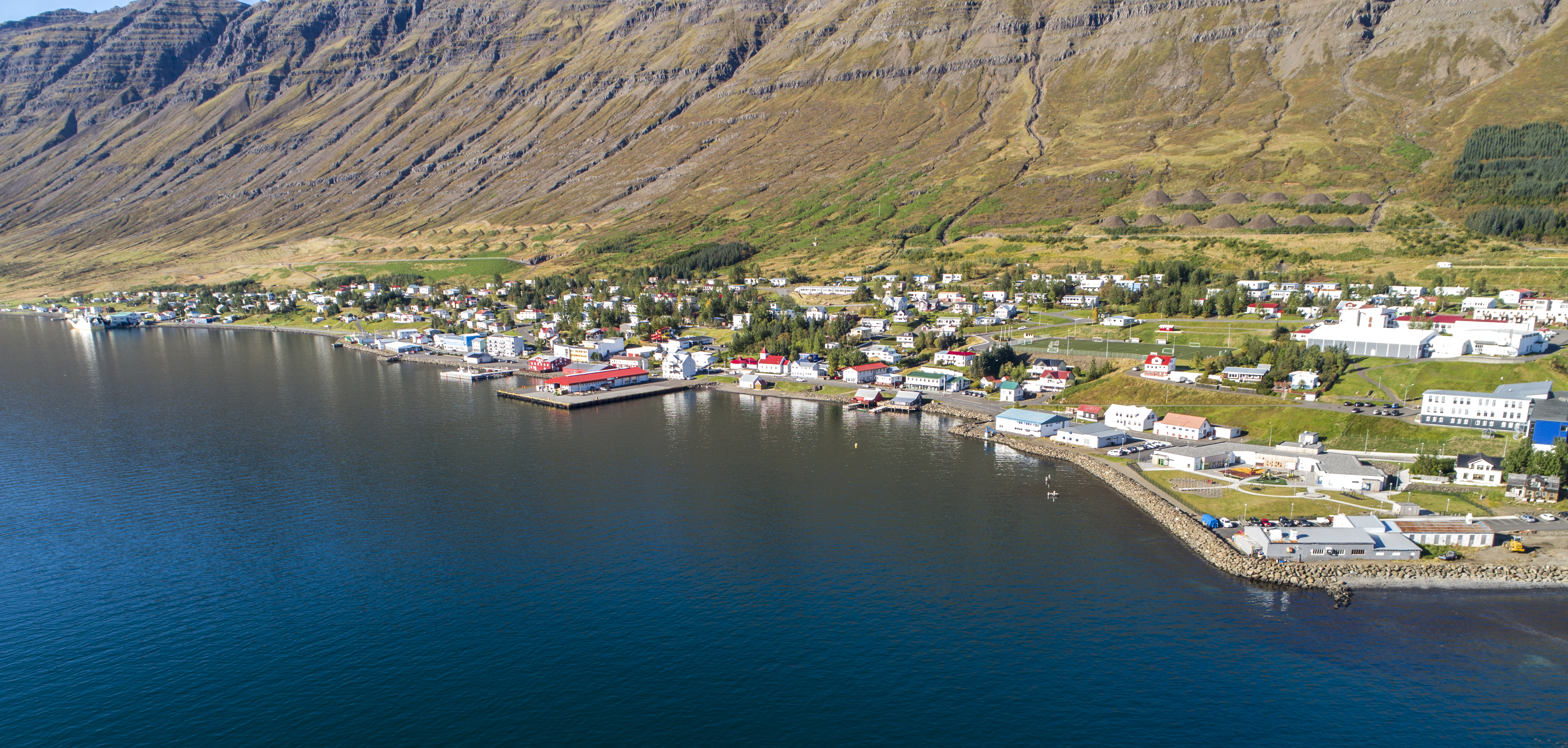
- View of Neskaupstaður

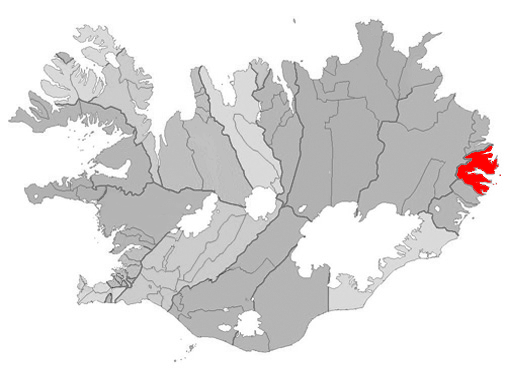
- Location of the Municipality of Fjarðabyggð

- Location in Iceland
- Coordinates: 65°09′N 13°42′W
- Country: Iceland
- Constituency: Northeast Constituency
- Region: Eastern Region
- Municipality: Fjarðabyggð

Population (2016)
  - Total: 1,481
- Time zone: UTC+0 (GMT)
- Website: Official website

Neskaupstaður (Icelandic pronunciation: [ˈnɛsˌkʰœypˌstaːðʏr̥]) is a town located on the fjord Norðfjörður [ˈnɔrðˌfjœrðʏr̥] on the eastern side of Iceland, against the Norwegian Sea. It is part of the municipality of Fjarðabyggð and, as of 2016, it has a population of 1,481. Neskaupstaður is the second largest town in Eastern Region. The town was originally built on a farm called "Nes", settled by Egill Rauði ("the red").

East Iceland regional hospital is located in the town.

The town was nicknamed "Little Moscow" in the 20th century due its strong socialist background.

== History ==
Until 1949, the town was accessible via mountain pass in Oddskarð or a boat. Then it was connected through a 626-meter long single-lane tunnel that passed through the Oddskard mountains called Oddskarðsgöng. Oddskarðsgöng was 632 meters above the sea level and was built between 1974 and 1977. Oddskarðsgöng is now closed. The town is now connected with a new 7,542-meter 2-lane tunnel called Norðfjarðargöng which was constructed between 2013 and 2017.

The building of an aluminum smelter and a new hydroelectric power-plant in East Iceland in 2003 reinvigorated the local economy.

Neskaupstaður joined Eskifjörður and Reyðarfjörður in 1998 to form the new municipality of Fjarðabyggð ("fjords-settlement").

== Geography ==
The other villages composing the municipality are: Eskifjörður (1,043 inh.), Fáskrúðsfjörður (662 inh.), Mjóifjörður (35 inh.), Reyðarfjörður (1,102 inh.) and Stöðvarfjörður (203 inh.).

== Climate ==
Climate data for Neskaupstaður (1981–2000)
| Month | Jan | Feb | Mar | Apr | May | Jun | Jul | Aug | Sep | Oct | Nov | Dec | Year |
|---|---|---|---|---|---|---|---|---|---|---|---|---|---|
| Record high °C (°F) | 16.0 (60.8) | 13.3 (55.9) | 14.0 (57.2) | 20.1 (68.2) | 21.2 (70.2) | 24.7 (76.5) | 27.4 (81.3) | 30.1 (86.2) | 24.5 (76.1) | 21.7 (71.1) | 20.2 (68.4) | 14.3 (57.7) | 30.1 (86.2) |
| Mean daily maximum °C (°F) | 3.1 (37.6) | 3.0 (37.4) | 3.0 (37.4) | 4.4 (39.9) | 7.9 (46.2) | 10.9 (51.6) | 13.2 (55.8) | 12.8 (55.0) | 9.9 (49.8) | 6.5 (43.7) | 4.3 (39.7) | 3.0 (37.4) | 6.8 (44.3) |
| Daily mean °C (°F) | 0.4 (32.7) | 0.2 (32.4) | 0.5 (32.9) | 1.8 (35.2) | 5.0 (41.0) | 7.9 (46.2) | 10.2 (50.4) | 9.9 (49.8) | 7.3 (45.1) | 4.0 (39.2) | 1.8 (35.2) | 0.5 (32.9) | 4.1 (39.4) |
| Mean daily minimum °C (°F) | −2.7 (27.1) | −2.6 (27.3) | −2.6 (27.3) | −0.8 (30.6) | 2.0 (35.6) | 4.7 (40.5) | 7.1 (44.8) | 7.0 (44.6) | 4.7 (40.5) | 1.4 (34.5) | −1.0 (30.2) | −2.4 (27.7) | 1.2 (34.2) |
| Record low °C (°F) | −15.6 (3.9) | −12.8 (9.0) | −16.6 (2.1) | −11.9 (10.6) | −6.6 (20.1) | −2.6 (27.3) | 0.0 (32.0) | 1.1 (34.0) | −4.1 (24.6) | −8.8 (16.2) | −9.6 (14.7) | −12.2 (10.0) | −16.6 (2.1) |
| Average precipitation mm (inches) | 217.7 (8.57) | 159.5 (6.28) | 176.1 (6.93) | 102.4 (4.03) | 79.8 (3.14) | 77.1 (3.04) | 75.8 (2.98) | 115.1 (4.53) | 193.8 (7.63) | 269.7 (10.62) | 210.4 (8.28) | 187.6 (7.39) | 1,865 (73.42) |
Source: Icelandic Met Office

== 1974 avalanches ==
On 20 December 1974, avalanches came from the entire mountainside above the town, killing 12 people. Intense snowfall had been reported in the area over the previous few days. Along with the snow came a strong wind that apparently loosened the snow that had fallen on the mountains. According to some accounts, the first small-scale avalanche actually occurred on 19 December; however, due to low visibility, no-one noticed it. Since the time of the deadly avalanches, a number of protective barriers have been installed with the aim of avoiding future avalanches. Prior to the 1974 avalanche, in 1885 and 1894, two other avalanches had been recorded, with the former causing several deaths in two farms.

== Economy ==
Síldarvinnslan hf. operates one of the most advanced fish processing plants in Europe, it mainly produces fish for human consumption. The company and its partners operate in five locations in Iceland and in the US and Greenland. The company along with partners employ about 500 workers, and the 2010 revenue was US$128 million.

== Tourism ==
The town

The Museum House (Safnahúsið) located in the center of the town (Egilsbraut 2) houses an art gallery, a natural history museum and a maritime museum under one roof. The art gallery displays a number of paintings by Tryggvi Ólafsson – one of Iceland's most celebrated contemporary artists. The natural history museum hosts an interesting collection of Icelandic mammals, shellfish, birds, insect and stones. The maritime museum houses a number of fishing and boat related old equipment from Josafat Hinriksson family. A small replica of Josafat's workshop is also an interesting part of the museum. The Museum House is open between 1:00 pm and 5:00 pm from 1 June to 31 August.

Nordfjardarnipais and the surrounding area became Iceland's first official national park in 1972. Nordfjardarnipais separates Nordfjordur from Mjoifjordur.

The town hosts a three-day metal, hardcore, punk, rock and indie music festival, Eistnaflug, in July. The festival started as a small one day metal festival in 2005 but has since grown significantly. According to a local estimate, approximately 2,000 people attended the festival in 2015. Most of the attendees put up tents at the end of the town.

Nearest airport is Egilsstaðir, about 74 km by road. The main carrier is Air Iceland with flights to Reykjavík.

== Notable natives ==
Tryggvi Ólafsson one of Iceland's best known contemporary artists was born here in 1940. He studied art at the National College of Arts and Crafts in Reykjavik before going to the National Academy Art Academy in Copenhagen.

== In popular culture ==
The 2002 Icelandic movie Hafið (The Sea) was filmed almost entirely in and around Neskaupstaður.

== Twin towns ==
- Stavanger (Norway)
- Jyväskylä (Finland)

== Photo Gallery ==
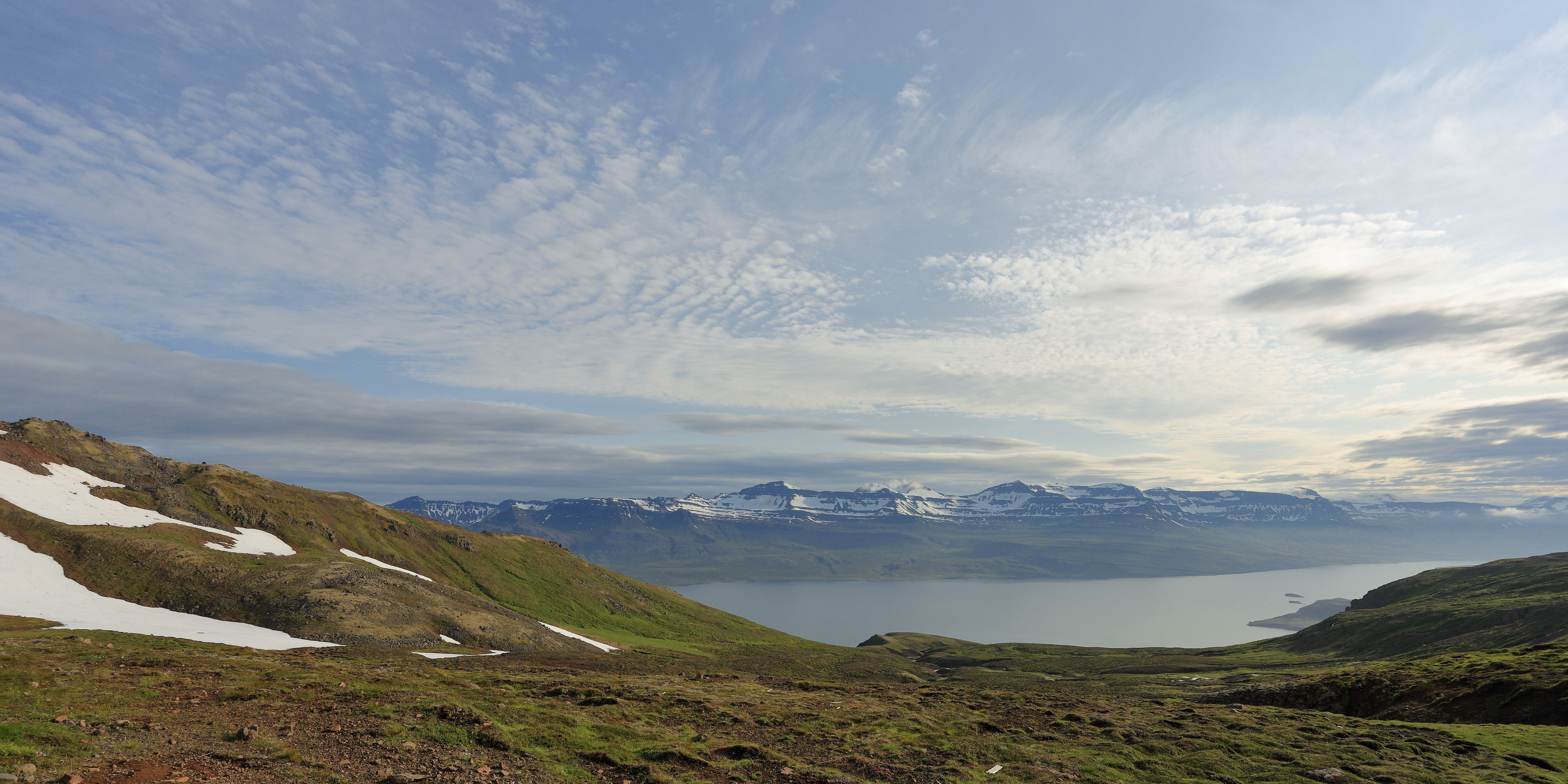
Icelandic Landscape near Neskaupstaður July 2014
