= Eastern Region (Iceland) =

Region of Iceland

Eastern Region Austurland (Icelandic)
- Region
- The Austurland area
- Coordinates: 65°17′N 14°23′W
- Country: Iceland
- Largest town: Egilsstaðir

Area
  - Total: 15,706 km^{2} (6,064 sq mi)

Population (2024)
  - Total: 11,085
  - Density: 0.71/km^{2} (1.8/sq mi)
- Time zone: UTC+00:00 (WET)
  - Summer (DST): (Not observed)
- ISO 3166 code: IS-7
- Website: east.is

Eastern Region (Icelandic: Austurland; pronounced [ˈœystʏrˌlant]) is a region in eastern Iceland. Its area is 15,706 square kilometres (6,064 sq mi). In 2024 the population was 11,085. The Eastern Region has a jagged coastline of fjords, referred to as the Eastfjords (Austfirðir; [ˈœystˌfɪrðɪr̥]).

The largest town in the region is Egilsstaðir, with a population of 2,632. The oldest municipality is Djúpivogur, which received their trading licence in 1589, it had a population of 412 in 2024.

The only car and passenger ferry that sails between Iceland and the European continent calls at Seyðisfjörður once a week except in the winter season.

The region is home to the Kárahnjúkar Hydropower Plant. Among notable tourist destinations are the Helgustaðir mine, which is known for its Iceland spar, and Stuðlagil.

== See also ==
- Category:Populated places in Eastern Region (Iceland)
