= Lagarfljót Worm =

Icelandic lake monster cryptid

Creature information
- Other name: Lagarfljótsormur
- Sub grouping: Lake monster

Origin
- First attested: 1345
- Country: Iceland
- Habitat: Lagarfljót

In Icelandic folklore, the Lagarfljót worm (Icelandic: Lagarfljótsormurinn, Icelandic pronunciation: [ˈlaːɣarˌfljoutsˌɔrmʏr̥]), worm meaning serpent or dragon, is a lake monster purported to live in Lagarfljót, a lake by the town of Egilsstaðir.

== Overview ==
The first sighting is generally conceded to be the 1345 "marvel" seen at Lagarfljót century chronicle, and recorded in the medieval annals of the 15th century. The serpent at the lake has been mentioned in 16th century world maps, a 17th century chronicle, and a baroque poem from the 17th century chronicle.

The skrýmsli (monster) was seen at the lake in 1749–1750, and the media have reported sightings into the 20th and 21st centuries, including a 2012 video supposedly showing the creature swimming.

According to the folktale published in Jón Árnason's collection (1862), a "heath worm" (type of slug) kept with gold grew into a monster inhabiting the lake.

Similar "heath worm" stories are attached to several other Icelandic bodies of water. At Skorradalsvatn, Sabine Baring-Gould collected an 1862 account of a monster with a seal-like head, which has been compared to or equated with older accounts of monsters at Lagarfljót.

== Description and habitat ==
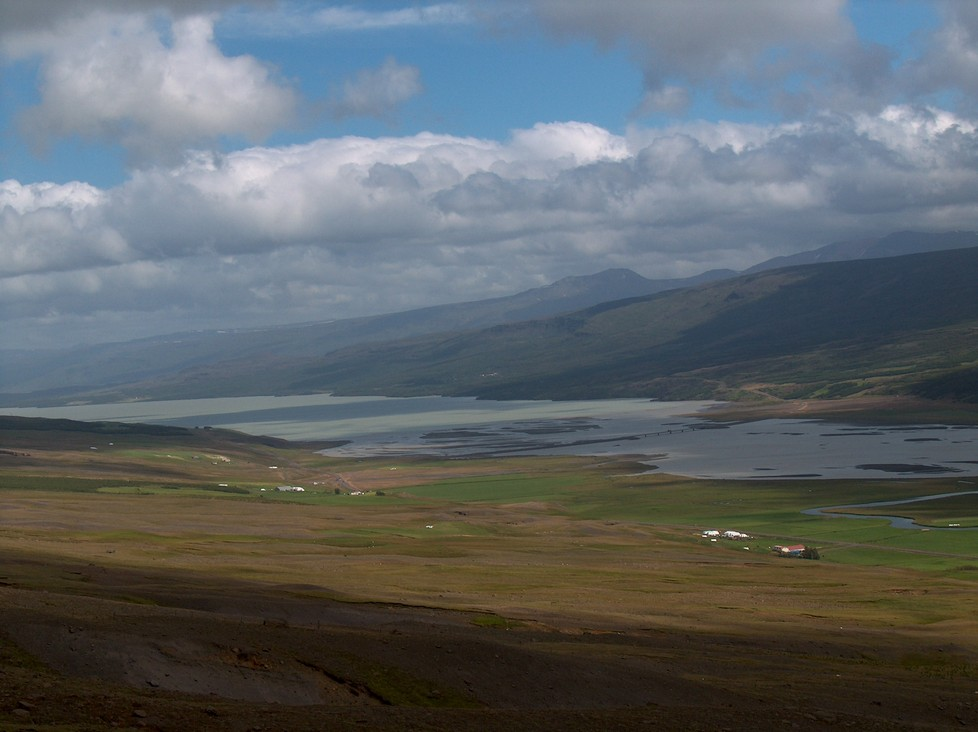
Lagarfljót

The serpentine creature is said to live in Lagarfljót, a freshwater, below-sea-level, glacial-fed lake which has very poor visibility as a result of siltation. The creature is described as longer than a bus, or 40 feet (12 m), and has also been reported outside the water, lying coiled up or slithering into the trees. It is a "many humps" type of lake monster, as opposed to the variety commonly characterized as having an extended neck, like the Loch Ness Monster.

The Lagarfljót Worm has been the subject of several reports in modern times, including in 1963 by the head of the Icelandic National Forest Service, Sigurður Blöndal, and in 1998 by a teacher and students at Hallormsstaðir School. In 1983, contractors laying a telephone cable measured a large shifting mass near the eastern shore while performing preliminary depth measurements, and when they later retrieved the cable, found that it was broken where the anomaly had occurred:

"This cable that was specially engineered so it wouldn't kink was wound in several places and badly torn and damaged in 22 different places . . . . I believe we dragged the cable directly over the belly of the beast. Unless it was through its mouth".

A sightseeing boat named Lagarfljótsormurinn, which began operations on the lake in 1999, and the Gunnar Gunnarsson Institution in Skriðuklaustur seek to preserve the traditions of the Lagarfljót Worm for cultural and tourism purposes.

=== 2012 video ===
In February 2012, the Icelandic national broadcaster, RÚV, published a video thought to show the Lagarfljót Worm swimming in snow-covered icy water. But according to a frame-by-frame analysis of the footage by Finland-based researcher Miisa McKeown, the filmed object actually made no progress through the water, although optical illusion made it appear as though it was propelling itself forward. The phenomenon could be explained by a flimsy inanimate object (such as a frozen fish net) being moved by rapid current. Despite this, in 2012, an Icelandic panel voted by a 7-to-6 margin to authenticate the video as genuine, awarding money to the filmmaker. This received criticism as an attempt to attract cryptotourism visitors.

In August 2014, an Icelandic truth commission reported that members were divided about the video but saw no reason to doubt the existence of the creature.

== Literary and oral records ==
"There are many stories of kynjaskepnur, that is, strange animals or unknown phenomena, in Lagarfljót". These include accounts of the Lagarfljót Worm, as well as other monsters, a strandvorm, or a monstrous seal or poisonous skate.

=== Annals ===
The legend of the worm is arguably first mentioned in the entry for year 1345 in Icelandic Annals (specifically the Skálholts Annáll which reaches AD 1430), although the text only refers to the sighting as a "wonderful thing" (undarligr [h]lutr) or a marvel, and not specifically as a worm. The "thing" seen in Lagarfljót looked like either islands or humps out of water, distanced hundreds of fathoms apart, but no one saw that it had either a head or tail. The creatures were documented in annals with some frequency in subsequent times as well.

=== 16th to 17th century ===
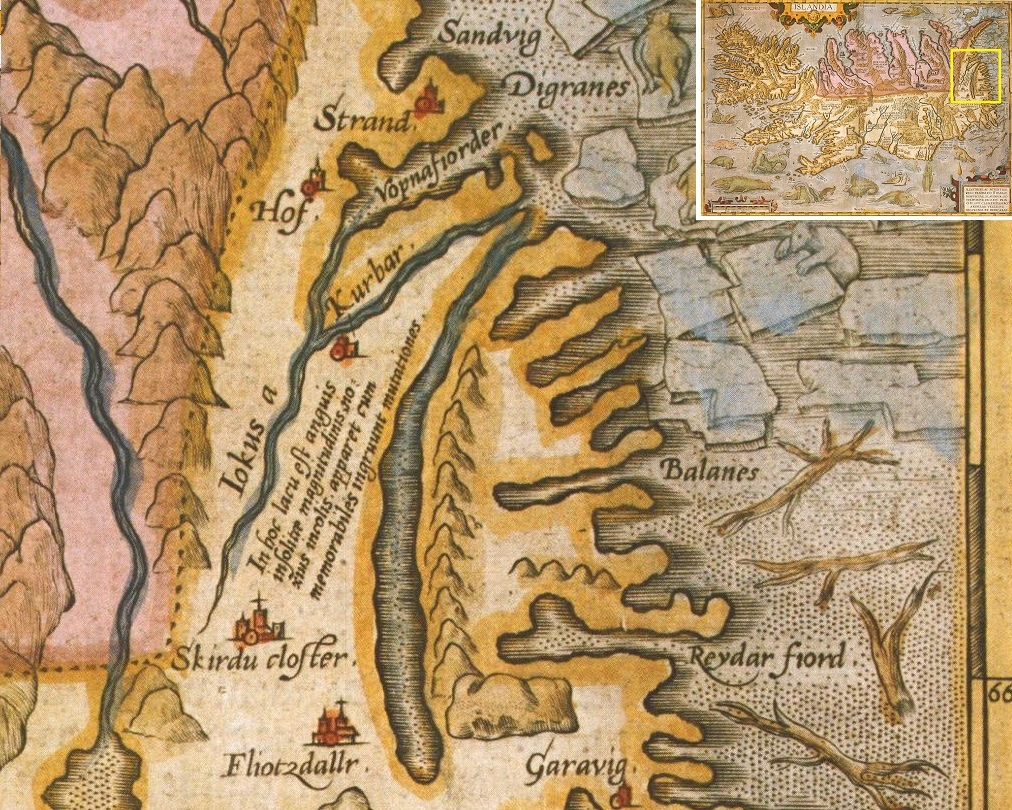
Abraham Ortelius's map of Iceland. Detail around Lagarfljót showing the inscription

The map of Iceland attributed to Bishop Guðbrandur Þorláksson, engraved in 1585 by cartographer Abraham Ortelius is another attestation. (Note: This map did not appear in the original edition of Ortelius's atlas Theatrum Orbis Terrarum, but was supplemented in Additametum IV published 1590.) The map bears inscription next to Lagarfljót stating that "In this lake appears a large serpent (In hoc lacu est anguis insolitæ magnitudinis)" which poses a menace to the inhabitants and appears when some memorable event is imminent". A briefer inscription noting only a serpent of great size is found on a Mercator map of 1595.

Bishop Oddur Einarsson's Qualiscunque descriptio Islandiae (ca. 1589) also contains an account of a Lagarfljót monster, probably the serpent.

A description of a supposed river-serpent that dwelled in Lagarfljót river occurs in De mirabilibus Islandiae (Chapter VI), written by the Bishop Gísli Oddsson of Skálholt (d. 1638). The serpent was referred to as a strandvorm in the Norwegian language. (Note: Latin: lingva norvegica.) Opinions differed on how many humps (or rather "bends, curvatures" (Note: Latin: curvatura.)) it had, varyingly given as one, two, or three. It was blamed for making the river overflow and causing the ground and houses to shake.

=== Folktale ===
A folktale published by Jón Árnason in 1862, collected from a schoolgirl of Múlasýsla in 1845 tells the story of the great serpent in Lagarfljót which originally started out as small "heath-worm" or "Heath Snake" (Icelandic: lyngormur) before it grew to unmanageable size. It has been explained elsewhere that this "heath-worm" is actually a type of snail (Icelandic: brekkusnegill), or rather the black slug, Arion ater. (Note: Commonly called svarti snigil meaning "black slug" nowadays.) (Note: Jacqueline Simpson considered the "Heath Snake" (lýngorm) mentioned in the tale to be a strictly "mythical creature", rather than a real animal in nature with mythical lore attached to it.)

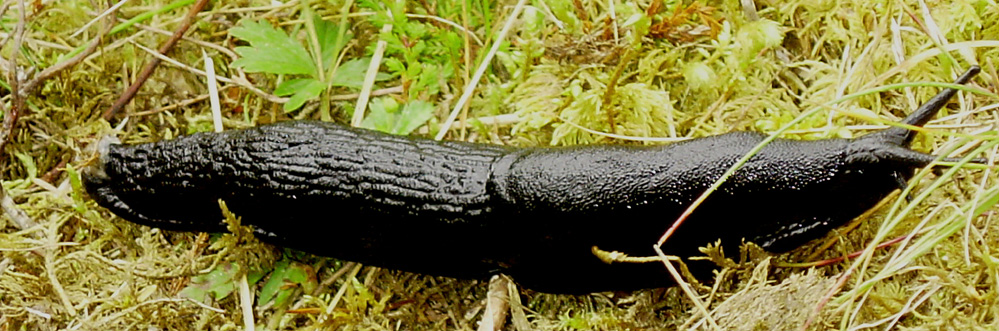
A black slug aka "heath worm" lyngormur.

The girl had been given a gold ring by her mother, and was instructed that the best way to profit from the gold was to place it under a heath-worm (black slug). She did so, and put it in the top of her linen chest for a few days, but then found that the little worm (serpent, dragon) had grown so large, it had broken open the chest. Frightened, she threw both it and the gold into the lake, where the heath-worm continued to grow and terrorize the countryside, spitting poison and killing people and animals. Two Finns were commissioned to destroy it and retrieve the gold, but they only managed to tie its head and tail to the bottom of the lake; killing it was made impossible because of a still larger dragon that lurked underneath. Appearances of the creature in the open was considered a portent for harsh season or fodder grass crop failure.

There has been suggestion that this is a corruption of the lore surrounding creatures from Norse mythology, namely the Miðgarð Serpent and Fenriswolf, with some elements of Fáfnir, the gold-hoarding dragon of Gnitaheiði from the Völsung Cycle. Similarity to the overgrown dragon in Ragnars saga Loðbrókar has also been noted, for in this saga the dragon also grew large along with its gold.

==== Heath snakes and other bodies of water ====
The legend that keeping a brekkusnegill (black slug) together with gold will make both grow enormous is associated with other bodies of water, namely Skorradalsvatn (see below), Kleifarvatn, and the Hvítá and Skaftá Rivers.

== Related legends ==
=== Serpent, skate and seal ===
Accounts of a serpent sitting on gold, the poisonous skate, and a strange giant seal localized at Lagarfljót are told of in the baroque poem "Rönkufótsríma" by Stefán Ólafsson (d. 1688). (Note: Margrét Eggertsdóttir says that according to the poem there awakened "the Lagarfljót monster with its nine humps".)

The gold-hoarding serpent according to the poem measured one-half Þingmannleið in length or approximately 20 km, (Note: A Þingmannleið is defined as 5 Danish miles or 7.5325 km × 5 = 37.6 km. Half this is 18.8 kilometres (11.7 miles). The wyrm's website nearly concurs, stating "half of nearly forty kilometres". Jón Thorkelsson and Herrmann merely note that this equals 2.5 [German] mile (German: drittehalb Meilen), which is the same length, since the Danish and German miles are set equal.) and had its head and tail pinned to the ground (lakebed).

Jón Árnason also touched upon the skate and seal (Selurinn og skatan í Lagarfljóti) in his 1862 book. It was poisonous enough to kill anyone who touched it with one finger. To prevent it from doing harm, the monster was bound by potent magic poetry uttered by "power poets". Other sources say the skate had nine tails.

The seal had strange hair like branches growing out of its head, and it too was bound with poetry at the waterfall where it dwelled.

=== Skrýmsli of Lagarfljót ===
A one-humped "monster" (skrýmsli) of Lagarfljót was allegedly spotted in 1749–1750. This has been treated as the creature of the same ilk as the humped creature of the annals by Sabine Baring-Gould, and in more modern times, equated with "The Water-Snake of Lagarfljot" by Jacqueline Simpson, an authority on dragon legends in the British Isles.

=== Skrimsl of Skorradalsvatn ===
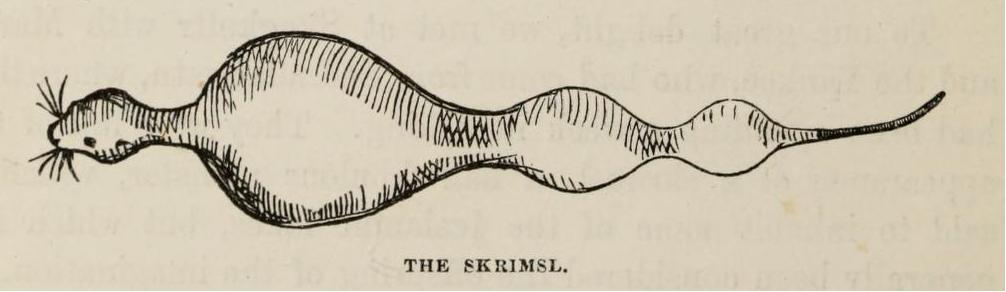
A lake monster reportedly seen at Skorradalsvatn.

Baring-Gould (1863) had obtained reports about a 46 feet long lake monster (which he referred to as a "skrimsl") allegedly surfacing in Skorradalsvatn and witnessed by at least three farmers. (Note: Baring-Gould visited Iceland in 1862, and he collected a recent report. One week before the aughor, Mr. Martin and the "Yankee" arrived at the lake, and the appearances happened the day before that.) It had a head like a seal's, and subsequently one hump appeared in view, then another. A sketch was produced by one of the witnesses, and Baring-Gould printed a replica of it. The author considered the description to bear an uncanny resemblance to the creature reported in the annals.

The term skrimsl is Old Norse, equivalent to modern Icelandic skrýmsli and refers to "monster", however it was specifically used in the sense of "sea or lake monster" (German: Meer-ungeheuer) in Konrad Maurer's book on Icelandic folk legends (1860).

== Suggested explanations ==
Jón Árnason remarked that there were non-believers of the worm in his time in the 19th century who offered the rational explanation that clumps of foam drifting past could have misled witnesses.

Various other rational explanations have also been advanced. Gas rises from the lake bed here, even creating openings in the ice. Such bubbles of methane, which can be quite large, could be the identity of reported sightings of the worm. Or, these gas bubbles can also lift debris from the lake bottom to the surface, or the bubbles could refract the light differently than in surrounding air and create optical illusions. Flotsam from the mountain sides and forests also collects in tangles that can look like some sort of monster. According to Helgi Hallgrímsson, an Icelandic biologist who has extensively studied the lake, both of these could explain some but not all of the sightings, while traditional legendary material could explain some of the stories.
