= Bakkagerði =

- Village
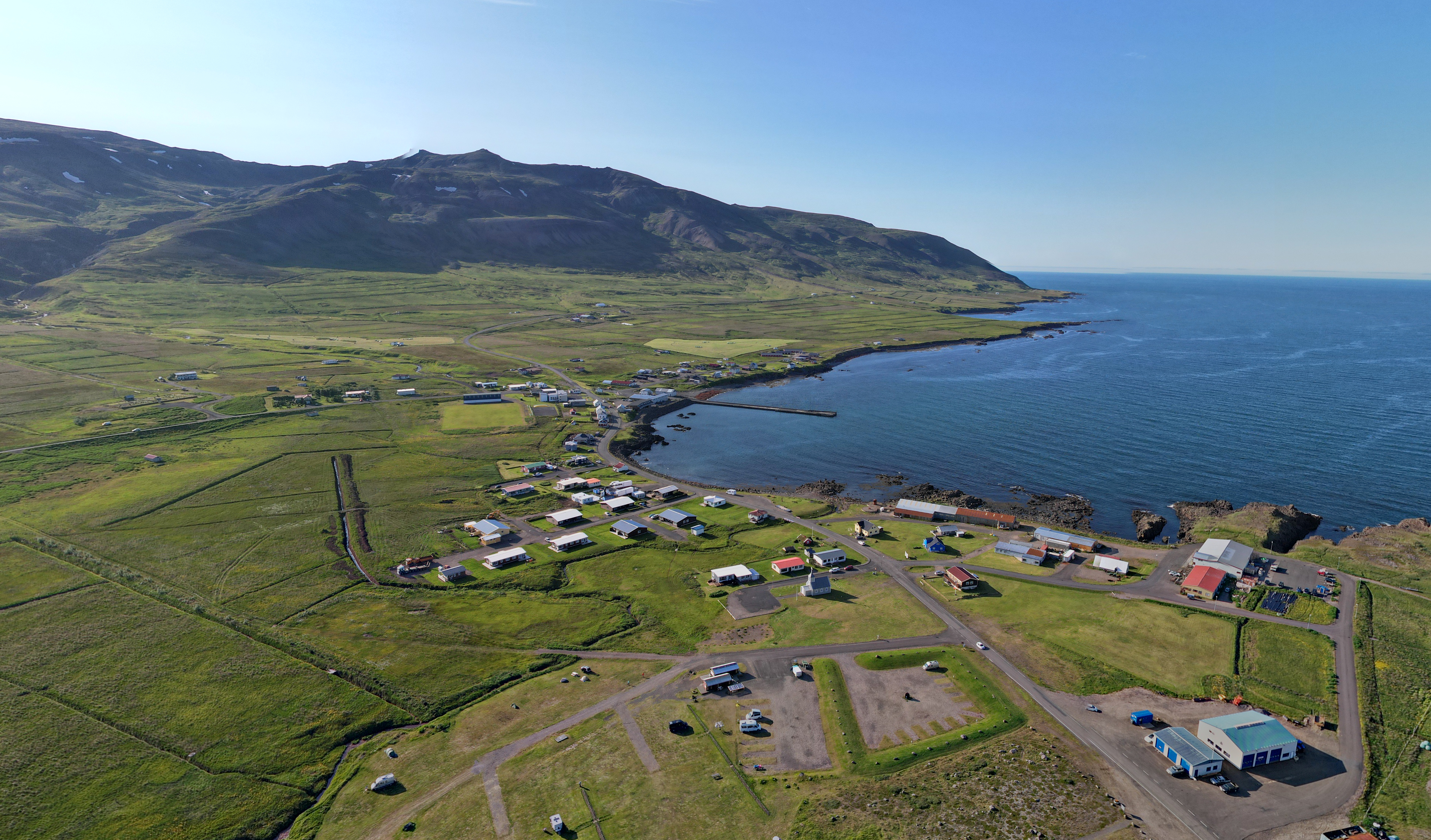
- Bakkagerði

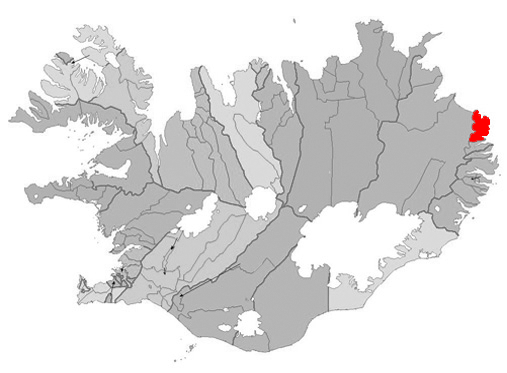
- Location of the Municipality of Borgarfjarðarhreppur

- Location of Bakkagerði in Iceland
- Coordinates: 65°40′N 14°25′W
- Country: Iceland
- Constituency: Northeast Constituency
- Region: Eastern Region
- Municipality: Borgarfjarðarhreppur
- Time zone: UTC+0 (GMT)
- Website: Official website

Bakkagerði (Icelandic pronunciation: [ˈpahkaˌcɛrðɪ]) is a coastal hamlet in eastern Iceland. It is a part of the municipality of Múlaþing and situated on the coast of the Borgarfjörður eystri.

== History ==
Bakkagerði was declared an official trading place in 1894 when Iceland was still a part of Denmark. The present harbour was built in 1943, enlarged in 1974 and improved in 2001. In 2020 Bakkagerði, which was a part of the municipality of Borgarfjarðarhreppur, united with Seyðisfjörður, Djúpivogur and Fljótsdalshérað to form the new community of Múlaþing which is the largest community in Iceland.

== Culture ==
Jóhannes Sveinsson Kjarval, one of the most important Icelandic painters, was born and raised in Bakkagerði. In 1914 he created one of his masterpieces, showing Jesus holding the Sermon on the Mount, in this village. On the painting Álfaborg, a famous rock close to the village, and the mountain range Dyrfjöll are clearly recognizable. The piece of art which is one of the most famous attractions of the village can be seen above the altar. The wooden church itself, Bakkagerðiskirkja, was consecrated in 1901 and renovated in 2001. Originally the church was built at the farm Desjarmýri in the south of Bakkagerði and there was no church in the village itself. As wood has always been a very valuable and scarse material in Iceland, the church was dismantled when it was no longer needed on the farm and reconstructed in the village in 1901.

Lindarbakki is a renovated turf house which was built in 1899. Its basement where an old well can be seen dates from 1899 and most of the interior of Lindarbakki is from 1934. The house (30 m^{2}) consists of one kitchen and a living-room.

Some Icelanders believe in elves: Álfaborg, a tall rock close to Bakkagerði, is said to the residence of their queen.

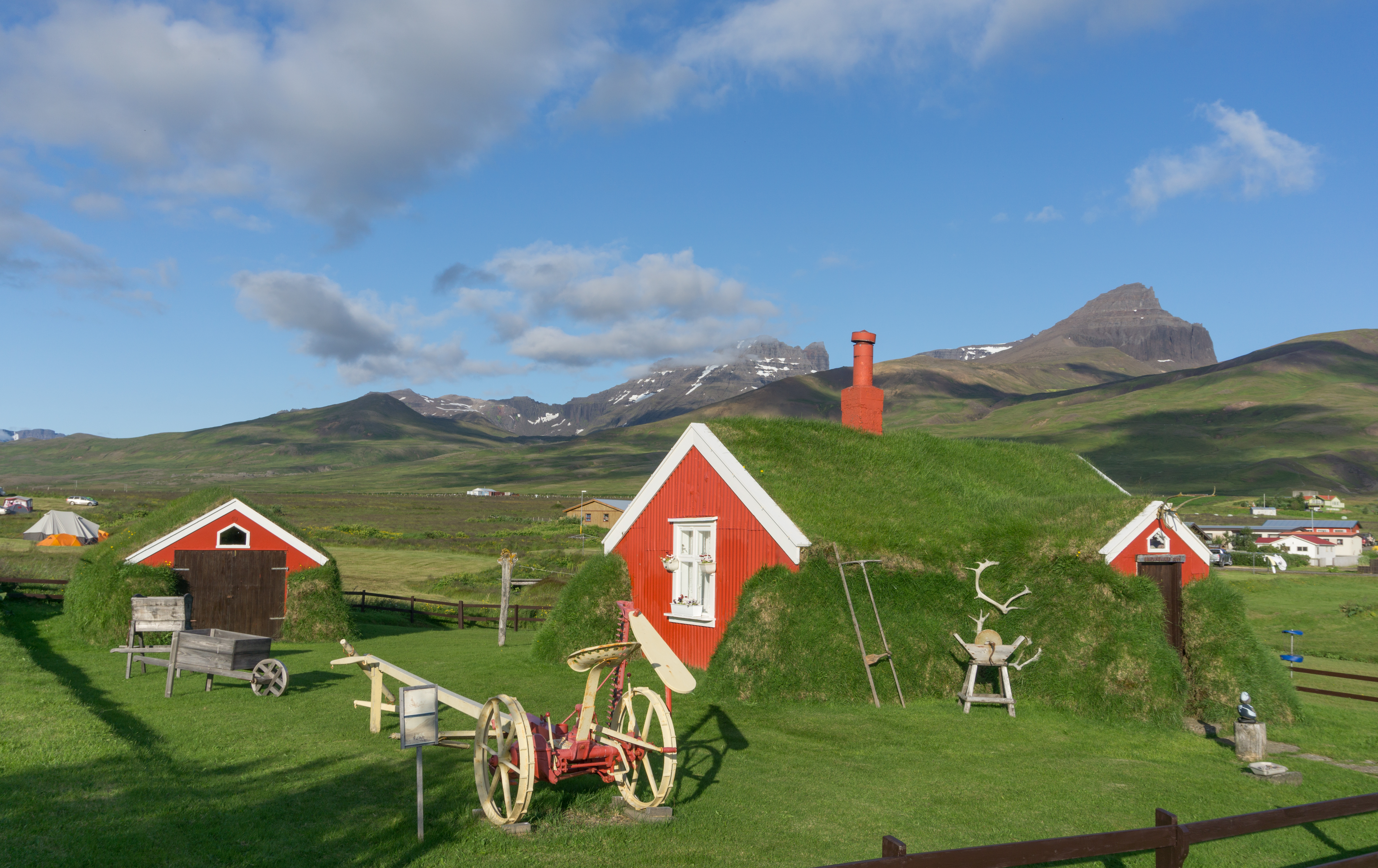
Lindabakki, a turf house in Bakkagerði

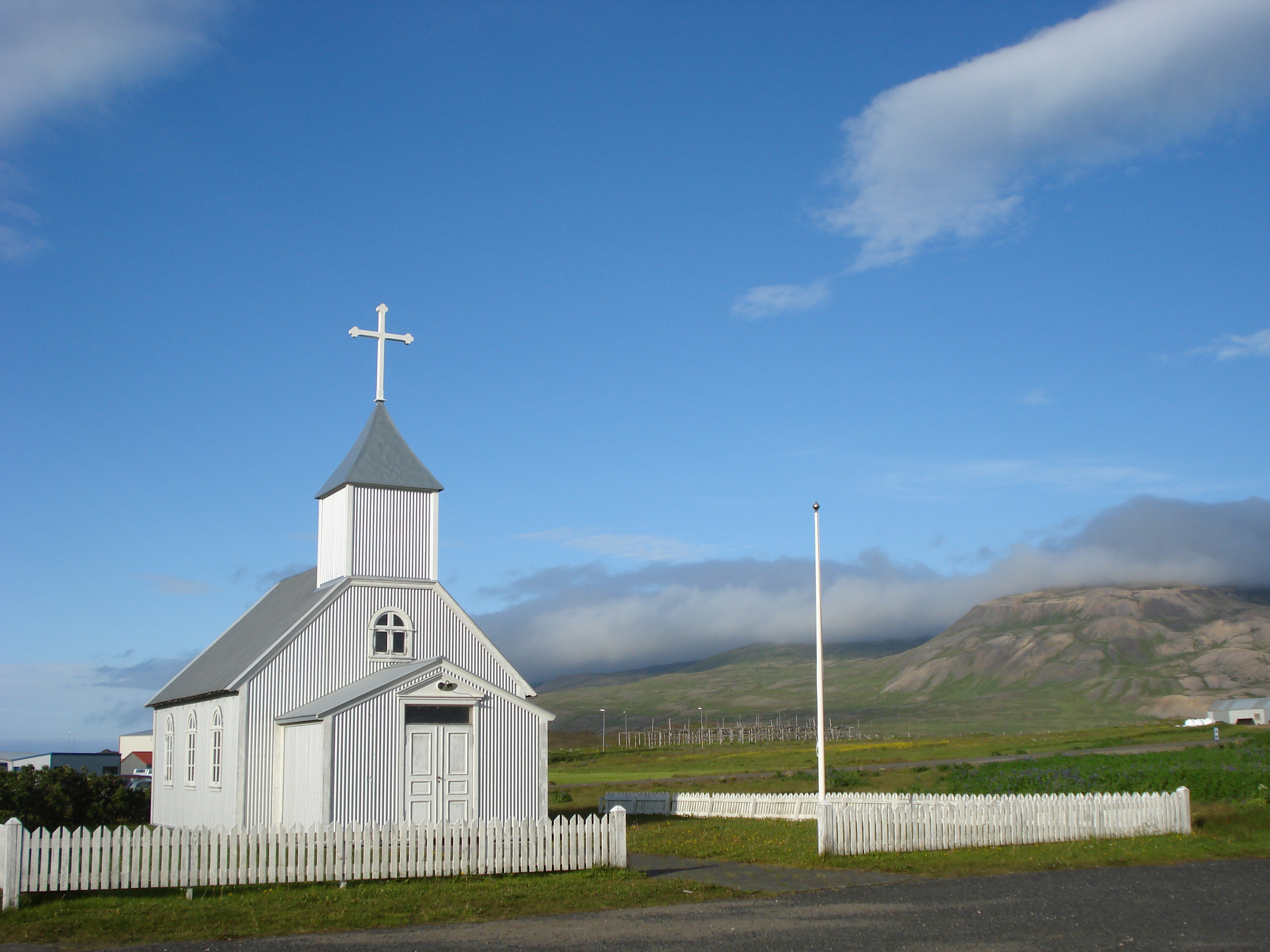
Church in Bakkagerði

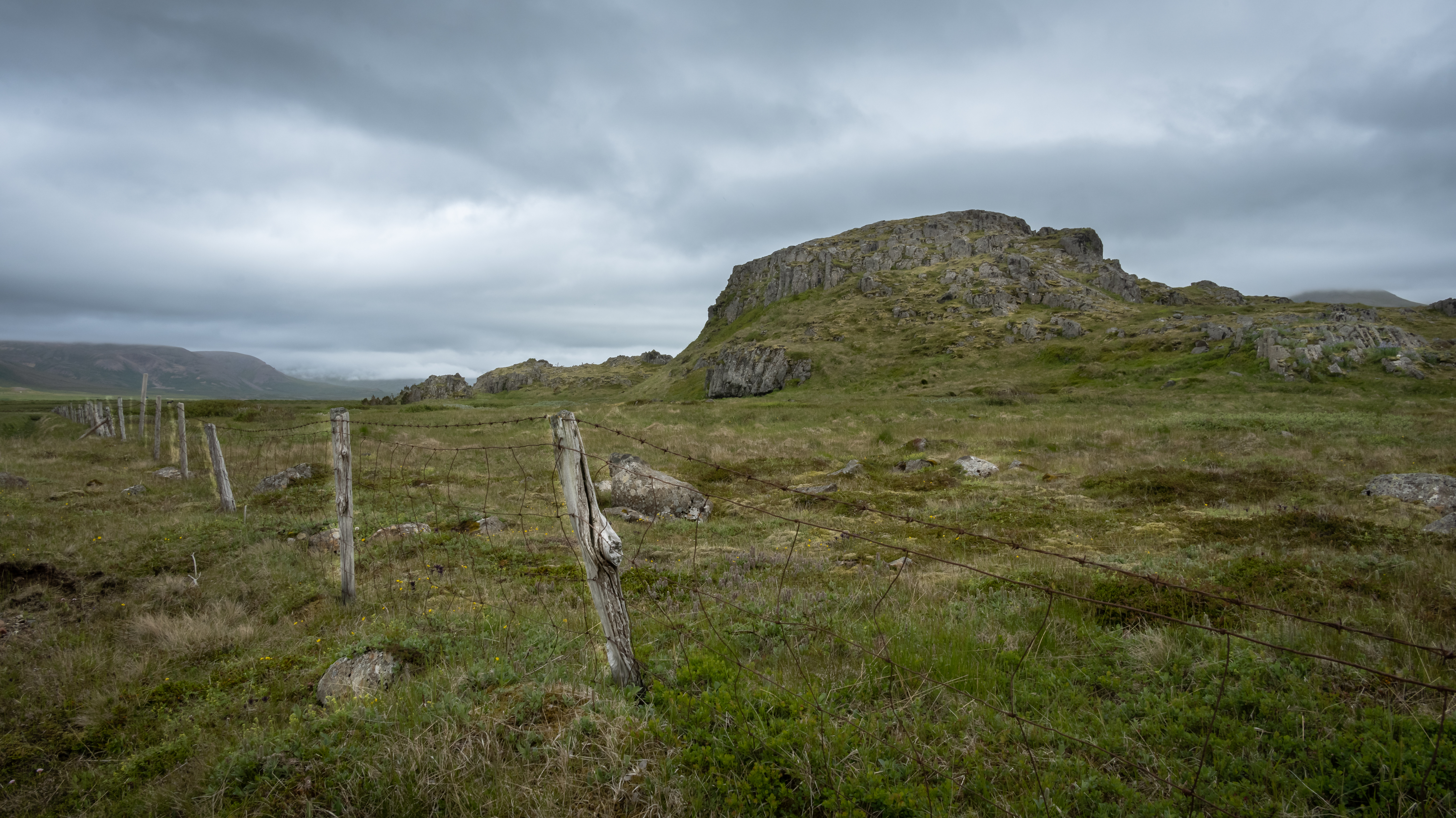
Álfaborg

There are various historical places around Bakkagerði. The farm Hjaltastaður on the road to Egilsstaðir has an old wooden church, Hjaltastaðakirkja, dating from 1881. Kirkjubaejarkirkja, built in 1851, is another wooden church in the west of Hjaltastaður with a ridge turret and a colourful pulpit dating from the 16th century. The pulpit ist said to be oldest existing pulpit in Iceland. The retable was created in 1894. The church was renovated in 2001 exactly 150 years after the inauguration. There is a track from Bakkagerði to Húsavík, a hamlet 20 km in the south which was abandoned in 1973. Originally Húsavík consisted of four farms on the bay bearing the same name. The wooden church Húsavíkurkirkja was built 1937–39, and several of its pieces of art are exhibited in the National Museum of Iceland in Reykjavík now.

== Economy ==
Originally Bakkagerði was a fishing village. Today various farms around Bakkagerði are specialized in eiderduck farming. Eiderdown beddings and pillows are produced in a company in Bakkagerði. Tourism has become an important source of income for the town.

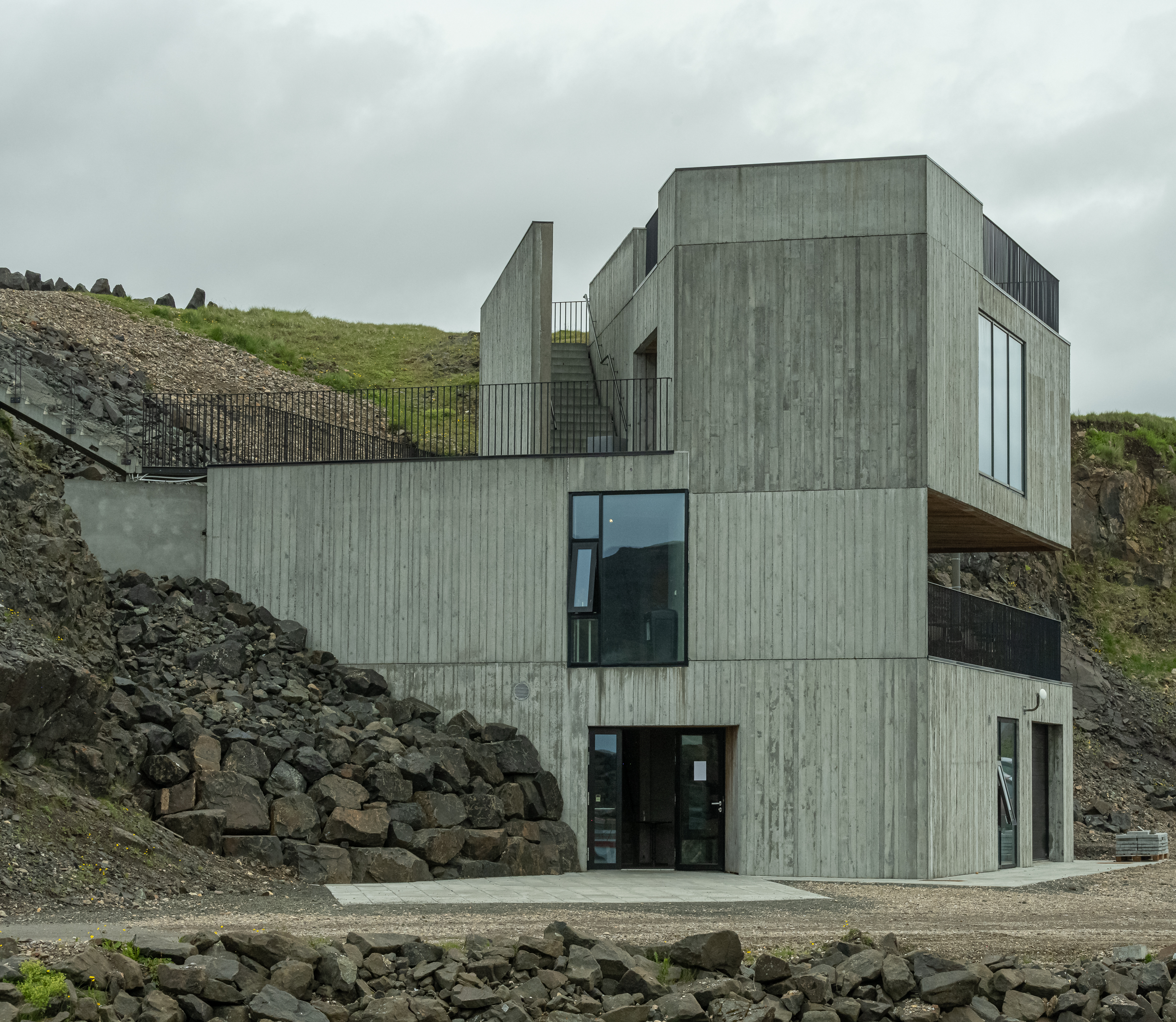
Port building

== Infrastructure ==
Bakkagerði has a primary school with a kindergarten and a public library, a health care center (heilsugaeslustöð), a bank, a post office, a gas station and a village shop (Búðin Borgarfirði). There is also accommodation for tourists, a hotel, a restaurant, a café, a golf course and a camping site. Various tour operators offer day trips and guided tours. There is a regular bus service once a day to and from Egilsstaðir. The nearest airport is Egilsstaðir Airport.

== Nature ==
There are various hiking trails around Bakkagerði, especially in Víknaslóðir, an uninhabited landscape in the south of Bakkagerði between the fiords Lödmundarfjörður and Borgarfjörður. The town's nickname is "Puffins' capital of Iceland" as there is a large puffin colony Hafnarhólmi Rock near the harbor.
