= Hallormsstaður =

Village in eastern Iceland

- Village
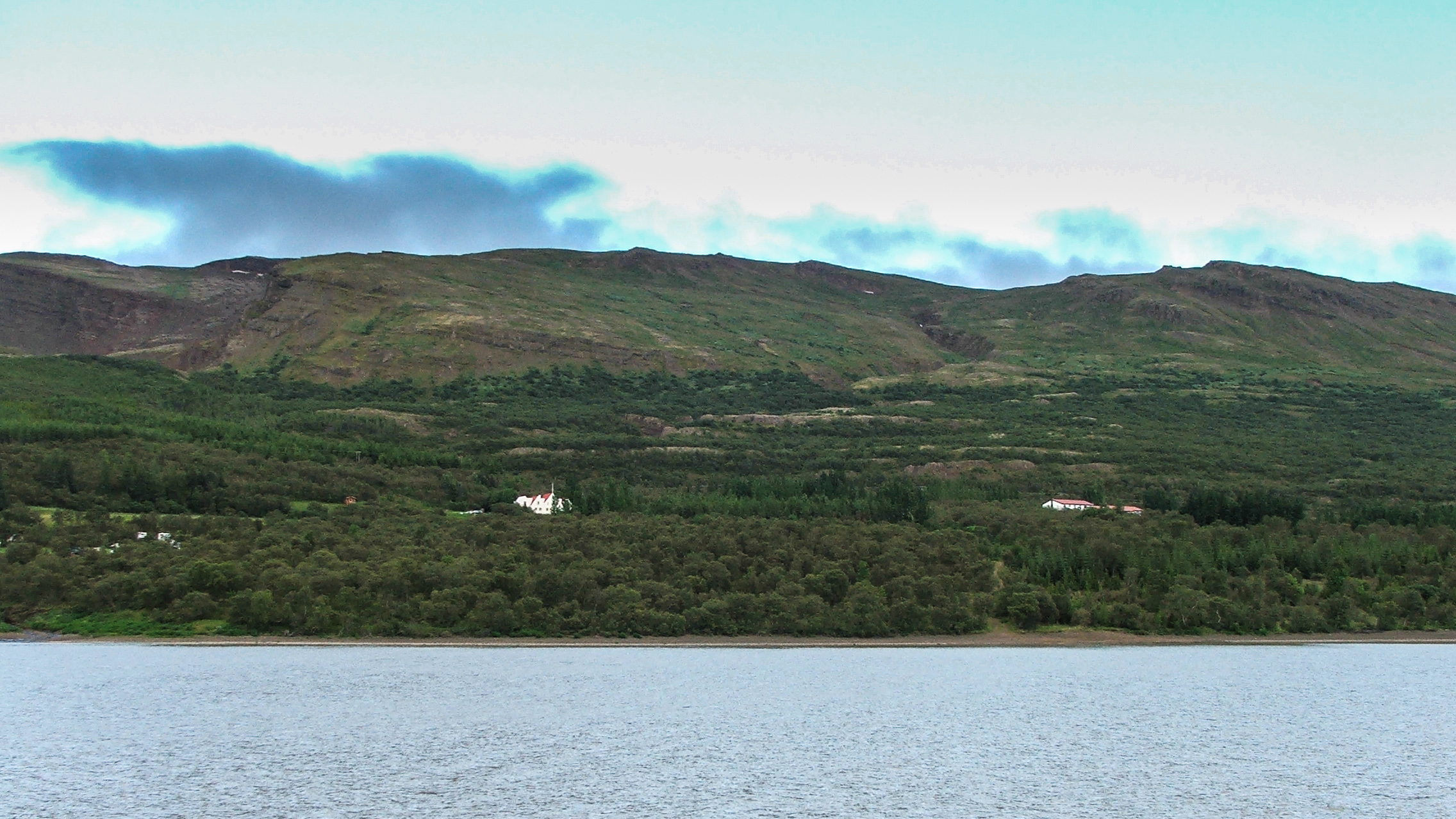
- Hallormsstaður seen from Lagarfljót
- Interactive map of Hallormsstaður
- Location within Iceland
- Coordinates: 65.0931°N 14.7469°W
- Country: Iceland
- Region: Austurland
- Constituency: Norðausturkjördæmi
- Municipality: Múlaþing

Population (2024)
  - Total: 26
- Time zone: UTC+00:00 (WET)
- Postal code(s): 701
- Website: www.mulathing.is

Hallormsstaður (Icelandic pronunciation: [ˈhatlˌɔ(r)msˌstaːðʏr̥]) is a village in East Iceland, and it sits on the eastern shore of Lagarfljót surrounded by Hallormsstaðaskógur. The village is 27 km (17 mi) away from Egilsstaðir. (Note: However, Vegagerðin states that the village is 26 km (16 mi) from the town of Egilsstaðir.) There are camping grounds in the Atlavík cove.

Ringo Starr performed with the band Stuðmenn in Atlavík in 1984.

The former primary school Hallormsstaðarskóli closed down in 2015.

== Transportation ==
Upphéraðsvegur bridge over Lagarfljót, south of Hallormsstaður

Hallormsstaður is on Upphéraðsvegur (road 931). Nearby is Skriðdals- og Breiðdalsvegur (road 95) and Fljótsdalsvegur (road 933).

The village mainly consists of the Fjósakambur and Réttarkambur streets.

== See also ==
- Fljótsdalur
- Localities of Iceland
- Skriðuklaustur – Farm and historical site in eastern Iceland
