= Egilsstaðir =

Town in eastern Iceland

- Town
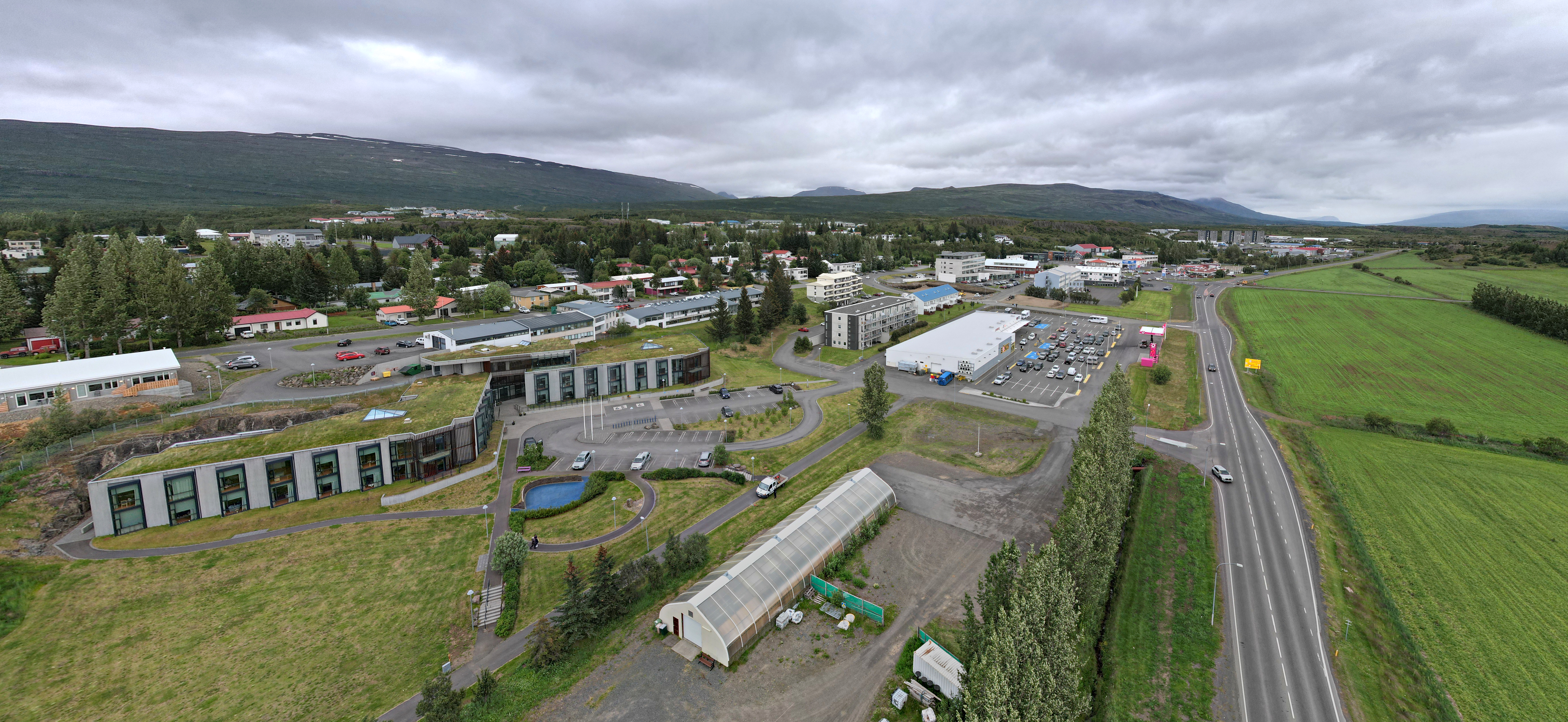
- 2023 view of Egilsstaðir

- Location of the Municipality of Múlaþing

- Location in Iceland
- Coordinates: 65°17′N 14°23′W
- Country: Iceland
- Constituency: Northeast Constituency
- Region: Eastern Region
- Municipality: Múlaþing

Population (2024)
  - Town: 2,632
  - Metro: 3,047^{[a]}
- Time zone: UTC+0 (GMT)
- Postal code(s): 700, 701
- Website: www.egilsstadir.is

Egilsstaðir (Icelandic pronunciation: [ˈeijɪlsˌstaːðɪr̥]) is a town in east Iceland on the banks of the Lagarfljót river.

It is part of the municipality of Múlaþing and the largest settlement of the eastern region of Iceland with, as of 2024, a population of 2,632 inhabitants. Formerly Egilsstaðir was part of Norður-Múlasýsla.

== Overview ==
Egilsstaðir is located 65°17′N 14°23′W. The town is young, even by Icelandic standards where urbanization is a fairly recent trend compared to mainland Europe. It was established in 1947 as an effort by the surrounding rural districts recognizing it had become a regional service centre. The town takes its name from an individual farmstead and is in this respect relatively unique within the country where most or all of the towns take a name from landmarks. It is near the bridge over Lagarfljót where all the main roads of the region meet, Route 1 as well as the main routes to the Eastern Region.

Egilsstaðir has grown to become the largest town of East Iceland and its main service, transportation, and administration centre. The town has an airport, gymnasium, and a health clinic. The town grew quickly during the economic boom from 2004 to 2008, associated with the building of the Kárahnjúkar Hydropower Plant and Alcoa's aluminium smelting plant in Reyðarfjörður. Growth has slowed markedly since the banking collapse in 2008.

== History ==
In written accounts, Egilsstaðir is first mentioned in the 15th century as a place for a legislative assembly. Nothing is therefore known with certainty about the individual person Egil lending it their name, the only conjecture to this effect in books detailing the story of the town is that it may be named after Egil Síðu-Hallsson, but Hallr at Síða was a captain in the east and an uncle to Rollo in France, but this guess is of controlled probability and most likely the person left no other record of himself. The nearby river Eyvindará is mentioned in the Saga of the Sons of Droplaug and Saga of the inhabitants of Fljótsdalur.

Urbanization in Egilsstaðir can be traced to Jón Bergsson (1855–1923), a farmer, who laid the groundwork for increased commerce and services at the Egilsstaðir farm by erecting a large residential building at the start of the 20th century. The house is still in use as a hotel. Jón bought the farm Egilsstaðr at the close of the 19th century because of its location, he predicted "Crossroads will be here", which proved prescient. Along with others, Jón Bergsson also took the initiative to establish the co-operative Kaupfélag Héraðsbúa (KHB) with its headquarters there in 1909. In subsequent years, bridges were built over thew Lagarfljót river and Eyvindará river and a road made over Fagridalur to Reyðarfjörður. Later, the regional headquarters for mail and telephone services were located at Egilsstaðir.

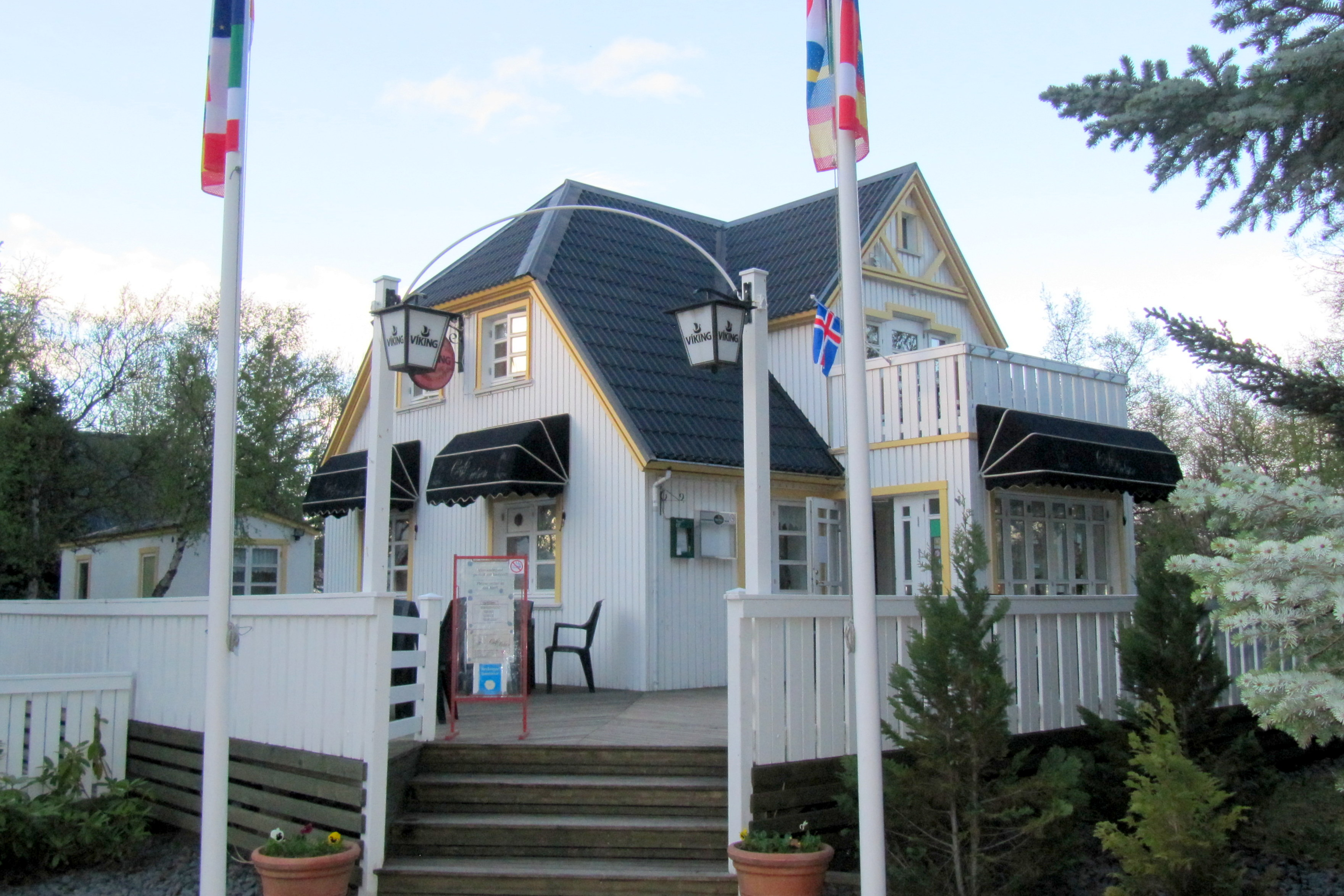
Nielsenshus, oldest private house in Egilsstaðir, built in 1944

In 1947 Egilsstaðir was incorporated as a town and a rural jurisdiction Egilsstaðahreppur, with neighbouring jurisdictions Vallahreppur and Eiðahreppur joining the new jurisdiction. The town soon grew and by 1980 the population exceeded 1000. In 1987, the status of the town was upgraded to kaupstaður and renamed Egilsstaðabær, or the town of Egilsstaðir. In early 2011, the population was 2,257 and had increased by 41 percent from 2001, when 1,600 were registered there.

On 7 June 1998 Egilsstaðabær was united with Vallahreppur, Skriðdalshreppur, Eiðahreppur and Hjaltastaðarhreppur under the name Austur-Hérað. Austur-Hérað then became Fljótsdalshérað in 2004. In 2020 it joined other municipalities to form Múlaþing.

== Climate ==
Depending on isotherm, Egilsstaðir has a subarctic climate (Köppen: Dfc) or a subpolar oceanic climate (Cfc) bordering very closely on a Tundra climate (ET). According to the precipitation averages for the most recent reference period, the climate can alternatively be classified as a rare Mediterranean-influenced subarctic climate (Dsc) or a cold-summer Mediterranean climate (Csc).

Winters tend to be colder than other towns in the area, and summers tend to have daytime highs often exceeding 15 °C (59 °F), higher than most of Iceland, but at night it is colder than most towns with a similar climate. The town being at a relatively low elevation somewhat shielded from maritime winds enables warmer air to stay for longer than in coastal areas, although the effect of southerlies become negated by high mountains blocking such winds, and as a result Egilsstaðir still has cooler summers than continental Nordic climates at a similar latitude. Egilsstaðir being relatively close to the east coast also increased the maritime moderation both in summer and winter. With Central Iceland being at a highland tundra, the Egilsstaðir area is still the warmest for 1961–1990 summer maxima among Icelandic weather stations for populated areas.

The figures here given for sunshine hours belong to Hallormsstaður, which is 25 kilometres (16 mi) away from Egilsstaðir respectively and gets around 100 millimetres (4 in) more precipitation than Egilsstaðir, so it is possible that Egilsstaðir has fewer days with precipitation and gets more sunlight than stated below. Egilsstaðir often sees the highest summer temperatures in the country, with the highest temperature recorded being 29.8 °C (85.6 °F) on 16 August 2025, at Egilsstaðir Airport. The climate has significantly warmed in recent years, as seen in the climate averages for the 1991–2020 reference period with daytime highs exceeding 20 °C (68 °F) for half of the month in July 2026.

Climate data for Egilsstaðir (1991–2020)
Month	Jan	Feb	Mar	Apr	May	Jun	Jul	Aug	Sep	Oct	Nov	Dec	Year
Record high °C (°F)	15.1 (59.2)	14.0 (57.2)	16.1 (61.0)	19.7 (67.5)	26.6 (79.9)	27.9 (82.2)	28.8 (83.8)	29.8 (85.6)	21.9 (71.4)	19.5 (67.1)	18.4 (65.1)	14.6 (58.3)	29.8 (85.6)
Mean daily maximum °C (°F)	2.7 (36.9)	2.6 (36.7)	3.5 (38.3)	5.9 (42.6)	9.9 (49.8)	13.6 (56.5)	15.4 (59.7)	15.1 (59.2)	11.9 (53.4)	6.9 (44.4)	3.8 (38.8)	2.5 (36.5)	7.8 (46.1)
Daily mean °C (°F)	−0.9 (30.4)	−1.0 (30.2)	−0.2 (31.6)	2.0 (35.6)	5.5 (41.9)	8.9 (48.0)	10.8 (51.4)	10.4 (50.7)	7.8 (46.0)	3.7 (38.7)	0.6 (33.1)	−1.1 (30.0)	3.9 (39.0)
Mean daily minimum °C (°F)	−4.9 (23.2)	−4.8 (23.4)	−4.1 (24.6)	−1.8 (28.8)	1.4 (34.5)	4.6 (40.3)	6.8 (44.2)	6.2 (43.2)	3.9 (39.0)	0.4 (32.7)	−2.8 (27.0)	−4.9 (23.2)	0.0 (32.0)
Record low °C (°F)	−24.1 (−11.4)	−22.1 (−7.8)	−26.7 (−16.1)	−21.4 (−6.5)	−10.8 (12.6)	−4.5 (23.9)	−0.9 (30.4)	−3.9 (25.0)	−6.8 (19.8)	−14.4 (6.1)	−19.4 (−2.9)	−24.3 (−11.7)	−26.7 (−16.1)
Average precipitation mm (inches)	72.5 (2.85)	51.9 (2.04)	41.6 (1.64)	30.2 (1.19)	35.1 (1.38)	27.8 (1.09)	35.1 (1.38)	43.4 (1.71)	61.2 (2.41)	85.4 (3.36)	71.2 (2.80)	68.7 (2.70)	624.1 (24.55)
Average precipitation days (≥ 1 mm)	10.5	9.2	7.4	6.8	7.3	5.6	7.6	8.2	9.8	12.6	10.5	10.8	106.3
Average relative humidity (%)	89	87	84	83	80	76	81	80	82	86	87	88	84
Mean monthly sunshine hours	0.6	33.5	84.2	142.5	182.4	187.3	172.9	145.7	86.1	46.2	6.4	0	1,087.8
Source 1: Icelandic Met Office (extremes 1955–2026)
Source 2: Icelandic Met Office (sunshine hours 1961–90 for Hallormsstaður-25 km (15 mi) from Egilsstaðir)

== Points of interest ==
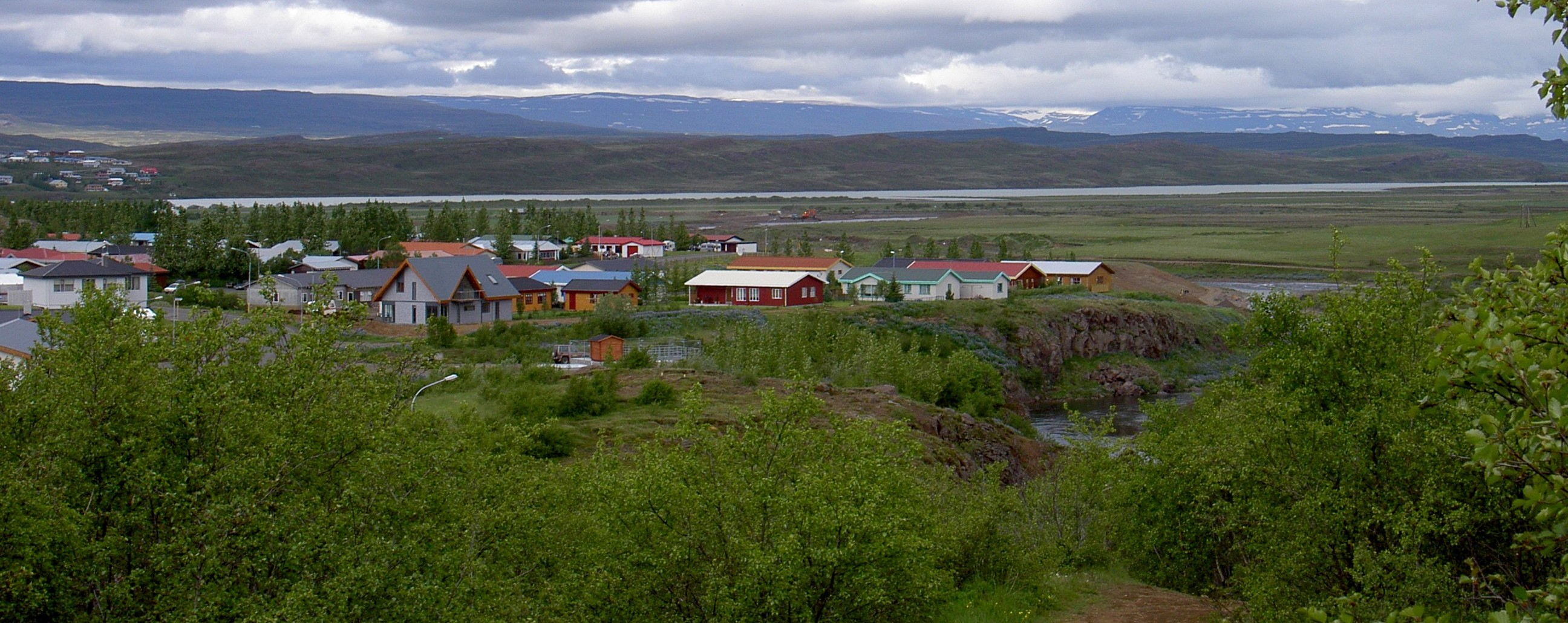
View of Egilsstaðir

- Eiðar longwave transmitter
- Kárahnjúkar Hydropower Plant
- Hallormsstaðaskógur – the biggest forest in Iceland
- Hengifoss – a waterfall in Fljótsdalur
- Skriðuklaustur – the mansion of writer Gunnar Gunnarsson
- Öxi – mountain road between Egilsstaðir and Djúpivogur

== Notable natives ==
- Sveinn Birkir Björnsson – former editor of the Reykjavík Grapevine
- Sigmar Vilhjálmsson – Iceland TV host
- Hjálmar Jónsson – Iceland national team footballer
- Vilhjálmur Einarsson, triple-jump athlete, silver medal winner at the 1956 Olympic games
- Magnús Ver Magnússon, four times World's Strongest Man (1991, 1994, 1995, and 1996)
