= Andakílsá =

Andakilsá
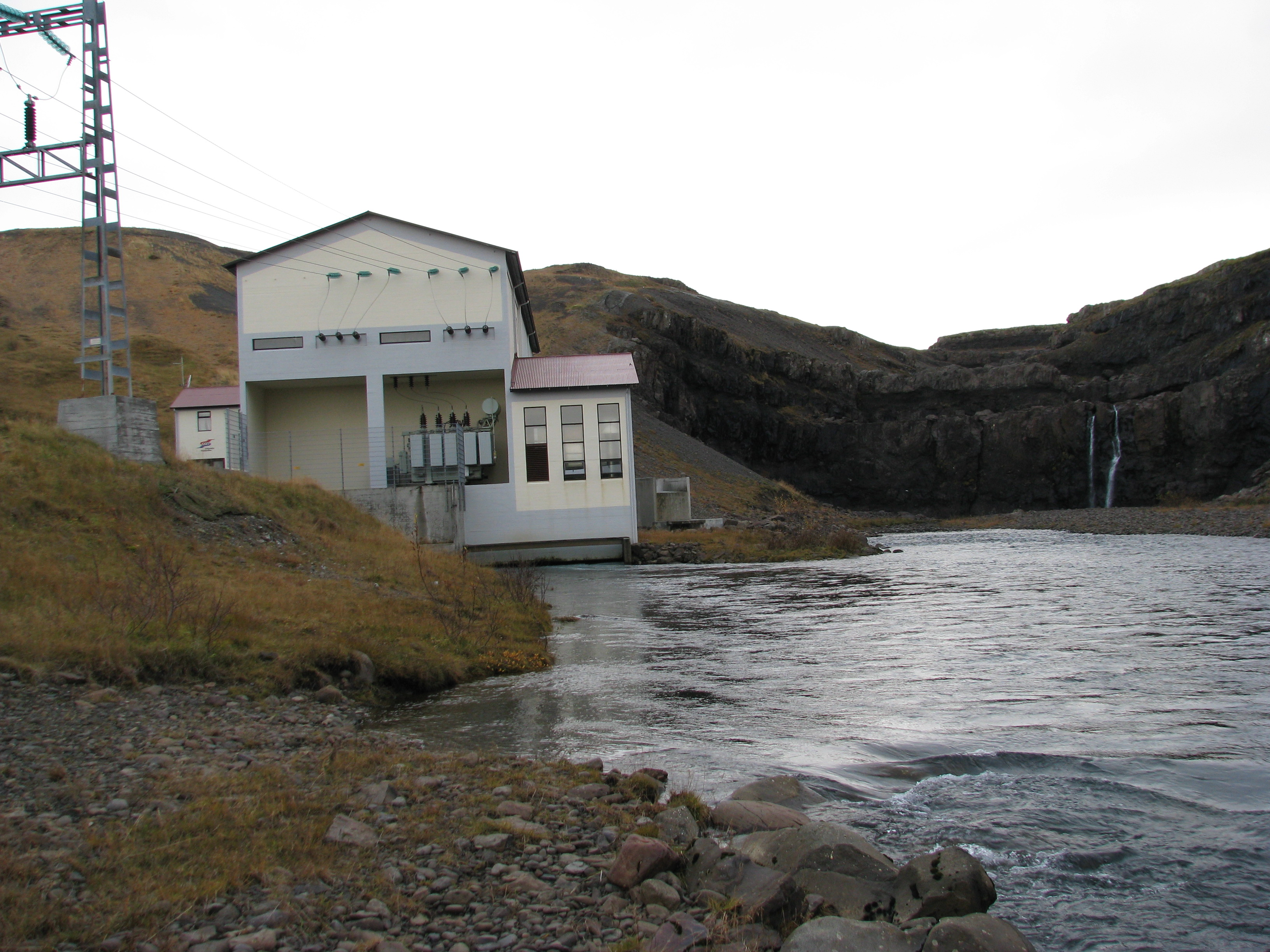
- Hydroelectric power station Andakilsvirkjun

- Location of mouth in Iceland

Location
- Country: Iceland
- Region: Vesturland

Physical characteristics
- Source
  - location: Skorradalsvatn
- Mouth
  - location: Borgarfjörður
  - coordinates: 64°32′07″N 21°46′50″W

Andakilsá (Icelandic pronunciation: [ˈantaˌcʰilsˌauː]) is a river in West Iceland (Vesturland).

The river has its origin in Skorradalsvatn lake. Three small rivers flow from the direction of the Skarðsheiði mountain massif into Andakilsá on its way to the sea, the Borgarfjörður. Summer discharge of Andakilsá is 3-13 m3/sec., winter discharge 5-22 m3/sec.

== Salmon river ==
Salmon angling is often practised in Andakilsá though the fish can just mount about 5 km and not further as to the hydroelectric power station. Trout angling is also possible near the bridge

== Hydroelectric power station Andakilsvirkjun ==
Some waterfalls, the Andakilsárfossar, have more or less disappeared after construction of a 8 MW hydroelectric power station in 1946–47.

In 2017, it was decided to empty the small reservoir next to the power station. But a big amount of sediment accompanied the water and it was feared for the salmon.

== Road No. 50 ==
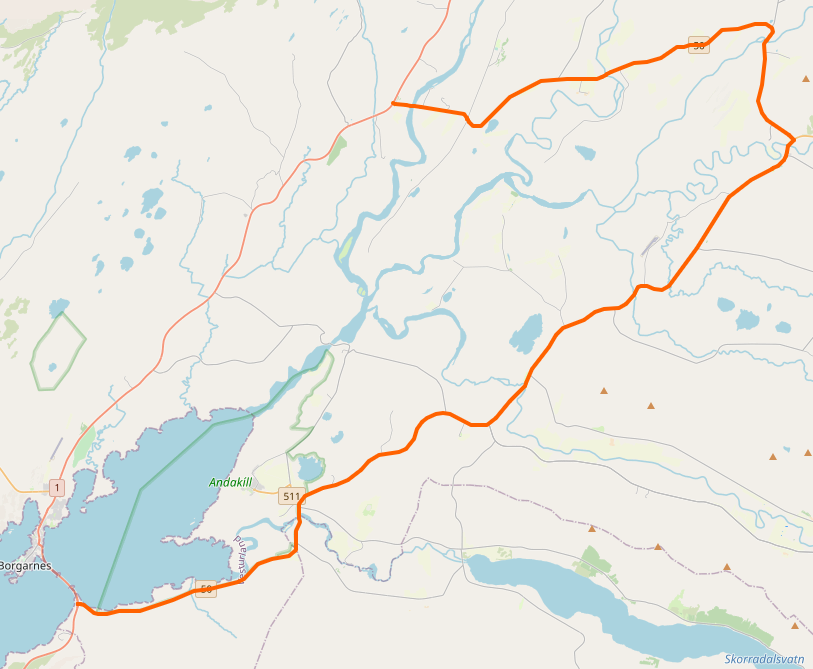
Road 50, Iceland; the river is shown at the bottom of the map connecting the lake with the fjord

The Road No. 50 crosses the river Andakilsá on a bridge near the coast of Borgarfjörður.
