= Borgarfjarðarhreppur =

- Former municipality
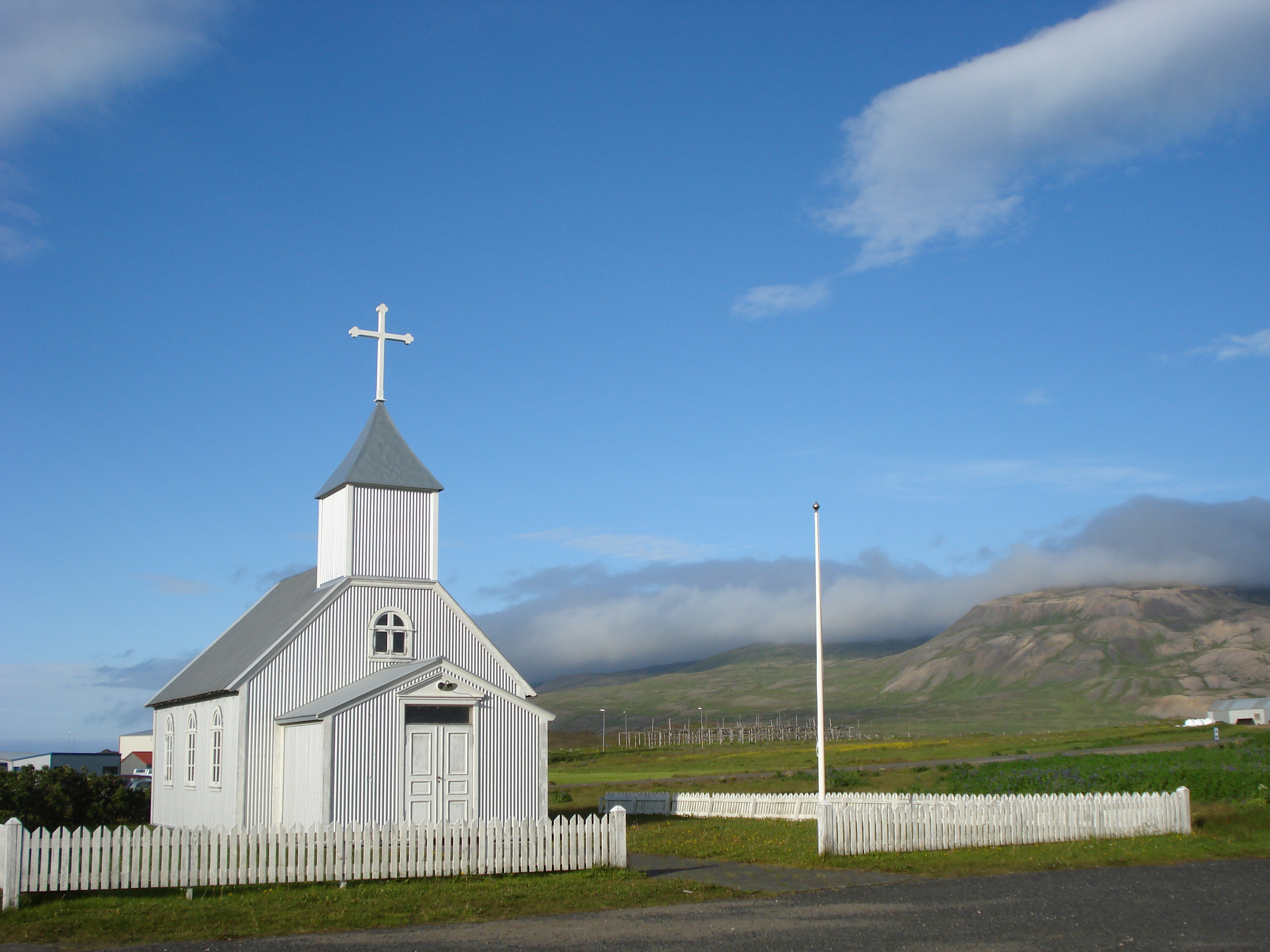
- Skyline of Borgarfjarðarhreppur

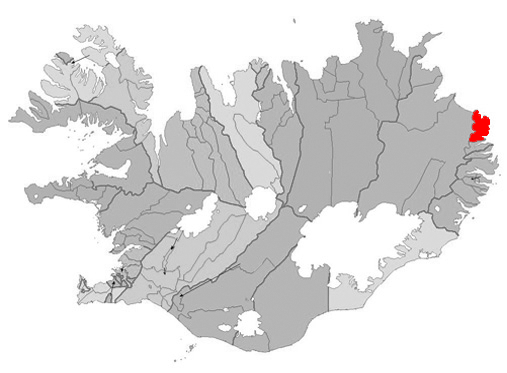
- Location of Borgarfjarðarhreppur

- Location within Iceland
- Coordinates: 65°31′34″N 13°48′44″W
- Country: Iceland
- Region: Eastern Region
- Constituency: Northeast Constituency
- Municipality: Múlaþing

Government
  - Manager: Jón Þórðarson

Area
  - Total: 441 km^{2} (170 sq mi)

Population
  - Total: 134
  - Density: 0.3/km^{2} (0.78/sq mi)
- Postal code(s): 720
- Website: borgarfjordureystri.is

Borgarfjarðarhreppur (Icelandic pronunciation: [ˈpɔrkarˌfjarðar̥ˌr̥ɛhpʏr̥]) is a former municipality in Iceland. In 2020 it merged with Djúpavogshreppur, Fljótsdalshérað, and Seyðisfjarðarkaupstaður to form the municipality of Múlaþing. Its main settlement is Bakkagerði. It is located in the Austurland region, in the eastern part of the country, 400 km east of Reykjavík, the country's capital. The average temperature is −2 °C. The warmest month is July, at 9 °C, and the coldest month is February, at −8 °C.
