= Hallormsstaðaskógur =

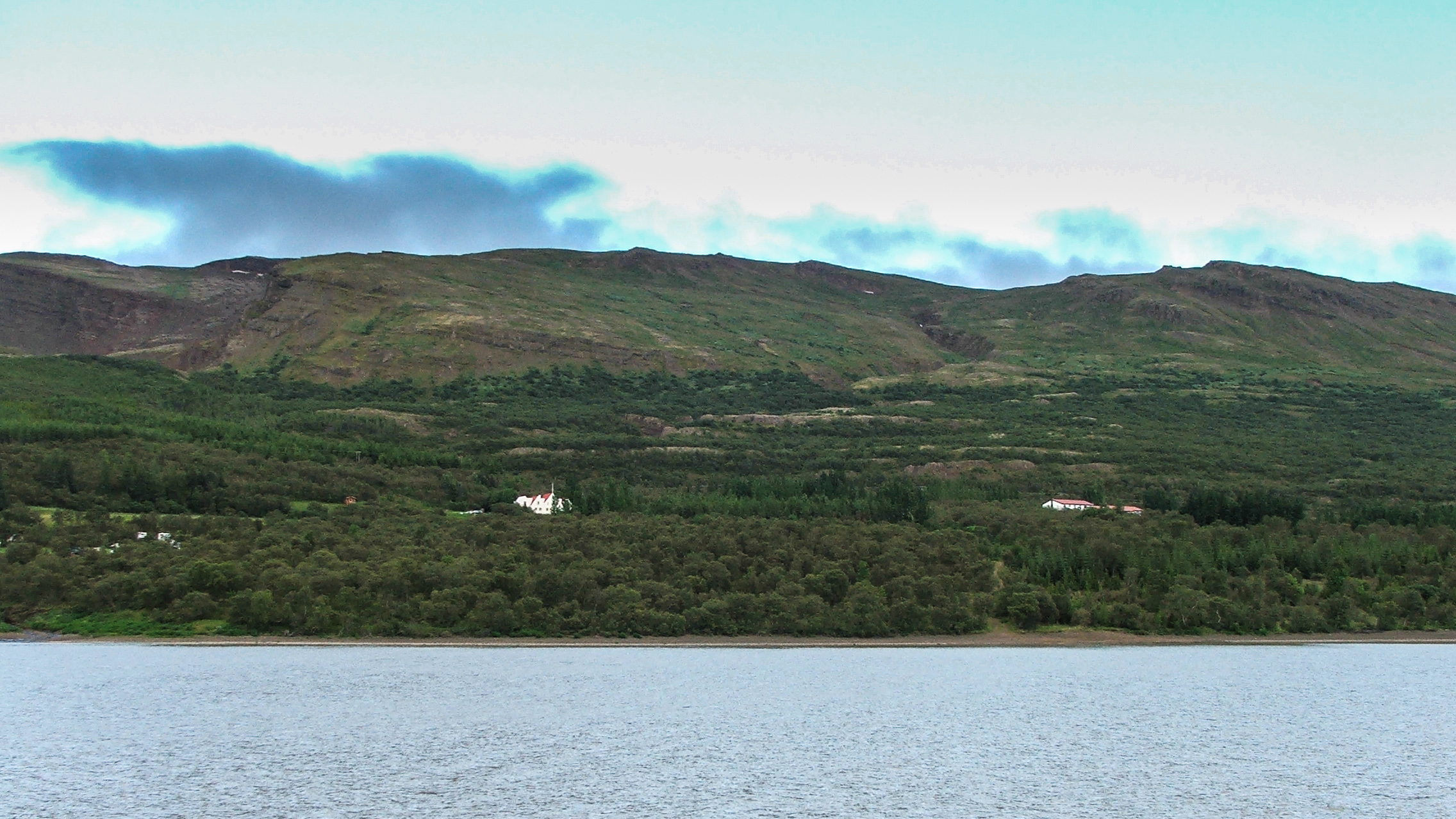
- View to Hallormsstaðaskógur National Forest
- Interactive map of Hallormsstaðaskógur
- Coordinates: 65°05′36″N 14°44′50″W
- Country: Iceland
- County: Norður-Múlasýsla
- Municipality: Múlaþing

Area
  - Total: 7.4 km^{2} (2.9 sq mi)
- Elevation: 65 m (213 ft)

Hallormsstaður National Forest (Icelandic: Hallormsstaðaskógur; Icelandic pronunciation: [-ˌstaːðaˌskouː(ɣ)ʏr̥]) is located in Fljótsdalur of east Iceland, about 25 km (16 mi) inland from the town of Egilsstaðir. It is one of the larger forests in Iceland, covering 740 ha (1,800 acres) and includes Hallormsstaður (Icelandic pronunciation: [ˈhatlˌɔ(r)msˌstaːðʏr̥]), the only village in Iceland that is located in a forest.

The forest is a recreation area in a varied landscape. There are over 40 km (25 mi) of marked trails and footpaths as well as an arboretum, two camp-sites, picnic areas, a hotel, and boat and horse rentals.

== History ==
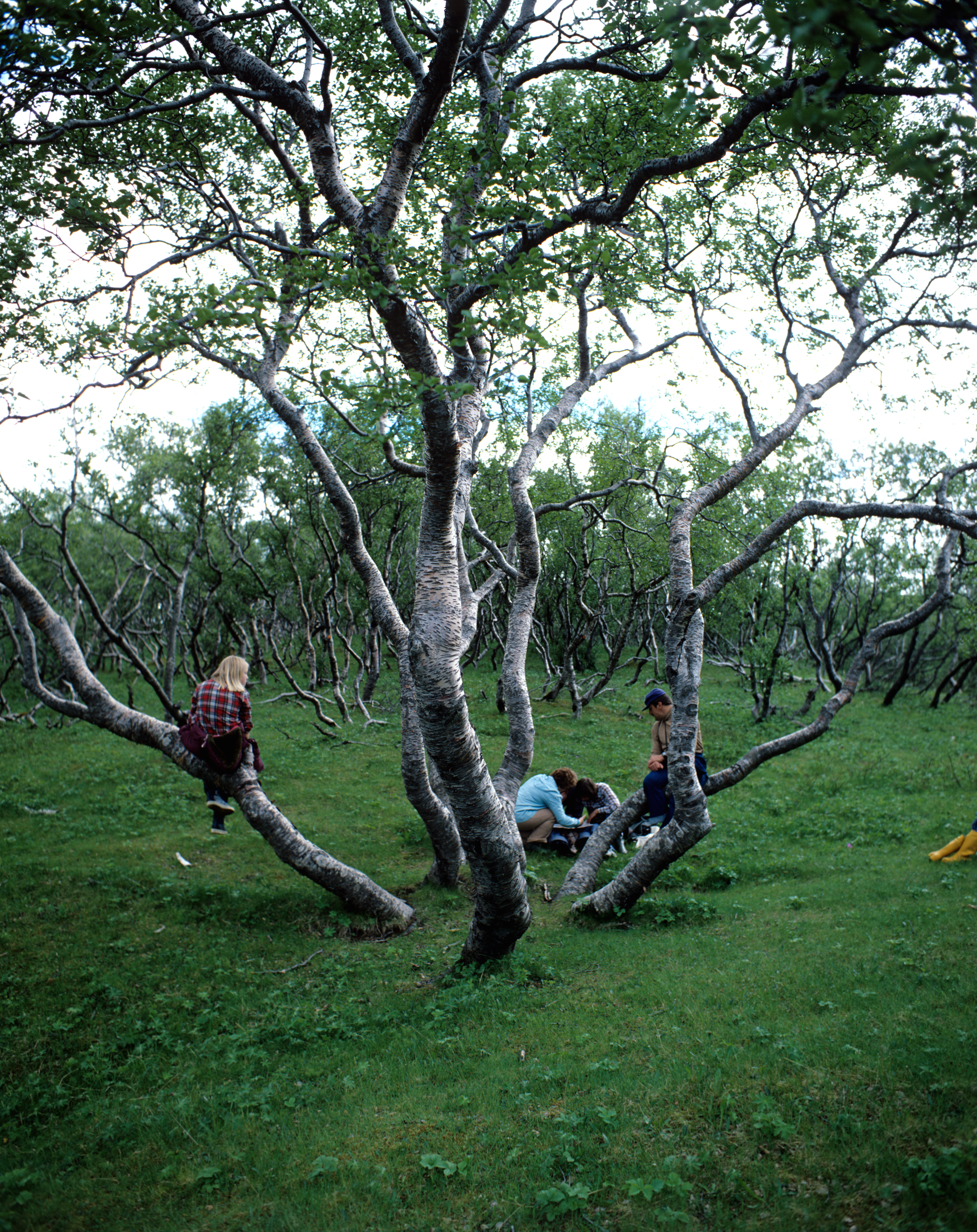
Seven Sisters Tree in 1975

The birchwood remnants at Hallormsstaðabær (transl. Hallormsstaður farm) were protected in 1905 and thereby became Iceland's first national forest. Birch forest and woodland now cover about 350 ha (860 acres) within the original fenced area and a variety of tree species have been planted on another 200 ha (490 acres). Large areas have been annexed to the forest more recently, both to the north and south, and either planted or allowed to regenerate naturally with birch. A total of 85 tree species can be found in the forest from over 600 places around the world.

== Nature ==
The forest provides food, nest sites and protection from predators for several bird species. Year-round residents include common redpoll, wren, goldcrest, rock ptarmigan, and common raven. In summer the forest fills with redwings, snipes and meadow pipits along with Eurasian woodcocks and wagtails. Besides birding, the forest offers opportunities for botanizing and picking berries and mushrooms. Edible mushrooms include larch bolete, birch bolete, and slippery jack. Rock bramble is common and raspberries and redcurrants can be found in parts of the forest. Clear streams form a characteristic part of the forest, and the water in all of them is drinkable.

=== Hiking trails ===
Yellow trail; The Part
Distance: 3 km (1.9 mi)
The trail starts at the car park by the road at Hafursá stream and leads up a gravel road, then under and along a power line.

Blue trail; The Knolls
5 km (3.1 mi)
The trail leads up from the old home economics school (now a guest house in summer), past a rock outcrop called the Old Woman and north through the forest. It goes through the Flat Forest, which is a tall (by Icelandic standards) birch forest and thence to Falcon Cliffs, which provides a view over the forest. Then, down through a spruce forest to an open area that was once the farm Ormsstaðir, from where the trail leads back to the start.

Orange trail; Hallormsstaður Moors
Distance: 7 km (4.3 mi)
An easily followed and relatively easily hiked trail between Hallormsstaðaskógur and the farm Geirólfsstaðir in the next valley to the east. The trail is the same as the blue trail to begin with, then along the old horse trails under the cliffs above the forest and up onto the moors. The trail provides mountain vistas on a clear day.

Brown trail; Road Forest
Distance: 2 km (1.2 mi)
The trail starts at the north end of the camp-ground Höfðavík, below the main road and along Lagarfljót river through a forest of old birches. This is the forest that was here in 1905.

Light blue trail; Atlavík Campground – Arboretum – Shop
Distance: 1.5 km (0.93 mi)
The trail leads up a steep slope from the campground at Atlavík and along a footpath to the arboretum. From the arboretum, a footpath leads to the shop by the road. You can also walk across the Höfðavík campground to the brown trail.

Light green trail; Hallormsstaður Cliffs
Distance: 4 km (2.5 mi)
The trail is the same as the orange trail up to the cliffs but then turns right instead of left and passes under the cliffs and back. The trail traverses the big rock slide that much of the forest grows on.

White trail; The Strain (Remba)
Distance: 1.8 km (1.1 mi)
Remba (transl. the Strain), is an old trail over the mountain to the next valley and was considered rather difficult. The trail starts at the gymnasium and is fairly steep to begin with. It leads up to the Chest Cliffs and then to the 21 m (69 ft) high Lamb waterfall. A little farther up the stream, you come to a dam that provided water to a 27 kW hydropower plant that was operated from 1936 to 1955. Caution is required as the trail passes along the edge of a small canyon. The trail then leads back the same way.

Red train; Atlavík Corral
Distance: 1.5 km (0.93 mi)
The trail starts at the main road, leads through a larch stand planted in 1937 with 20 m (66 ft) tall trees and past the ruins of a Viking-age horse corral. The trail passes through more older stands of trees, including lodgepole pine and Douglas fir planted in 1940 and exceptionally straight larch from 1957. The trail winds on through the forest and finally down to the road across from the arboretum.

Brown trail; Glacier Stream
Distance: 200 m (660 ft)
A short footpath from the main road up to a mini arboretum that includes Norway spruce and mountain pine planted in 1908 and a variety of species planted in 1963, including: subalpine fir, Engelmann spruce, western hemlock, white spruce, Douglas fir, dragon spruce, lodgepole pine and western red cedar. Unusually good (for Iceland) Scots pine grows along the path.

Yellow trail; Light River Slope
Distance: 850 m (2,790 ft)
The trail leads up a forest road, through stands of Siberian stone pine, lodgepole pine and white spruce to the 16 m (52 ft) high Ljósárfoss (lit. 'Light river waterfall'). On the north side of the trail is some of the straightest growing larch in the forest.

== Icelandic National Forests ==
Lands managed by the Icelandic Forest Service (Icelandic: Skógrækt ríkisins, Skógræktin) are called National Forests. They are open to everyone, year round, and are located in all parts of Iceland. Many are easy to reach and have a variety of facilities for outdoor recreation. Others require a 4-wheel drive vehicle or hiking up steep hillsides in order to access them.

== Bibliography ==
- Hjörleifur Guttormsson; Sigurður Blöndal; Guðný Zoëga (2005). Hallormsstaður í skógum; náttúra og saga höfuðbóls og þjóðskógar [Hallormsstaður in the forest; nature and the history of a manor and a national forest] (in Icelandic). Reykjavík: Mál og menning. ISBN 9979-3-2658-1.
- Rúnar Snær Reynisson (8 April 2025). "Lerkið æðir af stað í hlýindum og gæti skemmst ef frystir" [The larch thrives in the heat and could be damaged if it freezes]. RÚV (in Icelandic). Archived from the original on 15 April 2025.
