= Borgarfjörður eystri =

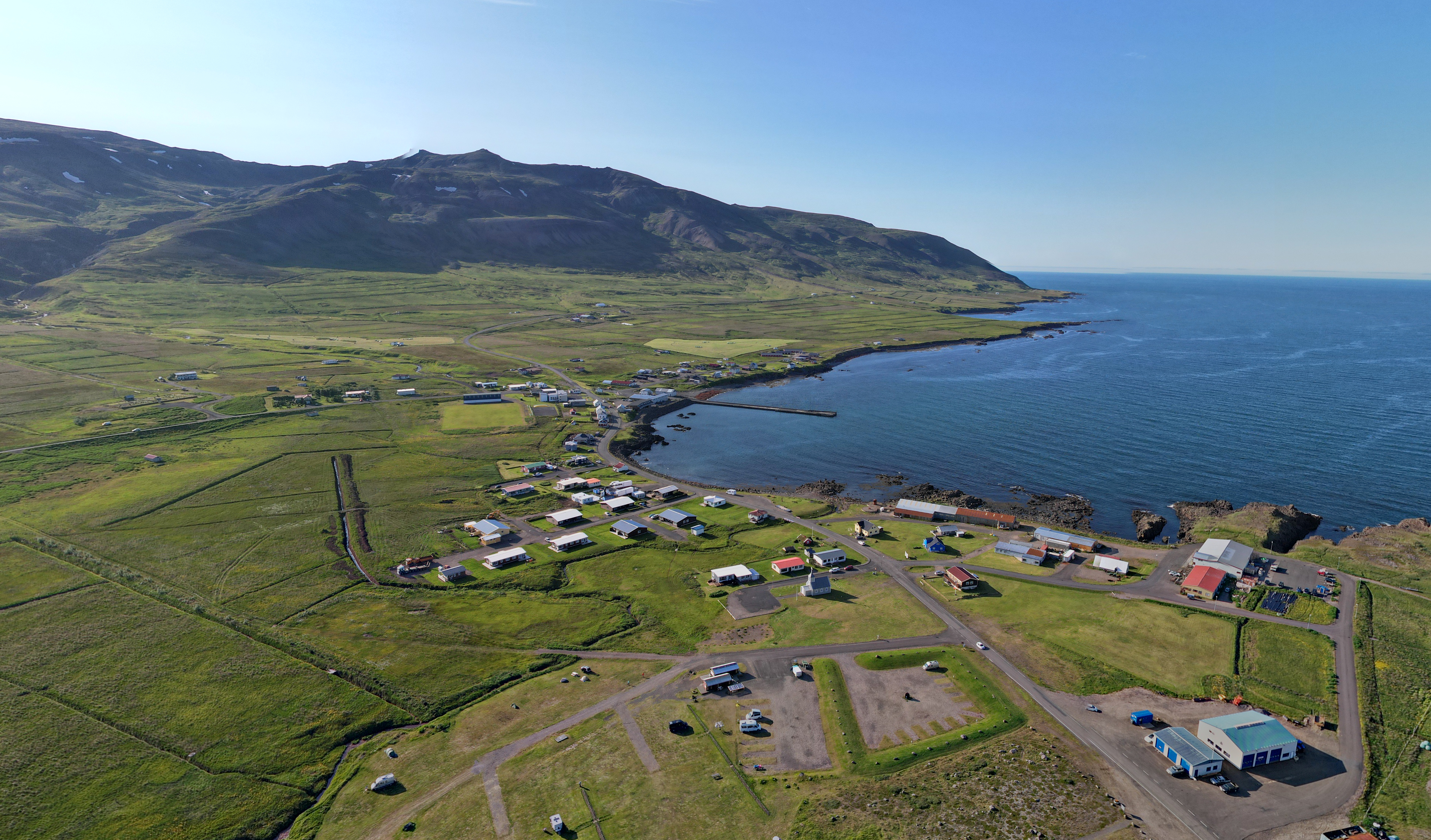
- Bakkagerði in Borgarfjörður

- Location of the Municipality of Múlaþing

- Location in Iceland
- Coordinates: 65°32′N 13°46′W
- Country: Iceland
- Constituency: Northeast Constituency
- Region: Eastern Region
- Municipality: Múlaþing

Population (2024)
  - Total: 91
- Time zone: UTC+0 (GMT)
- Website: Official website

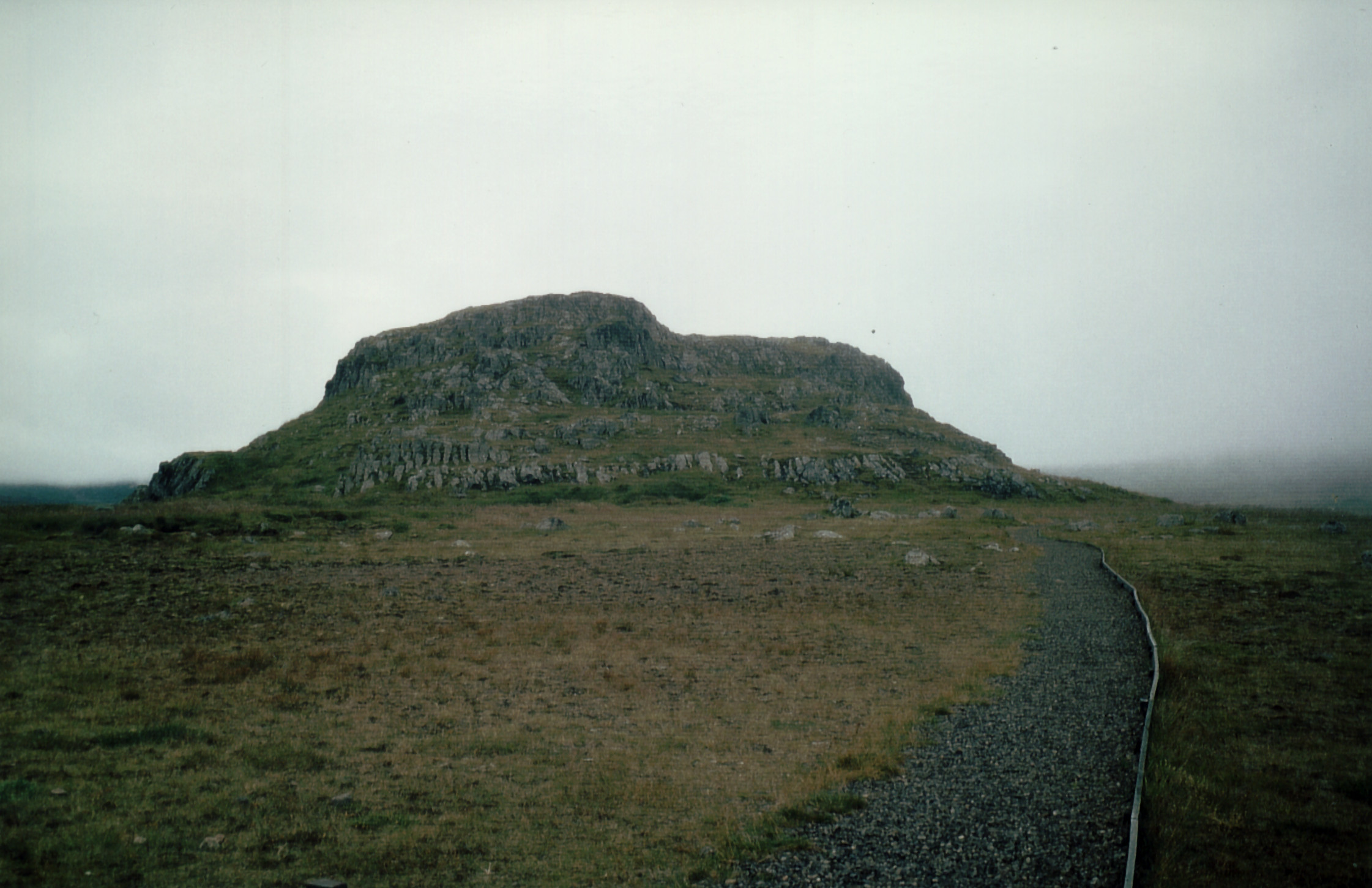
Álfaborg, Iceland

Borgarfjörður eystri (Note: Eystri meaning "more eastern" to discern it from Borgarfjörður in the west of Iceland.) (Icelandic pronunciation: [ˈpɔrkarˌfjœrðʏr ˈeistrɪ]) is a fjord in east Iceland.

It is part of the municipality of Múlaþing and, as of 2024, the area has a population of 91 inhabitants. The main settlement is Bakkagerði.

The town derives its name from the Álfaborg (Elf Rock). Some of the locals believe that the queen of the elves lives in the Álfaborg. The main attraction for visitors is hiking. Borgarfjörður eystri is also home to a large puffin colony. Since 2004, a music festival has been put on in the summer, and attracted over 2,000 visitors in the summer of 2009.

A church in Borgarfjörður eystri has a painting by Jóhannes Sveinsson Kjarval that depicts Jesus on the cross on an elf hill. The local bishop has refused to bless the painting because of this. Kjarvalsstofa is a museum in Bakkagerði dedicated to the painter who grew up in the area.

The film Heartstone was shot in Borgarfjörður eystri.
