= Fljótsdalur =

Valley in eastern Iceland

Coordinates: 64°50′N 15°30′W

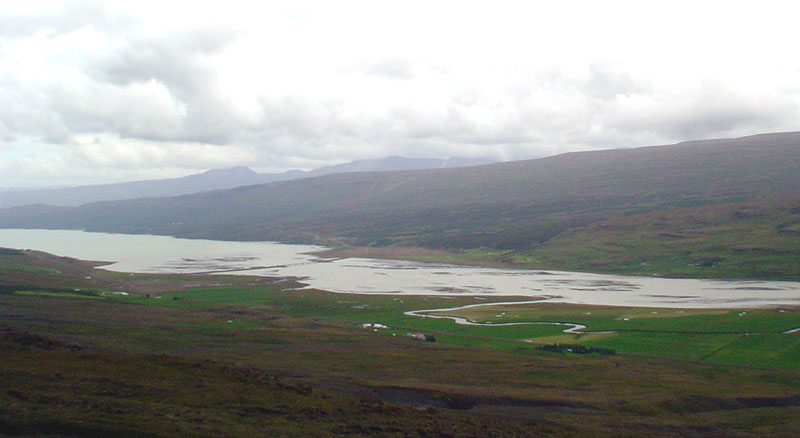
Fljótsdalur

Fljótsdalur (Icelandic pronunciation: [ˈfljoutsˌtaːlʏr̥]) is a valley in east Iceland, formed by the Lagarfljót River. Lake Lagarfljót and the city of Egilsstaðir are north of the valley.

The most known places are Skriðuklaustur, Valþjófsstaður and the waterfalls Hengifoss, Strútsfoss and Kirkjufoss.

== See also ==
- Hallormsstaður
- Localities of Iceland
