= Gunnar Gunnarsson =

Icelandic author (1889–1975)

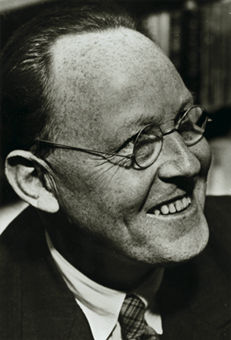
Gunnar Gunnarsson

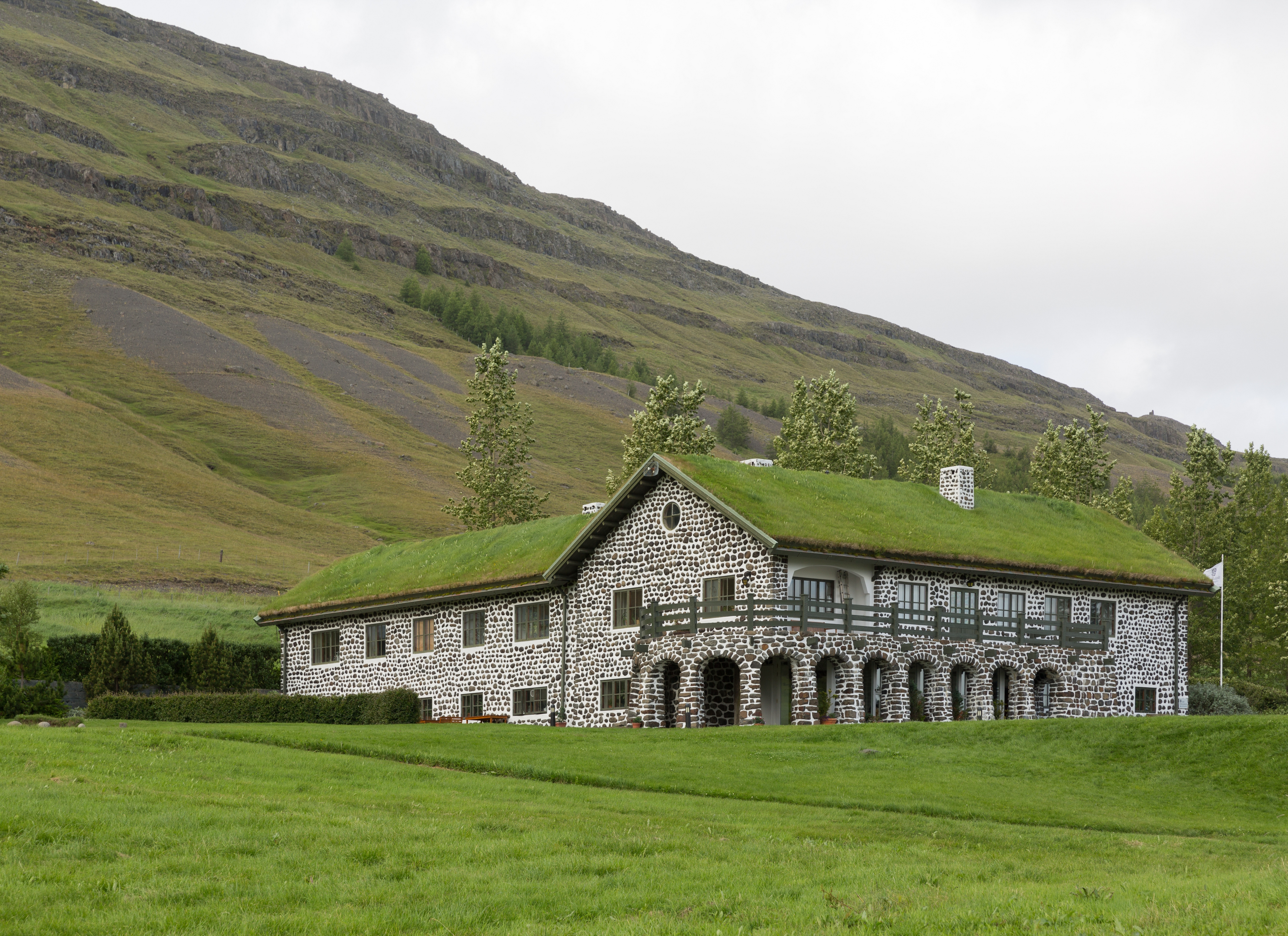
Gunnar Gunnarsson's house named Skriðuklaustur.

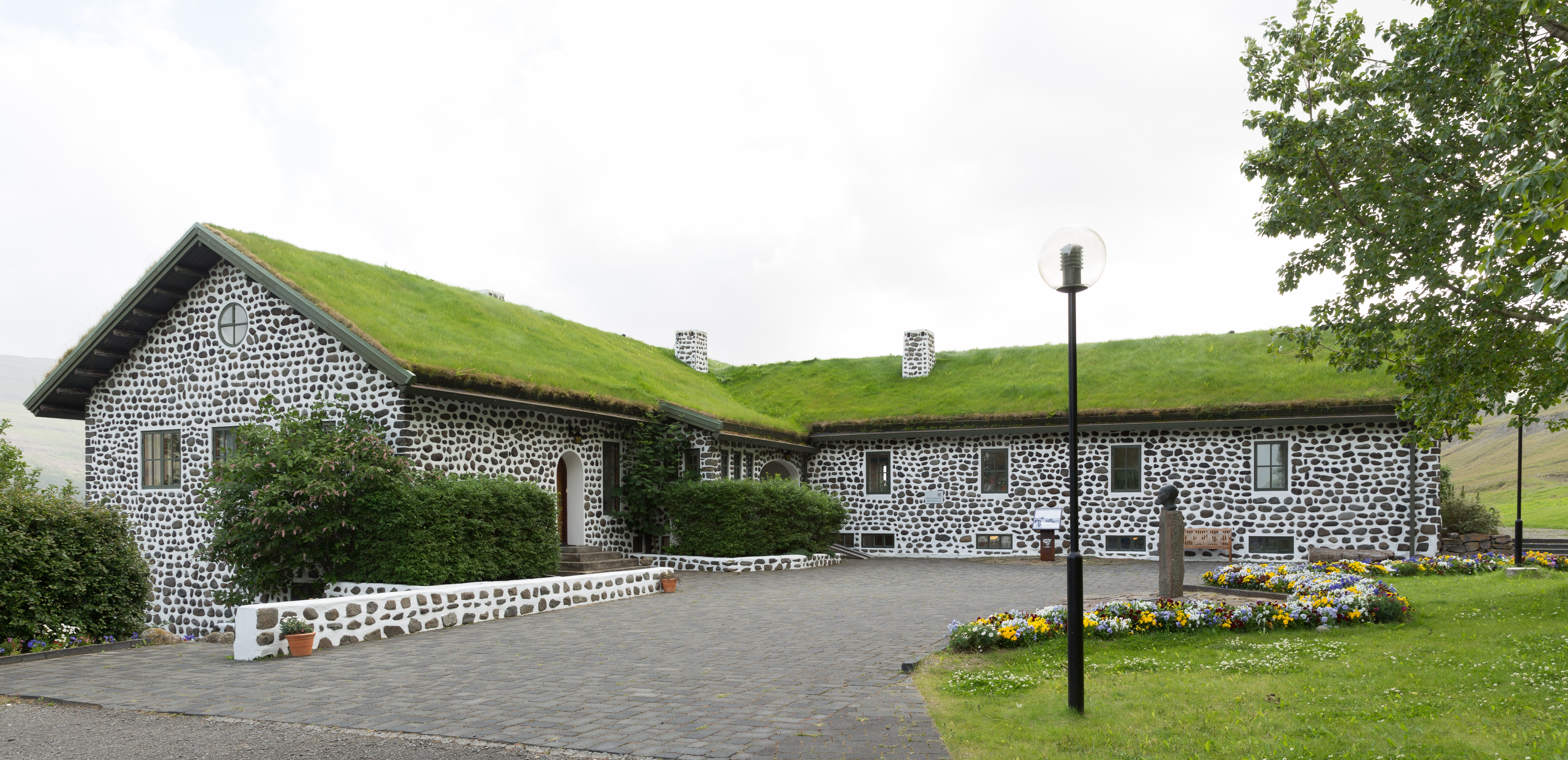
Skriðuklaustur.

Gunnar Gunnarsson (18 May 1889 – 21 November 1975) was an Icelandic author who wrote mainly in Danish. He was born in Fljótsdalur and died in Reykjavík.

He grew up, in considerable poverty, on Valþjófsstaður in Fljótsdalur valley and on Ljótsstaðir in Vopnafjörður. During the first half of 20th century he became one of the most popular novelists in Denmark and Germany. One time he went to Germany and had a meeting with Hitler and is considered to be the only Icelander to have met him.

Often considered one of the most important Icelandic writers, he wrote the novel Af Borgslægtens Historie (translated into English as Guest the One-Eyed), the first Icelandic writing ever made into a movie. He also wrote the autobiographical novel The Church on the Mountain (1923–28).

== Background ==
Gunnar lost his mother at an early age. Until the age of 18, he worked at the family farm and received his education attending small rural schools.

He started early writing poetry and short stories, and published his first books of poems at the age of 17. His family was too poor to provide him with traditional school education, but in 1907 he was finally able to enroll in the Askov Højskole, a Folk High School in Denmark. During the two years he spent there, he became determined to work as a writer. He also decided to write in Danish in order to reach a wider audience.

After several difficult years, Gunnar published his first novel in 1912, the first volume of Af Borgslægtens Historie (translated into English as Guest the One-Eyed). The second and third volumes were published the following year, the third one becoming a huge success in Denmark, and making his name as a writer. Four volumes appeared in this melodramatic epic relating the story of three generations of Icelandic farmers. Using the Cain and Abel theme, this is the story of two brothers, one of whom is a dreamer forced to choose between his creative longings and duty, while the other is evil incarnated in the first two volumes, but returns as the saint-like Guest the One-Eyed in the third, having atoned for his sins through service to others.

World War I brought a streak of pessimism into Gunnar's writings. Between 1920 and 1940 he published a number of essays on political and social issues, as well as on Nordic co-operation. He also gave numerous lectures in the Nordic countries and in Germany.

In 1939, Gunnar moved back to Iceland and first settled on Skriðuklaustur, a farm in East Iceland, where he built a house designed by German architect Fritz Höger. The house was later donated to the Icelandic state and turned into a museum in the memory of the writer. In 1940 Gunnar travelled war-time Germany in an extensive lecture tour, also meeting with Adolf Hitler. In 1948 Gunnar moved to Reykjavík, where he started translating his own works into Icelandic. This task was almost completed before his death in 1975.

Gunnar's books have been translated into many languages. His best-known works, after Guest the One-Eyed, include The Good Shepherd, and The Black Cliffs. He was an admirer of the Icelandic sagas and translated Grettis saga into Danish.

In 1911 Gunnar published Digte, a collection of poetry dedicated to his lifelong love and companion, Franzisca Antonia Josephine Jørgensen. They were married in 1912. Franzisca Gunnarsson died a year after her husband, and they were both buried in the island of Viðey near Reykjavík, which used to belong to a Catholic church. Gunnar was born and raised a Lutheran Protestant, but his wife was a Catholic.

== Gunnar Gunnarsson Institute ==
The farm and houses at Skriðuklaustur were donated by the Gunnarssons to the Icelandic state in 1948. After a thorough renovation, the newly founded Gunnarsson Institute was installed in the buildings at Skriðuklaustur in 1997. Its role is to support literary endeavours, with an emphasis on the work of Gunnar Gunnarsson, and to run a residence for artists, writers and scholars. The institute also contributes more generally to the development of the economy in East Iceland.

During the late Middle Ages, Skriðuklaustur was the site of a monastery. This is now the subject of an archaeological excavation that started in 2002 and was scheduled to be completed in 2007.

== Nobel Prize nomination ==
Gunnar Gunnarsson was considered for the Nobel Prize in Literature in 1918, 1921, 1922, 1955, 1960, and 1961 with 1955 the year he had the most nominations. In 1955, a shared Nobel Prize in Literature between Gunnarsson and the chosen winner Halldór Laxness was considered by the Swedish Academy's Nobel committee.

== Bibliography ==
=== In Danish ===
- Digte (1911)
- Ormarr Ørlygsson. Af Borgslægtens Historie (1912)
- Gæst den enøjede. Af Borgslægtens Historie (1913)
- Den danske frue på Hof. Af Borgslægtens Historie (1913)
- Den unge Ørn. Af Borgslægtens Historie (1914)
- Livets Strand (1915)
- Varg i Veum (1916)
- Drengen (1917)
- Små Skuespil (1917)
- Små Historier (1918)
- Edbrødre (1918)
- Salige er de enfoldige (1920)
- Ringen (1921)
- Dyret med glorien (1922)
- Små historier (1922)
- Den glade gård (1923)
- Leg med strå (1923)
- Skibe på himlen (1925)
- Natten og drømmen (1926)
- Det nordiske rige (1927)
- Den uerfarne rejsende (1927)
- Hugleik den hårdtseljende (1928)
- Svartfugl (1929)
- Island (1929)
- En dag tilovers (1929)
- Jón Arason (1930)
- Rævepelsene (1930)
- Verdens Glæder (1931)
- Vikivaki (1932)
- De blindes Hus (1933)
- Jord (1933)
- Hvide-Krist (1934)
- Sagaøen (1935)
- Gråmand (1936)
- Advent (1937)
- Trylle og andet Smaakram (1939)
- Brandur på Bjarg (1942)
- Sjælemesse (1953)
- Sonate ved havet (1955)

=== In English ===
- Advent (1939)
- The Black Cliffs (1967)
- Guest the One-Eyed (1920)
- The Good Shepherd (1940)
- The Night and the Dream (1938)
- Seven Days' Darkness (1930)
- Ships of the Sky (1938)
- The Sworn Brothers (1921)
- Trylle and Other Small Fry (1947)
