= Lagarfljót =

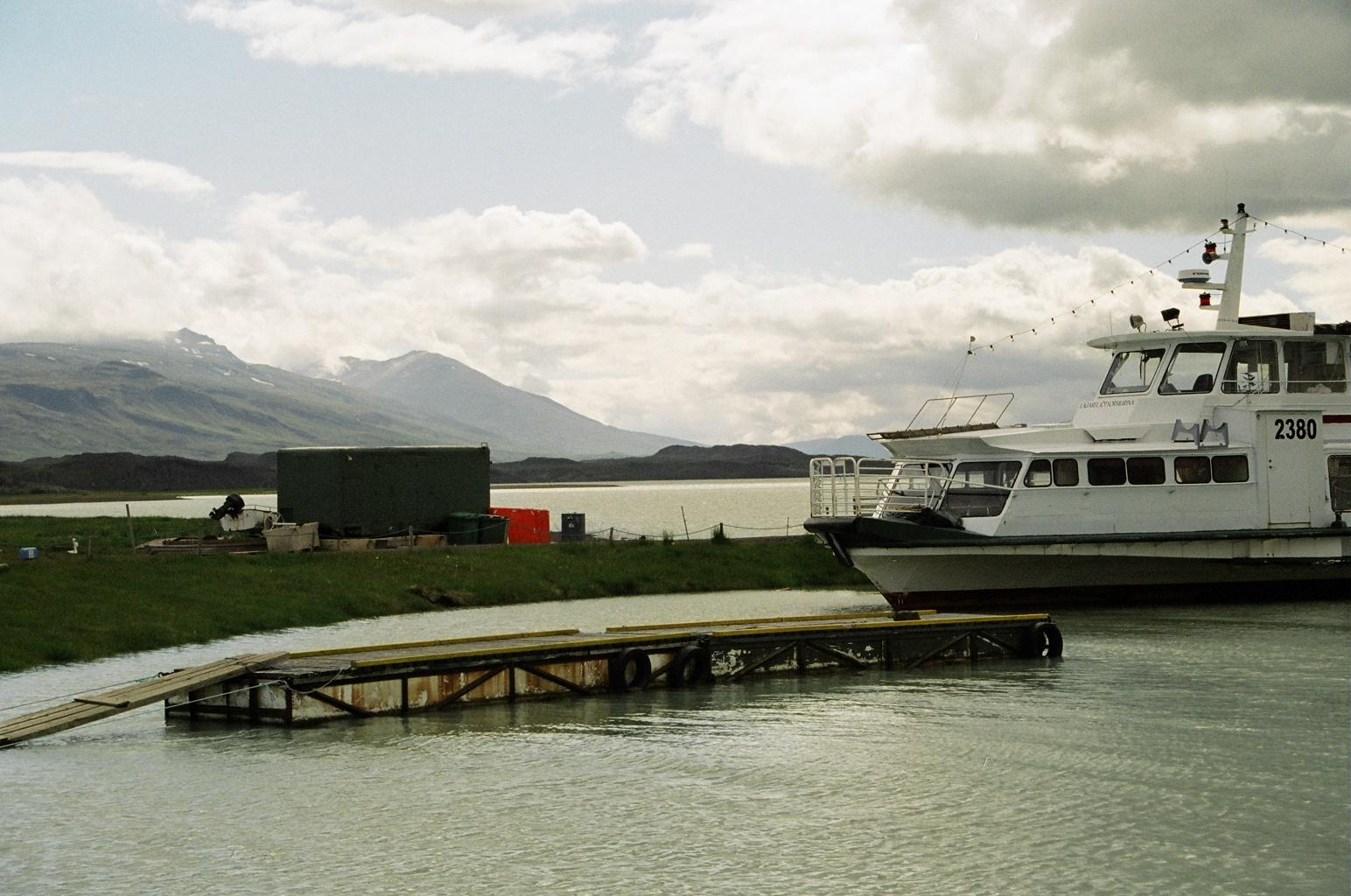
- Lagarfljót at Orurinn

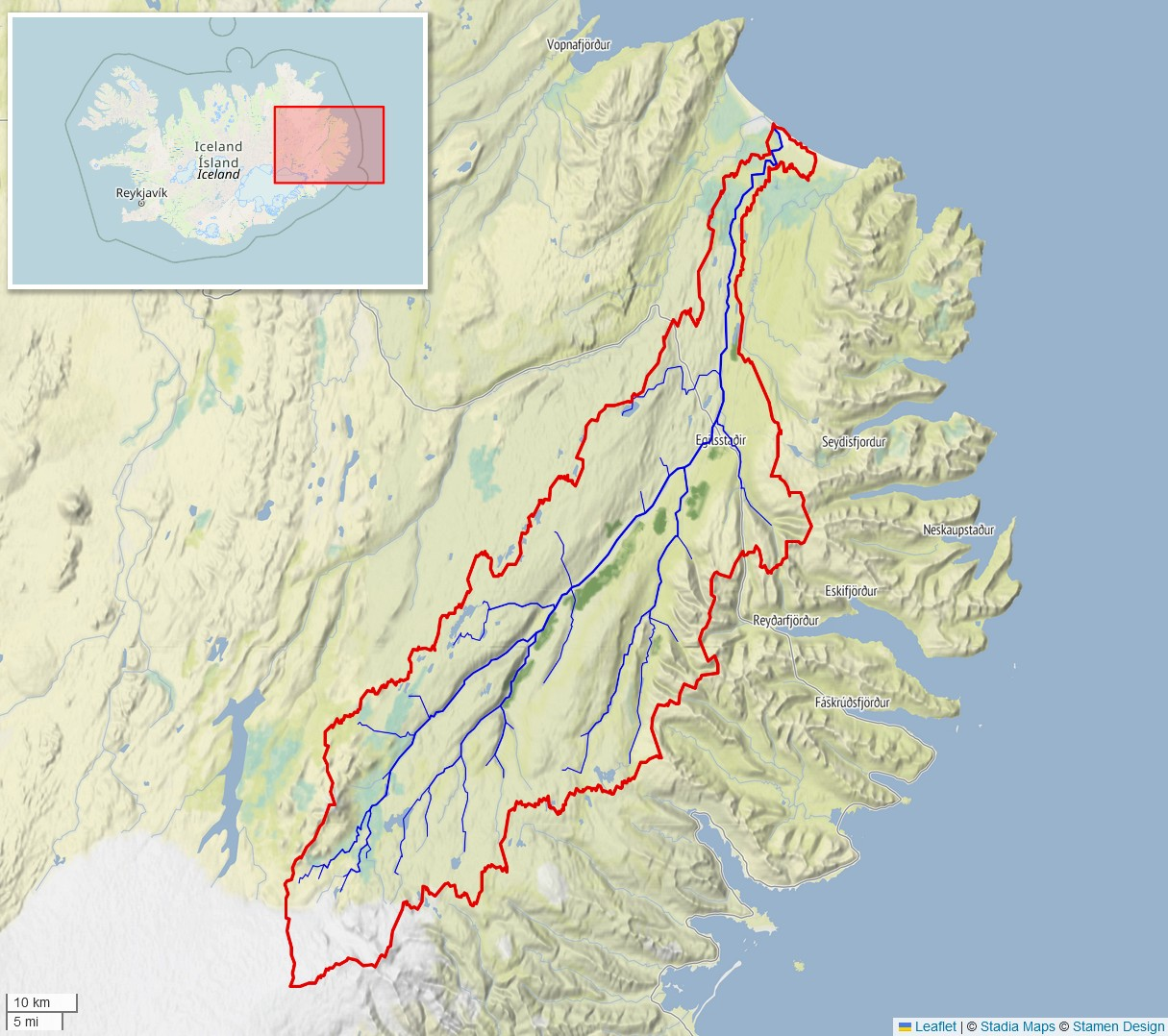
- Lagarfljót watershed (Interactive map)

Physical characteristics
- Mouth
  - location: Atlantic Ocean
  - coordinates: 65.652°N 14.248°W
  - elevation: 0 m
- Length: 150 km
- Basin size: 2920 km²

Lagarfljót (Icelandic pronunciation: [ˈlaːɣarˌfljouːt]) also called Fljótið [ˈfljouːtɪθ] is a river situated in the east of Iceland near Egilsstaðir. Its surface measures 53 square kilometres (20 sq mi) and it is 25 kilometres (16 mi) long; its greatest width is 2.5 km (1.6 mi) and its greatest depth 112 m (367 ft). The 27 MW Lagarfossvirkjun hydropower station is located at its lower end.

The biggest forest in Iceland, Hallormsstaðaskógur is found near the river as well as a waterfall, Hengifoss. Hengifoss, at 128 m (420 ft), is one of the tallest waterfalls in the country. Below it is another waterfall called Litlanesfoss.

As with the Scottish lake Loch Ness, a cryptid serpent, called Lagarfljótsormurinn by locals, is believed by some to live in the depths of Lagarfljót.

== See also ==
- List of rivers of Iceland
- Waterfalls of Iceland
