= Múlaþing =

- Municipality
- Location of Múlaþing

- Location within Iceland
- Country: Iceland
- Region: Eastern
- Constituency: Northeast
- Established: 2020

Government
  - Mayor: Björn Ingimarsson

Area
  - Total: 10,671 km^{2} (4,120 sq mi)

Population (2020)
  - Total: 5,000
  - Density: 0.47/km^{2} (1.2/sq mi)
- Postal code(s): 700-710, 720, 765
- Municipal number: 7400
- Website: www.mulathing.is

Múlaþing (Icelandic pronunciation: [ˈmuːlaˌθiŋk]) is a municipality in the east Iceland, and was formed in 2020 from the merger of Fljótsdalshérað, Seyðisfjörður, Borgarfjarðarhreppur and Djúpavogshreppur.

It is the second largest municipality in the country by area (the largest being Þingeyjarsveit). The biggest town in the municipality is Egilsstaðir, with a population of around 2,500. The second largest town of Seyðisfjörður is one of the oldest towns in Iceland.

The feral reindeer of Iceland are mostly situated in Fljótsdalshérað, where they number between 5,000 and 10,000. The largest forest in Iceland, Hallormsstaðaskógur, is also located in Fljótsdalshérað and surrounds the Hallormsstaður village.

The Kárahnjúkar Hydropower Plant is located in the municipality.
