= Skorradalsvatn =

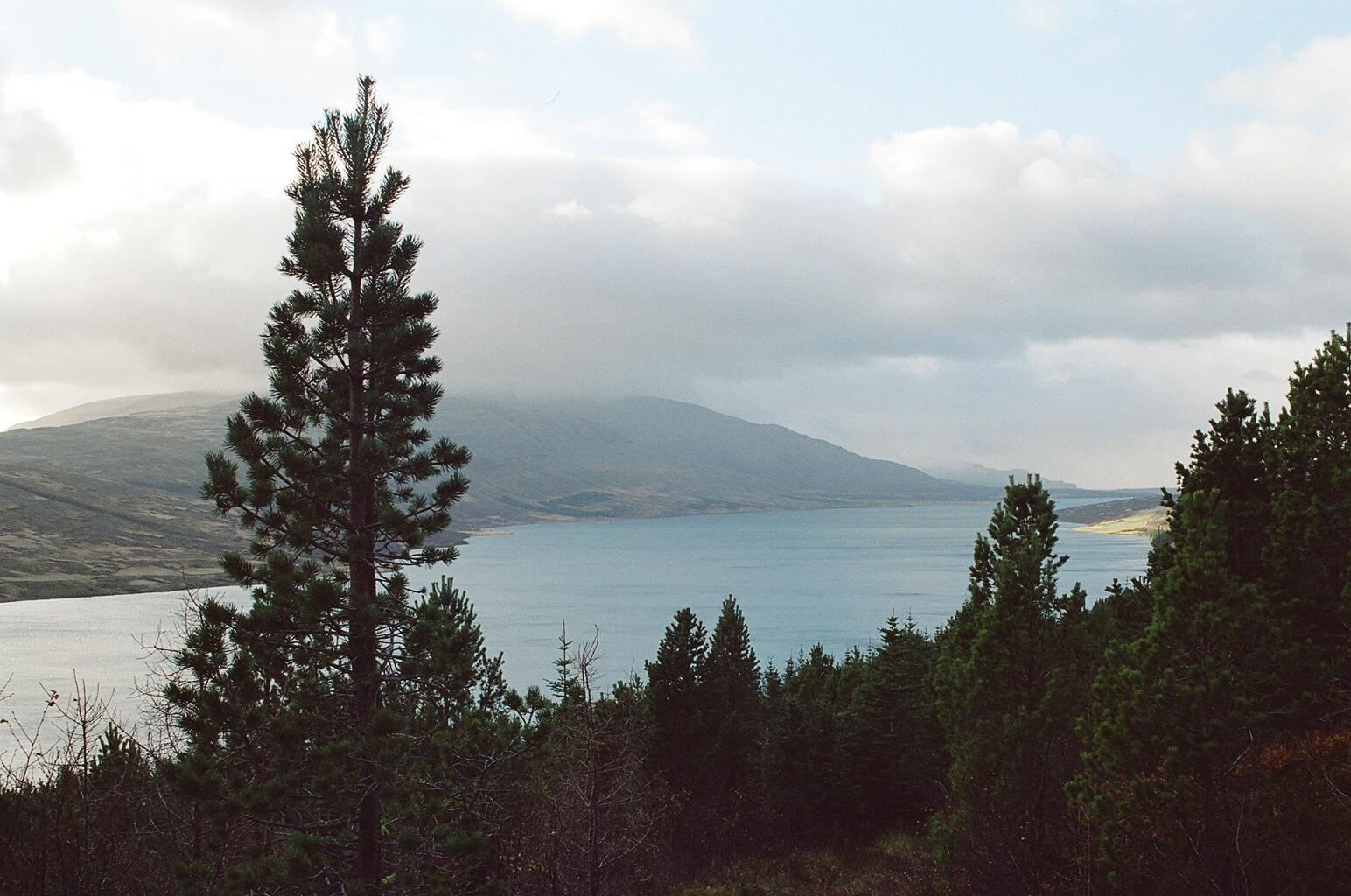
- seen from the west

- Location within Iceland
- Coordinates: 64°31′N 21°27′W
- Type: Natural lake, reservoir
- Basin countries: Iceland
- Max. length: 15 km (9.3 mi)
- Max. width: 1 km (0.62 mi)
- Surface area: 14.7 km^{2} (5.7 sq mi)
- Max. depth: 48 m (157 ft)

Skorradalsvatn (Icelandic pronunciation: [ˈskɔrːaˌtalsˌvahtn̥]) is a lake in the west of Iceland. It is situated in a narrow valley between the Hvalfjörður and the valley Reykholtsdalur (see Reykholt). Its length is about 15 km.

Around the lake there are some high mountains, for example Skarðsheiði [ˈskarðsˌheiːðɪ]. Unusually for Iceland, the shores of the lake are quite forested due to reforestation started by a governmental initiative. Consequently, the valley looks a bit like some regions in the Alps, for example near Salzburg in Austria.

The lake is also a reservoir so that the level of the water surface has been raised.

There are no villages on the shores, but many of summer houses.

== See also ==
- List of lakes of Iceland
