= Fljótsdalshérað =

- Former municipality
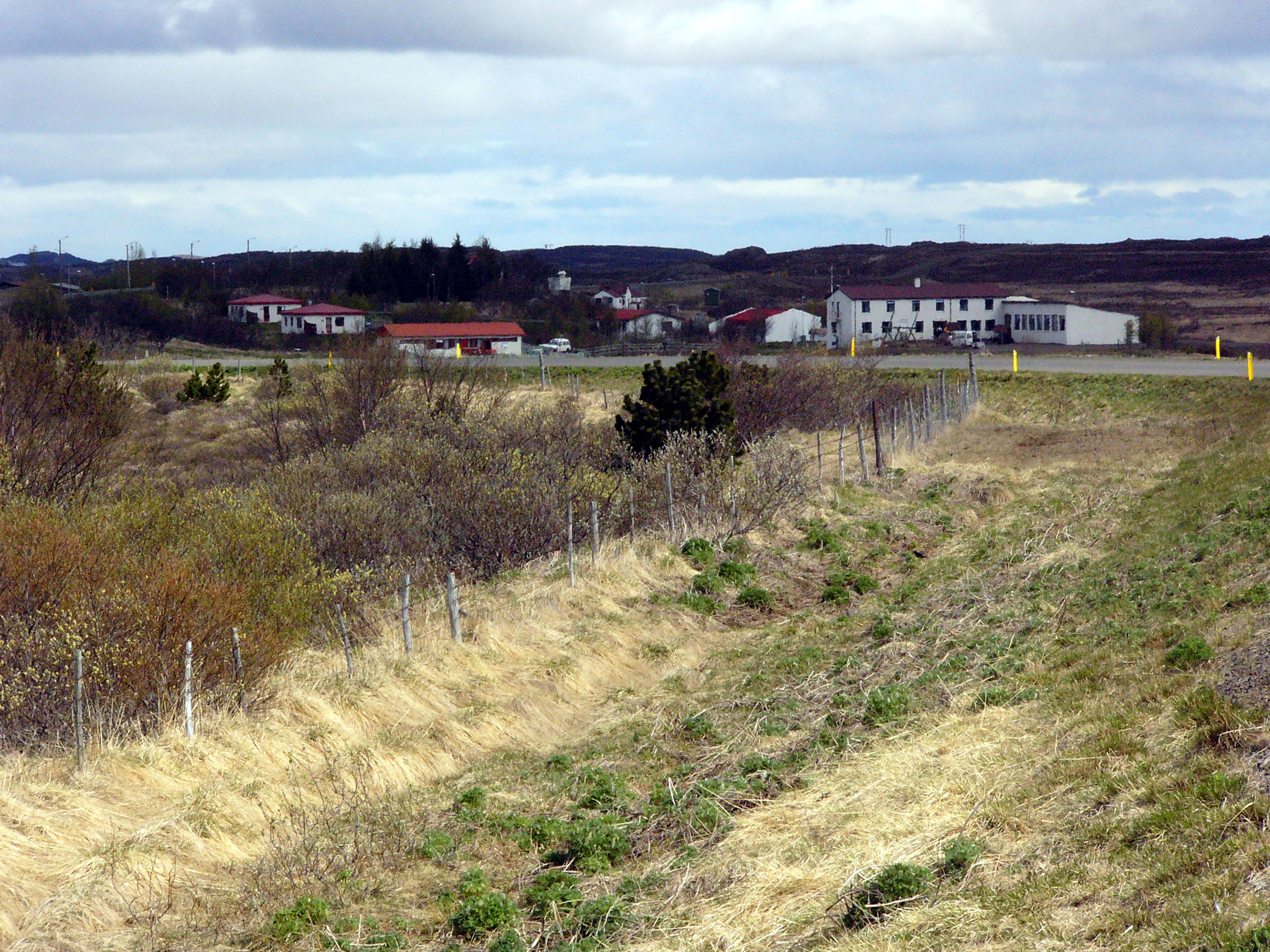
- Skyline of Fljótsdalshérað

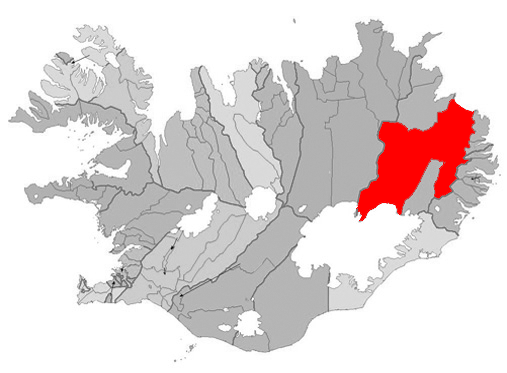
- Location of the municipality

- Location within Iceland
- Coordinates: 65.264°N 14.395°W
- Country: Iceland
- Region: Eastern Region
- Constituency: Northeast Constituency
- Municipality: Múlaþing

Government
  - Mayor: Björn Ingimarsson

Area
  - Total: 8,884 km^{2} (3,430 sq mi)

Population (2018)
  - Total: 3,580
  - Density: 0.403/km^{2} (1.04/sq mi)
- Postal code(s): 700, 701
- Website: egilsstadir.is

Fljótsdalshérað (Icelandic pronunciation: [ˈfljoutsˌtalsˌçɛːraθ]) was a municipality located in eastern Iceland. In 2020 it merged with three neighbouring municipalities to form Múlaþing.
