= Skriðuklaustur =

Farm and historical site in eastern Iceland

Coordinates: 65.0414°N 14.9533°W

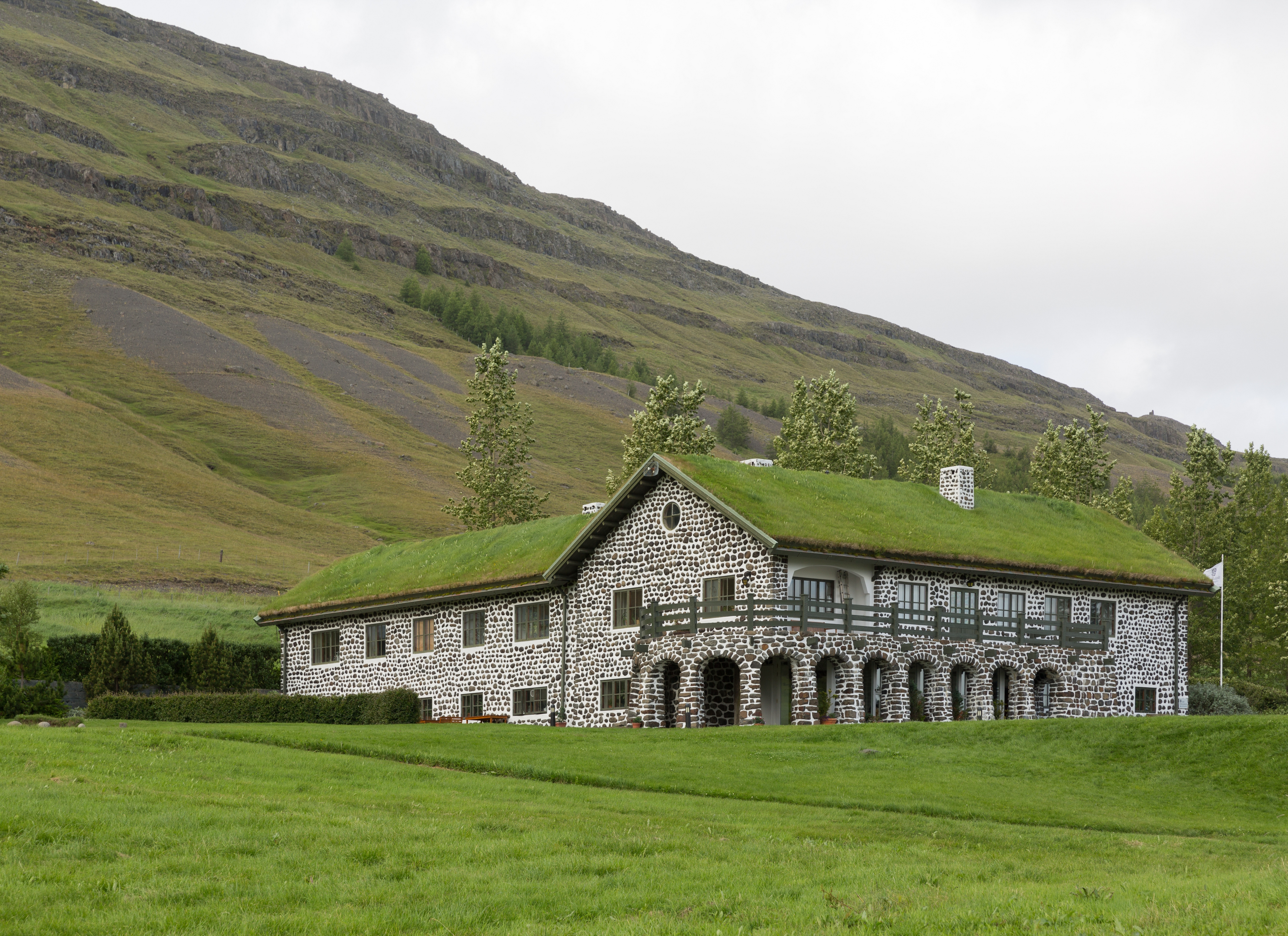
Gunnar Gunnarsson’s mansion

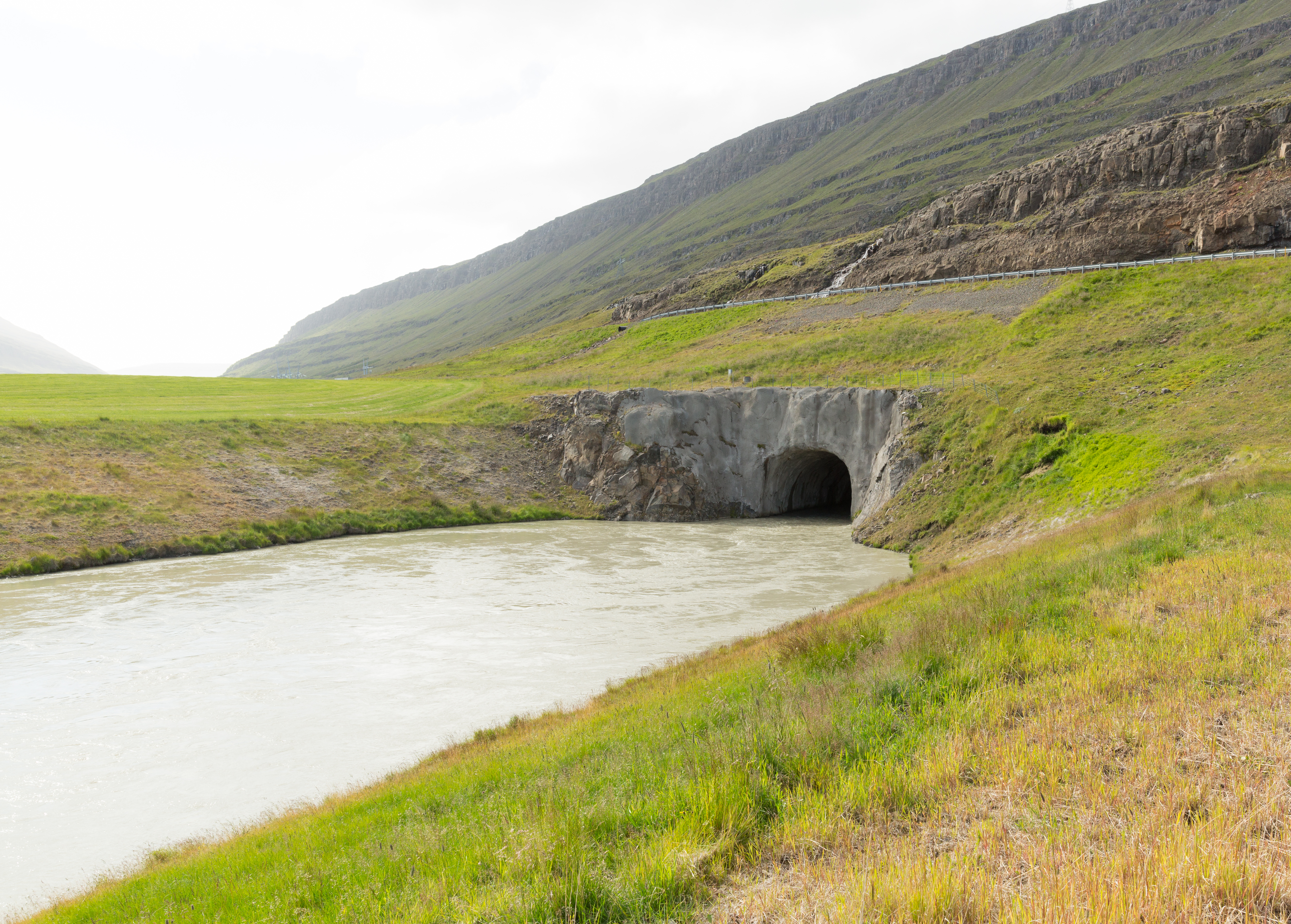
The end of the tunnel at Skriðuklaustur leading water from Kárahnjúkastífla Dam to the power plant 50 km away

Skriðuklaustur (Icelandic pronunciation: [ˈskrɪːðʏˌkʰlœystʏr̥]) is an old farmstead and a historic site in the valley of Fljótsdalur, Iceland. It contains the ruins of a 16th-century monastery, which were revealed by an archaeological excavation between 2002 and 2012.

On site is the mansion of the famous Icelandic writer Gunnar Gunnarsson (1889–1975). It was built in 1939 when he returned home after living in Denmark for more than 30 years. The mansion was designed by German architect Fritz Höger, and is now a centre for culture & history with exhibitions, personal guided tours and the renowned restaurant Klausturkaffi. Snæfellsstofa, one of the visitor centers for the Vatnajökull National Park is also at Skriðuklaustur.

Nearby is the end of the tunnel that leads water from the Kárahnjúkastífla Dam to the power plant in Fljótsdalur (about 50 kilometers away) near Skriðuklaustur.
