= Deildartunguhver =

Hot spring in Iceland

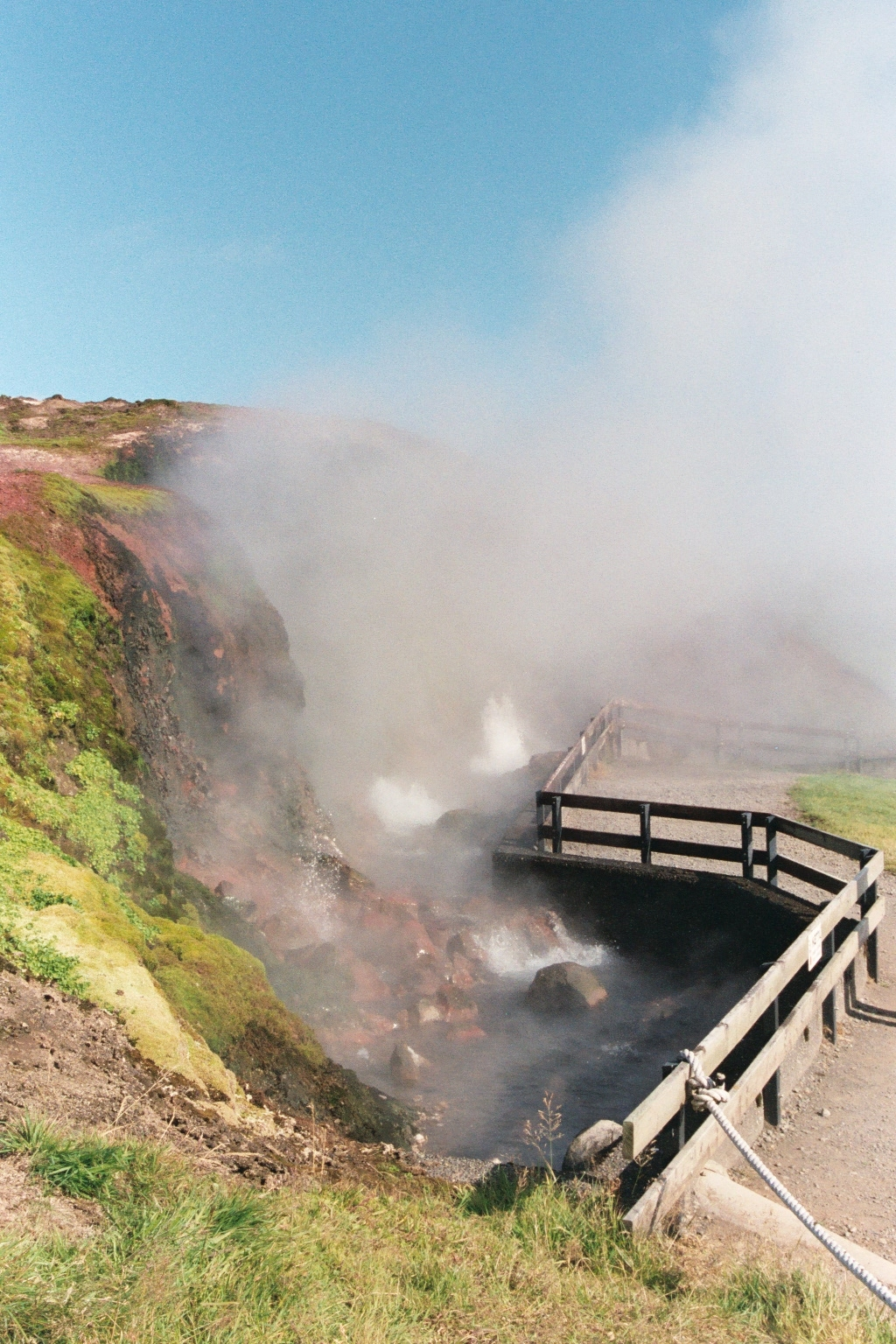
- Interactive map of Deildartunguhver
- Location: Reykholtsdalur, Iceland
- Coordinates: 64°40′32″N 21°30′45″W
- Spring source: superheated groundwater
- Type: geothermal
- Temperature: 97 °C (207 °F)

Deildartunguhver (Icelandic pronunciation: [ˈteiltarˌtʰuŋkʏˌkʰvɛːr̥]) is a hot spring in Reykholtsdalur, Iceland. It is characterized by a very high flow rate for a hot spring (180 liters/second) and water emerges at 97 °C (207 °F). It is the highest-flow hot spring in Europe. (Note: By comparison: * Combined, the 47 hot springs in Hot Springs, Arkansas, U.S., have a flow of 35 liters/second (9 gal/second) and the water is 35 to 68 °C (95 to 154 °F). * The Hay-Yo-Kay Hot Springs in Truth or Consequences, New Mexico, U.S., have a flow of 99 liters/second (26 gal/second). * Lava Hot Springs in Idaho, U.S., have a flow of 130 liters/second (34 gal/second). Glenwood Springs in Colorado, U.S., have a flow of 143 liters/second (38 gal/second). * The Dalhousie Springs complex in Australia has a peak output of about 250 liters/second (66 gal/second) now. * There are many very-high-flow non-thermal springs; there are 33 recognized "magnitude-one springs" (having a flow in excess of 2,800 liters/second in Florida alone. Silver Springs, Florida, U.S., has a flow of more than 23,000 liters/second (6,100.)

Some of the water is used for heating; it is piped 34 kilometres (21 mi) away to Borgarnes and 64 kilometres (40 mi) away to Akranes.

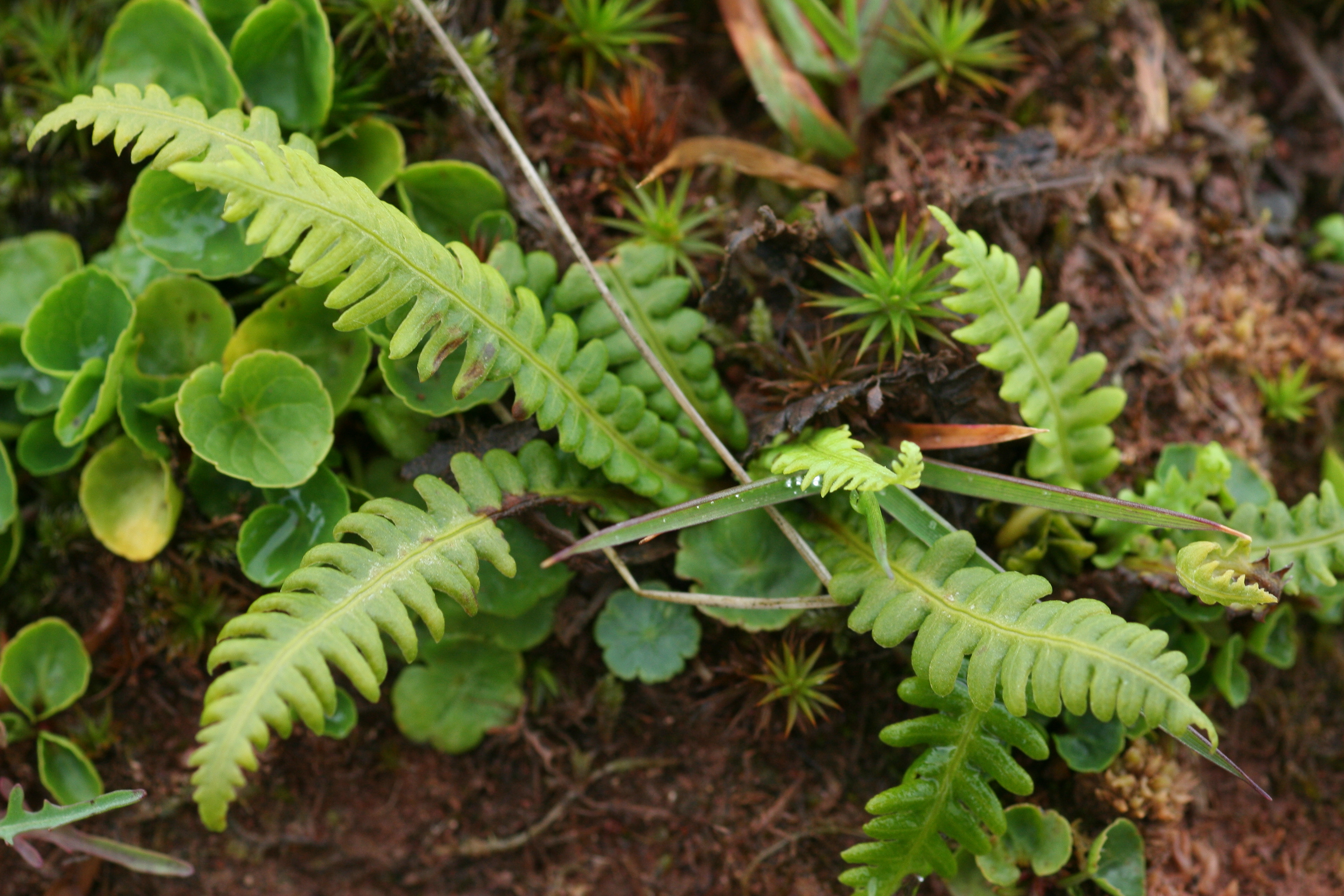
Struthiopteris fallax (Lange) S. Molino, Gabriel y Galán & Wasowicz

A fern called Struthiopteris fallax, grows in Deildartunguhver. This fern is the only endemic fern in Iceland, and it does not grow anywhere else in the world.
