= Reykholt, Western Iceland =

Reykholt
- Village
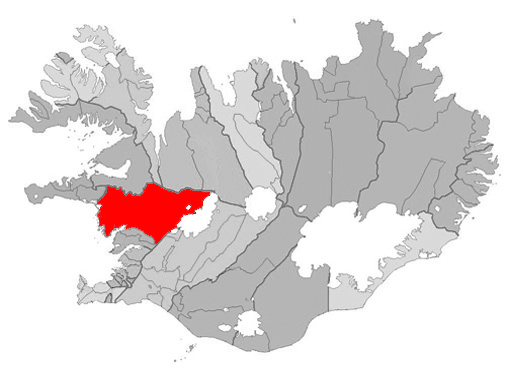
- Location of the Municipality of Borgarbyggð

- Location in Iceland
- Coordinates: 64°40′N 21°18′W
- Country: Iceland
- Constituency: Northwest Constituency
- Region: Western Region
- Municipality: Borgarbyggð
- Time zone: UTC+0 (GMT)

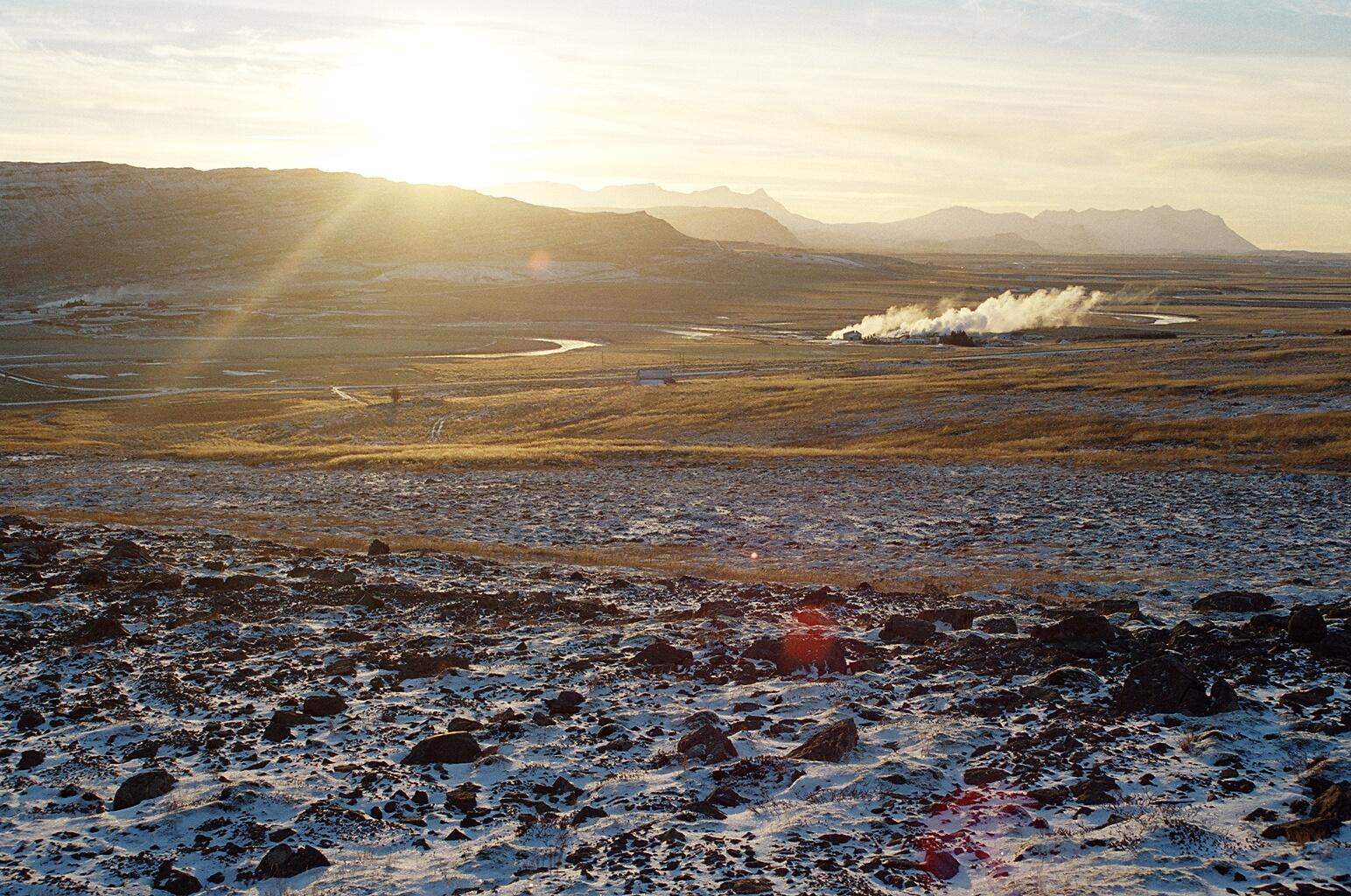
Reykholtsdalur with Deildartunguhver

Reykholt (pronounced [ˈreikˌhɔl̥t]) is a village in Iceland. It sits in the valley of the river Reykjadalsá, called Reykholtsdalur, and is part of Borgarfjörður, Western Region.

Reykholt was at one time one of the intellectual centers of the island and had for many years one of the most important schools of the country. The poet and politician Snorri Sturluson lived in Reykholt during the Middle Ages. Sturluson's records of the Old Norse language and mythology of medieval Iceland are invaluable to modern scholars. Remains of his farm and a bathroom with hot pot and a tunnel between the bath and the house can still be visited. The Snorrastofa Cultural / Research Centre was established in Reykholt on September 6, 1988, with opening ceremonies attended by Vigdís Finnbogadóttir, President of Iceland and King Olav V of Norway.

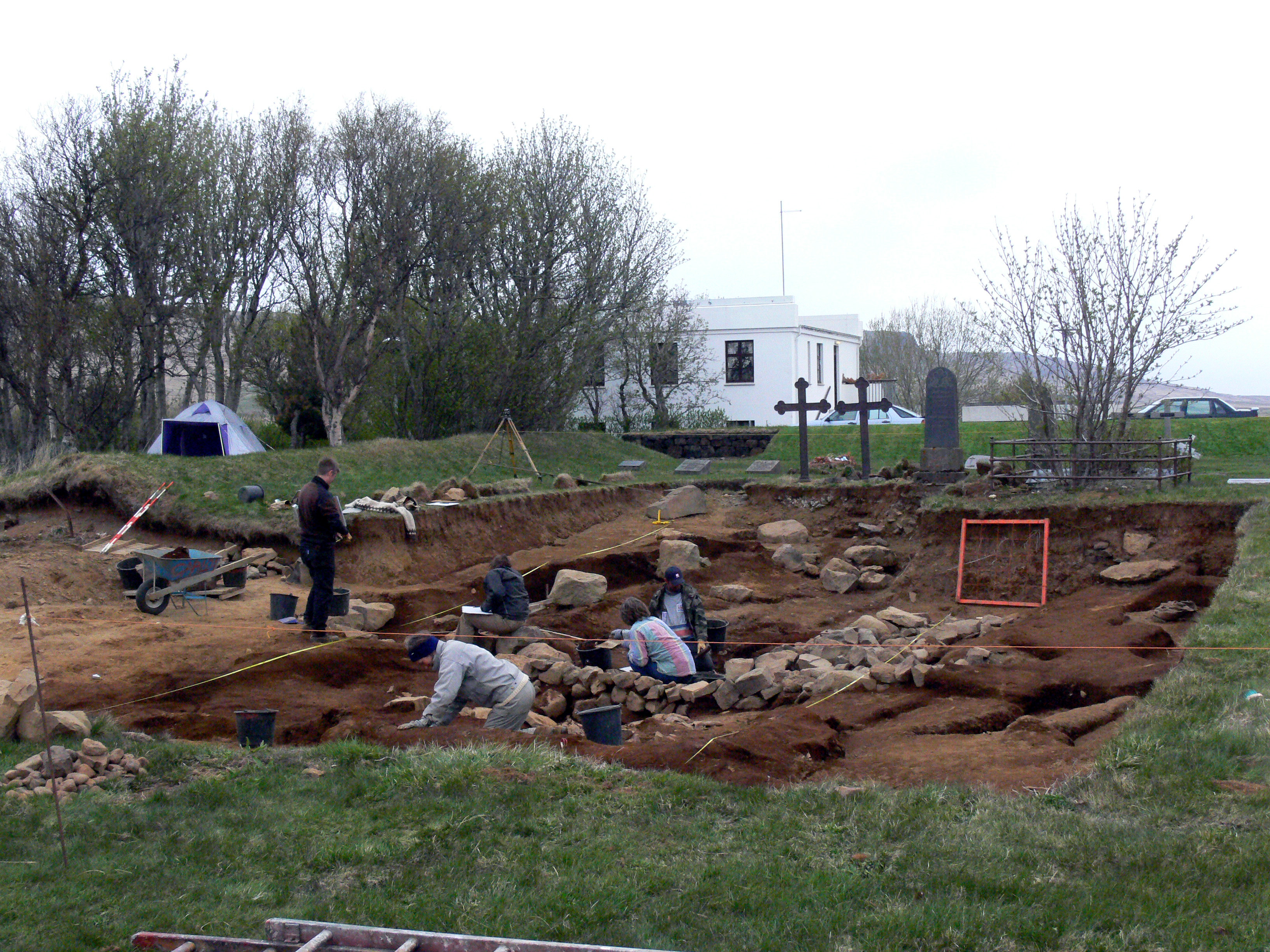
Work in progress on the site of the oldest church

Today, the village has 60 inhabitants, a school centre and a library concentrating on the works of Snorri Sturluson. A statue of Snorri by Gustav Vigeland can be found here. Archeologists are still working here and finding medieval remains. In the vicinity, Japanese scientists are doing research on the aurora borealis (the northern lights).

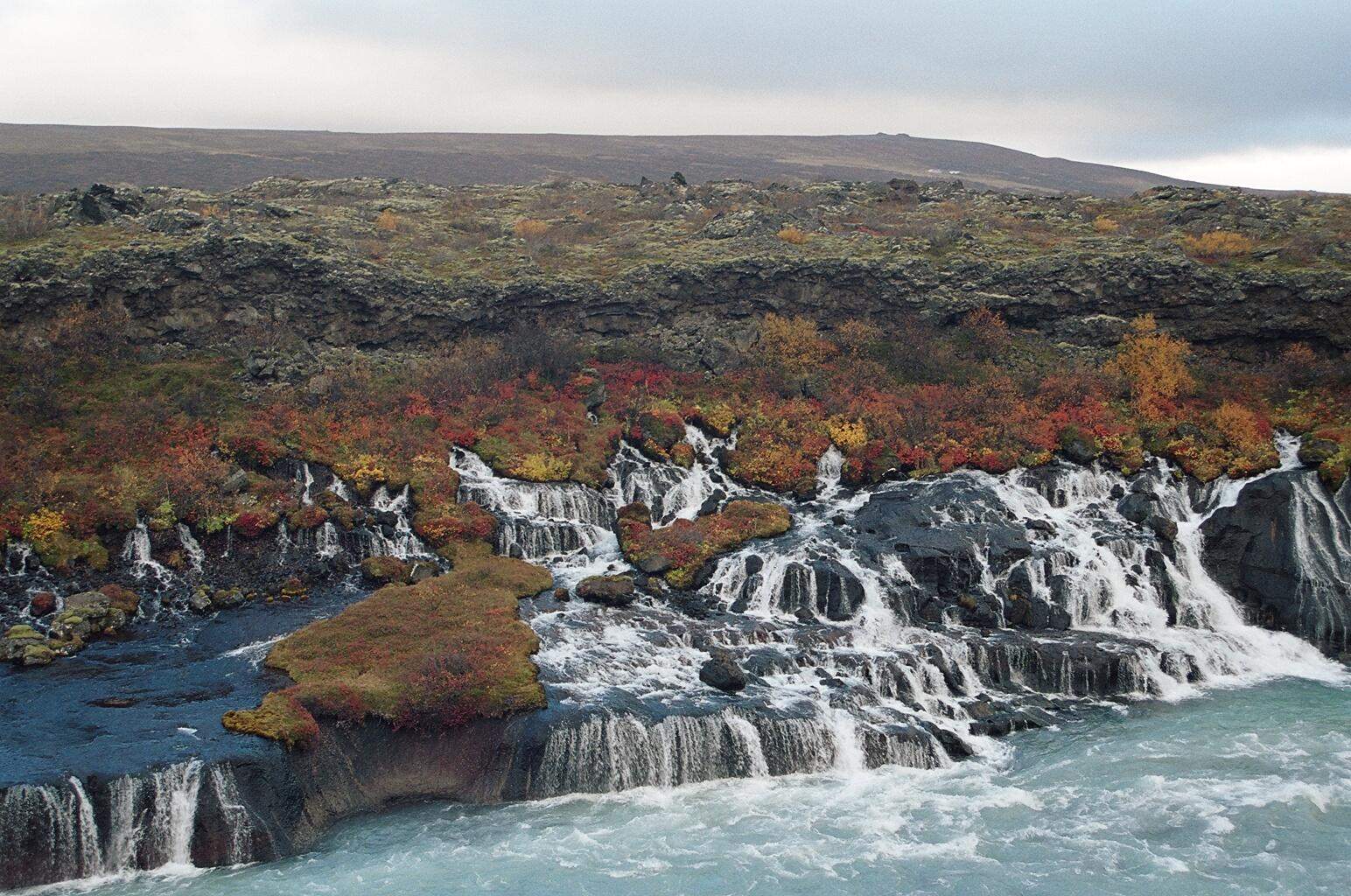
Hraunfossar

About 20 km from Reykholt, there are the lava waterfalls Hraunfossar. It is also possible to go from there to the caves Surtshellir in the lava field Hallmundarhraun (about 35 km). On the way to Borgarnes, people pass by the hot springs of Deildartunguhver. They exceed all the other hot springs of the country in their output of hot water: 180 litres/second at 97 °C.

== See also ==
- Waterfalls of Iceland
- History of Iceland
