= Stafholtstungnahreppur =

Coordinates: 64.766667°N 21.65°W

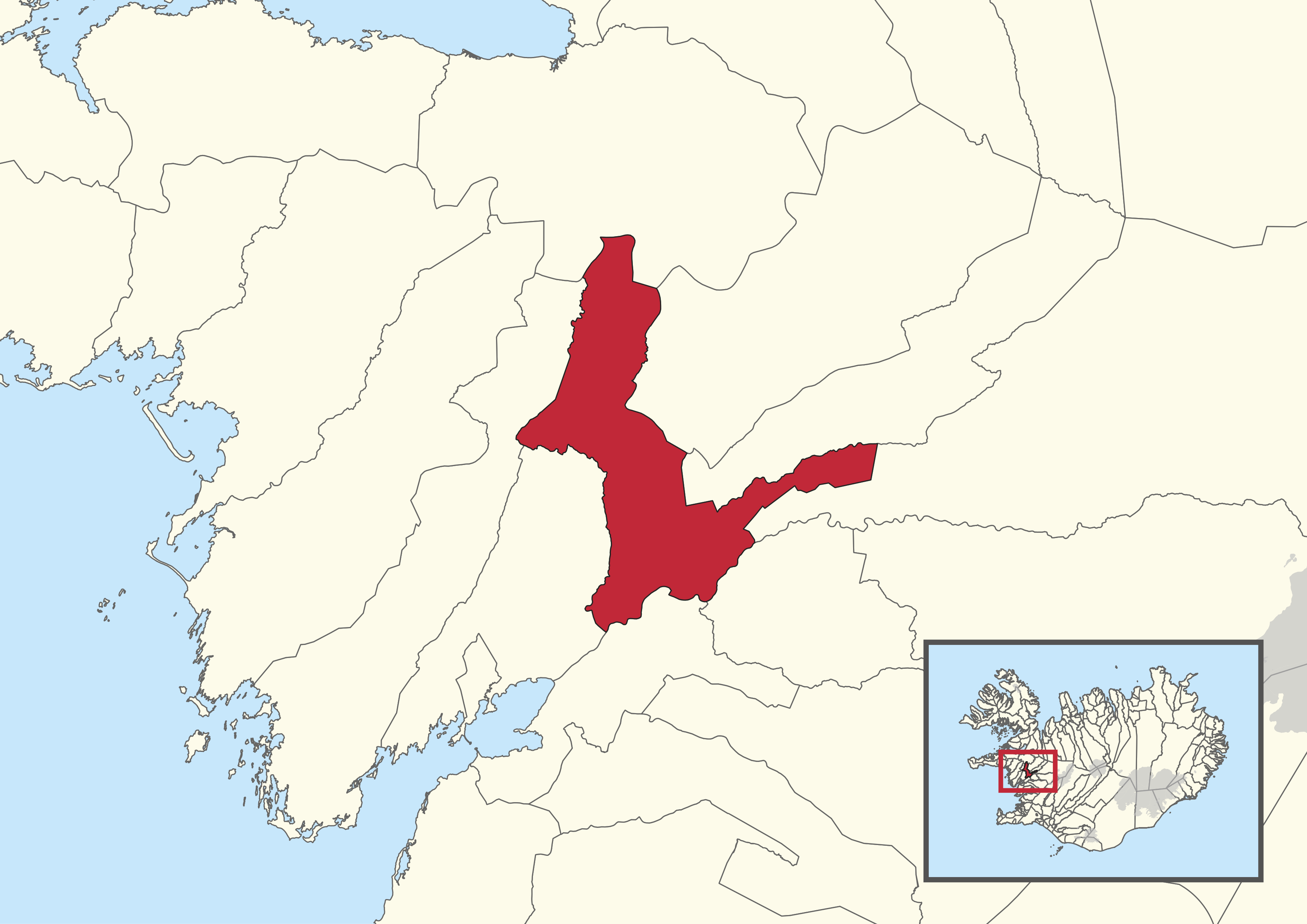
Stafholtstungnahreppur

Stafholtstungnahreppur (Icelandic pronunciation: [ˈstavˌhɔl̥(t)sˌtʰuŋnaˌr̥ɛhpʏr̥, -tʰunːa-]) was formerly a rural parish (hreppur) in Mýrasýsla county, west Iceland, described as a "typical farm parish". On 11 June 1994 Stafholtstungnahreppur united with Borgarnes, Hraunhreppur and Norðurárdalshreppur under the name Borgarbyggð.
