= Hraunhreppur =

Coordinates: 64.698°N 22.042°W

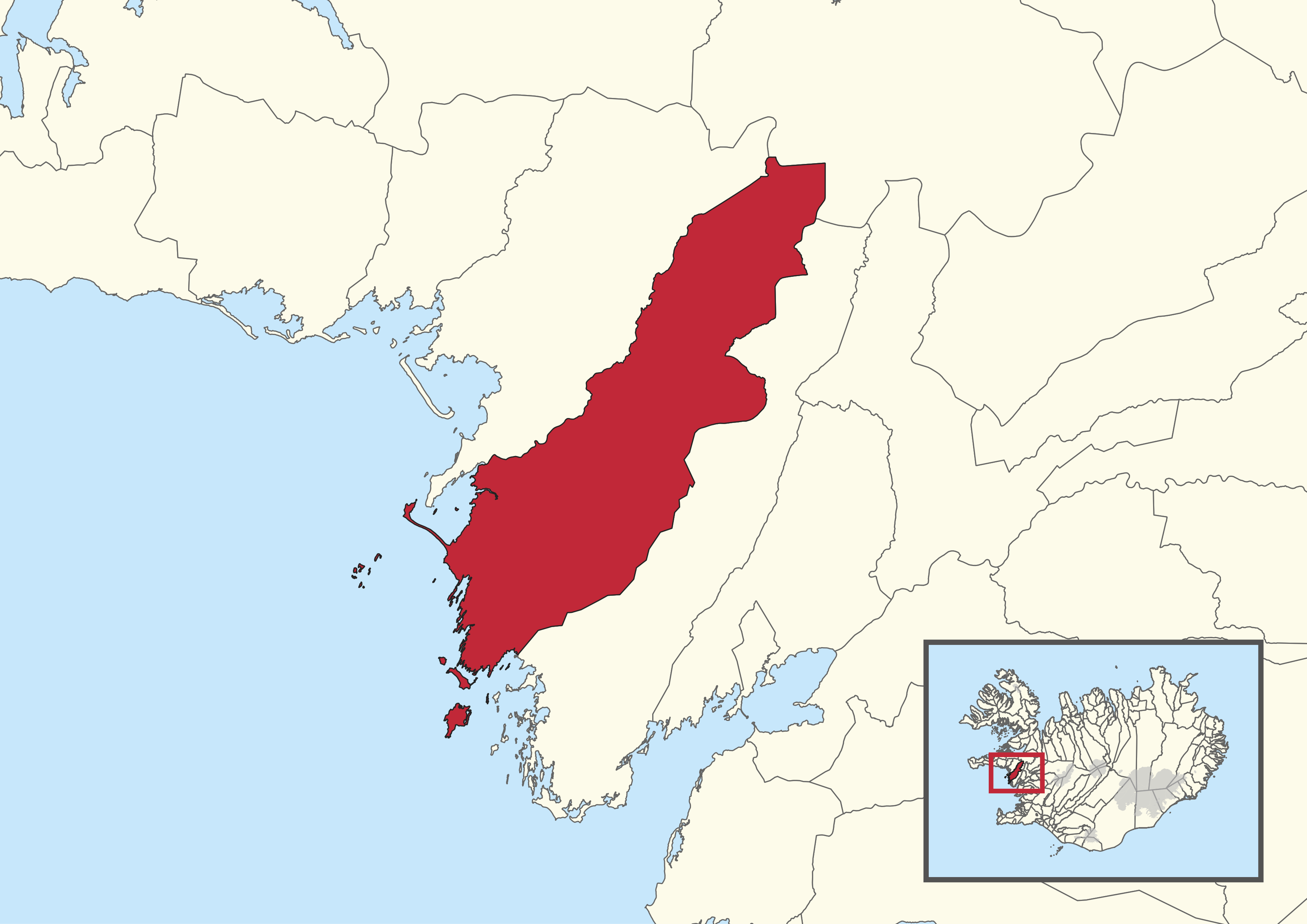
Hraunhreppur

Hraunhreppur (Icelandic pronunciation: [ˈr̥œynˌr̥ɛhpʏr̥]) was formerly a rural parish (hreppur) in Mýrasýsla county, west Iceland. In 1994, Hraunhreppur united with Borgarnes, Norðurárdalshreppur and Stafholtstungnahreppur under the name Borgarbyggð, using the Borgarnes seal and offices.

The Hítardalur valley in Hraunhreppur parish is the location of one of Iceland's Singing Caves (Sönghellir).

There was a major fire here in 2006.
