= Norðurárdalshreppur =

Coordinates: 64.866667°N 21.25°W

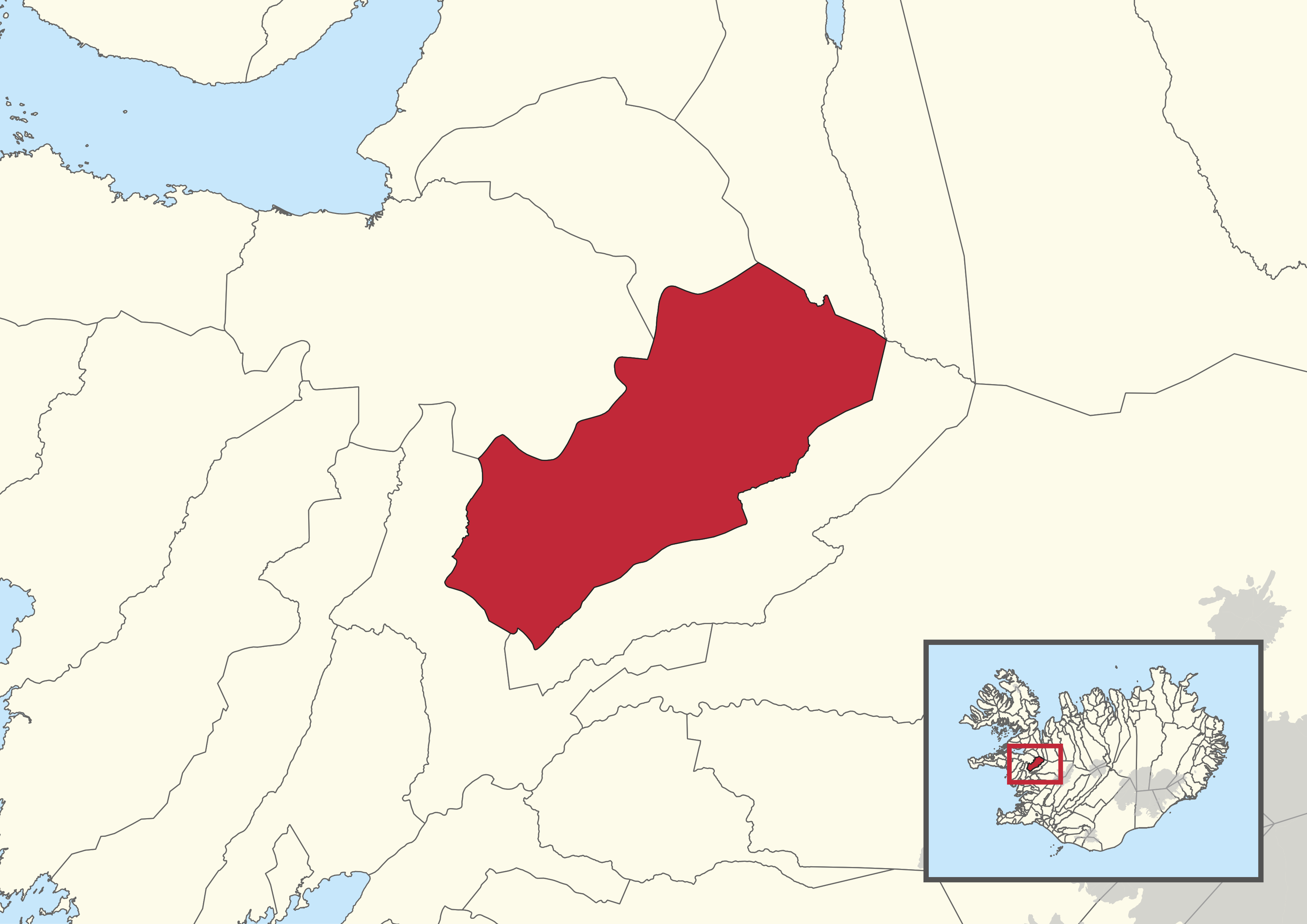
Norðurárdalshreppur

Norðurárdalshreppur (Icelandic pronunciation: [ˈnɔrðʏrˌaurˌtalsˌr̥ɛhpʏr̥]) was formerly a rural parish (hreppur) in Mýrasýsla county, west Iceland. On 11 June 1994 Norðurárdalshreppur united with Borgarnes, Hraunhreppur and Stafholtstungnahreppur under the name Borgarbyggð.
