= Kristín Sif Björgvinsdóttir =

Icelandic radio host and athlete

- Born: 2 December 1983 (age 42); Iceland
- Presenting career
- Show: Ísland vaknar
- Station: K100
- Time slot: Monday-Friday 6:00–10:00 GMT
- Country: Iceland
- Boxing career
- Height: 167 cm (5 ft 6 in)
- Weight: 74 kg (163 lb)

Boxing record
- Total fights: 12

Kristín Sif Björgvinsdóttir (born 2 December 1983) is an Icelandic radio host and an athlete. She currently hosts the radio show Ísland vaknar (English: Iceland wakes up) on K100.

== Early life ==
Kristín grew up in Borgarnes. At the age of 11, she started playing basketball with the youth teams of Ungmennafélagið Skallagrímur. She later took up track and field and Olympic lifting.

== Boxing ==
On 25 March 2018, Kristín finished second in the Nordic Boxing Championships in Oslo, Norway. In 2018 and 2019, she was named the Icelandic Female Boxer of the Year by the Icelandic Boxing Federation.

== Personal life ==
In 2018, Kristín's spouse of 13 years, committed suicide after battling depression and drug addiction.
