= Hvítá bridge =

Hvítá bridge Hvítárbrú
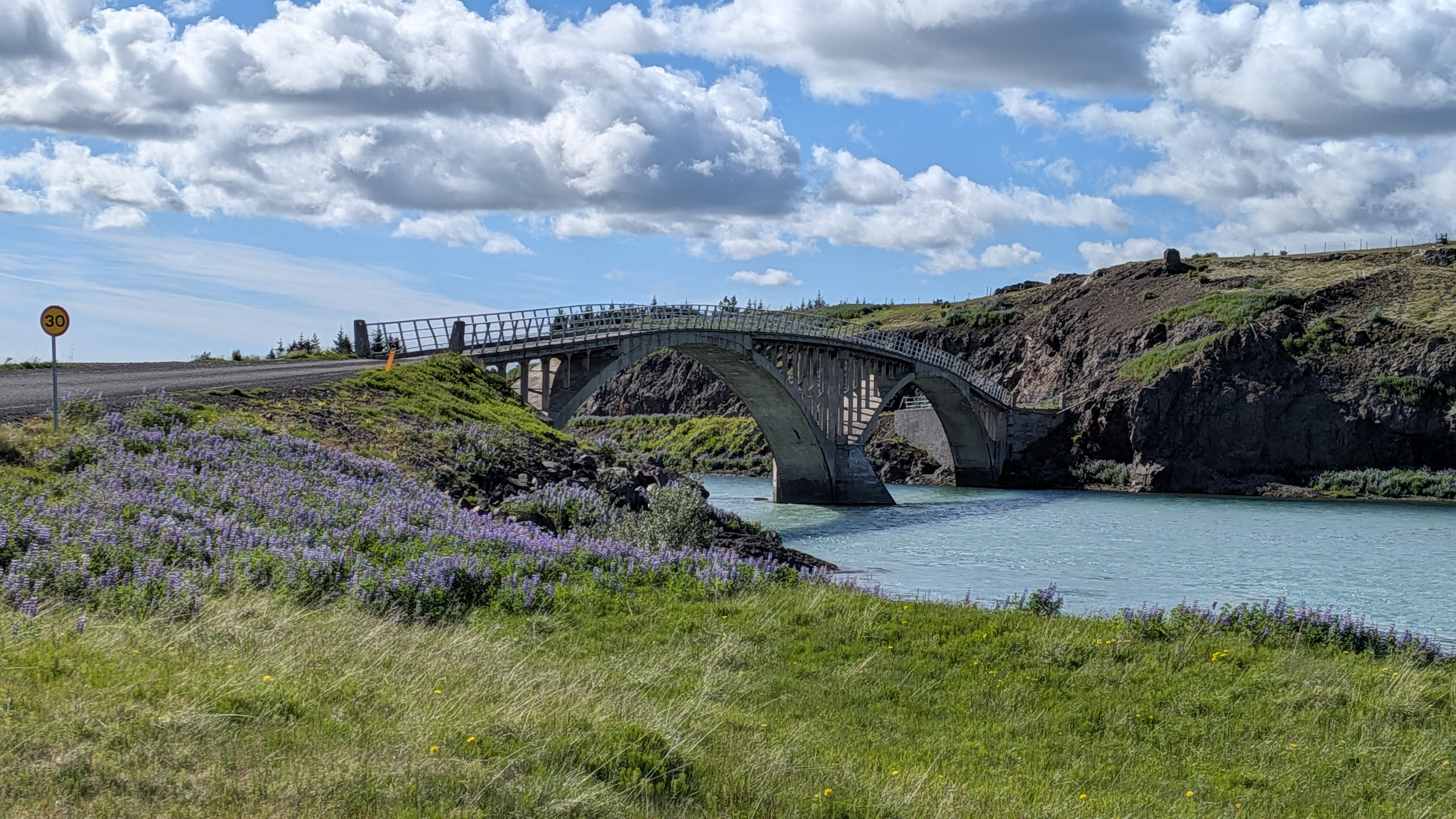
- Hvítá bridge in 2026
- Coordinates: 64.60335°N 21.70909°W
- Crosses: Hvítá
- Locale: Western Region, Iceland

Characteristics
- Load limit: 400 kg/m^{2}, 6 t/vehicle

History
- Designer: Árni Pálsson

Location
- Interactive map of Hvítá bridge

The Hvítá bridge (Icelandic: Hvítárbrú [ˈkʰviːtˌaurˌpruː], unofficial name) is a single-lane road bridge opened in 1928 traversing the Hvítá river in western Iceland. It is a reinforced concrete bridge consisting of two arches with a total length of 106 metres (348 ft). Until the opening of the bridge over the Borgarfjörður at Borgarnes in 1981, it was part of the main road connection between northern and southern Iceland. On the 2002 anniversary convention of Verkfræðingafélag Islands, the Icelandic engineering association, the bridge was awarded the most outstanding Icelandic engineering project of the 1921-1930 decade.

== Position ==
The bridge is located at Ferjukot farmstead, about 4 kilometres (2.5 mi) upstream of the Hvítá′s mouth to Borgarfjörður, on the area of today’s municipality of Borgarbyggð.

== Construction ==
The bridge was designed by Árni Pálsson (1897–1970), an Icelandic engineer. As it was common practice for Icelandic road bridges of that time, it was designed a single-lane bridge. The total length is 106 metres (348 ft), the width is 3 metres (9.8 ft), and each arch spans 51 metres (167 ft). During construction, which started in April 1928, 1,100 cubic metres (1,400 cu yd) of concrete and 22 metric tons (22 t) of steel where processed. The provided maximum vehicle weight is 6 metric tons (6.0 t). The designated construction costs of 169.000 Icelandic krónas could be adhered to approximately. The opening ceremony on 1 November 1928 was attended by prime minister Tryggvi Þórhallsson and 500 others despite cold and snowy weather.
