= Snorrastofa =

Independent research centre

Coordinates: 64.665034°N 21.291099°W

Snorrastofa is an independent research centre established in 1995 in Reykholt in West Iceland.

The centre was the main residence of Snorri Sturluson (1179–1241). Its main task is to instigate and conduct research on the medieval period in general, and Snorri and his works in particular. The Snorrastofa Cultural / Research Centre was established in Reykholt on September 6, 1988, with opening ceremonies attended by Vigdís Finnbogadóttir, President of Iceland, and King Olaf V of Norway.
