= Sigurður Páll Jónsson =

Icelandic politician

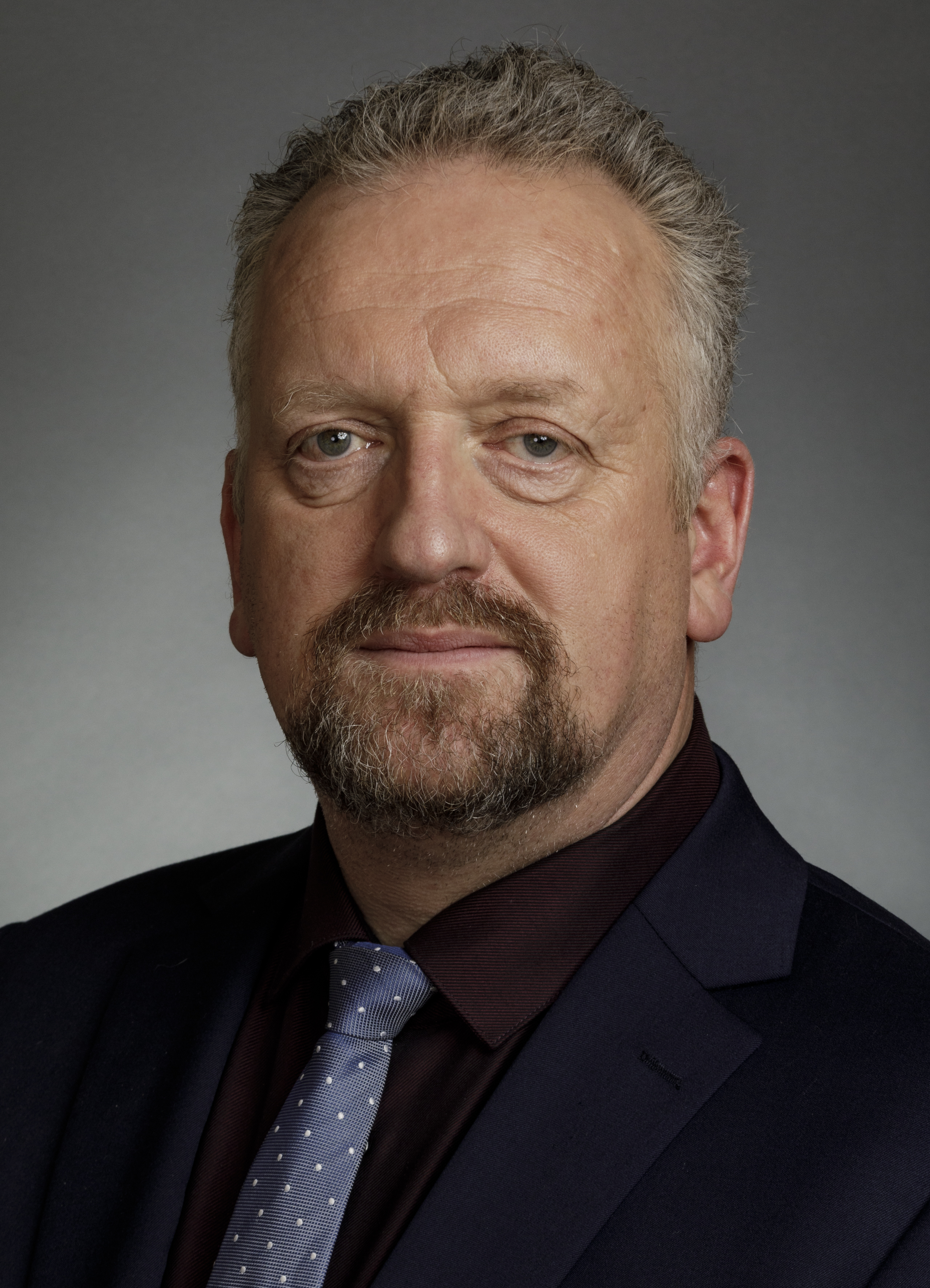
Member of Parliament Sigurður Páll Jónsson after the 2017 parliamentary elections

Sigurður Páll Jónsson (born 23 June 1958) is an Icelandic politician from the Centre Party. He represented Northwest in the Parliament of Iceland from 2017 to 2021.

== Personal life ==
Sigurður Páll Jónsson was born in Borgarnes. He lives in Stykkishólmi and is married to Hafdísi Björgvinsdóttir. The couple have three children and three grandchildren. His son Bragi Páll Sigurðsson is a left wing journalist.
