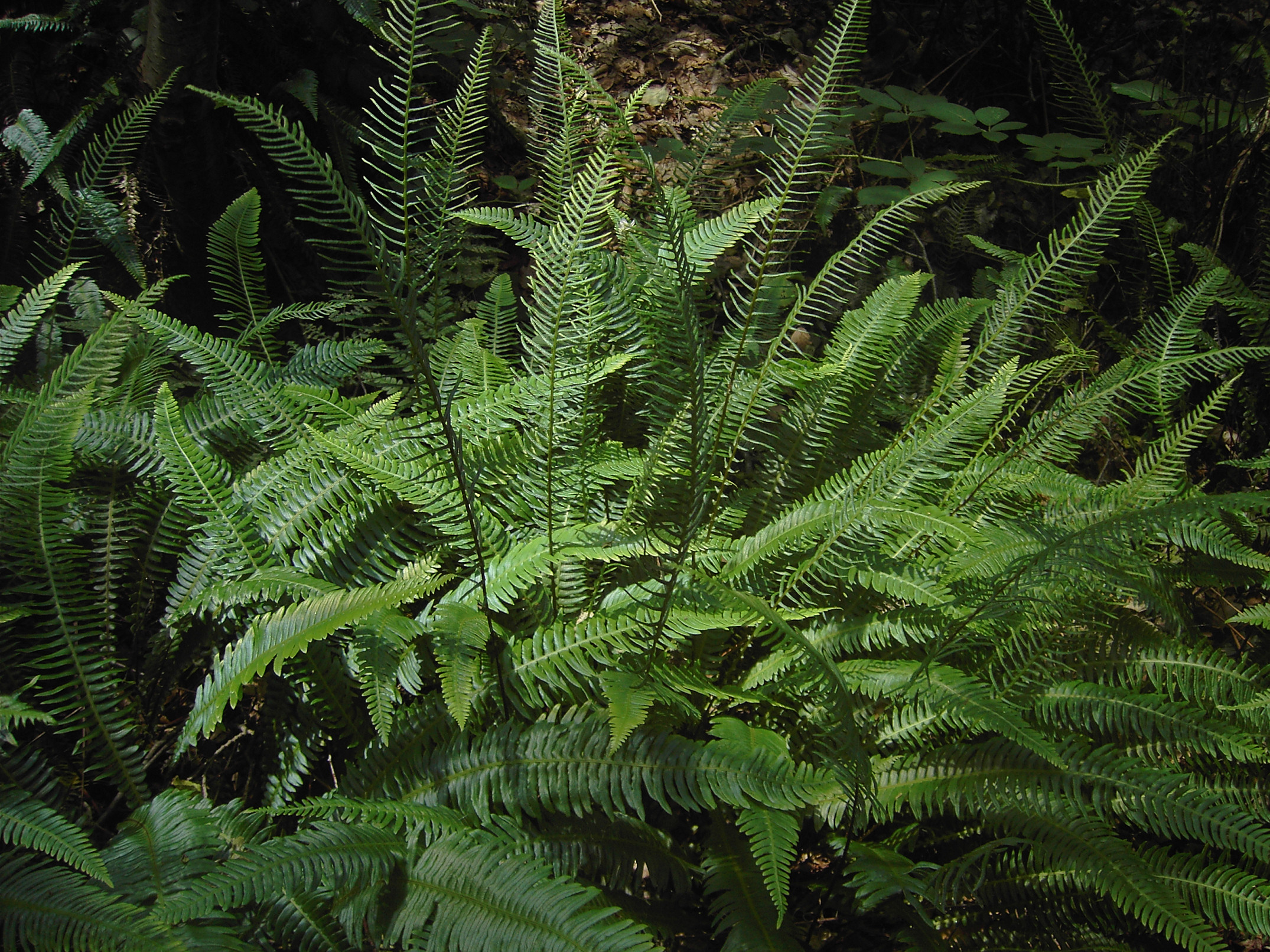
- Struthiopteris spicant

Scientific classification
- Kingdom: Plantae
- Clade: Tracheophytes
- Division: Polypodiophyta
- Class: Polypodiopsida
- Order: Polypodiales
- Suborder: Aspleniineae
- Family: Blechnaceae
- Subfamily: Blechnoideae
- Genus: Struthiopteris; Scop.

Species
- See text

= Struthiopteris =

Genus of ferns

Struthiopteris is a genus of ferns belonging to the family Blechnaceae, subfamily Blechnoideae.

== Species ==
In the circumscription used in the Pteridophyte Phylogeny Group classification of 2016 (PPG I), the genus contains five species. The Checklist of Ferns and Lycophytes of the World places three of these species in the genus Spicantopsis.

- Struthiopteris amabilis (Makino) Ching (syn. Blechnum amabile Makino) = Spicantopsis amabilis (Makino) Nakai
- Struthiopteris castanea (Makino & Nemoto) Nakai (syns Lomaria castanea Makino, Blechnum castaneum Makino & Nemoto)
- Struthiopteris fallax (Lange) S.Molino, Gabriel y Galán & Wasowicz
- Struthiopteris hancockii (Hance) Tagawa (syn. Blechnum hancockii Hance) = Spicantopsis hancockii (Hance) Masam.
- Struthiopteris niponica (Kunze) Nakai (syns Lomaria niponica Kunze, Blechnum niponicum Makino) = Spicantopsis niponica (Kunze) Nakai
- Struthiopteris spicant (L.) F.W.Weiss (syns Osmunda spicant L., Blechnum spicant (L.) Sm.)
