= Hvanneyri =

Coordinates: 64.562°N 21.762°W

- Village
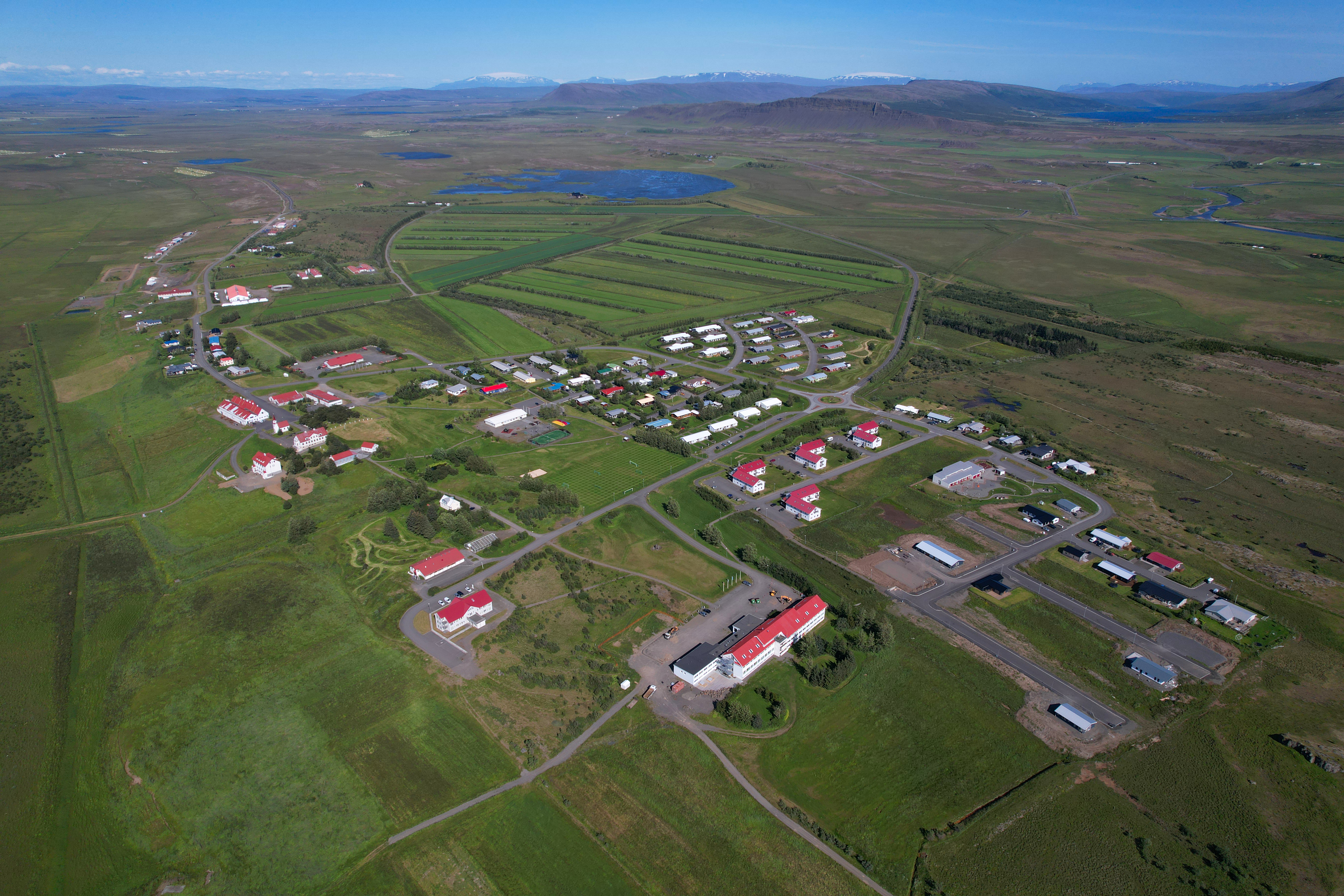
- Hvanneyri
- Interactive map of Hvanneyri
- Country: Iceland
- Region: Western
- Constituency: Northwest
- Municipality: Borgarbyggð

Population (2025)
  - Total: 285
- Demonyms: Hvanneyringar
- Postal code: 311
- Website: borgarbyggd.is/english

Hvanneyri (Icelandic pronunciation: [ˈkʰvanːeiˌrɪ]) is a small settlement in the municipality of Borgarbyggð in western Iceland. The settlement is an agricultural and church center known for its history of farming. Hvanneyri can be found 80 km north of Reykjavík. Hvanneyri is also home to the Agricultural University of Iceland. It has an estimated population of 250 inhabitants.
