= Agricultural University of Iceland =

Education and Research institution from Iceland

Coordinates: 64°33′40″N 21°46′11″W

- Landbúnaðarháskóli Íslands
- Agricultural University of Iceland / Landbúnaðarháskóli Íslands
- Type: Public
- Established: 2005
- Affiliations: NOVA Network, UNIgreen
- Rector: Ragnheiður I. Þórarinsdóttir
- Location: Hvanneyri, Iceland
- Campus: Rural
- Website: www.lbhi.is

The Agricultural University of Iceland (AUI) is an educational and research institution focusing on agricultural, environmental sciences, landscape architecture and planning founded in 2005. The university's main location is in Hvanneyri, near Borgarnes, Iceland, but it also operates research locations in Reykjavík (Kednaholt). AUI offers vocational training in agriculture, undergraduate and graduate studies in agricultural sciences, environmental sciences, equine sciences, forest sciences, landscape architecture, planning, restoration ecology and environmental changes at higher latitudes.

Agricultural University of Iceland plays a key role in developing societal issues related to agriculture, use of natural resources, planning, environment and climate, as well as issues concerning the society and economy as a whole.

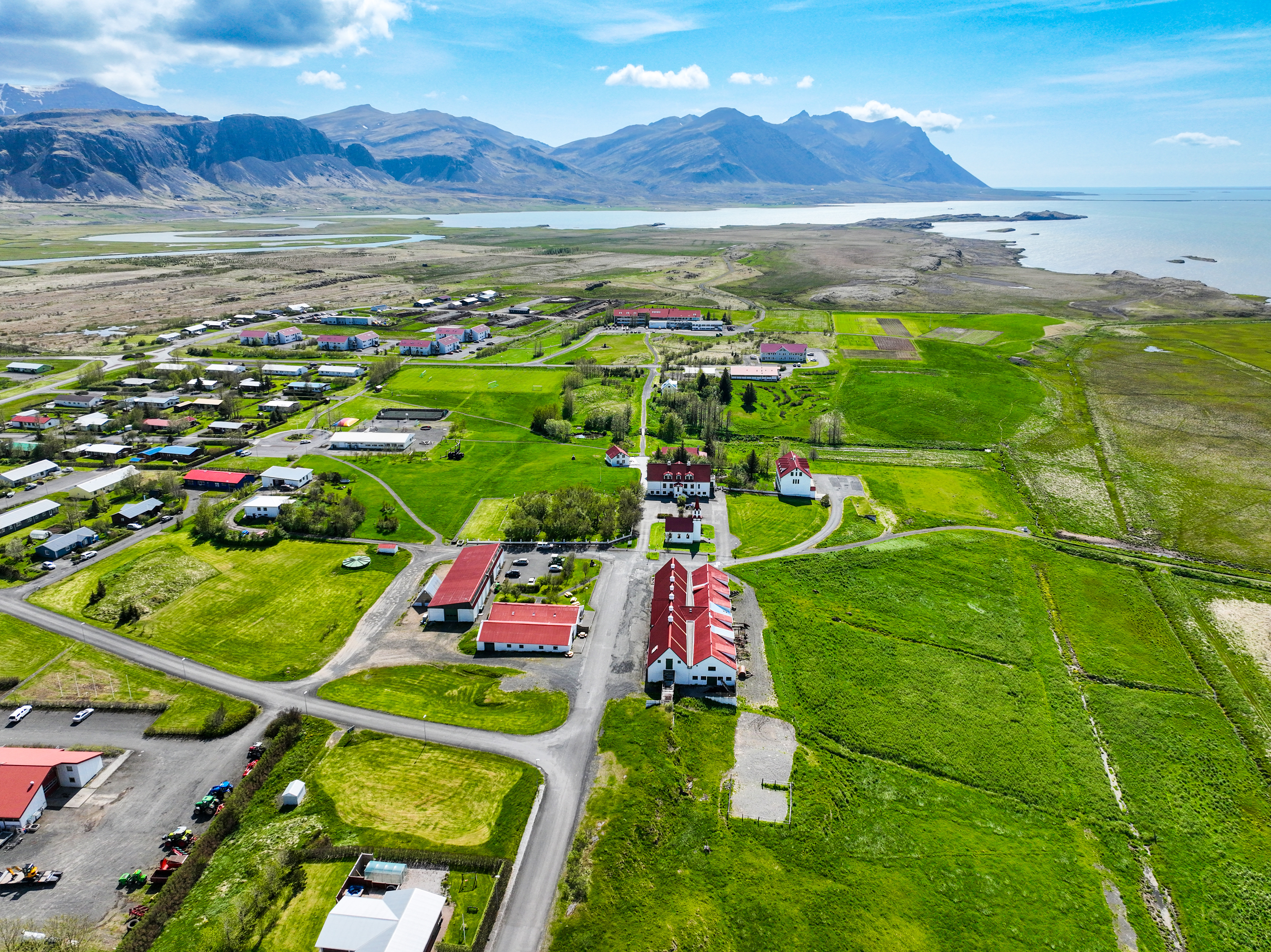

== Study lines ==
=== Vocational training ===
- Agriculture

=== Undergraduate ===
- Agricultural Sciences
- Equine Sciences
- Environmental Sciences
- Forest Science
- Landscape Architecture

=== Graduate ===
- Agricultural Science
- Environmental Changes at Higher Latitudes
- Environmental Sciences
- Equine Science
- Forest Science
- Restoration Ecology Individual MSc
- Restoration Ecology
- Planning
- Doctoral Studies PhD

== See also ==
- Skemman.is (digital library)
