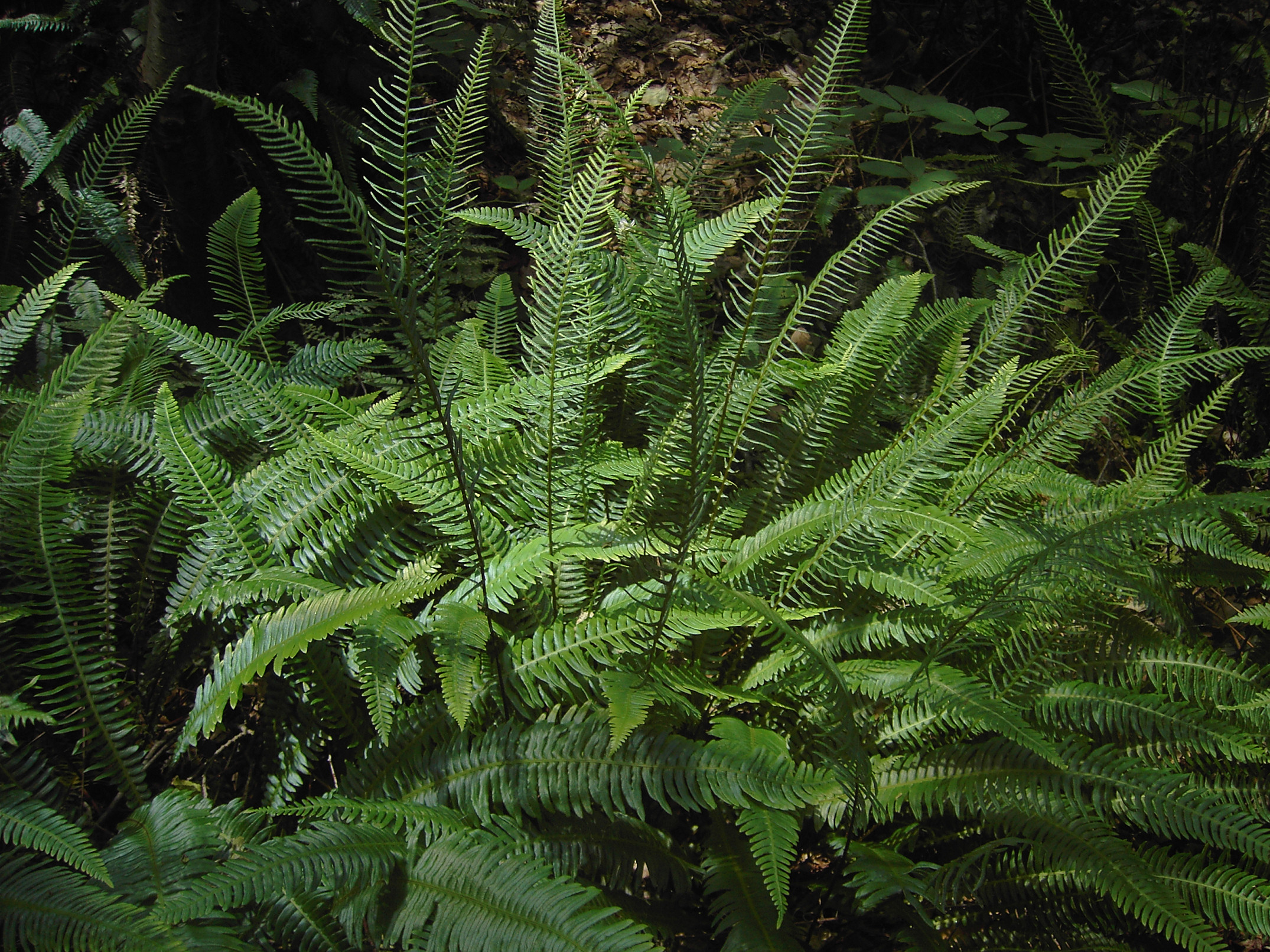

Conservation status
- Secure (NatureServe)

Scientific classification
- Kingdom: Plantae
- Clade: Embryophytes
- Clade: Tracheophytes
- Division: Polypodiophyta
- Class: Polypodiopsida
- Order: Polypodiales
- Suborder: Aspleniineae
- Family: Blechnaceae
- Genus: Struthiopteris
- Species: S. spicant

Binomial name
- Struthiopteris spicant (L.) F.W.Weiss

Synonyms
- Synonyms: Acrostichum lineatum; Cav.; Acrostichum nemorale; Lam.; Acrostichum spicant; (L.) Willd.; Asplenium spicant; Bernh.; Asplenium spicant; Ehrh.; Blechnum boreale; Sw.; Blechnum doodioides; Hook.; Blechnum heterophyllum; Opiz; Blechnum septentrionale; Sailer; Blechnum spicant; (L.) Roth; Homophyllum blechnoides; Merino; Lomaria borealis; Link; Lomaria crenata; C.Presl; Lomaria spicant; Desv.; Onoclea spicant; Hoffm.; Osmunda borealis; Salisb.; Osmunda spicant; L.; Spicanta borealis; C.Presl; Struthiopteris doodioides; Trevis.; Struthiopteris japanensis; Trevis.

= Struthiopteris spicant =

Species of fern

Struthiopteris spicant, syn. Blechnum spicant, is a species of fern in the family Blechnaceae. It is known by the common names hard-fern or deer fern.

== Description ==
Like some other species in the family Blechnaceae, it has two types of leaves. The sterile leaves have flat, wavy-margined leaflets 5 to 8 millimetres (1/4 to 3/8 in) wide, while the fertile leaves have much narrower leaflets, each with two thick rows of sori on the underside.

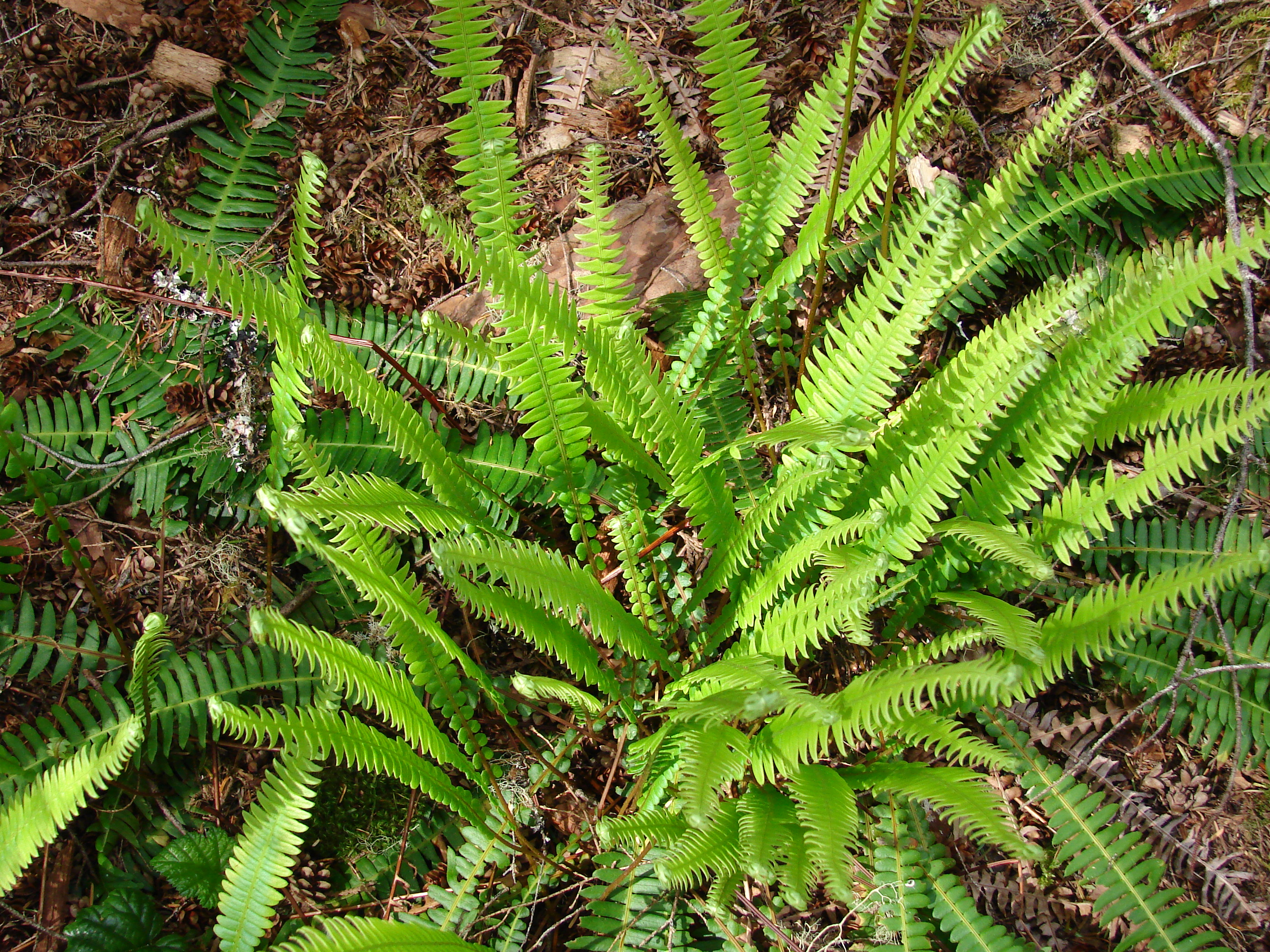
In Mount Rainier National Park

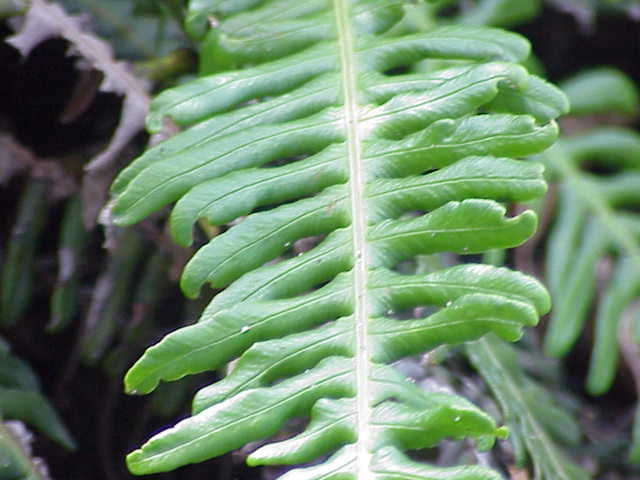
A sterile leaf

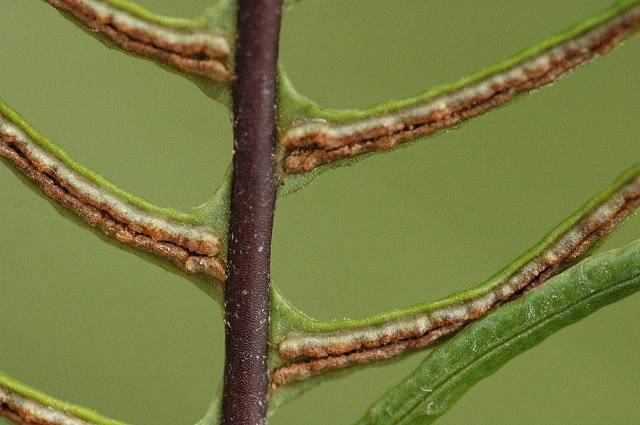
A fertile leaf with sori

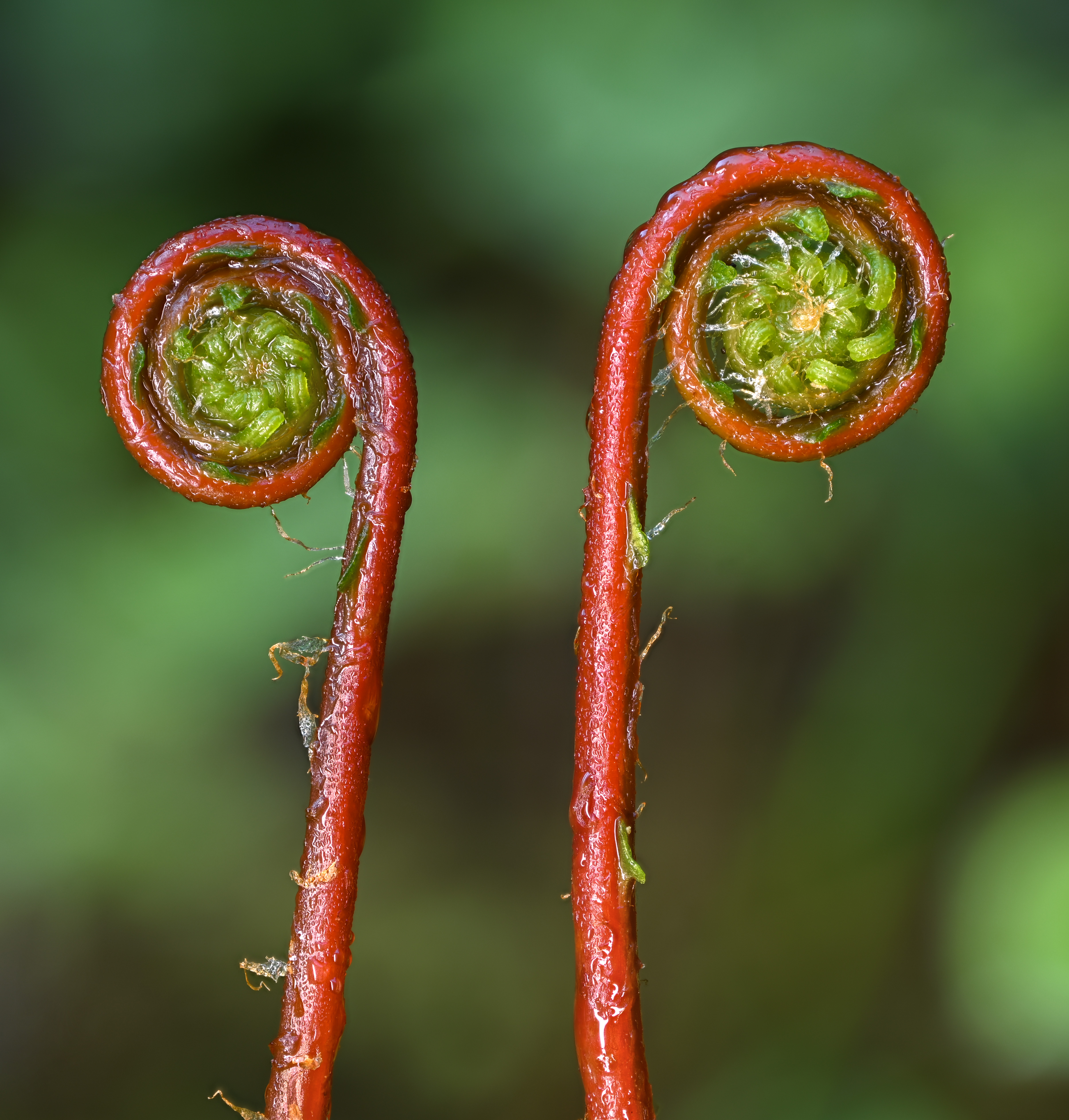
Young fern unfurling

== Taxonomy ==
The species was first described in 1753 by Carl Linnaeus as Osmunda spicant. It has been placed in a wide range of genera, including Blechnum (as Blechnum spicant). In the Pteridophyte Phylogeny Group classification of 2016 (PPG I), it is placed in the genus Struthiopteris, in the subfamily Blechnoideae.

The Latin specific epithet spicant is of uncertain origin, possibly referring to a tufted or spiky habit.

== Distribution and habitat ==
It is native to Europe, western Asia, northern Africa, and western North America.

S. spicant is hardy down to −20 °C (−4 °F) and evergreen, growing to 0.5 m (1 ft 8 in).

== Uses ==
The root, shoots and leaves can be cooked as famine food.

It has gained the Royal Horticultural Society's Award of Garden Merit.
