= Varmaland =

Village in Iceland

Coordinates: 64°41′18″N 21°35′46″W

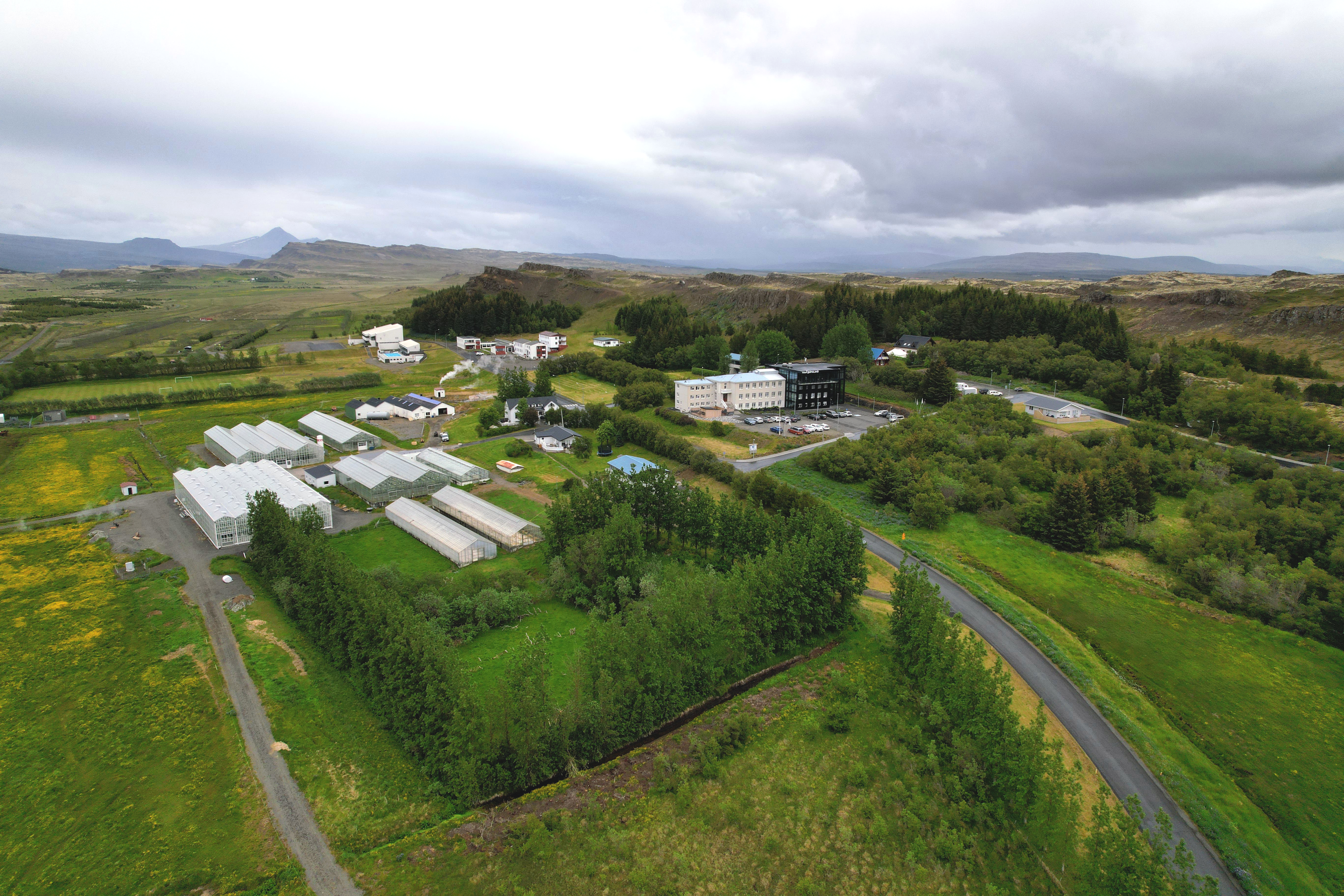
Varmaland

Varmaland (Icelandic pronunciation: [ˈvarmaˌlant], "warm land") is a village in Stafholtstungur, in the Borgarfjörður region of Iceland.

For many years Varmaland was a Women's college and center for teaching of cookery and domestic skills for young aspiring home makers. Spread across the Varmaland grounds and college lawns are a variety of geothermal spring openings and geysers set in low mounds. The three biggest geysers are Veggjalaug, Minnihver and Kvennaskólahver, all of which have had their geothermal power harnessed for use of their very hot water as well as for the central heating of the Varmaland swimming pool, community center, college and, of course the local green houses.
