= Borgarfjarðarbrú =

Bridge in Iceland

Coordinates: 64.5336630°N 21.8924260°W

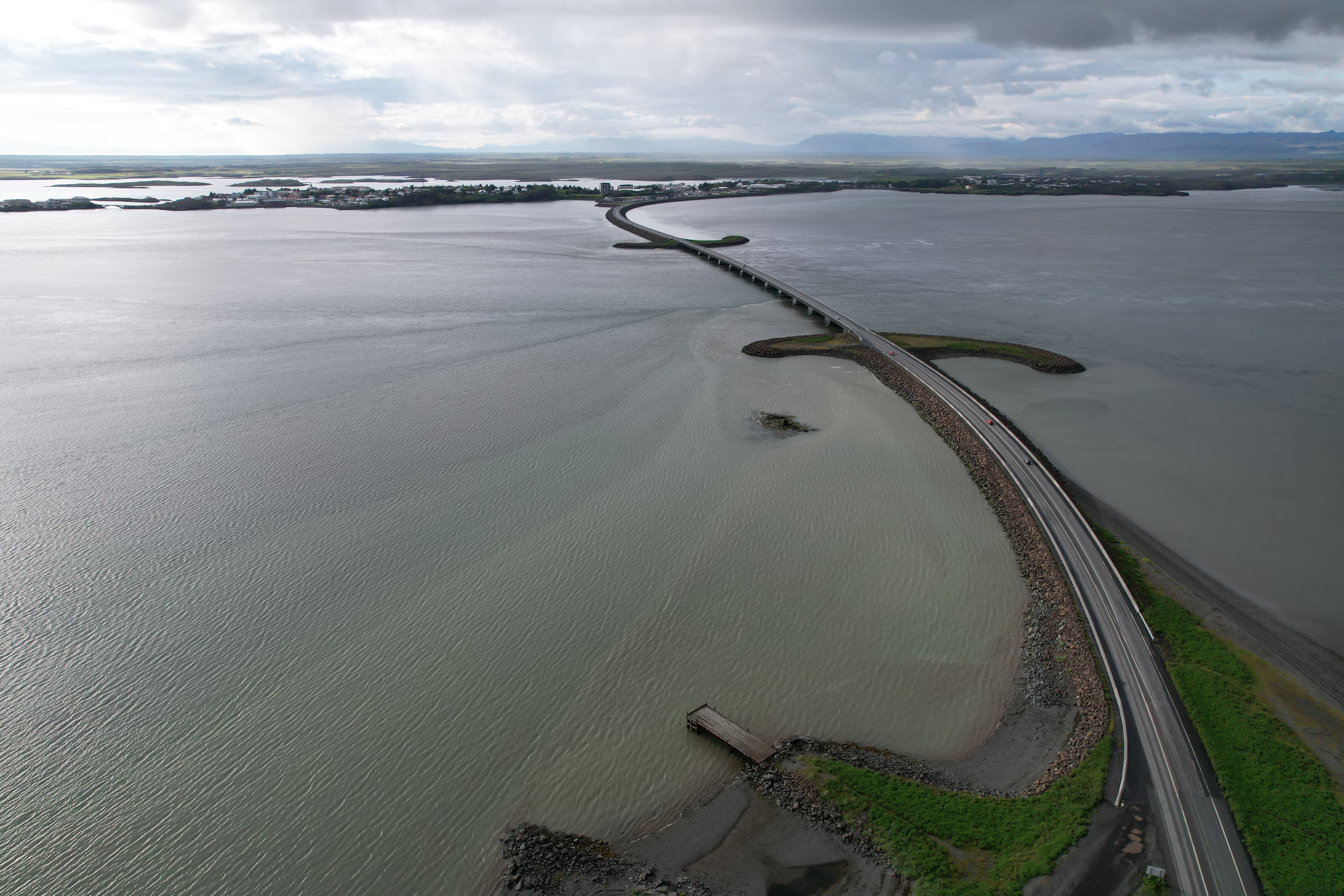
Aerial photograph showing Borgarfjarðarbrú and Borgarnes in the background

Borgarfjarðarbrú (Icelandic pronunciation: [ˈpɔrkarˌfjarðarˌpruː], "Borgarfjörður bridge") is the second longest bridge in Iceland, after Skeiðarárbrú. It spans Borgarfjörður, linking Borgarnes to Route 1 (the Ring Road) and connecting it with other parts of the country. The bridge is 520 m long and was opened on 13 September 1981, with repairs carried out in 2012. Before its construction, the Ring Road crosses the Hvítá river 4 kilometres (2.5 mi) upstream from its mouth at Borgarfjörður via the bridge at Ferjukot, which opened in 1928.
