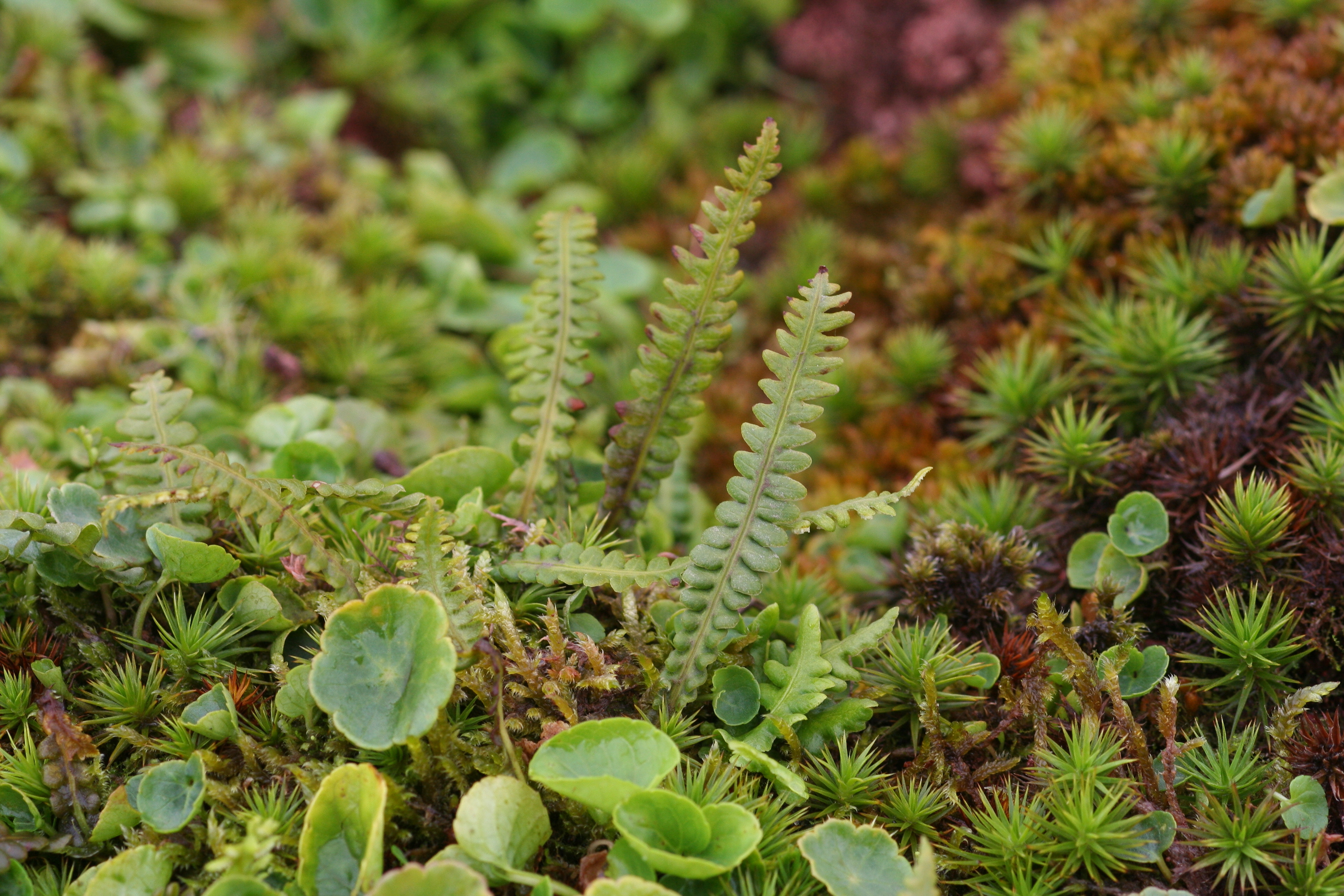

Scientific classification
- Kingdom: Plantae
- Clade: Embryophytes
- Clade: Tracheophytes
- Division: Polypodiophyta
- Class: Polypodiopsida
- Order: Polypodiales
- Suborder: Aspleniineae
- Family: Blechnaceae
- Genus: Struthiopteris
- Species: S. fallax

Binomial name
- Struthiopteris fallax (Lange) S.Molino, Gabriel y Galán & Wasowicz

Synonyms
- Synonyms: Blechnum spicant var. fallax; J. E. Lange; Struthiopteris spicant var. fallax; (J.E.Lange) Wasowicz & Gabriel y Galán

= Struthiopteris fallax =

Species of fern

Struthiopteris fallax is a small species of fern in the family Blechnaceae. It is endemic to Iceland where it lives close to hot springs.

In Iceland it is locally red listed as an endangered species (EN) but as of April 2021 it has not been assessed by the IUCN.
