= Borgarfjörður =

Fjord in Iceland

Coordinates: 64.501°N 22.010°W

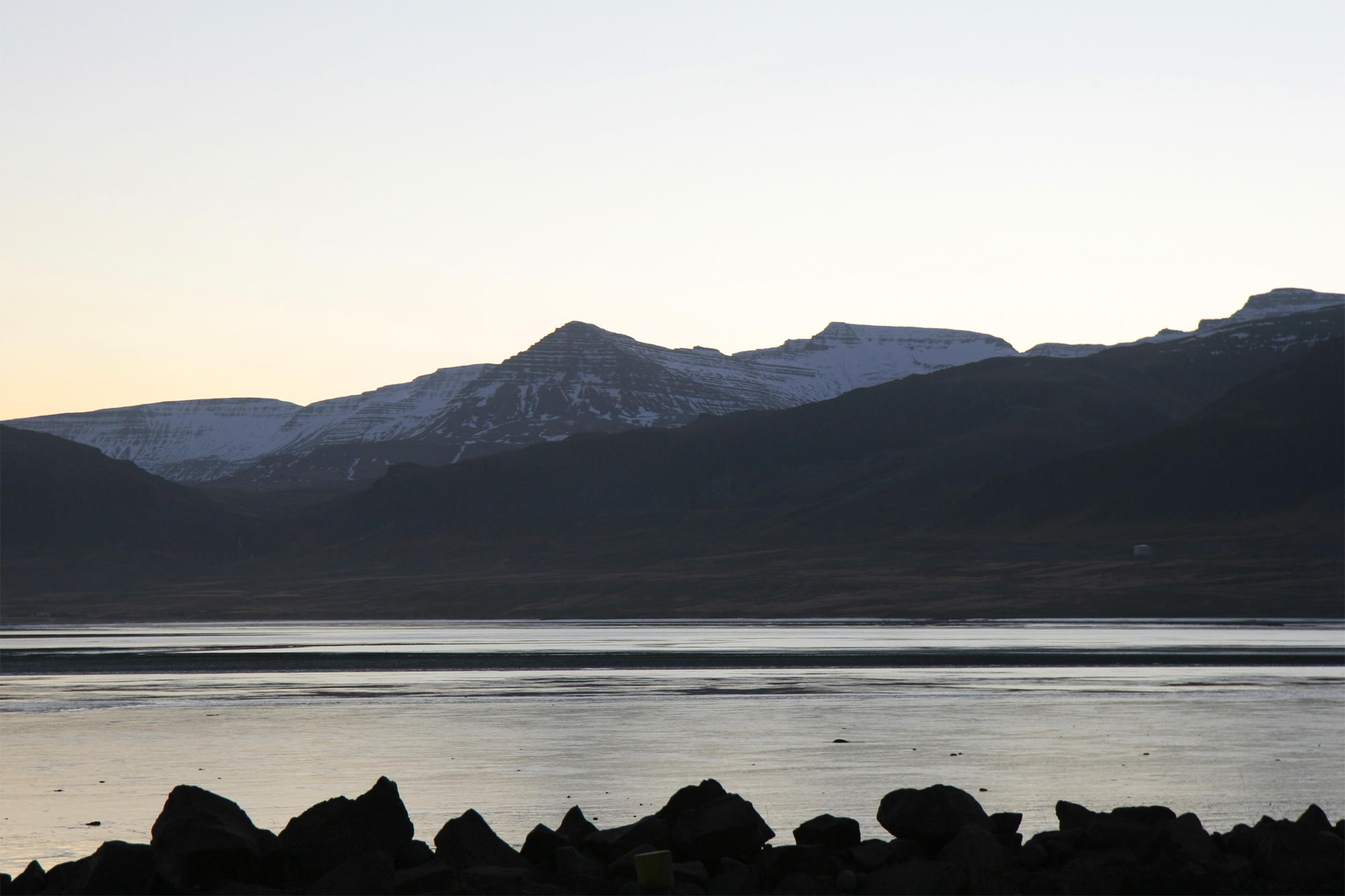
Borgarfjörður seen from Borgarnes, November 2007.

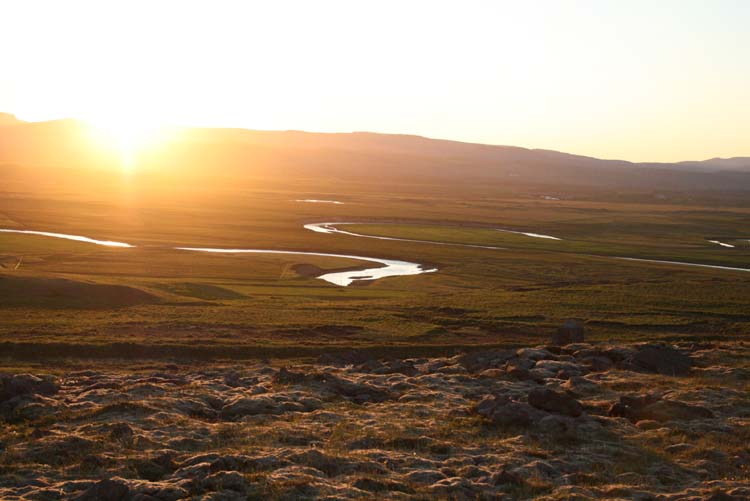
Borgarfjörður seen from Stóri-Kroppur

Borgarfjörður (Icelandic pronunciation: [ˈpɔrkarˌfjœrðʏr̥]) is a fjord in the west of Iceland near the town of Borgarnes. Although the waters of Borgarfjörður appear calm, the fjord has significant undercurrents and shallows. The many flat islands lying in the fjord are for the most part uninhabited.

Near Borgarnes, the hringvegur (road no.1 or "ring road") passes over Borgarfjarðarbrú, a bridge of 0.5 km in length at the inland portion of the fjord.

The land around the fjord has been inhabited since the time of Icelandic settlement. Events in the Icelandic sagas such as that of Egill Skallagrímsson are situated here.

The name of the fjord seems to have come from the farm Borg, which according to the sagas was founded by Egill's father Skallagrímur, who took the land around the fjord and accordingly gave the fjord the name of Borgarfjörður.

While serving as a synonym for the various townships, farms, natural attractions and areas in the region, the various parts of Borgarfjörður are now generally referred to as Borgarbyggð, a name that in Icelandic denotes residential areas, populated places, such as Borgarnes, tourist resorts and attractions, and less populated farms and more remote natural areas. The name Borgafjorður refers to the actual fjord and surrounding beaches as a natural habitat.

== See also ==
- Fjords of Iceland
- History of Iceland
- Icelandic literature
