= Borgarbyggð =

Coordinates: 64.540°N 21.917°W

- Municipality
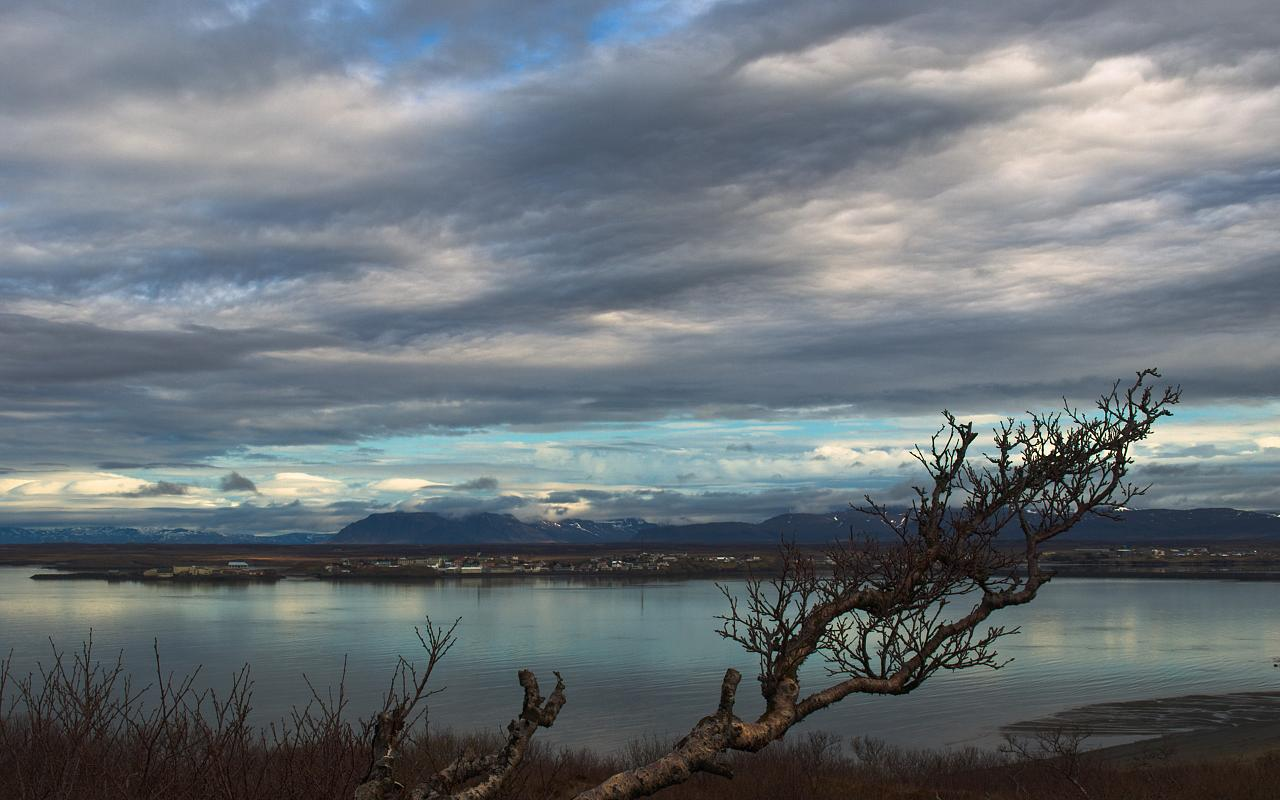
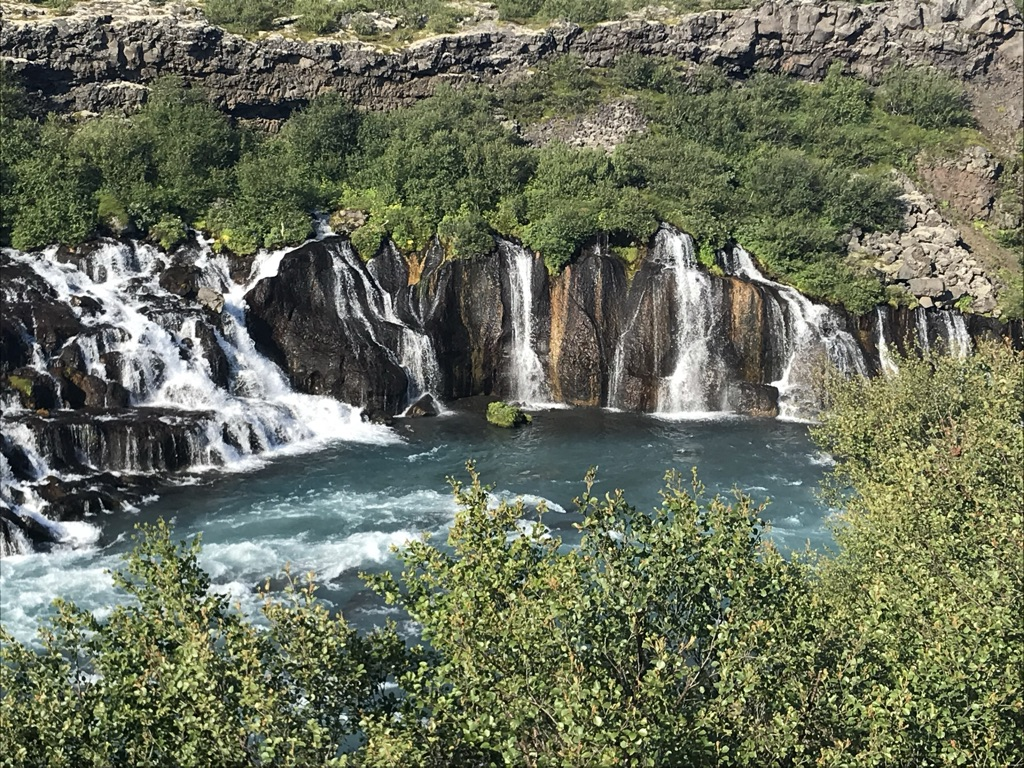
- View of Borgarnes across Borgarfjörður

- Location of Borgarbyggð before 2026

- Location within Iceland
- Country: Iceland
- Region: Western Region
- Constituency: Northwest Constituency

Government
  - Mayor: Þórdís Sif Sigurðardóttir

Area
  - Total: 4,926 km^{2} (1,902 sq mi)

Population
  - Total: 3,637 (1 January 2,016)
  - Density: 0.72/km^{2} (1.9/sq mi)
- Postal code(s): 310, 311, 320
- Municipal number: 3609
- Website: borgarbyggd.is

Borgarbyggð (Icelandic pronunciation: [ˈpɔrkarˌpɪɣθ]) is a municipality in the west of Iceland.

The biggest township in the municipality is Borgarnes, with a population of 1,887 inhabitants. Other densely populated areas in the municipality include Bifröst, Hvanneyri, Kleppjárnsreykir, Reykholt and Varmaland.

== Education ==
There are two universities in Borgarbyggð; Bifröst University in Bifröst and the Agricultural University of Iceland in Hvanneyri. There is a secondary school in Borgarnes, Menntaskóli Borgarfjarðar. The municipality runs two primary schools; one is in Borgarnes and the other has three separate facilities in Hvanneyri, Kleppjárnsreykir and Varmaland. The municipality also runs a music school in Borgarnes.
