= Borgarnes =

- Town
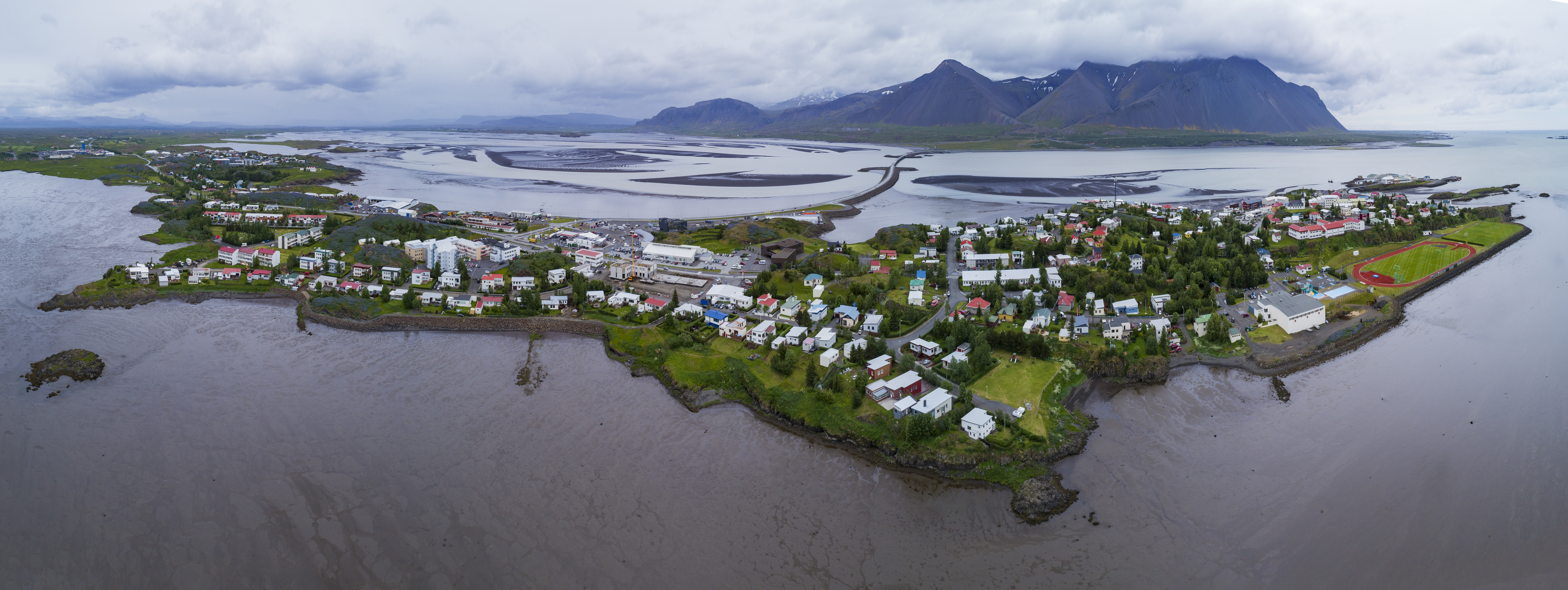
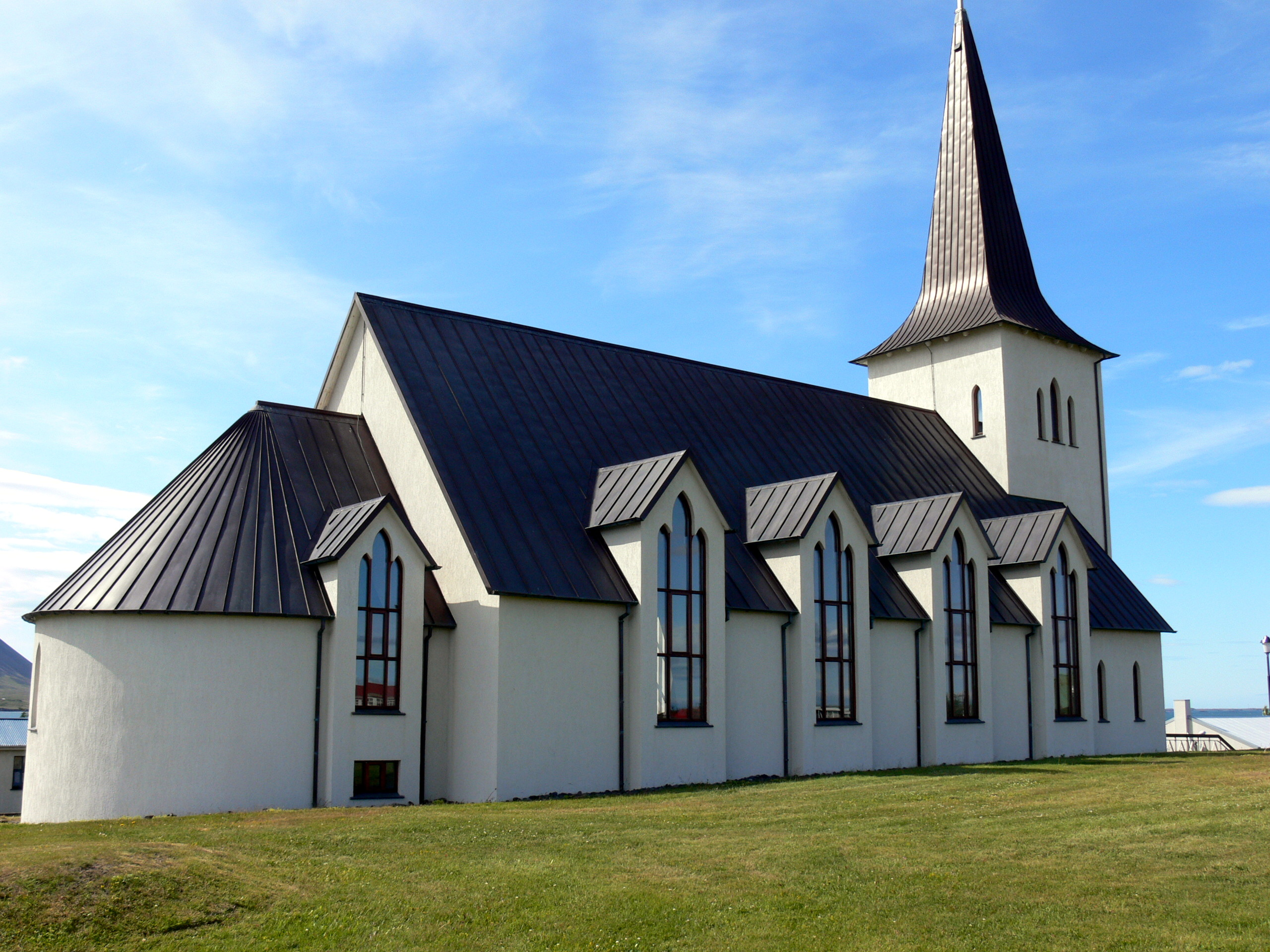
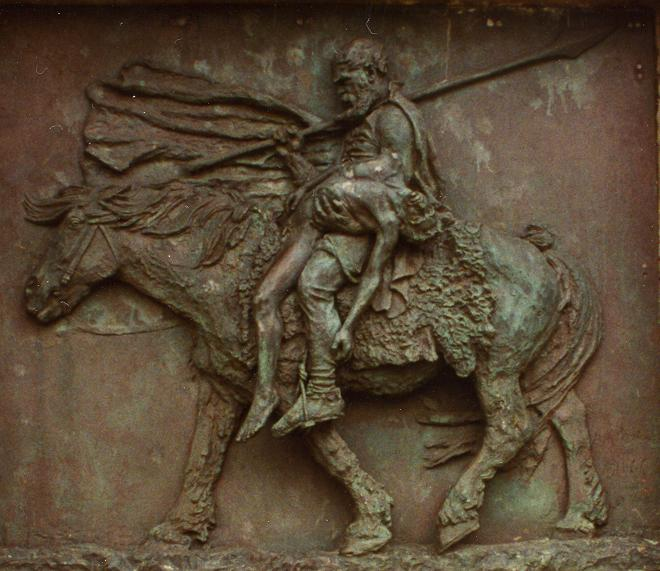
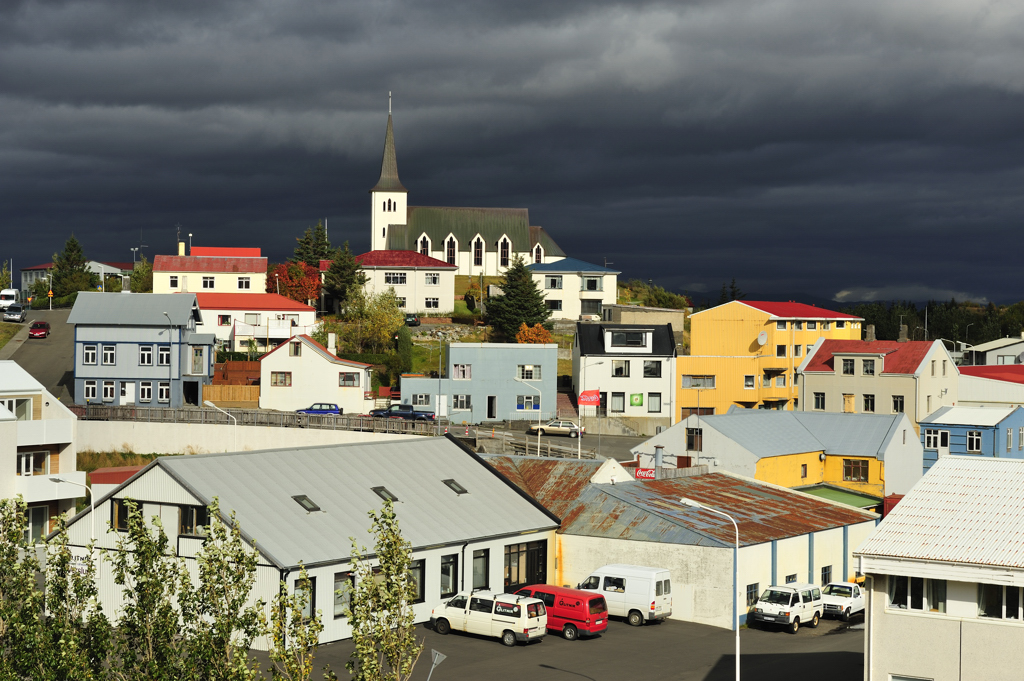
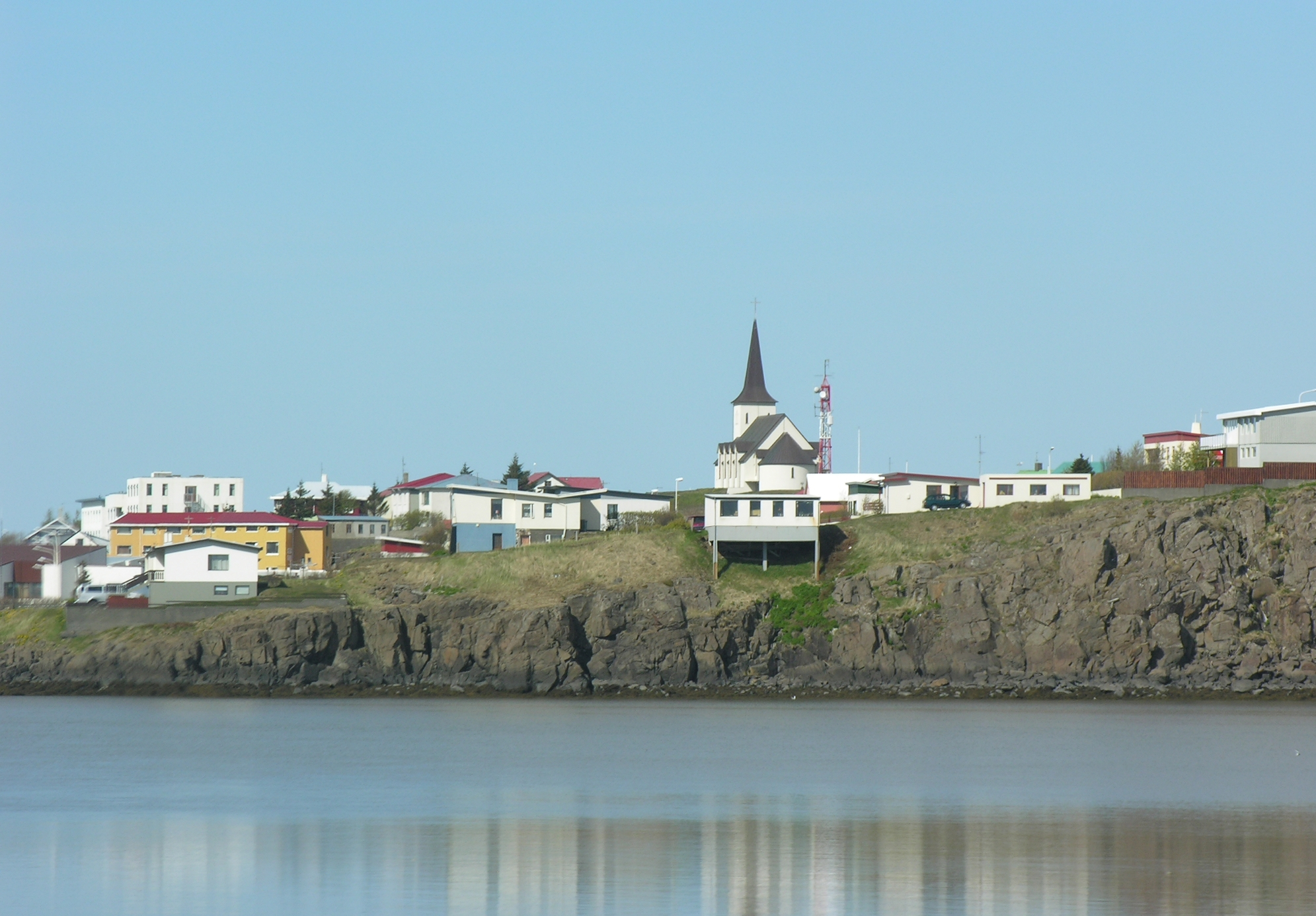
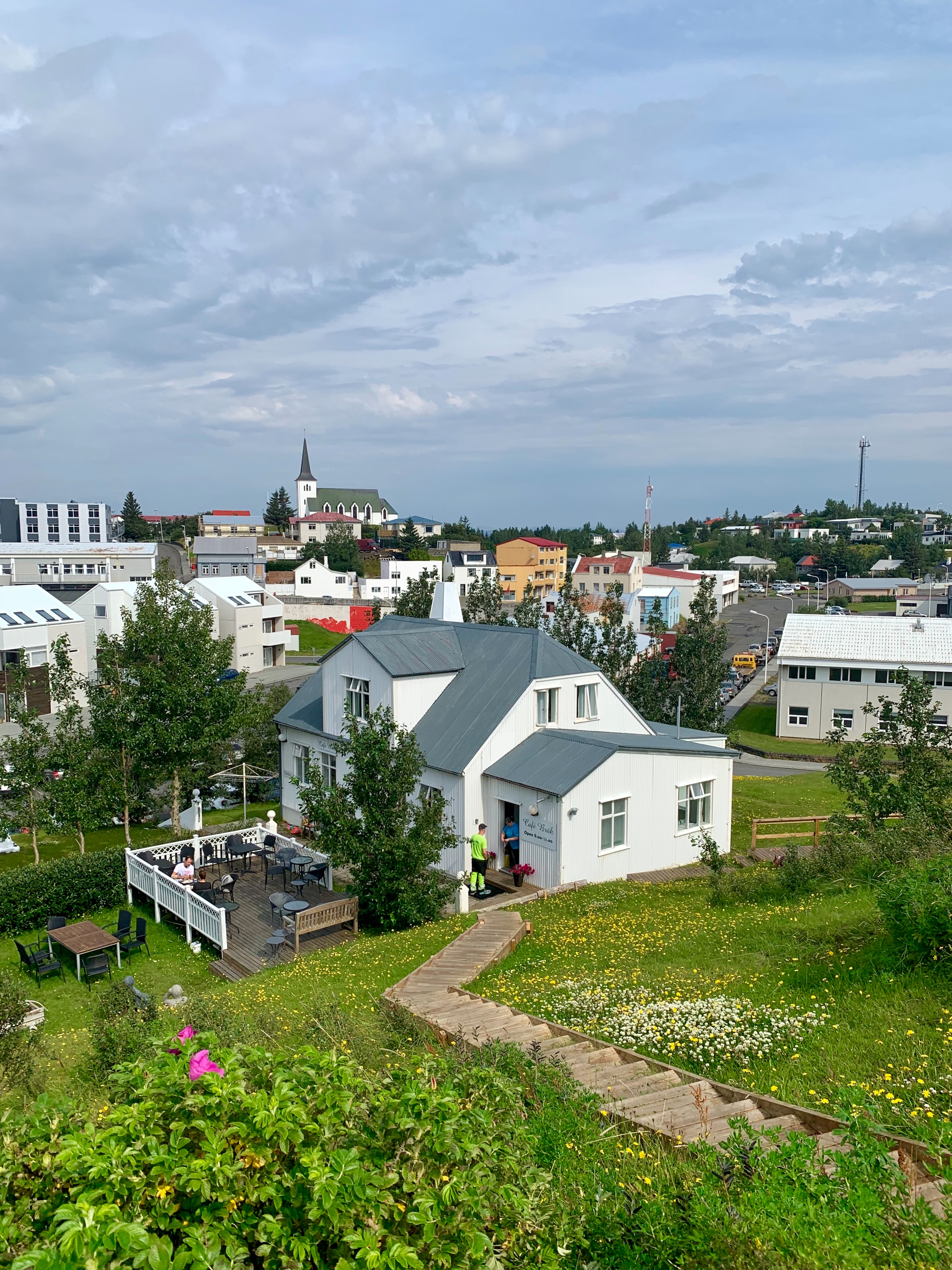
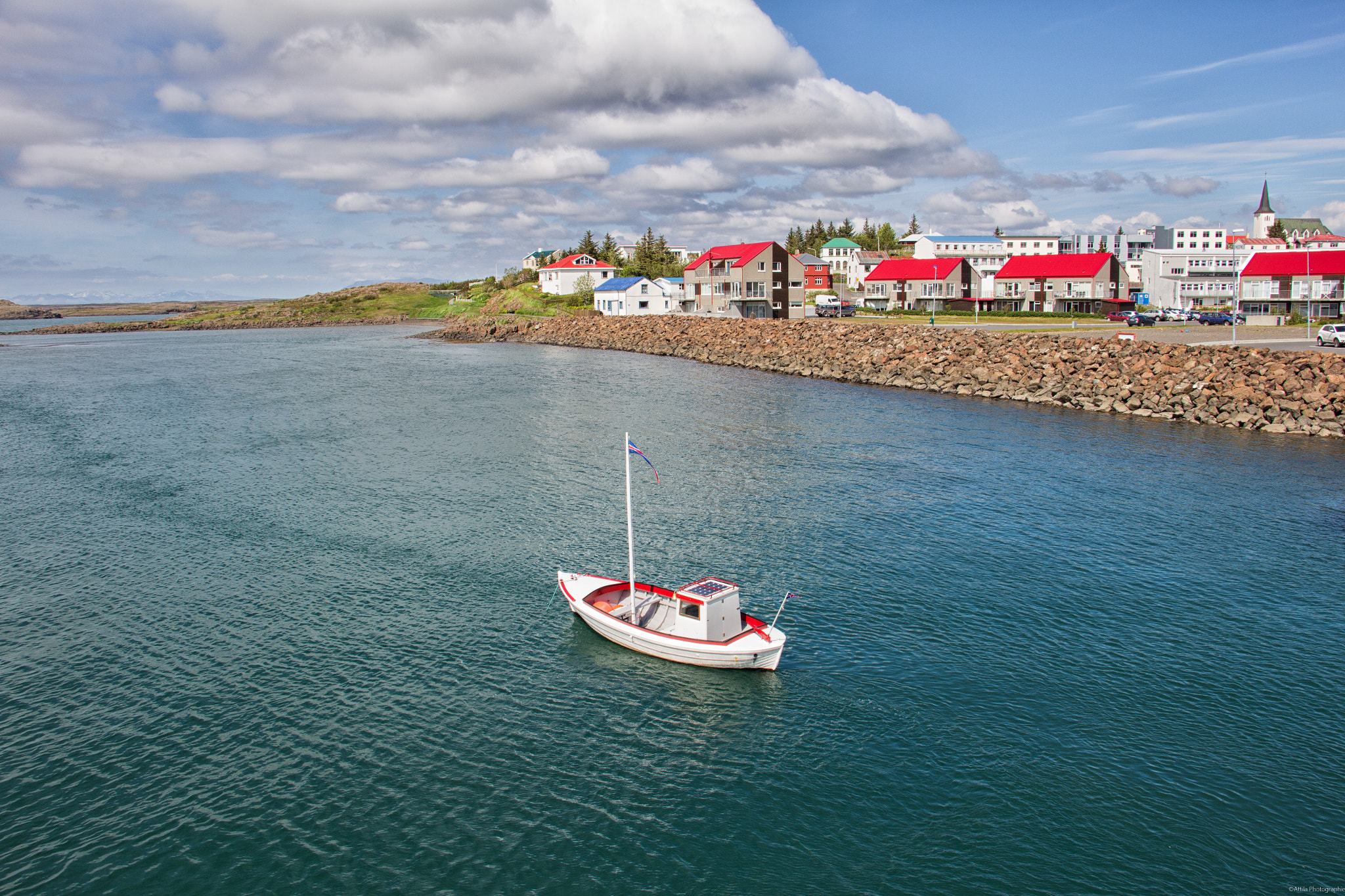
- Borgarnes

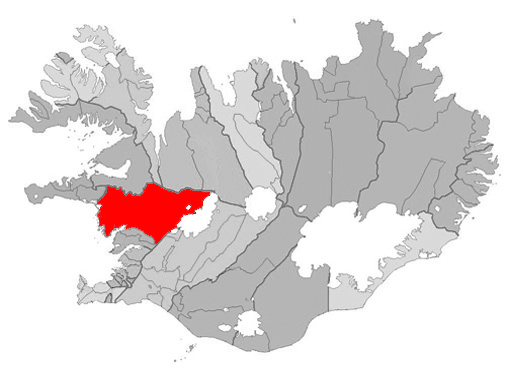
- Location of the Municipality of Borgarbyggð

- Location in Iceland
- Coordinates: 64°32′N 21°55′W
- Country: Iceland
- Constituency: Northwest Constituency
- Region: Western Region
- Municipality: Borgarbyggð

Population (2015)
  - Total: 1,875
- Time zone: UTC+0 (GMT)

Borgarnes (Icelandic pronunciation: [ˈpɔrkarˌnɛːs]) is a town located on a peninsula at the shore of Borgarfjörður in Iceland and is the largest town in the Borgarbyggð municipality with a population of about 3800 residents. It is a main junction in Iceland and the gateway to the Snaefellsnes National Park. Iceland's capital Reykjavík is 69 kilometers from the center of Borgarnes. The second largest bridge in Iceland, the Borgarfjarðarbrú, connects traffic to and from Reykjavík.

== Local area ==
There are four national forests in the region (approximately 40 km from the town center) which are overseen by the Icelandic Forest Service. The forest in Borgarfjörður are mix of birch woods and native conifers. These forests are Vatnshorn [ˈvasːˌhɔ(r)tn̥], Norðtunga [ˈnɔrðˌtʰuŋka], Selskógar [ˈsɛlˌskouː(ɣ)ar̥], Stalpastaðir [ˈstal̥paˌstaːðɪr̥] and Jafnaskarð [ˈjapnaˌskarθ]. Borgarnes has the oldest and tallest of the birch trees in Iceland.

== History ==
Borgarnes was founded in the late nineteenth-century, in a region that served as the setting of Egil's Saga. The town draws its name from Borg á Mýrum, the farm of Egill Skallagrímsson, the saga's poet-hero protagonist. A museum in Borgarnes, the Settlement Center, is devoted to the region's ties to Egill Skallagrímsson.

== Arts and culture ==
The Safnahús Borgarfjarðar is a civilization museum that displays cultural artifacts and historical photos. Safnahús Borgarfjarðar was one of Iceland's first collections to receive the formal recognition of the Saga Council in 2013.

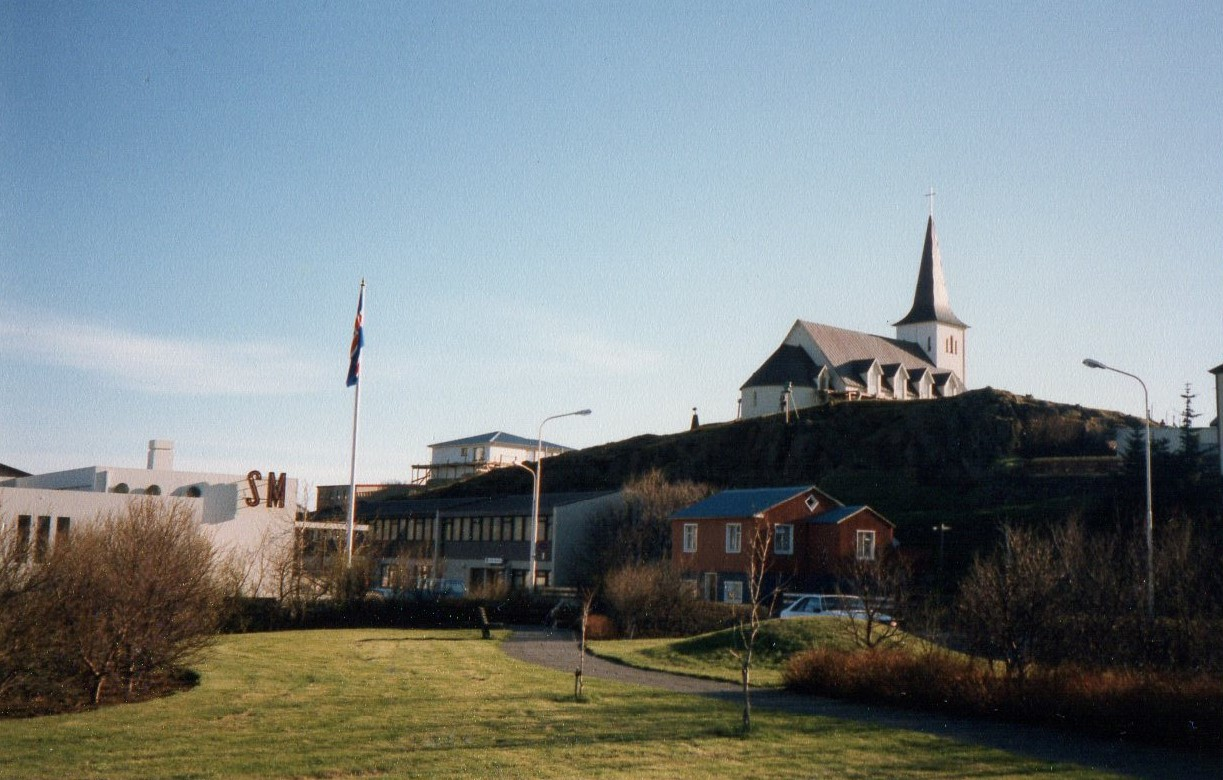
Skallagrímsgarður Park

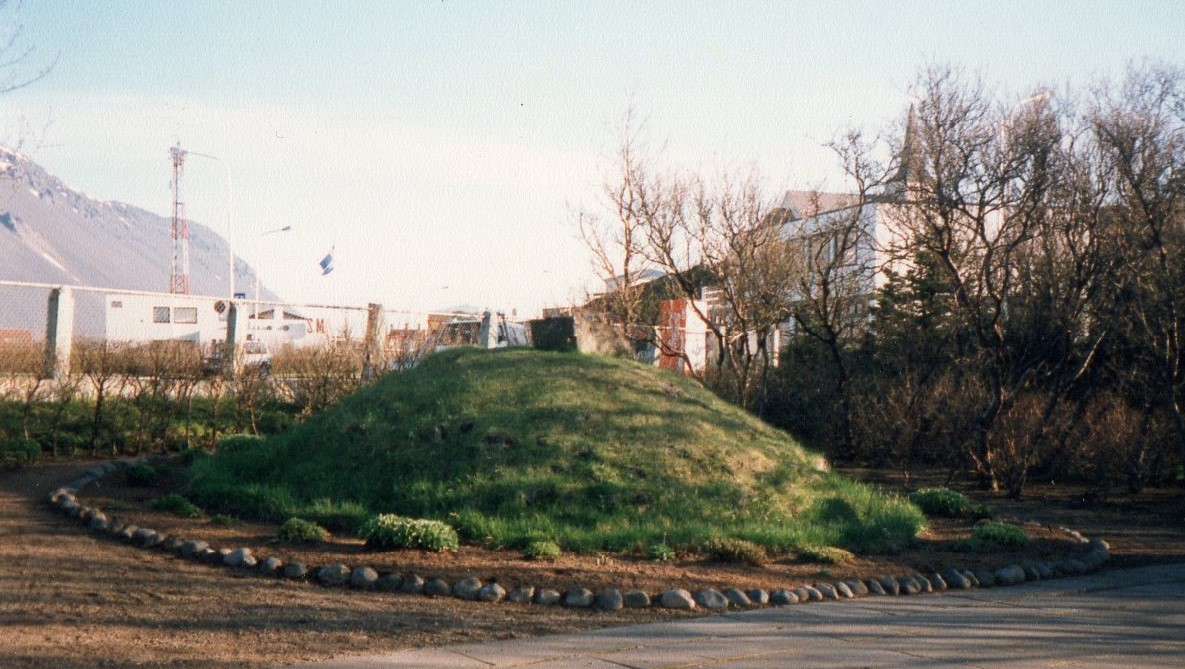
Skallagrímur Kveldúlfsson's grave

Borgarnes is famous for its park Skallagrímsgarður [ˈskatlaˌkrimsˌkarðʏr̥]. A small hill in the park is said to be the grave of a viking hero, Skallagrímur Kveldúlfsson.

Borgarnes is also one of the filming locations in the Hollywood film The Secret Life of Walter Mitty. The Geirabakari Kaffihus, which is featured in the film, was transformed into Papa John's during the filming. Borgarnes is the birthplace of Icelandic composer Anna Thorvaldsdottir.

Borgarnes is the hometown of Magnús Scheving, an athlete and entrepreneur best known for creating, directing, and starring in children's television show LazyTown. He cites Borgarnes as a unique experience, having only 3 other students in his grade at school.

== Economy ==
Borgarnes' commerce is primarily based on agriculture, tourism and culture.

== Climate ==
Climate data for Hvanneyri, 6.6 km (4.1 mi) from Borgarnes (1964–1993)
Month	Jan	Feb	Mar	Apr	May	Jun	Jul	Aug	Sep	Oct	Nov	Dec	Year
Record high °C (°F)	11.5 (52.7)	10.8 (51.4)	15.8 (60.4)	15.9 (60.6)	20.8 (69.4)	19.5 (67.1)	26.1 (79.0)	22.0 (71.6)	18.6 (65.5)	15.0 (59.0)	13.4 (56.1)	11.8 (53.2)	26.1 (79.0)
Mean daily maximum °C (°F)	1.1 (34.0)	2.1 (35.8)	2.4 (36.3)	5.1 (41.2)	9.2 (48.6)	12.1 (53.8)	13.6 (56.5)	13.1 (55.6)	9.7 (49.5)	6.0 (42.8)	2.8 (37.0)	1.5 (34.7)	6.6 (43.8)
Daily mean °C (°F)	−2.3 (27.9)	−1.1 (30.0)	−0.8 (30.6)	1.9 (35.4)	5.6 (42.1)	8.6 (47.5)	10.3 (50.5)	9.7 (49.5)	6.4 (43.5)	3.0 (37.4)	−0.2 (31.6)	−1.9 (28.6)	3.3 (37.9)
Mean daily minimum °C (°F)	−6.1 (21.0)	−4.4 (24.1)	−4.0 (24.8)	−1.3 (29.7)	2.0 (35.6)	5.3 (41.5)	7.1 (44.8)	6.4 (43.5)	3.1 (37.6)	−0.1 (31.8)	−3.5 (25.7)	−5.5 (22.1)	−0.1 (31.9)
Record low °C (°F)	−24.2 (−11.6)	−22.0 (−7.6)	−20.8 (−5.4)	−23.1 (−9.6)	−10.1 (13.8)	−3.7 (25.3)	0.0 (32.0)	−4.7 (23.5)	−7.3 (18.9)	−15.6 (3.9)	−18.2 (−0.8)	−22.0 (−7.6)	−24.2 (−11.6)
Average precipitation mm (inches)	90.9 (3.58)	98.8 (3.89)	85.6 (3.37)	67.4 (2.65)	48.6 (1.91)	53.1 (2.09)	51.0 (2.01)	73.5 (2.89)	69.1 (2.72)	100.9 (3.97)	97.2 (3.83)	100.0 (3.94)	936.1 (36.85)
Source: Icelandic Met Office

== Notable people ==
- Egill Skallagrímsson, warrior, poet and berserker
- Sigurður Páll Jónsson, member of parliament
- Magnús Scheving, athlete and creator of LazyTown
