= Oddnýjarhnjúkur-Langjökull volcanic system =

Volcano in Iceland

- Langjökull volcanic system, Hveravellir (northern-) and Skjaldbreiður (southern part)
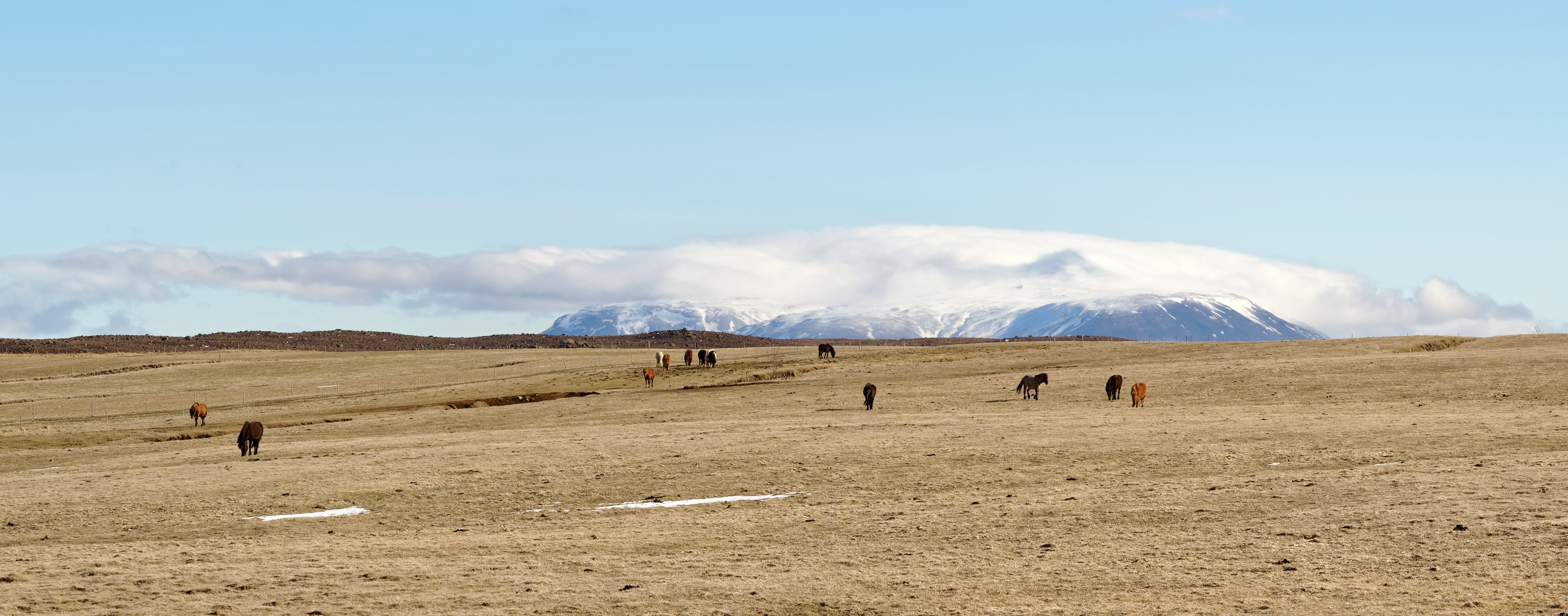
- Langjökull from Route 35

Highest point
- Elevation: 1,435 m (4,708 ft)
- Coordinates: 64°51′N 19°42′W

Geography
- Selected geological features near the Langjökull volcanic system (red outlines, Holocene surface lava flows violet shading with oldest lightest). Legend: Other shading shows: '"`UNIQ--templatestyles-00000008-QINU`"' calderas; '"`UNIQ--templatestyles-00000009-QINU`"' central volcanoes; '"`UNIQ--templatestyles-0000000A-QINU`"' fissure swarms; '"`UNIQ--templatestyles-0000000B-QINU`"' subglacial terrain above 1,100 m (3,600 ft); '"`UNIQ--templatestyles-0000000C-QINU`"' seismically active areas; Clicking on the rectangle in the image enlarges to full window and enables mouse-over with more detail.
- Location: Southwestern Iceland

Geology
- Rock age: Holocene
- Mountain type: Subglacial central volcano with fissure swarm

The Oddnýjarhnjúkur-Langjökull (Langjökull) volcanic system of Iceland last erupted about 3600 years ago and is associated with current geothermal activity. The area of its central volcano is at present under the second largest ice cap in Iceland.

== Geography ==
The volcanic system is located north of Lake Thingvallavatn and its southern lava flows contribute to the floor of the Þingvellir rift valley central to Icelandic cultural history and the fissure system which is up to 20 km (12 mi) wide extends up to 100 km (62 mi) north. The Laugarfjall lava dome on the western side of the Haukadalur valley that houses the Geysir geothermal area with its geysers and other geothermal features is part of the southern fissure swarm. The shield volcano of Skjaldbreiður is prominent to the north of the rift valley with a height of 1,066 m (3,497 ft) and to the north the Langjökull ice cap at 870 km^{2} (340 sq mi) in area and second in area in Iceland, covers its central volcano of Oddnýjarhnjúkur. The highest point within the Langjökull icecap is to its north east where the Baldjökull part of the ice cap covers a tuya of the same name with a height of 1,435 metres (4,708 ft). The geothermal area of Hveravellir with hot springs, fumaroles and mud pools is to the north east of the central volcano in the northern part of the fissure swarm which is dominated by Kjalhraun at 840 metres (2,760 ft). To the west is the Prestahnúkur volcanic system with the small ice cap of Eiríksjökull 21 km^{2} (8.1 sq mi) in area, and to the east of Langjökull is the Hofsjökull volcanic system with the large Hofsjökull ice cap and to its south the Kerlingarfjöll volcanic massif. A large tuya and composite volcano Hrútfell with a height of 1,396 m (4,580 ft) is located between Baldjökull and Kerlingarfjöll at the southern end of the Kjölur plateau between the two volcanic systems which is reached by the Kjalvegur road (F35).

== Activity ==
Currently apart from the geothermal activity already mentioned at Geysir and Hveravellir there have been earthquake swarms to the south-east of the Langjokull glacier and north of Hveravellir. While some of the fairly recently erupted Hallmundarhraun lava flow came from vents immediately adjacent to the north-west boundary of the system these eruptions are now assigned to the Prestahnúkur volcanic system. (Note: The global volcanism program has maintained as of 2024 the Hallmundarhraun lava flow's historic assignment to the Oddnýjarhnjúkur-Langjökull system which could cause confusion as this erupted after the settlement of Iceland in 950 AD and is compositionally distinct. Other references were used to assign the most recent eruption of system to 3600 years ago.)

== Geology ==
The Oddnýjarhnjúkur-Langjökull volcanic system is mountainous as it has ice age subglacially erupted tuyas and tindars up to 10 km (6.2 mi) long, with post glaciation lava shields and volcanic fissures with the predominant lava being olivine tholeiite basalt. Only effusive eruptions have been identified. The Oddnýjarhnjúkur central volcano has caldera structures that have at their rim silicic hyaloclastite that formed during the ice age. The oldest deposits are about 800,000 years old.

The Skjaldbreiður lava shield has three lava units deposited between 6000 and 9000 years BP, and covers 170 km^{2} (66 sq mi) with a volume of about 13 km^{3} (3.1 cu mi). It is sometimes considered a separate volcanic system with the southern fissures having erupted lavas with ages between 10,200 years and the most recent Thjófahraun lava field of the Oddnýjarhnjúkur-Langjökull volcanic system of 3600 years ago.

The 7800 years BP Kjalhraun flow to the north-east has a similar area but covers only 11 km^{3} (2.6 cu mi) with its eastern portion broken up by faulting from the Hofsjökull volcanic system. On the Kjalhraun flow's northern edge is the Hveravellir high-temperature geothermal field with an area of 2.5 km^{2} (0.97 sq mi).

=== Tectonics ===
As part of the Western volcanic zone of Iceland which is a receding rift, and the north–western edge of the Hreppar microplate, the Oddnýjarhnjúkur-Langjökull volcanic system does not accommodate currently as much of the mutual movement of the North American Plate and Eurasian Plate as the volcanic zones to its south or east. The Western volcanic zone is an ultra-slow divergent spreading center, spreading at about 7 mm (0.28 in)/year at the Hengill triple junction at its south and with no spread where the Mid-Iceland belt which is the northern boundary of the Hreppar microplate meets the Western volcanic zone at Langjökull. The closeness of the Iceland hotspot to the east is believed to increase the magma supply.
