= Hofsjökull (disambiguation) =

Hofsjökull may refer to:

- The Hofsjökull icecap in central Iceland
- The Hofsjökull volcanic system that contains the central volcano under the Hofsjökull icecap
- A glacier in Lónsöræfi on the south-east coast of Iceland
