= Ok (volcano) =

Shield volcano in Iceland

- Okjökull
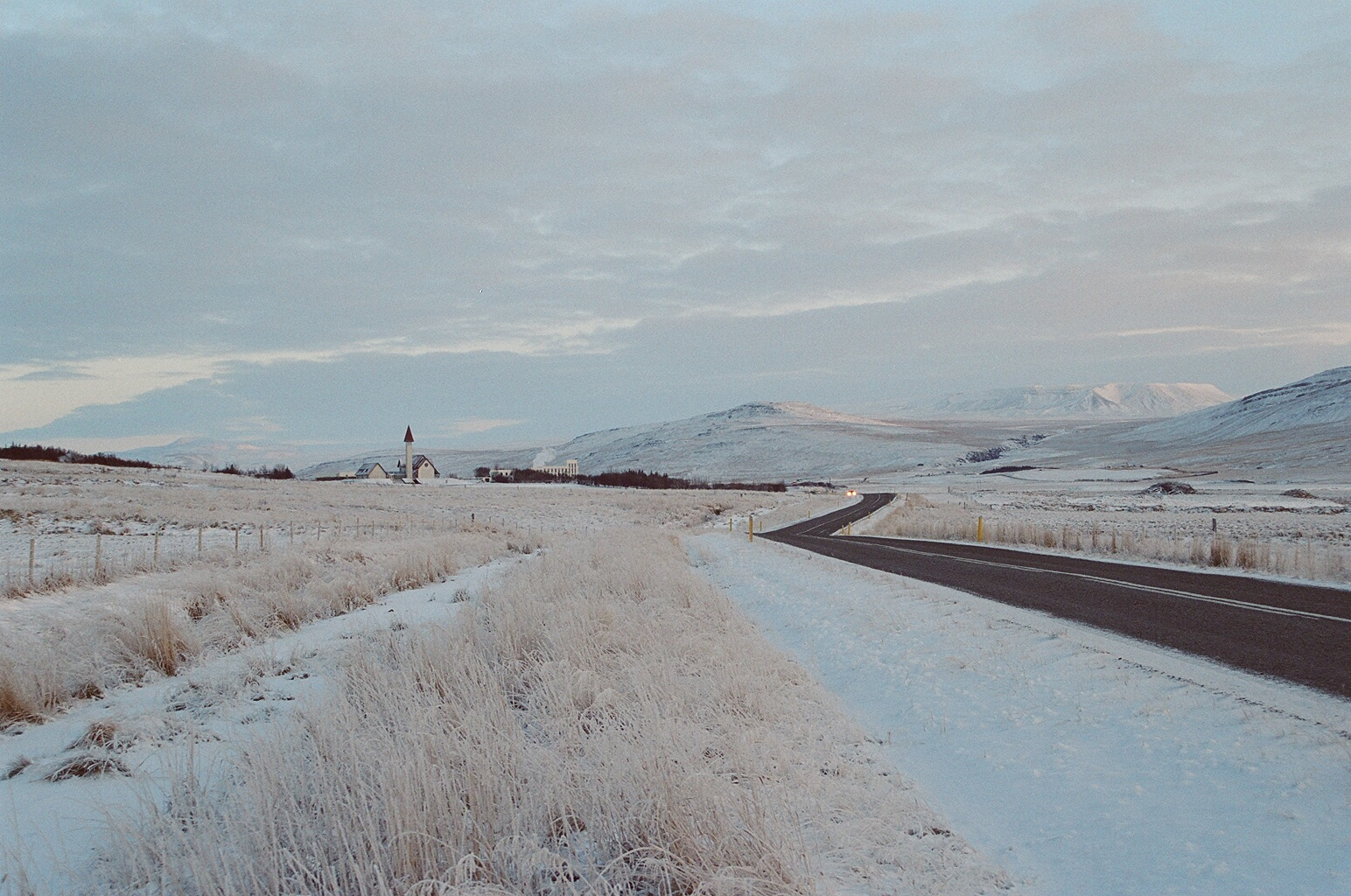
- Volcano Ok (on the right in the background) seen from the Reykholtsdalur

Highest point
- Elevation: 1,198 m (3,930 ft)
- Coordinates: 64°35′53″N 20°52′52″W

Geography
- Location: Southwestern Iceland

Geology
- Rock age: Holocene
- Mountain type: Shield volcano
- Selected geological features near the Ok shield volcano (red outline) and its lava field (violet shading). Legend: Other shading shows: '"`UNIQ--templatestyles-00000004-QINU`"' calderas; '"`UNIQ--templatestyles-00000005-QINU`"' central volcanoes; '"`UNIQ--templatestyles-00000006-QINU`"' fissure swarms; '"`UNIQ--templatestyles-00000007-QINU`"' subglacial terrain above 1,100 m (3,600 ft); '"`UNIQ--templatestyles-00000008-QINU`"' seismically active areas; Clicking on the rectangle in the image enlarges to full window and enables mouse-over with more detail.

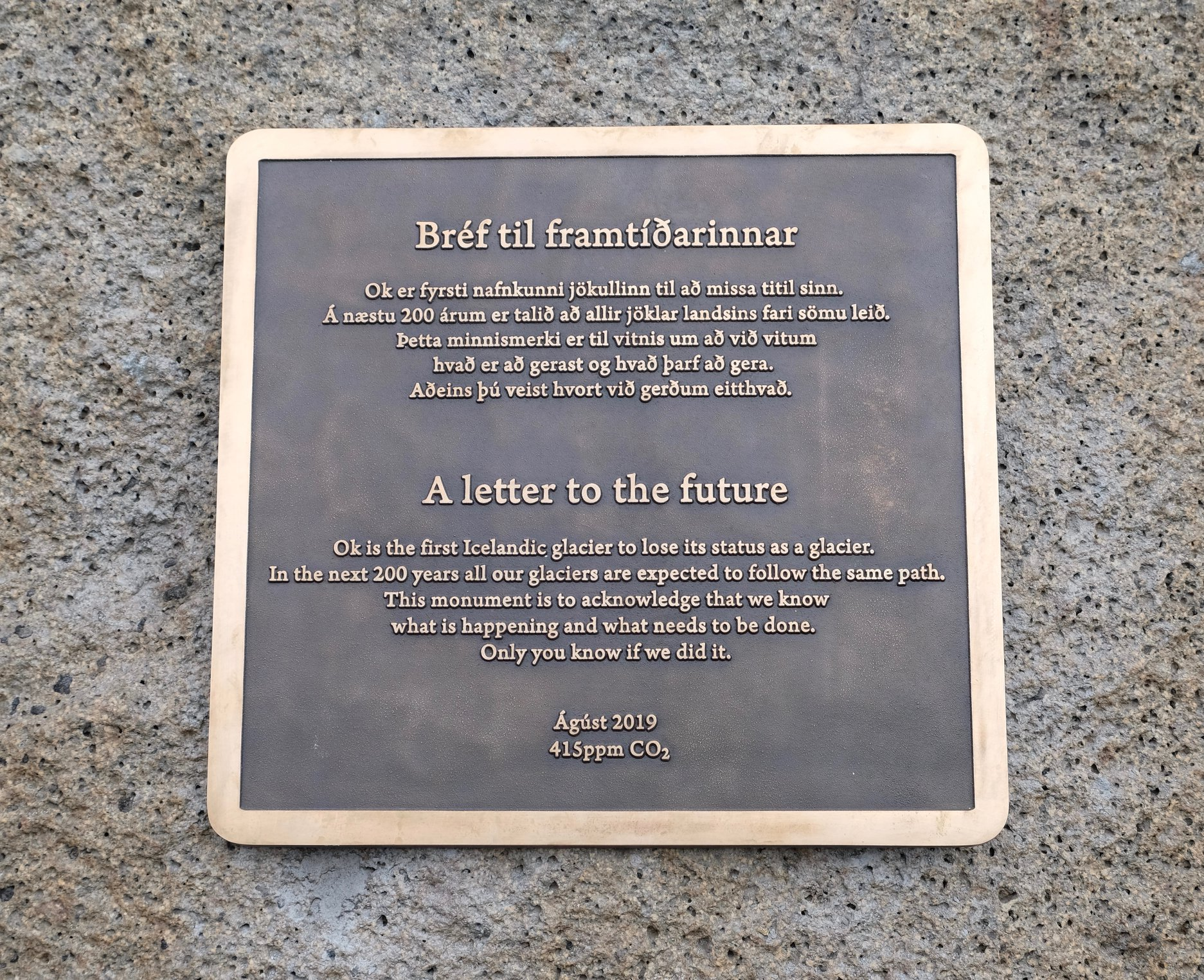
Ok, a former glacier of Iceland- Commemorative plaque.

Ok (Icelandic pronunciation: [ˈɔːk]; 1,198 m (3,930 ft)) is a shield volcano in Iceland, to the west of Langjökull. It erupted during interglacials in the Pleistocene, and is in proximity to the Prestahnúkur and Oddnýjarhnjúkur-Langjökull volcanic systems. The volcano was once topped by the Okjökull glacier, which may now only be represented by isolated patches of ice, even if still shown on current maps. At its top is the crater lake of Blávatn, which can freeze over.

While the volcano itself historically had little attention, its absent glacier has been used to symbolise recent climate change. The lost glacier was the subject of a documentary, Not Ok, in 2018, produced by Cymene Howe and Dominic Boyer. In August 2019, the glacier was memorialised with a plaque on site, the English text of which, written by Andri Snær Magnason, reads:

A letter to the future
Ok is the first Icelandic glacier to lose its status as a glacier. In the next 200 years all our glaciers are expected to follow the same path. This monument is to acknowledge that we know what is happening and what needs to be done. Only you know if we did it.
August 2019
415PPM CO_{2}
