= Society for Cultural Anthropology =

The Society for Cultural Anthropology (or SCA) is a professional organization for cultural anthropologists based in the United States. It was established in 1983, and is one of the largest sections of the American Anthropological Association. The organization is currently led by Robert J. Foster. Past presidents include Marisol de la Cadena, Brad Weiss, Danilyn Rutherford, David M. Schneider, Annette Weiner, Brackette Williams, and Pauline Turner Strong.

The society was created during the "interpretive thrust" of the 1980s, during a period of internal critique and experimentation in American anthropology.

Since 1986, it has published the quarterly journal Cultural Anthropology, which is currently edited by Dominic Boyer, James Faubion, and Cymene Howe. Cultural Anthropology is one of the top ten highest ranked journals in the field of anthropology In 2014, the journal became the first published by the American Anthropological Association to become an Open Access publication. Associated with the journal are the official blog and podcast of the society, "Fieldsights" and "Anthropod".
