= Iceland boreal birch forests and alpine tundra =

Ecoregion that covers the island of Iceland

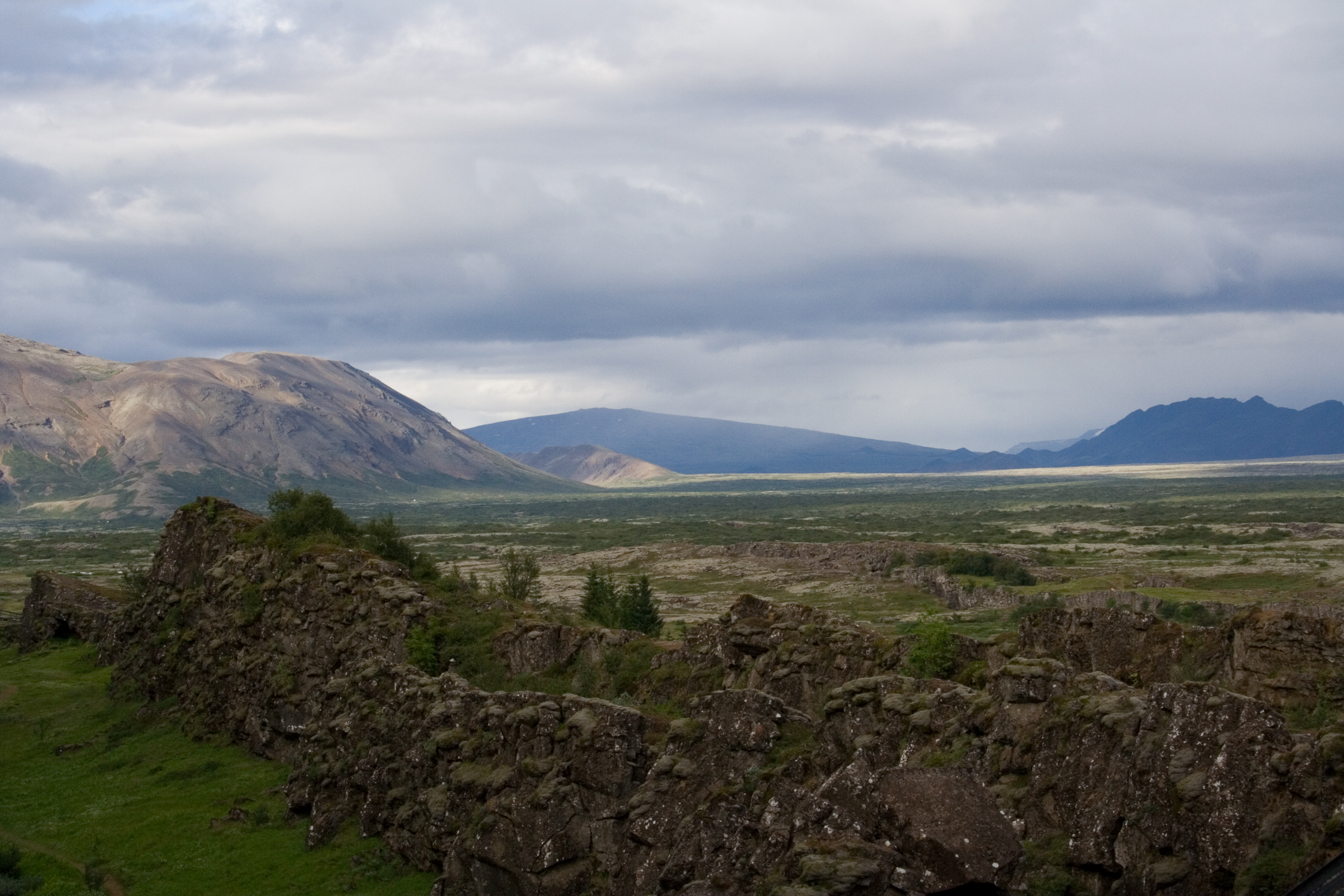
- In Þingvellir National Park, Iceland

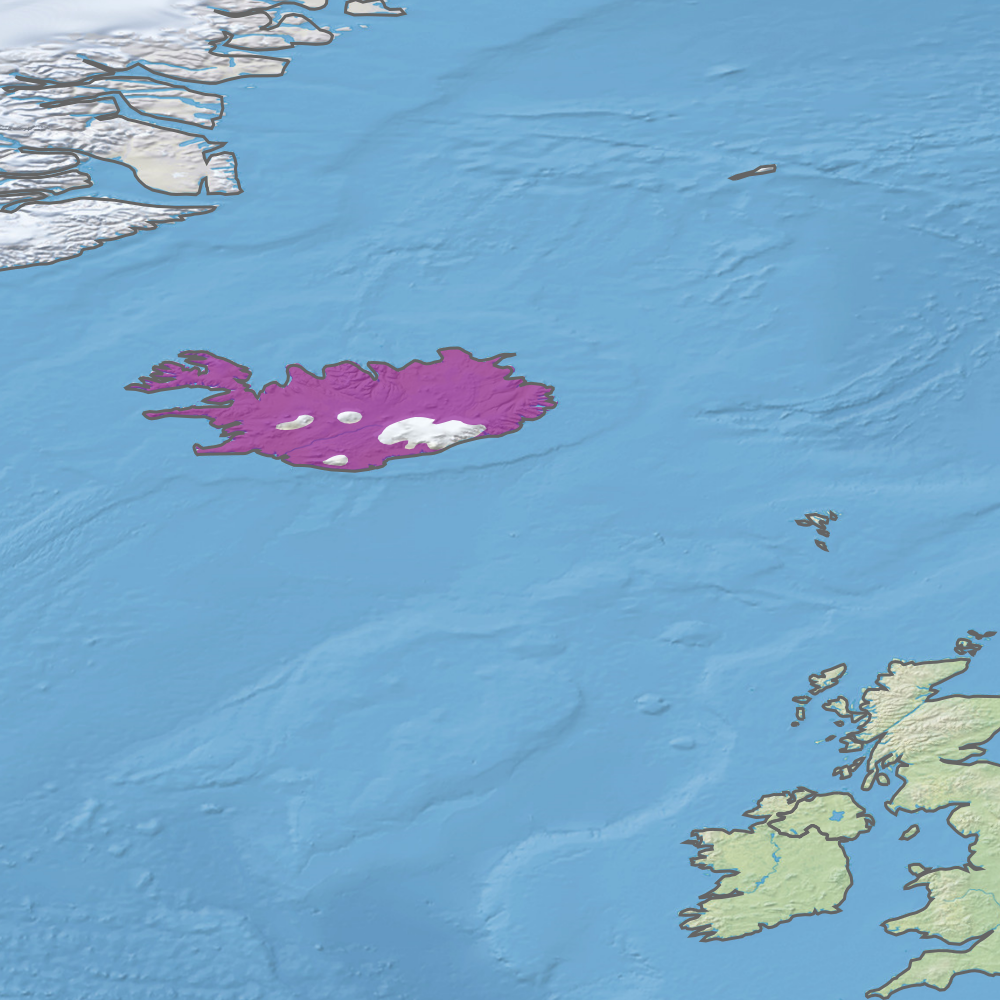
- Ecoregion territory (in purple)

Ecology
- Realm: Palearctic
- Biome: Boreal forest/taiga

Geography
- Area: 91,681 km^{2} (35,398 mi^{2})
- Country: Iceland
- Coordinates: 65.75°N 16.25°W

The Iceland boreal birch forests and alpine tundra ecoregion (WWF ID: PA0602) covers the island of Iceland in the North Atlantic. The island is volcanic in origin with basaltic soils, and the cold northerly climate prevents any significant crop agriculture. Because the island is young and isolated from larger land masses, species biodiversity is relatively low. Forest cover has been reduced to about 1% of the original birch forest by a long history of timber extraction and soil erosion caused by sheep grazing. Blanket bogs (areas of high rainfall and peat accumulation) are common.

== Location and description ==
Iceland is a volcanic plateau rising out of the Atlantic 290 km east of Greenland. Three quarters of the island is above 200 metres (660 ft) in elevation, with steep fjords and cliffs along much of its coast. Approximately 20% of the island is bare rock or glacier, with the highest elevation being 2,119 metres (6,952 ft).

== Climate ==
Because the Gulf Stream has a moderating effect, portions of Iceland have an Oceanic climate (subpolar variety) (Köppen climate classification: Cfc). But most of the ecoregion is Tundra climate (Köppen climate classification: ET), a local climate in which at least one month has an average temperature high enough to melt snow (0 °C (32 °F)), but no month with an average temperature in excess of 10 °C (50 °F). Precipitation is lowest in the north, as little as 500 mm/year, and highest in the south with up to 3,500 mm/year in places.

== Flora and fauna ==
Continuous vegetation covers approximately 25% of the island, 16,000 km^{2} of which is dryland vegetation and 10,000 km^{2} of wetlands. About 1,360 km^{2} is employed in crop agriculture, and about 1,250 km2 of the original white birch (Betula pubescens) forest remains. Another 60,000 km2 is sparsely or very sparsely covered in vegetation. Most of the birch is shrub-like and under 2 meters tall. About 2% of the forest features trees 8-12 meters tall, mostly in valleys in the north, east and south. Besides birch, there are some stands of rowan (Sorbus aucuparia) and tea-leaved willow (Salix phylicifolia). Reforestation projects began in about 1900. with the largest forest in Iceland, named Hallormstaðaskógar, started in 1908.

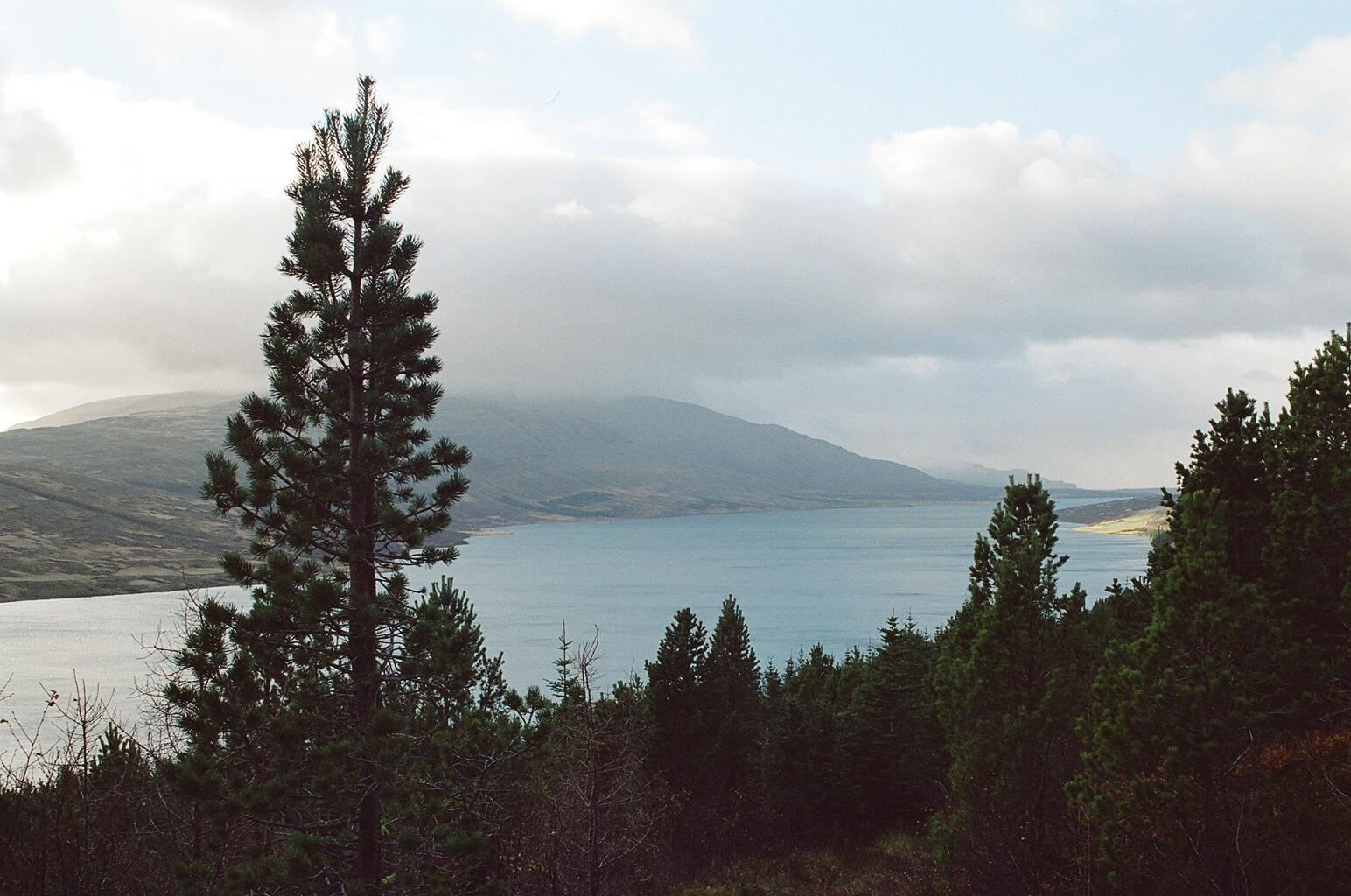
Lake Skorradalsvatn, in western Iceland

There are 483 species of vascular plants recorded in Iceland. The largest families are the sedges (Cyperaceae), with 53 species, and grasses (Poaceae), with 47 species. There are 560 species of bryophytes (liverworts, hornworts, and mosses). The most common mosses are Racomitrium lanuginosum and Racomitrium canescens. There are more than 550 species of lichens, and over 1200 species of fungi. There are no reptiles or amphibians in Iceland.

Only one species of mammal is indigenous to Iceland, the Arctic fox (Alopex lagopus). Polar bears (Ursus maritimus) visit occasionally on drifting sea ice, and there are introduced species such as the American mink (Neogale vison), which was brought in for fur farming but have escaped and formed a significant population. Another introduced species is the wood mouse (Apodemus sylvaticus) which is now widespread in wooded areas.

The greatest ecological threat facing the island is soil erosion. While 50-60% of the island was covered in vegetation at the time of human arrival, the decline to the current 25% has been the result of soil loss caused by deforestation for firewood and timber, and overgrazing by sheep. In recent years, however, the nation has pursued afforestation and soil conservation programs that have stopped and reversed the decline.

== Protected areas ==
Over 12% of the ecoregion is officially protected. These protected areas include:

- Hornstrandir Nature Reserve
- Jökulsárgljúfur National Park (now part of Vatnajökull)
- Lónsöræfi Nature Reserve
- Þingvellir National Park
- Skaftafell National Park (now part of Vatnajökull)
- Snæfellsjökull National Park
- Vatnsmýrin Nature Reserve
- Vatnajökull National Park National Park
