= Okjökull =

Former glacier in western Iceland

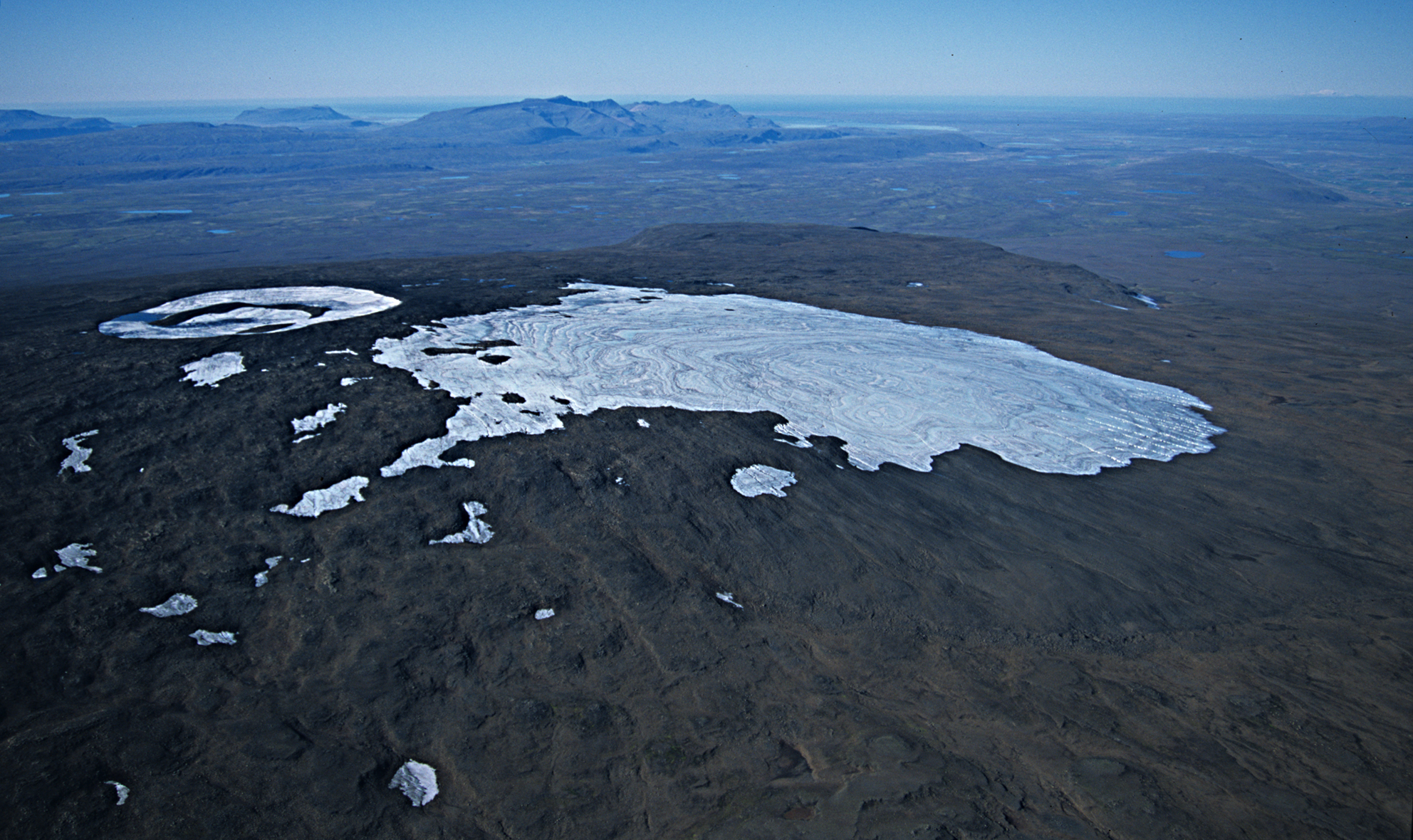
- Okjökull in September 2003. Photo: Oddur Sigurðsson
- Interactive map of Okjökull
- Type: Glacier
- Location: Iceland
- Coordinates: 64.598°N 20.881°W
- Thickness: less than 50 m (160 ft)
- Status: Former glacier

Okjökull (Icelandic pronunciation: [ˈɔkˌjœːkʏtl̥], Ok glacier) was a glacier in western Iceland on top of the shield volcano Ok.

Ok is located north-east of Reykjavík. The glacier was declared dead in 2014 by glaciologist Oddur Sigurðsson due to its loss of thickness. Ice crystals in glaciers collapse under their own weight to form solid ice capable of movement due to central gravitational pressure only when the ice is around 40 to 50 metres thick. By 2017 its thickness no longer met this criterion. Its surface area had declined from15 km^{2} (5.8 sq mi) size at the start of the twentieth century to about 0.7 km^{2} (0.27 sq mi) in 2015.

== Commemorative plaque ==
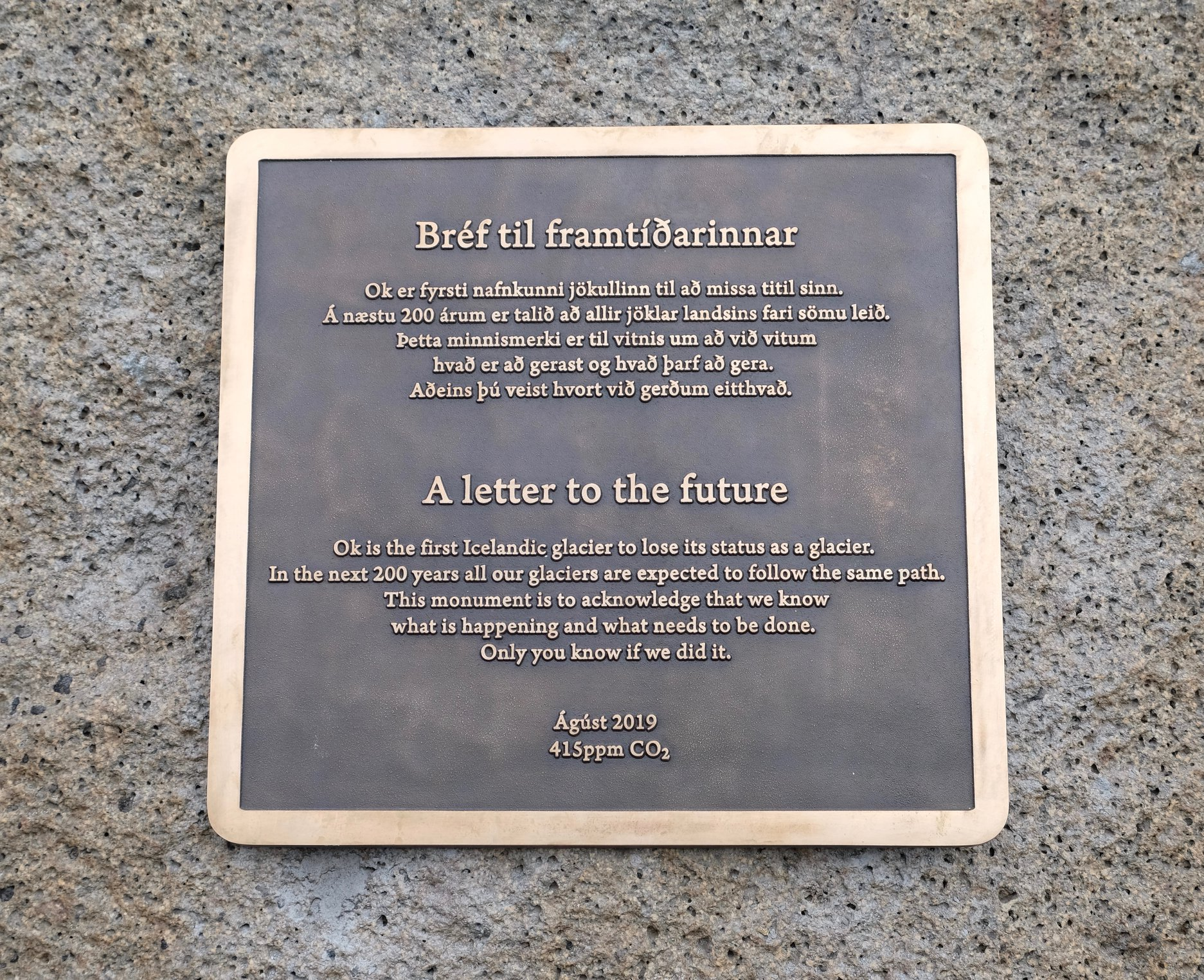
Plaque at the monument

In 2018, anthropologists Cymene Howe and Dominic Boyer of Rice University filmed a documentary about its loss, Not Ok, and proposed a commemorative plaque. The plaque was installed on August 18, 2019, with an inscription written by Andri Snær Magnason, titled "A letter to the future", in Icelandic and English. The English version reads:

A letter to the future

Ok is the first Icelandic glacier to lose its status as a glacier.
In the next 200 years all our glaciers are expected to follow the same path.
This monument is to acknowledge that we know
what is happening and what needs to be done.
Only you know if we did it.

At the end is the global atmospheric carbon dioxide reading for that month: 415 ppm. The ceremony was attended by Katrín Jakobsdóttir, the Prime Minister of Iceland; Guðmundur Ingi Guðbrandsson, the Environment Minister; and Mary Robinson, the former President of Ireland. The placement of the plaque is intended to raise awareness of the decline of Iceland's glaciers due to global warming. Prior to the ceremony, NASA Earth Observatory tweeted images of Okjökull in 1986 and 2019.
