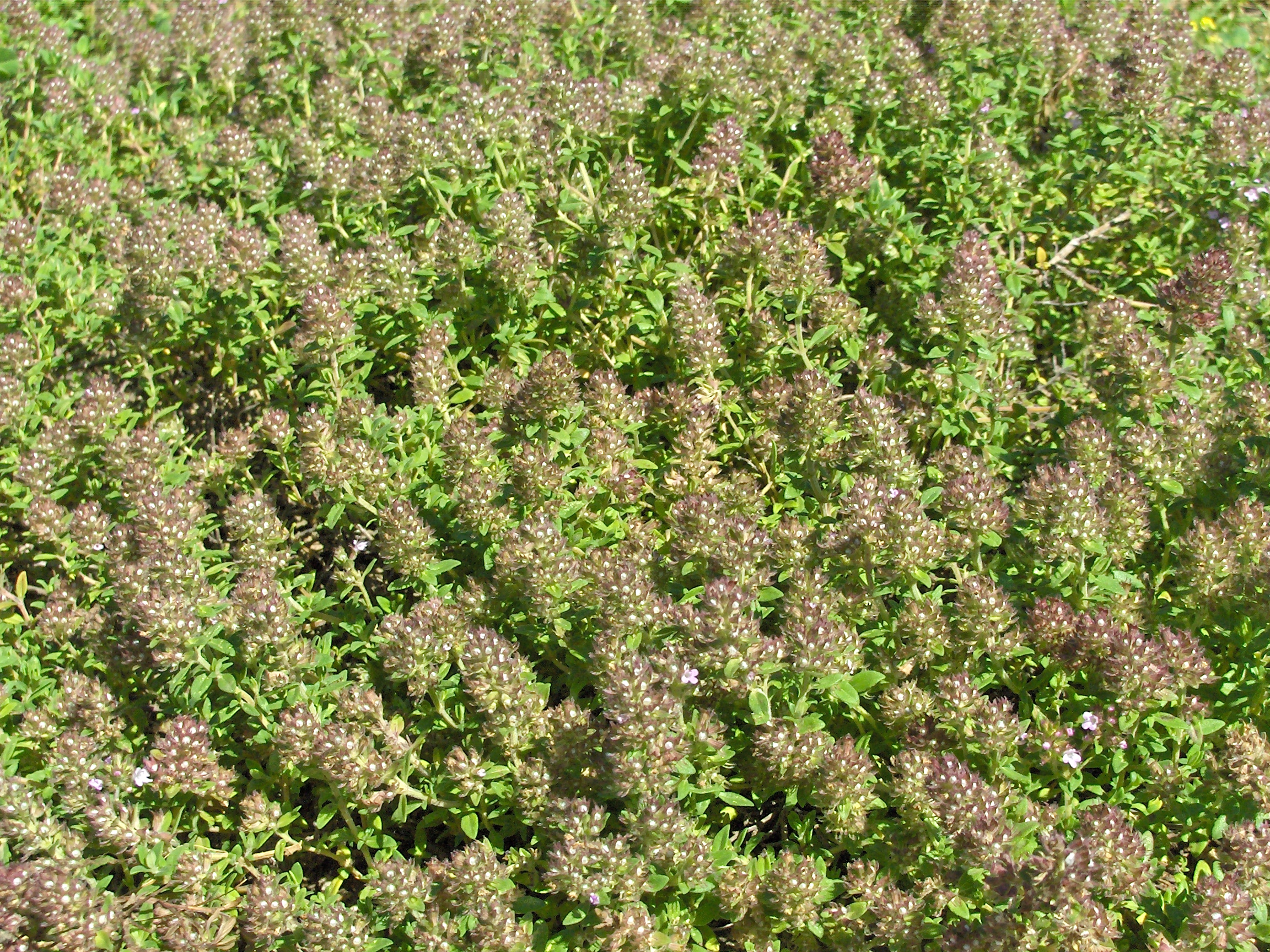

Scientific classification
- Kingdom: Plantae
- Clade: Tracheophytes
- Clade: Angiosperms
- Clade: Eudicots
- Clade: Asterids
- Order: Lamiales
- Family: Lamiaceae
- Genus: Thymus
- Species: T. praecox

Binomial name
- Thymus praecox Opiz

Synonyms
- List: Thymus agoustensis Formánek; Thymus albanus subvar. lumbardensis (Ronniger) Diklic; Thymus albanus subvar. prokletijensis (Ronniger) Diklic; Thymus albanus subvar. schefferi (Ronniger) Diklic; Thymus alpicola Schur; Thymus amoenus Sennen; Thymus arcticus (Durand) Ronniger; Thymus balcanus Borbás; Thymus balcanus subvar. arnautorum (Ronniger) Diklic; Thymus balcanus var. micevskii Matevski; Thymus bracteatus var. penyalarensis (Pau) Rivas Mart.; Thymus britannicus Ronniger; Thymus caespitosus Opiz; Thymus caucasicus Willd. ex Ronniger; Thymus caucasicus subsp. grossheimii (Ronniger) Jalas; Thymus ceretanus Sennen; Thymus drucei Ronniger; Thymus drucei f. britannicus (Ronniger) Cáp; Thymus euxinus (Heinr.Braun) Heinr.Braun ex Klokov & Des.-Shost.; Thymus grossheimii Ronniger; Thymus hesperites Lyka; Thymus humifusus Bernh. ex Link; Thymus kapelae (Borbás) Dalla Torre & Sarnth.; Thymus kerneri Borbás; Thymus neglectus Ronniger; Thymus × opizii Ferd.Weber; Thymus parvulus Lojac.; Thymus polytrichus A.Kern. ex Borbás; Thymus polytrichus subsp. britannicus (Ronniger) Kerguélen; Thymus polytrichus var. britannicus (Ronniger) P.D.Sell; Thymus polytrichus var. drucei (Ronniger) P.D.Sell; Thymus polytrichus subsp. ligusticus (Briq.) Stace; Thymus polytrichus var. neglectus (Ronniger) P.D.Sell; Thymus polytrichus subsp. vallicola (Heinr.Braun) Debray ex Kerguélen; Thymus polytrichus var. zetlandicus (Ronniger & Druce) P.D.Sell; Thymus praecox subsp. arcticus (Durand) Jalas; Thymus praecox f. badensis (Heinr.Braun ex L.Walz) Cáp; Thymus praecox f. borosianus (Lyka) P.A.Schmidt ex Cap; Thymus praecox f. cinerosus (Lyka) Cáp; Thymus praecox var. grossheimii (Ronniger) Jalas; Thymus praecox subsp. hesperites (Lyka) Korneck; Thymus praecox subsp. ligusticus (Briq.) Paiva & Salgueiro; Thymus praecox var. medvedewii (Ronniger) Jalas; Thymus praecox subsp. penyalarensis (Pau) Rivas Mart., Fern.Gonz. & Sánchez Mata; Thymus pseudolanuginosus Ronniger; Thymus reinegeri Opiz; Thymus robustus Opiz; Thymus sacer Lacaita; Thymus sarntheinii Heinr.Braun; Thymus serpyllum subsp. arcticus (Durand) Hyl.; Thymus serpyllum var. arcticus Durand; Thymus serpyllum subsp. Britannicus Ronniger; Thymus serpyllum var. ligusticus Briq.; Thymus serpyllum var. prostratus Hornem. ex Lange; Thymus spathulatus Opiz; Thymus trachselianus Opiz; Thymus vallicola (Heinr.Braun) Ronniger; Thymus vandasii Velen.; Thymus widderi Ronniger ex Machule; Thymus zetlandicus Ronniger & Druce; Thymus zygiformis subsp. albanus (Heinr.Braun ex Wettst.) Cáp; Thymus zygiformis var. mirkovicii Gajic

= Thymus praecox =

Species of flowering plant

Thymus praecox is a species of thyme. A common name is mother of thyme, but "creeping thyme" and "wild thyme" may be used where Thymus serpyllum, which also shares these names, is not found. It is native to central, southern, and western Europe.

== Classification ==
Thymus praecox is in the genus Thymus belonging to the Serpyllum section. It has sometimes been reclassified as T. polytrichus.

=== Subspecies and cultivars ===
Thymus praecox subspecies and cultivars include:

- Thymus praecox subsp. praecox
  - Thymus praecox 'Doone Valley' (recently reclassified as a hybrid under the name Thymus 'Doone Valley')
  - Thymus praecox 'Minus'
  - Thymus praecox 'Pseudolanuginosus'
- Thymus praecox subsp. arcticus (sometimes classified as Thymus polytrichus subsp. britannicus)
  - Thymus praecox subsp. arcticus 'Albus' (white moss thyme)
  - Thymus praecox subsp. arcticus 'Languinosus' (woolly thyme)
  - Thymus praecox subsp. arcticus 'Hall's Woolly'
  - Thymus praecox subsp. arcticus 'Pink Chintz' (recently reclassified as Thymus serpyllum 'Pink Chintz')

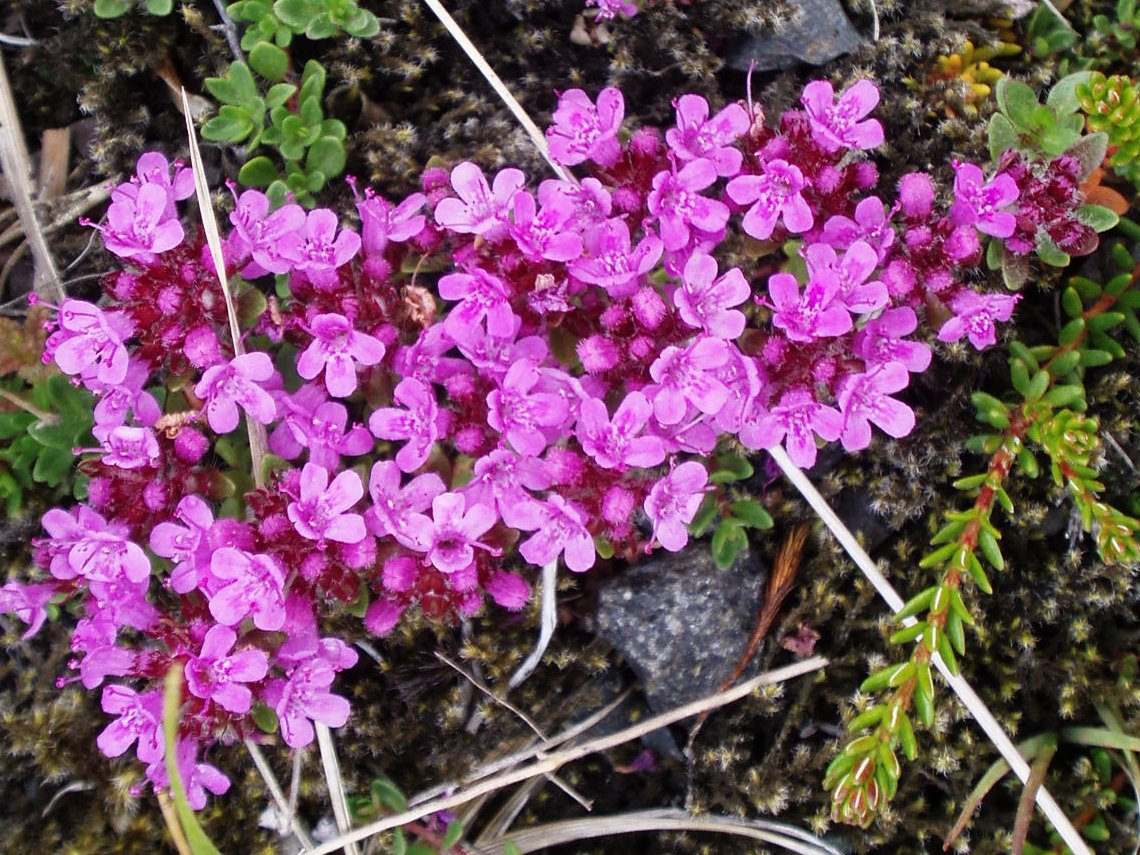
Thymus praecox near Seyðisfjörður, Iceland. It is known locally as blóðberg, meaning "bloodstone".

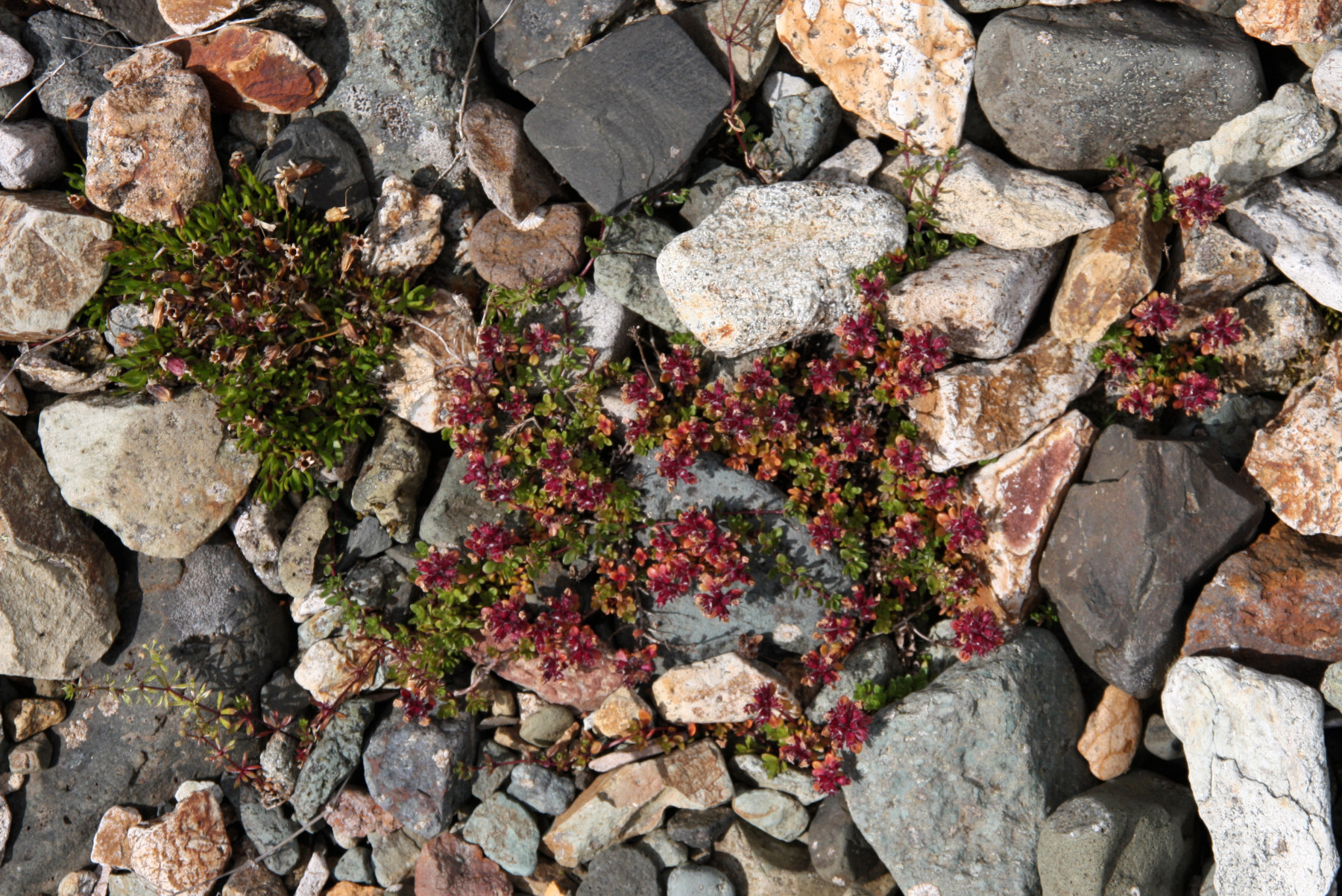
Thymus praecox in July in Lonsoraefi, Iceland.

- Thymus praecox subsp. polytrichus (A. Kern. Ex Borbàs) Jalas. Found in the wild in Bosnia.
- Thymus praecox subsp. skorpilii (Velen.) Jalas. Found in the wild in Bosnia.

== Uses ==
=== Cultivation ===
Thymus praecox is cultivated as an ornamental plant, used as an evergreen groundcover in gardens and pots. When maintained at a lower height it is used between paving stones in patios and walkways. It is drought tolerant when established.

This thyme species (and Thymus serpyllum) has escaped cultivation in North America, and is a weed or invasive species in some habitats in the United States.

=== Cuisine ===
This thyme has a strong scent similar to Oregano. It can be used in cuisine.

Like other species of thyme, Thymus praecox is characterized by substantial differences in essential oil composition from plant to plant. Plants which differ in this way are known as chemotypes and a geographical population will generally contain a mix of chemotypes. For example, studies of chemotypes in Greenland, Iceland, Norway, England, Scotland, and Ireland show that chemotypes span those countries rather than being geographically localized. Some of those areas contain greater chemotype diversity than others.
