= Kjölur =

Plateau in the highlands of Iceland

Coordinates: 64°42′N 19°24′W

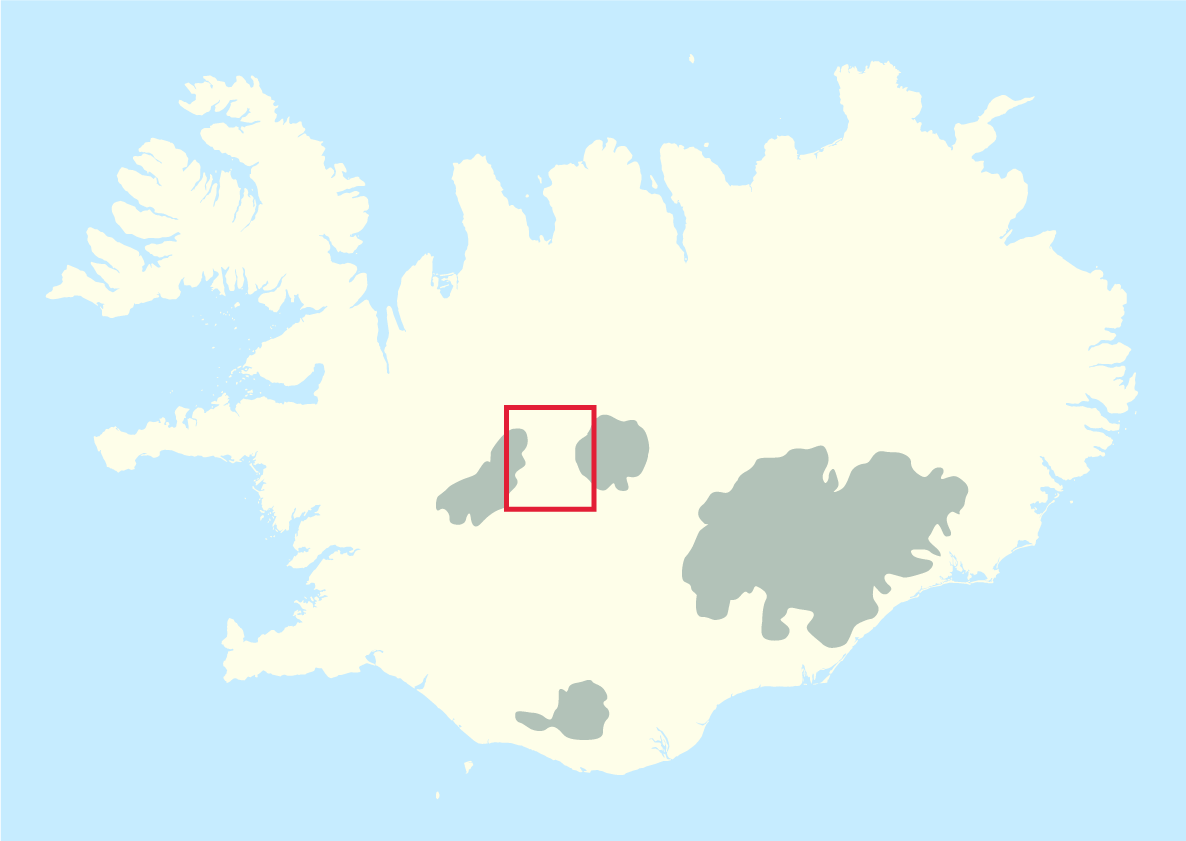
Location of the Kjölur highland area

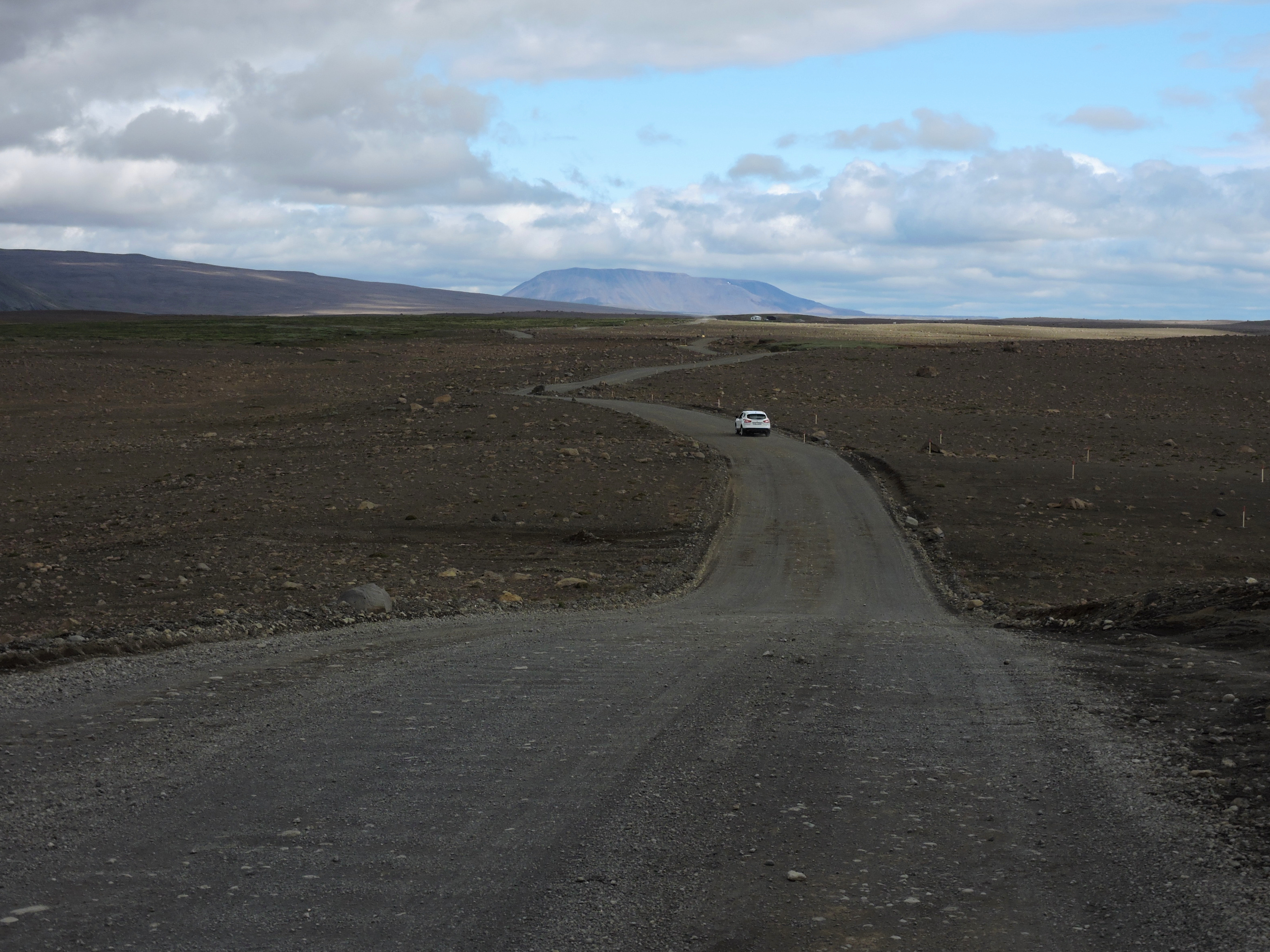
Kjölur plateau and the Kjalvegur F35 road, between Gullfoss and Hveravellir

Kjölur (Icelandic pronunciation: [ˈcʰœːlʏr̥]) is a plateau in the highlands of Iceland, roughly defined as the area between the Langjökull and Hofsjökull glaciers. It lies at an elevation of about 600–700 metres.

== Geography ==
At the northern end of the Kjölur road, near the headwaters of the Blanda river, the hot springs of Hveravellir provide a warm oasis. Not far from Hveravellir, the Kerlingarfjöll, a volcanic mountain range, is situated to the north-east of the Kjölur road.

== History ==
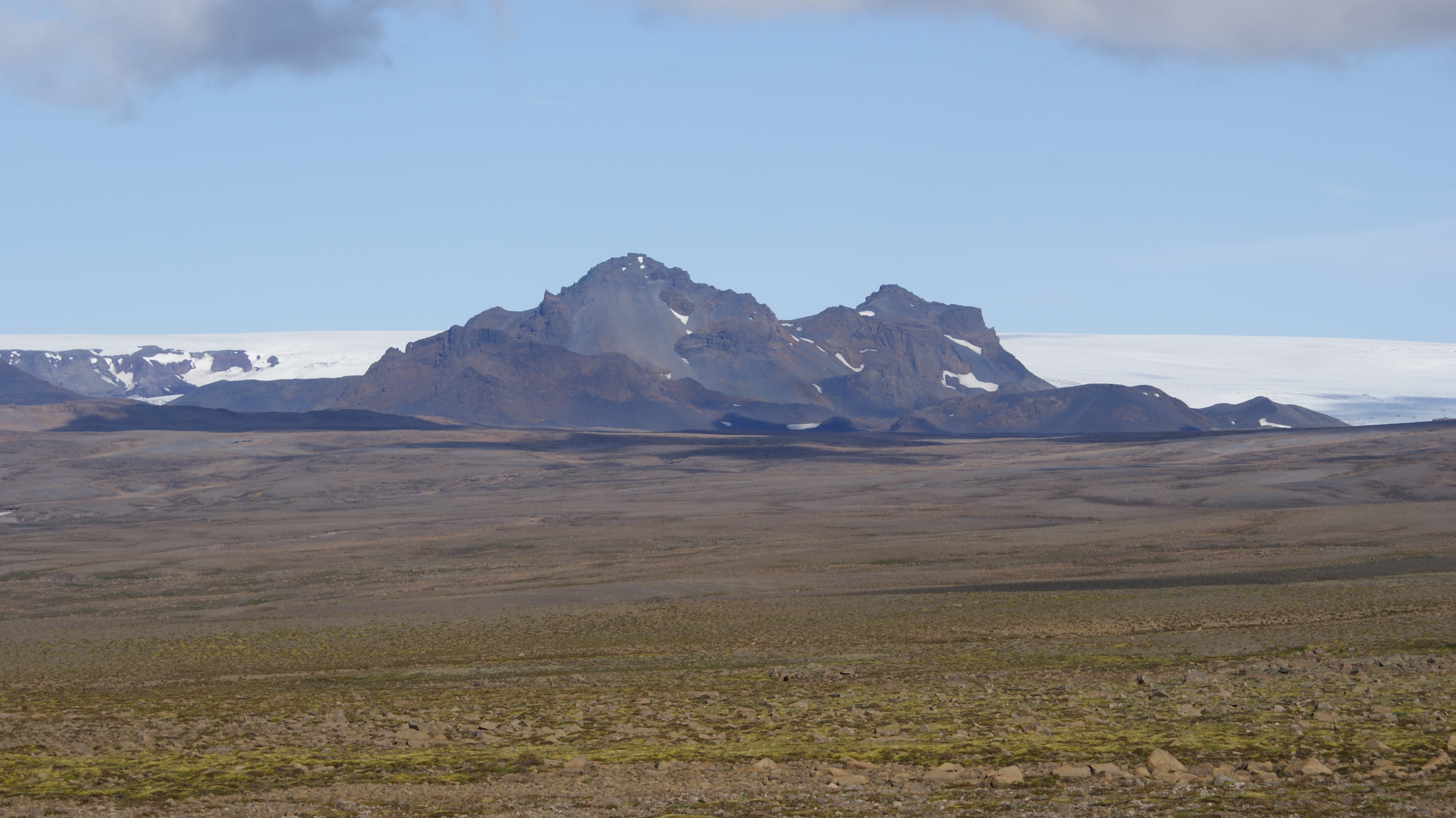
View from Kjölur towards Hofsjökull and Arnarfell hiðmikla

Like Sprengisandur highland road, the area was probably known since the first times of Icelandic settlement and is mentioned in the Icelandic sagas. A track along Langjökull was used as a shortcut between regions during summer. This is today known as Kjalvegur hinn forni (Old Kjalvegur) and is still in use for trekking and horse-riding. Piles of stones mark the track through the highland desert. After some people had perished in a snowstorm by the end of the 18th century, the Kjölur road was forgotten for about 100 years. It was rediscovered in the 19th century.

In the 18th century, the Icelandic outlaw Fjalla-Eyvindur used the Hveravellir hot springs as a settlement. One of the hot spots in this area is still used for bathing.

== Transport ==
A gravel road known as Kjalvegur (F35) runs through the centre of the area, connecting the Southern Region and Northwestern Region of the country. A few smaller tracks lead from the main track, making Hveravellir and Kerlingarfjöll accessible by car. Other tracks however, may be used only on foot.

== See also ==
- Route 35
