= Hveravellir =

Volcano in Iceland

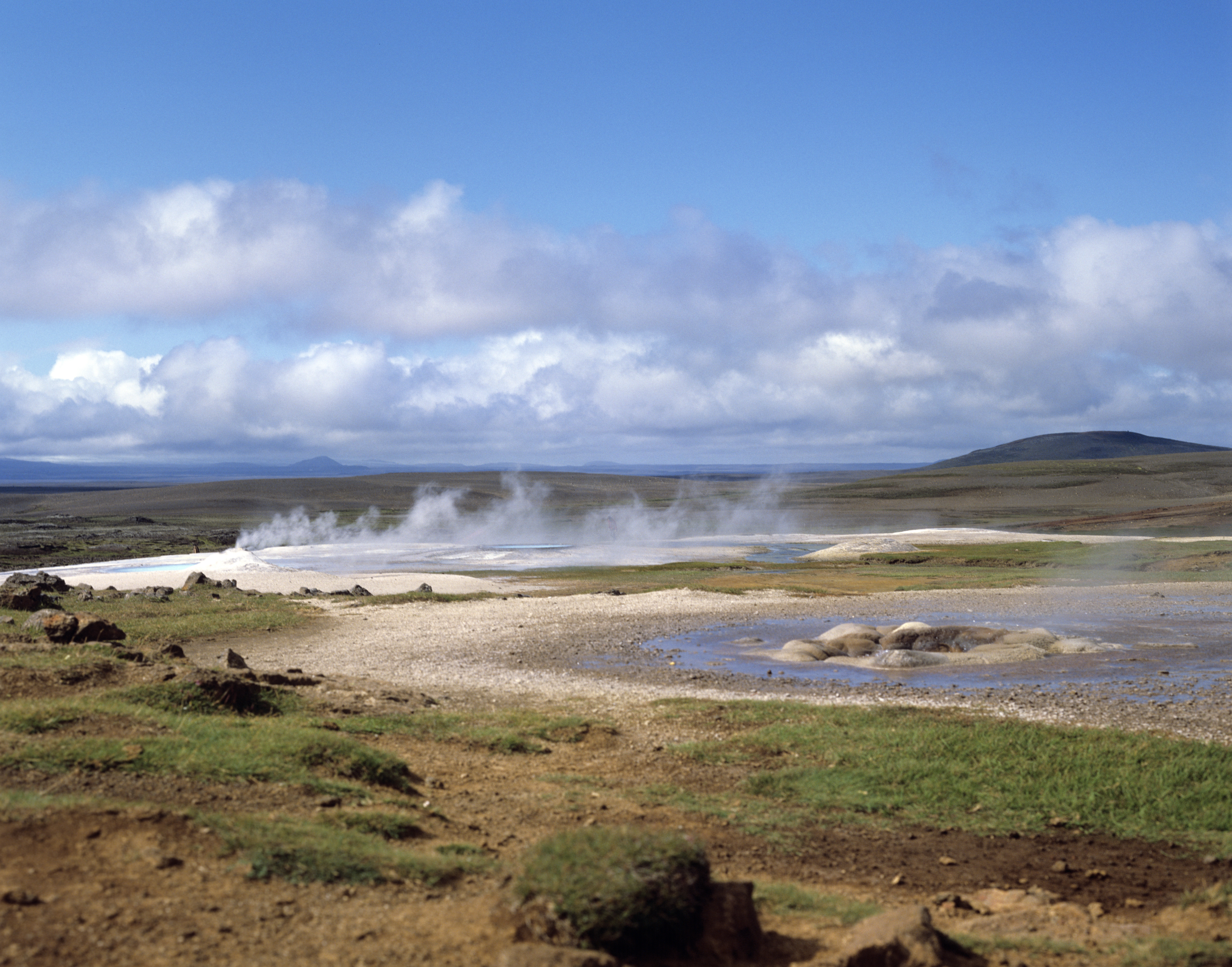

Highest point
- Elevation: 650 m (2,130 ft)
- Coordinates: 64°51′55.1″N 19°33′24.0″W

Geography
- Location within Iceland
- Location: Húnavatnshreppur, Iceland

Geology
- Mountain type: Subglacial volcano

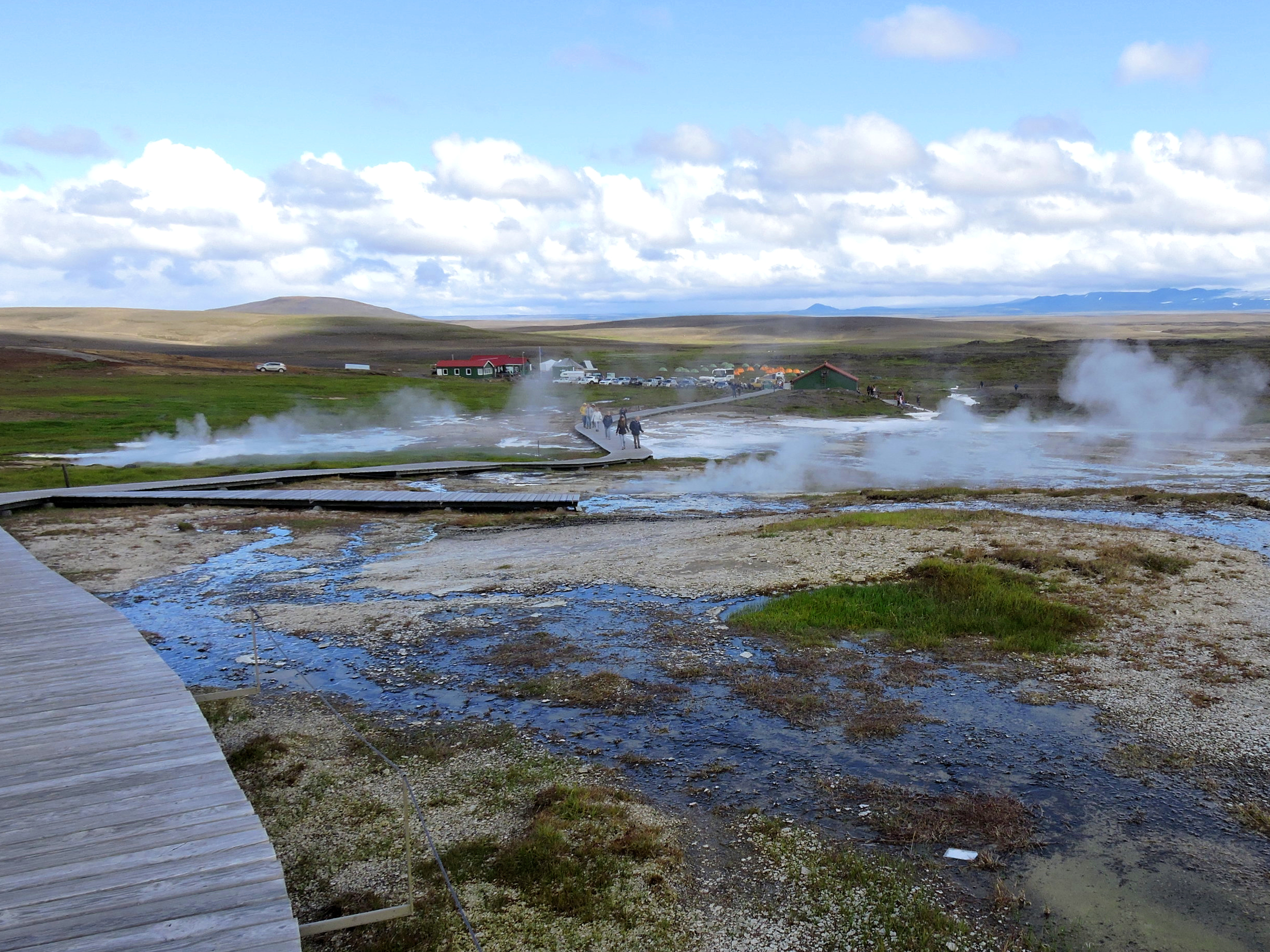
Hveravellir geothermal field, in the Kjölur plateau

Hveravellir (Icelandic pronunciation: [ˈkʰvɛːraˌvɛtlɪr̥]) is a geothermal field (high temperature field) of the Oddnýjarhnjúkur-Langjökull volcanic system [ˈɔtːˌniːjarˌn̥juːkʏr̥]-[ˈlauŋkˌjœːkʏtl̥] in the north of the Langjökull glacier.

== Description ==
Hveravellir geothermal area is a small nature reserve and a tourist centre located at 600 m (2,000 ft) at the Kjölur mountain route between the glaciers Hofsjökull and Langjökull, in central Iceland. It is part of the Oddnýjarhnjúkur-Langjökull volcanic system. The place has been a popular resting place in highland travels since the age of settlement, 1100-1200 years ago. It is frequently mentioned in the old sagas, annals and folklore. Refuge huts have been situated there from the early beginning. The main geothermal activity is at the northern border of the large lava shield Kjalhraun [ˈcʰalˌr̥œyːn]. The main geothermal area covers around 2.5 km^{2} (0.97 sq mi). The hot springs are of various types, geysers, fumaroles, solfataras, boiling pits and warm springs with lower temperatures. The currently active geysers only have small irregular eruptions. Sinter and geyserite is prominent, forming low and wide domes around active or extinct geothermal centres. In Breiðimelur [ˈpreiːðɪˌmɛːlʏr̥], north of the main thermal area, there are several steam vents where people have baked black rye bread in the hot ground. A continuation of the thermal area can be traced several kilometers towards the north were several hot springs are found.

The oldest description of Hveravellir dates back to 1752 when Icelandic travelers Eggert Ólafsson (1726–1768) and Bjarni Pálsson (1719–1779) described the field in their travel report on the island. The geothermal field is a tourist attraction; a bath can be taken in the pool created by damming the hot water stream in 1950. Hveravellir is a declared natural monument.

== Climate ==
Climate data for Hveravellir, Iceland (1965-2004)
| Month | Jan | Feb | Mar | Apr | May | Jun | Jul | Aug | Sep | Oct | Nov | Dec | Year |
|---|---|---|---|---|---|---|---|---|---|---|---|---|---|
| Record high °C (°F) | 8.6 (47.5) | 7.8 (46.0) | 7.7 (45.9) | 10.0 (50.0) | 15.7 (60.3) | 21.6 (70.9) | 22.7 (72.9) | 22.4 (72.3) | 16.8 (62.2) | 12.0 (53.6) | 8.6 (47.5) | 9.1 (48.4) | 22.7 (72.9) |
| Mean daily maximum °C (°F) | −3.3 (26.1) | −3.1 (26.4) | −2.7 (27.1) | −0.1 (31.8) | 4.1 (39.4) | 9.1 (48.4) | 11.5 (52.7) | 10.6 (51.1) | 6.3 (43.3) | 1.5 (34.7) | −1.7 (28.9) | −2.8 (27.0) | 2.4 (36.4) |
| Daily mean °C (°F) | −6.4 (20.5) | −6.2 (20.8) | −5.9 (21.4) | −3.2 (26.2) | 0.9 (33.6) | 5.1 (41.2) | 7.3 (45.1) | 6.6 (43.9) | 2.9 (37.2) | −1.1 (30.0) | −4.4 (24.1) | −5.9 (21.4) | −0.9 (30.5) |
| Mean daily minimum °C (°F) | −10.0 (14.0) | −9.7 (14.5) | −9.2 (15.4) | −6.1 (21.0) | −1.8 (28.8) | 1.9 (35.4) | 4.2 (39.6) | 3.7 (38.7) | 0.5 (32.9) | −3.6 (25.5) | −7.5 (18.5) | −9.4 (15.1) | −3.9 (25.0) |
| Record low °C (°F) | −30.4 (−22.7) | −27.2 (−17.0) | −26.3 (−15.3) | −27.9 (−18.2) | −17.1 (1.2) | −6.9 (19.6) | −2.0 (28.4) | −6.3 (20.7) | −12.1 (10.2) | −19.2 (−2.6) | −22.1 (−7.8) | −28.5 (−19.3) | −30.4 (−22.7) |
| Average precipitation mm (inches) | 63.3 (2.49) | 75.8 (2.98) | 65.4 (2.57) | 45.7 (1.80) | 38.2 (1.50) | 56.0 (2.20) | 53.4 (2.10) | 73.0 (2.87) | 62.6 (2.46) | 79.3 (3.12) | 55.6 (2.19) | 67.9 (2.67) | 736.2 (28.95) |
| Average relative humidity (%) | 85.2 | 85.4 | 85.5 | 84.8 | 83.4 | 80.5 | 81.7 | 83.7 | 85.2 | 87.7 | 86.5 | 85.3 | 84.6 |
| Mean monthly sunshine hours | 14.8 | 44.4 | 92.6 | 146.8 | 194.4 | 178.1 | 154.4 | 139.2 | 101.5 | 61.3 | 21.2 | 4.5 | 1,153.2 |
| Percentage possible sunshine | 10 | 20 | 26 | 33 | 34 | 29 | 26 | 28 | 27 | 22 | 13 | 4 | 26 |
Source: IMO

== See also ==
- Volcanism of Iceland
  - List of volcanic eruptions in Iceland
  - List of volcanoes in Iceland
