= Blanda =

River in Iceland

Coordinates: 65°39′40″N 20°18′00″W

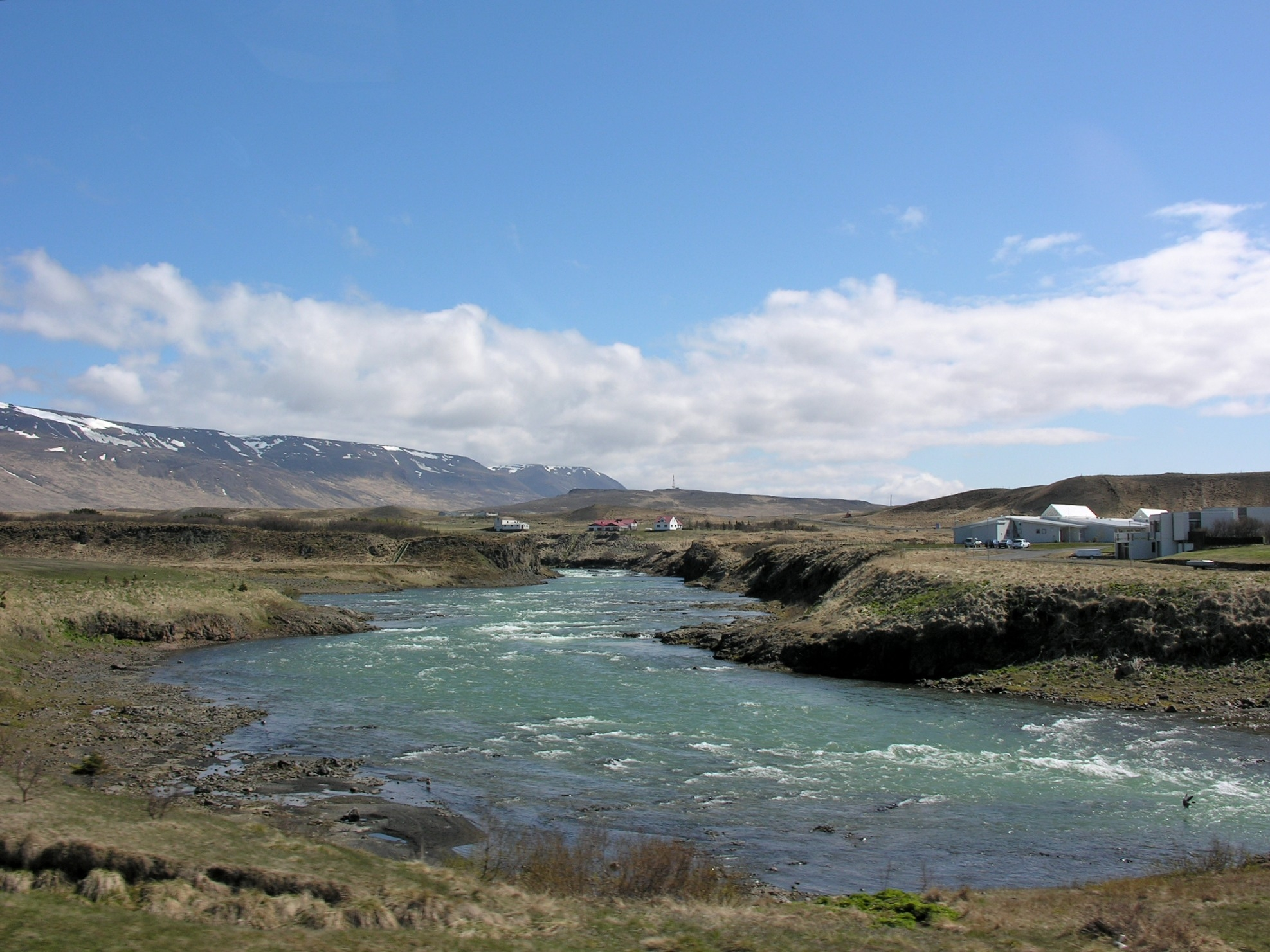

Location
- Countries: Iceland

Physical characteristics
- Length: 125 kilometres (78 mi)

The Blanda (Icelandic pronunciation: [ˈplanta]) is a river in Iceland which flows northwards from the northwest side of the Hofsjökull glacier into Húnaflói bay at Blönduós. The Blanda is one of the longest rivers in the country, with a length of about 125 km, and has a catchment area estimated at 2370 km^{2}. Its source is calculated to lie at a height of 800m. The river is one of the main salmon rivers in Iceland and has often yielded a catch of almost 3000 salmon in one summer. Before the river was dammed in 1990, the salmon spawning grounds reached almost to the foot of the glacier. Blanda hydroelectric power station uses the drop of the river to generate up to 150MW of power.

== Gallery ==
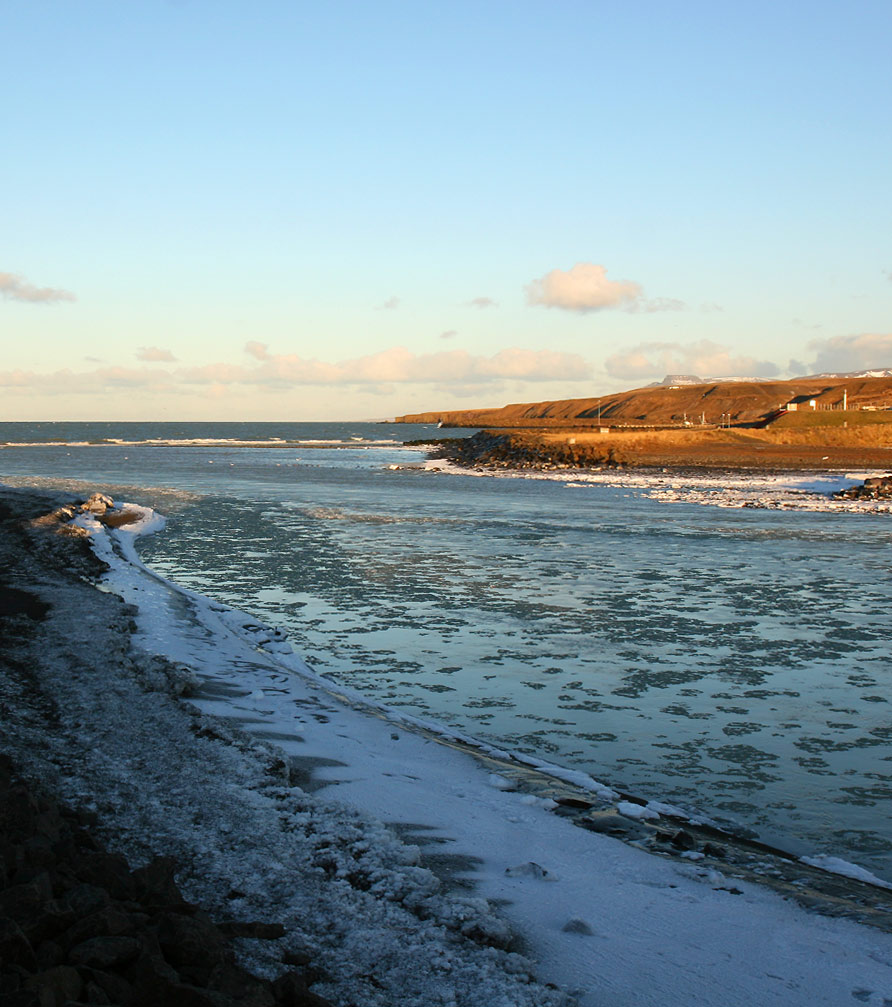
Mouth of Blanda river emptying into Húnaflói, November 2007

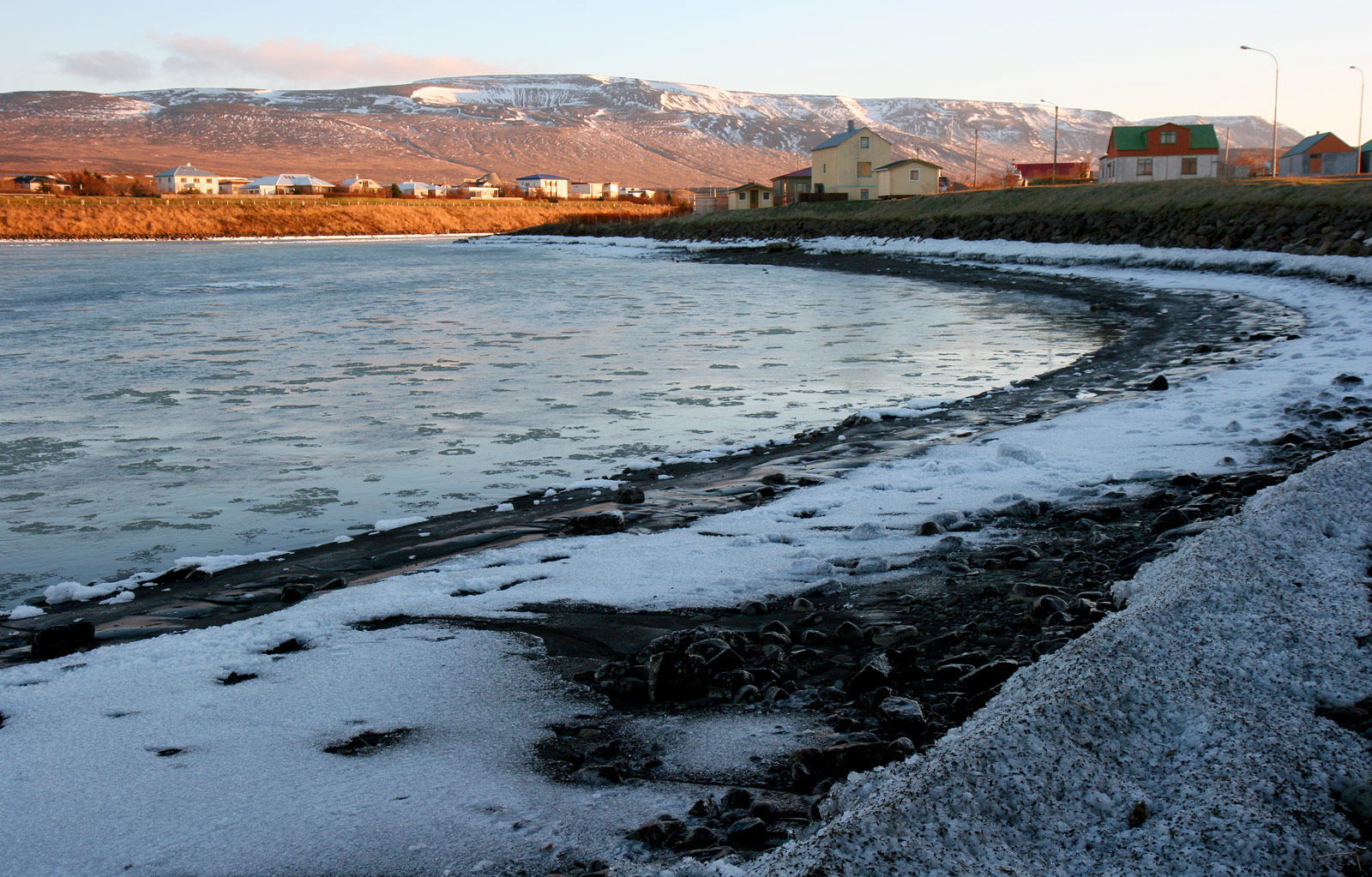
Blanda river flowing through Blönduós

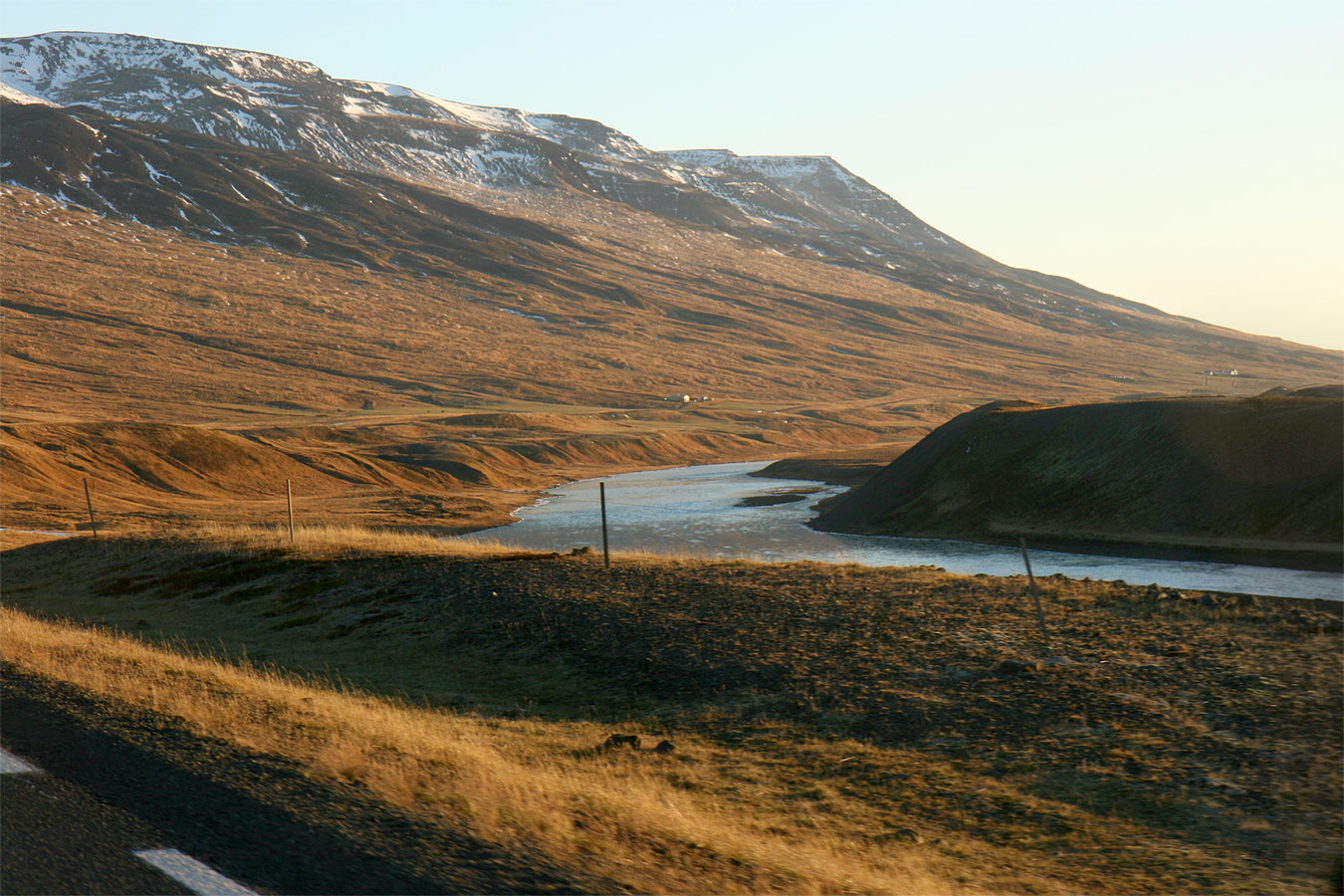
Blanda river, flowing beneath Langadalsfjall
