= Loðmundur =

Mountain in Iceland

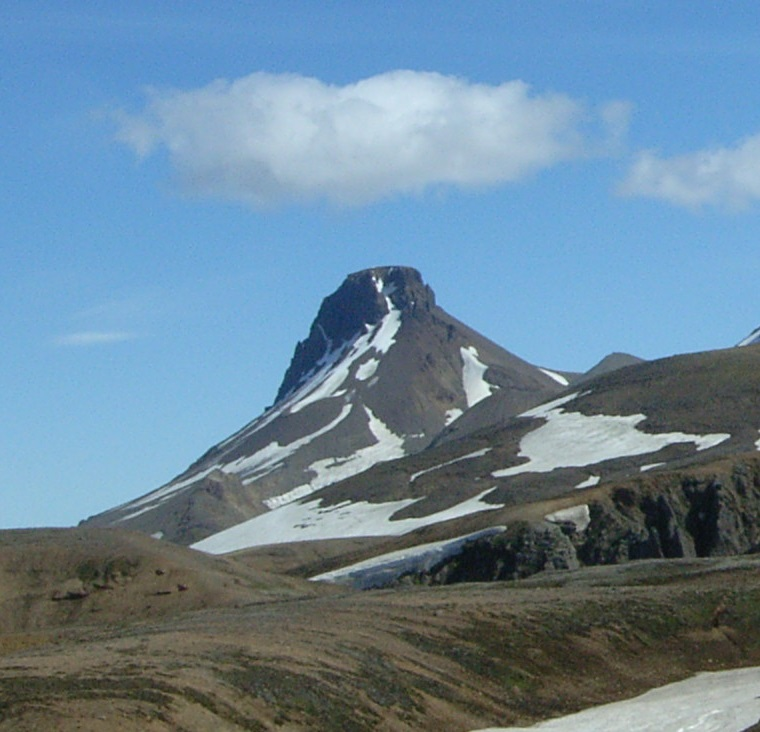

Highest point
- Elevation: 1,432 m (4,698 ft)
- Coordinates: 64°39′01″N 19°12′32″W

Geography
- Location within Iceland
- Parent range: Kerlingarfjöll

Loðmundur (Icelandic pronunciation: [ˈlɔðˌmʏntʏr̥]) is a 1,432 m (4,700 ft) high mountain in the Kerlingarfjöll mountain range in Iceland. It stands by itself on the northeast edge of the range. The hills are very steep and the top section is surrounded by near-vertical cliffs. The top itself is flat once reached.

The mountain is 175,000 years old.
