= Hofsjökull volcanic system =

Volcano in Iceland

Hofsjökull
- Hofsjökull-Kerlingarfjöll volcanic system
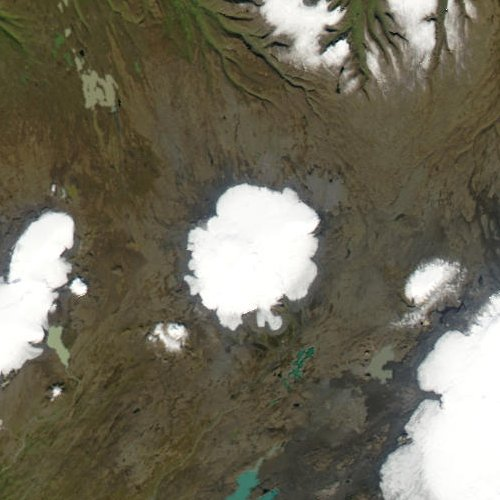
- Satellite image of Hofsjökull with the smaller snow capped Kerlingarfjöll to its south.

Highest point
- Elevation: 1,782 metres (5,846 ft)
- Prominence: ≈1100 m
- Coordinates: 64°49′59″N 18°45′58″W

Geography
- Selected geological features near the Hofsjökull volcanic system (red outlines) and its Holocene lava flows (violet shading). Legend: Other shading shows: '"`UNIQ--templatestyles-00000008-QINU`"' calderas; '"`UNIQ--templatestyles-00000009-QINU`"' central volcanoes; '"`UNIQ--templatestyles-0000000A-QINU`"' fissure swarms; '"`UNIQ--templatestyles-0000000B-QINU`"' subglacial terrain above 1,100 m (3,600 ft); '"`UNIQ--templatestyles-0000000C-QINU`"' seismically active areas; Clicking on the rectangle in the image enlarges to full window and enables mouse-over with more detail.
- Location: Southwestern Iceland

Geology
- Rock age: Holocene
- Mountain type(s): Subglacial central volcano with caldera and fissure swarm

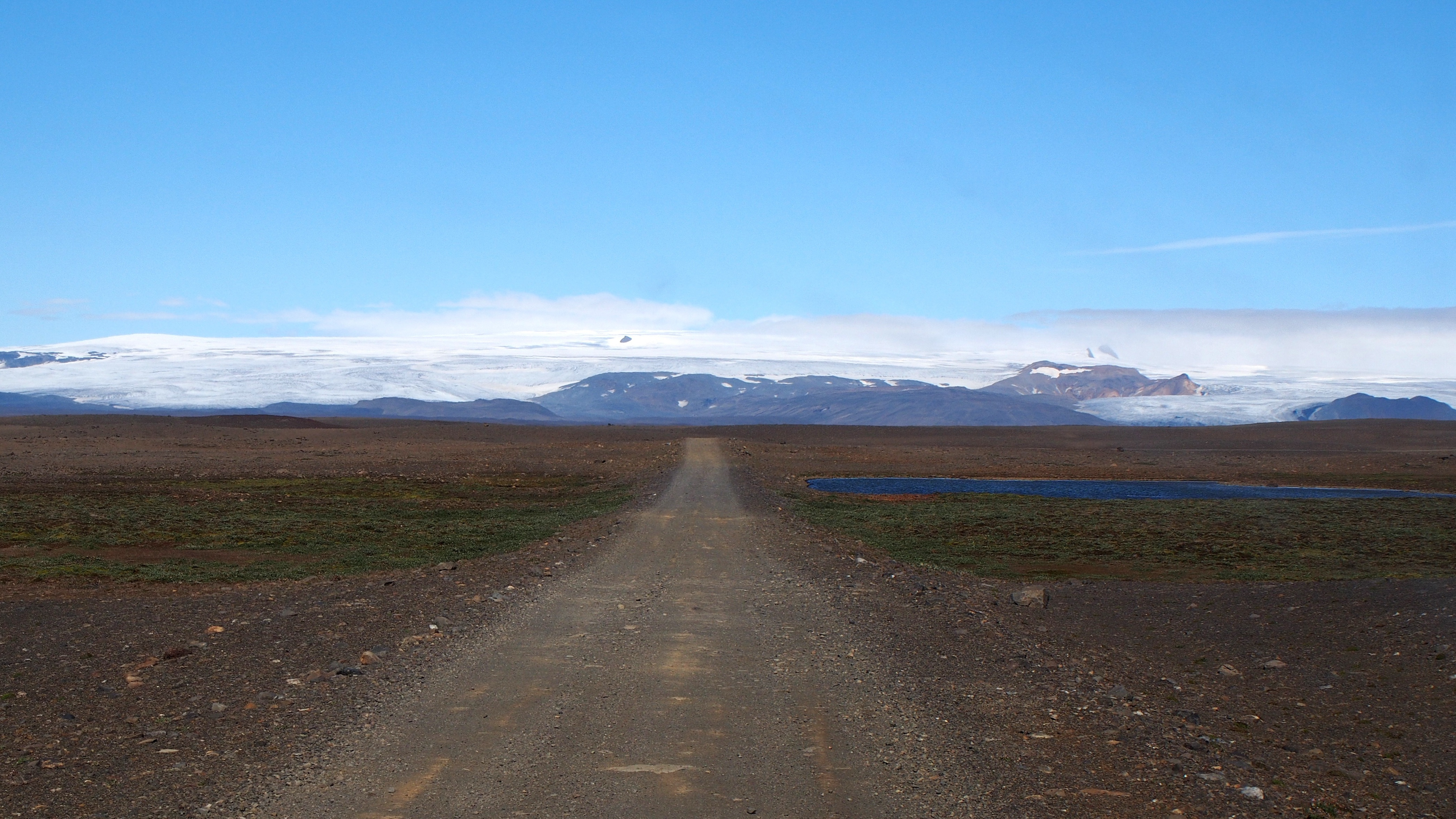
Hofsjökull icecap in the distance from the south.

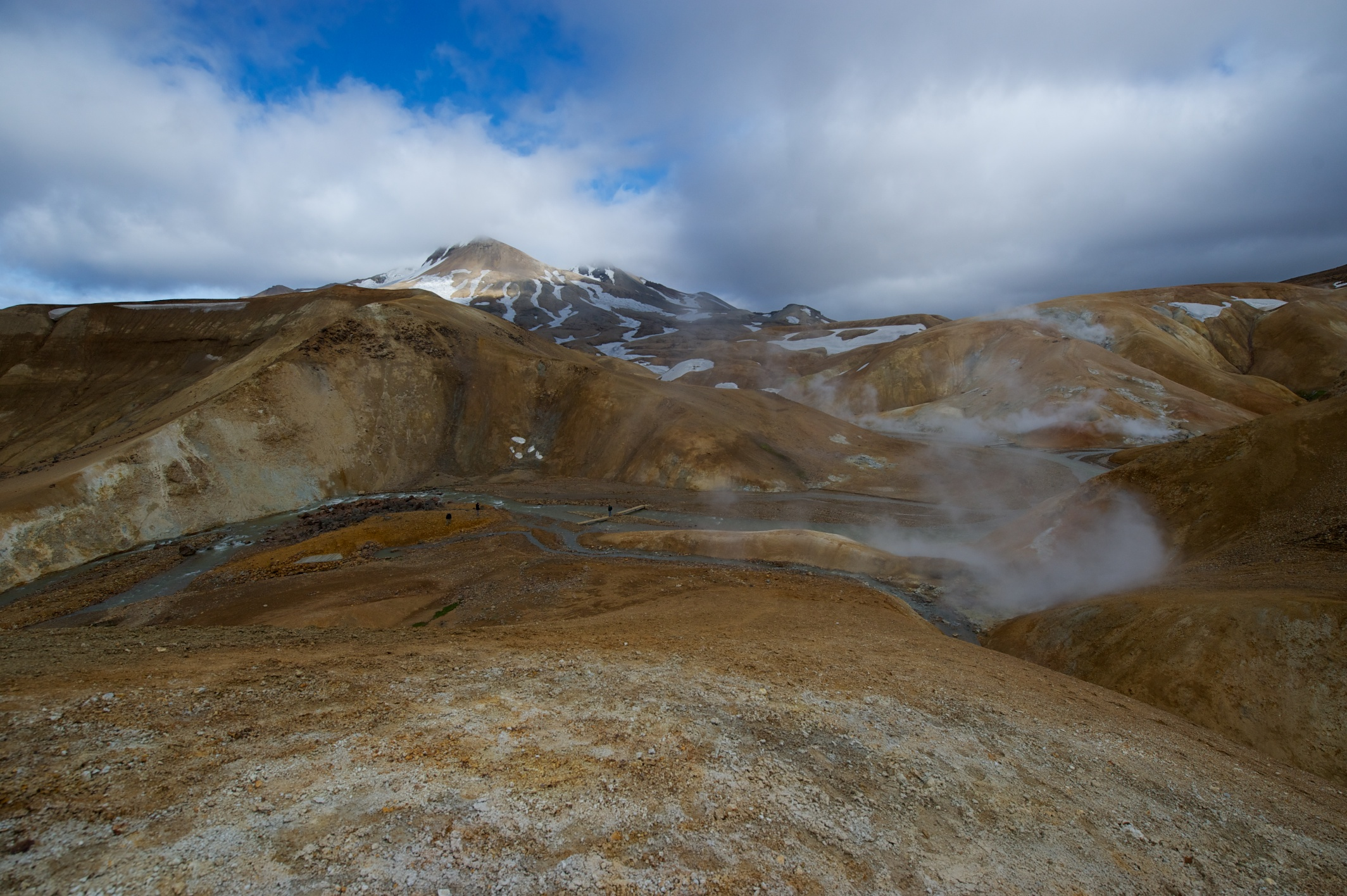
Kerlingarfjöll showing in foreground evidence of geothermal activity.

The Hofsjökull volcanic system (also Hofsjökull-Kerlingarfjöll volcanic system) contains the largest active central volcano in Iceland. It is called Hofsjökull (Icelandic: "temple glacier", Icelandic pronunciation: [ˈhɔfsˌjœːkʏtl̥]), after the icecap of the same name. The system is in the west of the Highlands of Iceland and north of the dormant central volcano of Kerlingarfjöll Icelandic pronunciation: [ˈcʰɛ(r)tliŋkarˌfjœtl̥]), which is usually regarded as part of the same volcanic system.

== Activity ==
The volcanic system has for Iceland, low activity. There are high temperature geothermal areas associated with the Hofsjökull central volcano, its northern fissure swarm, and Kerlingarfjöll to its south. A sulfurous jökulhlaup occurred in the summer of 2013, from the Hofsjökull glacier with a new ice cauldron being formed at the north-east edge of the Hofsjökull central volcano's caldera. There have been earthquake swarms in the period 1996 to 2013 on the western and northern flanks of the Hofsjökull central volcano, extending to the northern fissure swarm but only isolated earthquakes under Kerlingarfjöll to the south. The last effusive eruption was just to the north of the Hofsjökull icecap between 3000 and 4500 years ago.

== Geography ==
The two central volcanoes are mountain massifs. Hofsjökull is between 20–30 km (12–19 mi) in diameter. From Hofsjökull, fissure mapping has defined fissure swarms that trend NNW-SSE in the north and SW-NE in the south. These extend to the south-west and south by about 30 km (19 mi). Fissure swarms extend to the north by 40 km (25 mi). The Hofsjökull central volcano caldera is located under the south-west portion of the icecap and is 6–7 km (3.7–4.3 mi) wide and about 600 m (2,000 ft) deep. Nunataks exposed on the caldera rim are 1,628 m (5,341 ft) high but probable rim height is about 1,650 m (5,410 ft) from subglacial mapping that also reveals a maximum thickness of ice of 700 m (2,300 ft). There are post ice–age lava flows to the south, east and north of the Hofsjökull central volcano. Kerlingarfjöll, is eroded, and about 15–20 km (9.3–12.4 mi) in diameter.

== Geology ==
The central volcanoes have tholeiite basalt and rhyolite components. In the case of Kerlingarfjöll which is not covered by 600 m (2,000 ft) of ice, the rhyolite is found close to the two central caldera. Kerlingarfjöll, is between 68 and 350 thousand years old. In the case of Hofsjökull the basaltic hyaloclastite deposits have rhyolite outcrops at the margins of the glacier, on some of the nunataks east of the caldera, and at the Arnarfell peak at the south-east margin of the glacier. Fissure vents that have erupted basalts form tuya's to the south.

The largest tholeiite basalt lava flow that originates in the southern fissure swarm to the south of Hofsjökull is the 4500 to 7000 years old Illahraun lava, with a composition distinct from Kerlingarfjöll (to its south–west) and covers about 37 km^{2} (14 sq mi).

The fissure swarms and a radial pattern of dike intrusions appear to radiate away from the Hofsjökull central volcano suggesting that it is a significant local stress field. To the south the 6 km (3.7 mi) wide western part of the fissure swarm has multiple mainly mostly tensional faults orientated at 30° that are traceable as they extend across the Langjökull volcanic system's 10,000 years ago origin Kjalhraun lava shield. The south-western part of the southern fissure swarm is orientated at 40° and after a shadow to the south produced by the older Kerlingarfjöll the rest of the southern swarm which is about 9 km (5.6 mi) wide, is orientated at 50°. The northern fissure swam is orientated perhaps at -10° from north with a wider spread.

=== Tectonics ===
The Hofsjökull volcanic system is found on the north-eastern edge of the Hreppar microplate, so has the North American Plate to its north and the Eurasian Plate to its east. It is classified as being in the Mid-Iceland belt that connects the Western volcanic zone to the intersection of the Northern volcanic zone and the Eastern volcanic zone. The moho is over 30 km (19 mi) deep under Kerlingarfjöll and at the north-east coroner of the system is over 40 km (25 mi) deep. The pole of relative rotation of the Hreppar microplate is near the Hofsjökull volcanic system. This implies by geometry that the relative plate velocity across this region is small which geologists usually predict means little seismic or volcanic activity. However the system is also over the current north-eastern area of the Iceland hotspot.

== Glacier ==
The icecap covers an area of about 900 km^{2} (350 sq mi), with the icecap top being 1,782 metres (5,846 ft).

== See also ==
- Glaciers of Iceland
- Iceland plume
- Volcanism of Iceland
  - List of volcanic eruptions in Iceland
  - List of volcanoes in Iceland
