= Kerlingarfjöll =

Mountain range in Iceland

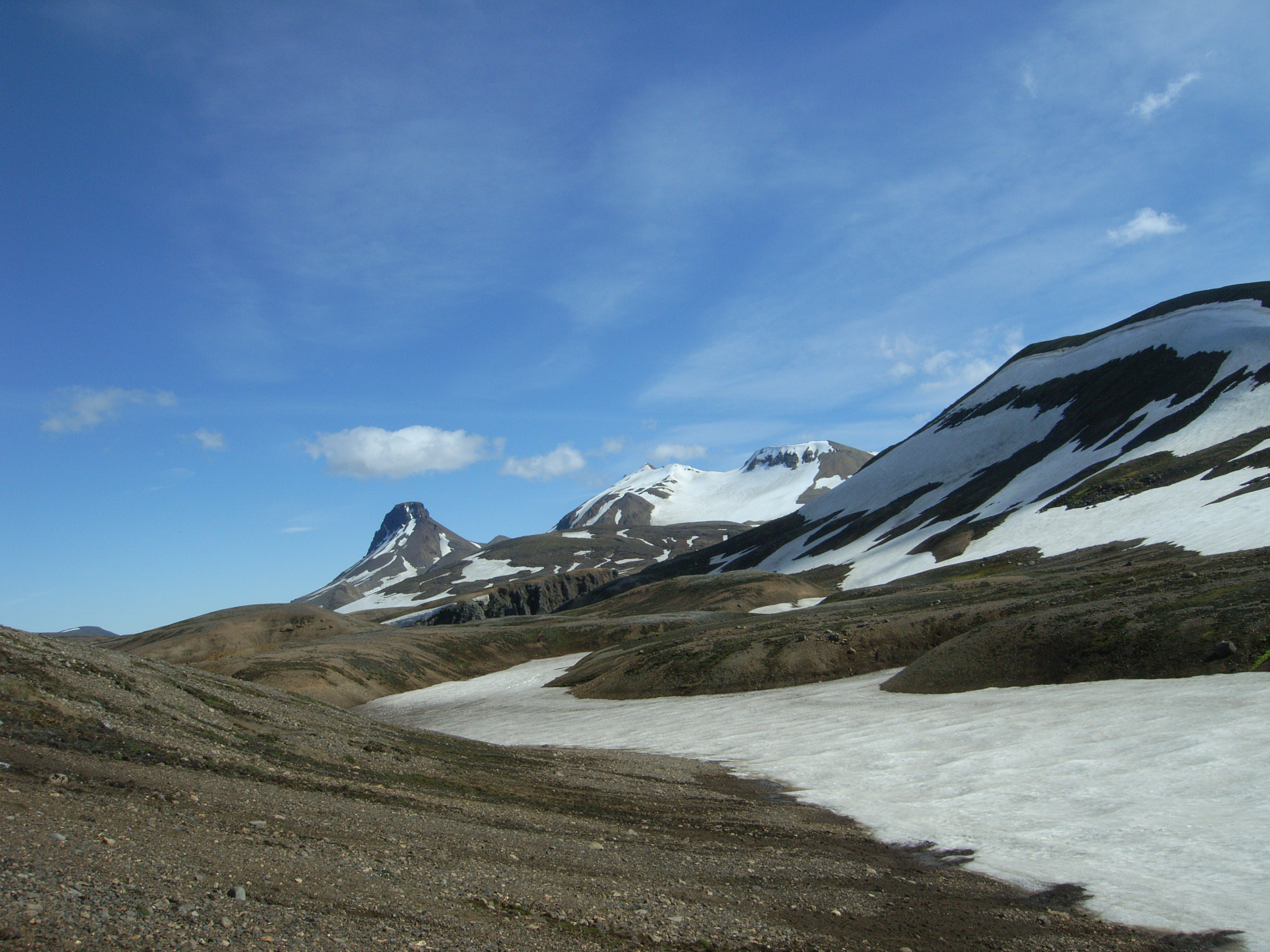
- The peaks of the Kerlingarfjöll area.

Highest point
- Elevation: 1,477 m (4,846 ft)
- Coordinates: 64°39′N 19°15′W

Geography
- Location within Iceland
- Selected geological features near Kerlingarfjöll. Legend: Kerlingarfjöll; Hofsjökull volcanic system; calderas; central volcanoes; fissure swarms; subglacial terrain above 1,100 m (3,600 ft); seismically active areas; Clicking on the rectangle symbol enlarges to full window and enables mouse-over with more detail. Location of Kerlingafjöll within Iceland
- Location: Iceland

Geology
- Mountain type: Central volcano

Kerlingarfjöll (Icelandic pronunciation: [ˈcʰɛ(r)tliŋkarˌfjœtl̥]) is a 1,477 m (4,846 ft) tall volcanic massif in Iceland situated in the Highlands of Iceland near the Kjölur highland road. It is usually regarded as part of a large tuya fissure system of 100 km^{2} (39 sq mi) in the southern portion of the Hofsjökull volcanic system, although is about 20–30 km (12–19 mi) in diameter itself, and is between 68 and 350 thousand years old predating some of the activity in the rest of the system. The volcanic origin of these mountains is evidenced by tholeiite basalt deposits, the numerous hot springs and rivulets in the area, as well as red volcanic rhyolite stone most marked near the two caldera. Minerals that have emerged from the hot springs also color the ground yellow, red and green.

The area was known formerly for its summer ski resort, but this was dismantled in 2000. Since 2000, Kerlingarfjöll has been operated as a highland resort, offering accommodation and food services to guests in the area.

On 17 March 2017, it was reported that the Kerlingarfjöll Mountains and geothermal area were being turned into a nature reserve. Although parts of the place already had protection, a whole 367 km^{2} (142 sq mi) are to be under the protection of the state of Iceland. There have been thoughts of using the 140 °C (284 °F) hot springs as a geothermal power plant. The area is popular with hiking and the tourists.

There are various half-day and one-day hiking trails in the area.

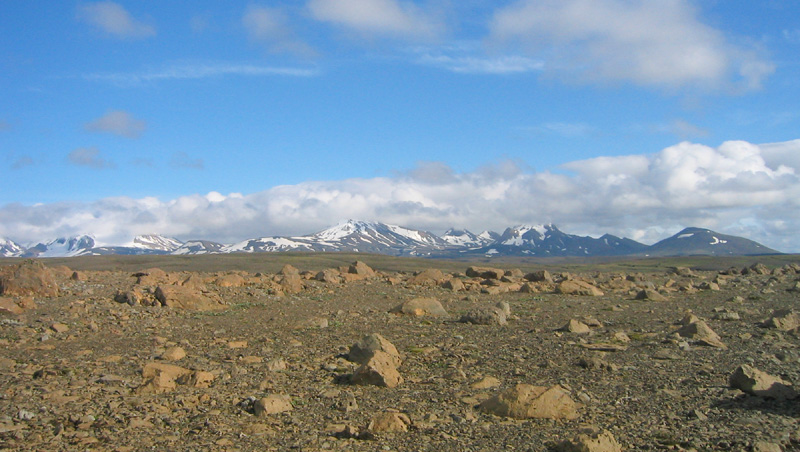
Kerlingarfjöll as seen from the Kjölur road.

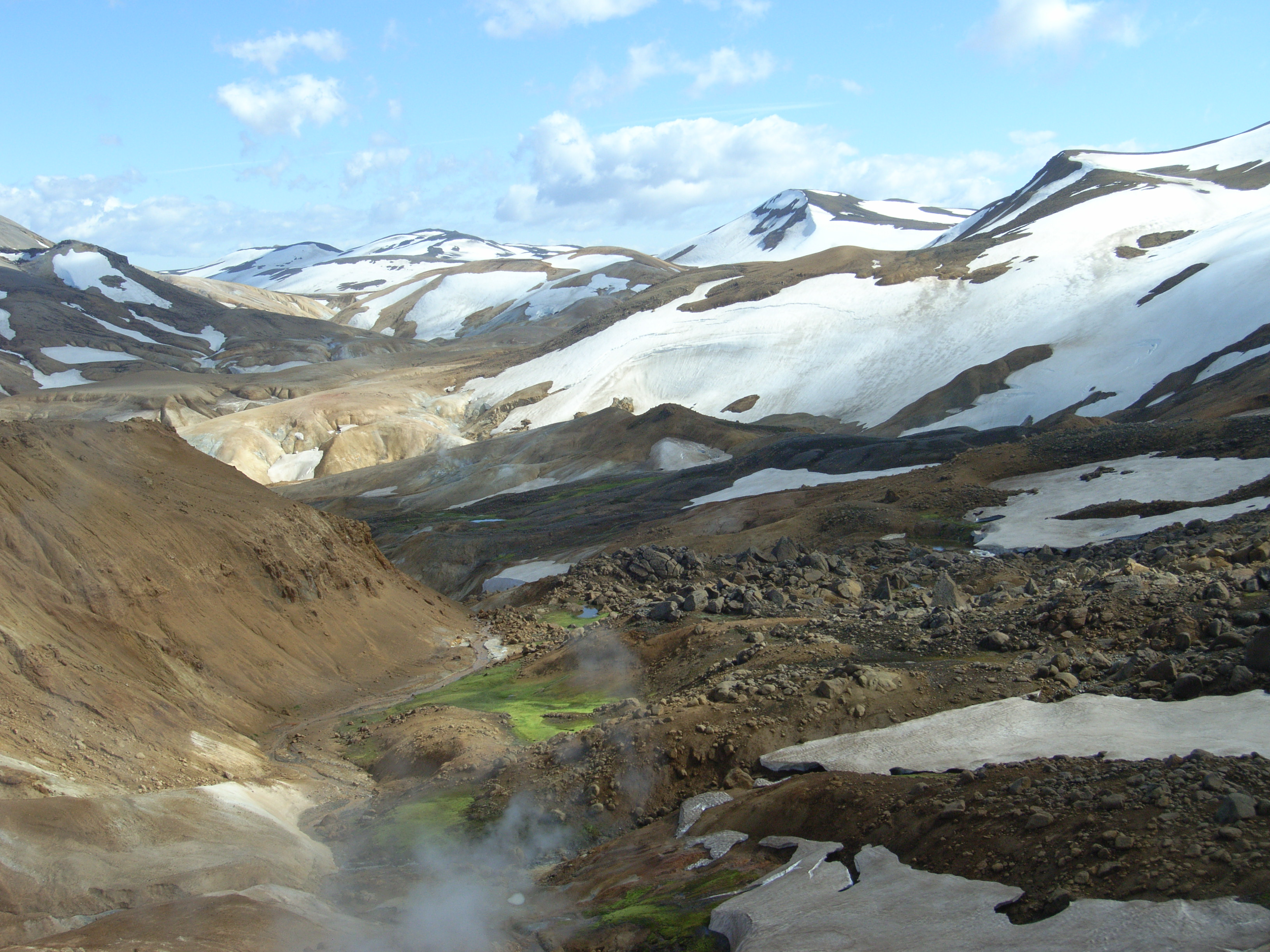
Valley in the Kerlingarfjöll area with geothermal activity.

== See also ==
- Geography of Iceland
- Iceland plume
- Loðmundur, a mountain in Kerlingafjöll
- Volcanism of Iceland
  - List of volcanic eruptions in Iceland
  - List of volcanoes in Iceland
