= Cymene Howe =

Cultural anthropologist

Cymene Howe is a cultural anthropologist and Professor in the Department of Anthropology at Rice University, Houston, Texas, United States. Her research has focused on environment, inequalities and the anthropology of climate change. She has also been active in multi-modal approaches to knowledge and public anthropology through podcasting, documentary filmmaking and installations, most notably the Okjökull memorial.

== Career ==
Howe has conducted anthropological field work in Nicaragua, Mexico, Iceland and the United States and she has been the recipient of several research grants, including from the National Science Foundation and The Fulbright Program. She has been an invited Society Scholar in the Society for the Humanities at Cornell University and a visiting fellow at Durham University, U.K. From 2015 to 2018 she served as co-editor of the journal Cultural Anthropology and was founding faculty of The Center for Energy and Environmental Research in the Human Sciences (CENHS) at Rice University (now the Center for Environmental Studies).

With Dominic Boyer, she carried out one of the first major anthropological studies on renewable energy transition. The research took place in Mexico's Isthmus of Tehuantepec, site of the world's densest concentration of terrestrial wind parks and became the subject of two books, Ecologics: Wind and Power in the Anthropocene (Howe) and Energopolitics: Wind and Power in the Anthropocene (Boyer). Since 2016, she has also co-produced over 250 episodes of the Cultures of Energy podcast with Boyer.

From 2016 to 2018, Howe led research in Iceland for “Melt: The social life of ice at the top of the world,” that centered on the cultural impact of Icelandic glacial loss. Based on that project, with Boyer in 2018, she produced and co-directed a documentary film about Okjökull (Ok glacier) the first major Icelandic glacier to be declassified as a glacier due to global warming. The educational film, Not Ok: A little movie about a small glacier at the end of the world, featured the voice of Jón Gnarr as Ok mountain.

In August 2019, Howe and Boyer organized the installation of a memorial to Okjökull, the first of Iceland's major glaciers to be destroyed by climate change. The memorial event was widely covered by the international news media.

== Publications ==
- 21st Century Sexualities: Contemporary Issues in Health, Education and Rights (Routledge 2007; coedited with Gilbert Herdt)
- Intimate Activism: The Struggle for Sexual Rights in Postrevolutionary Nicaragua (Duke University Press, 2013)
- Ecologics: Wind and Power in the Anthropocene (Duke University Press, 2019)
- The Anthropocene Unseen: A Lexicon (Punctum Books, 2020; coedited with Anand Pandian)
