= Cultural Anthropology (journal) =

- Discipline: Anthropology
- Language: English
- Edited by: Dominic Boyer, James Faubion, Cymene Howe

Publication details
- History: 1986–present
- Publisher: The American Anthropological Association on behalf of the Society for Cultural Anthropology
- Frequency: Quarterly
- Open access: Yes
- Impact factor: 1.606 (2013)

Standard abbreviations
- ISO 4: Cult. Anthropol.

Indexing
- ISSN: 0886-7356 (print); 1548-1360 (web)
- LCCN: 86643162
- OCLC no.: 51205058

Links
- Journal homepage; Online archive

Cultural Anthropology is a quarterly peer-reviewed academic journal published by the American Anthropological Association on behalf of the Society for Cultural Anthropology. It was established in 1986 and covers emerging areas of anthropology. In 2014, it became open access. Since 2022, it has been edited by a collective, composed of Matilde Córdoba Azcárate, Alberto Corsín Jiménez, Julia Elyachar, Joanne Nucho, AbdouMaliq Simone, Manuel Tironi, and Ather Zia.

== Abstracting and indexing ==
The journal is abstracted and indexed in Current Contents/Social & Behavioral Sciences, Scopus, and the Social Sciences Citation Index. According to the Journal Citation Reports, the journal has a 2013 impact factor of 1.606.
