= Lónsöræfi =

Wilderness area in Iceland

Coordinates: 64°35′40″N 15°11′44″W

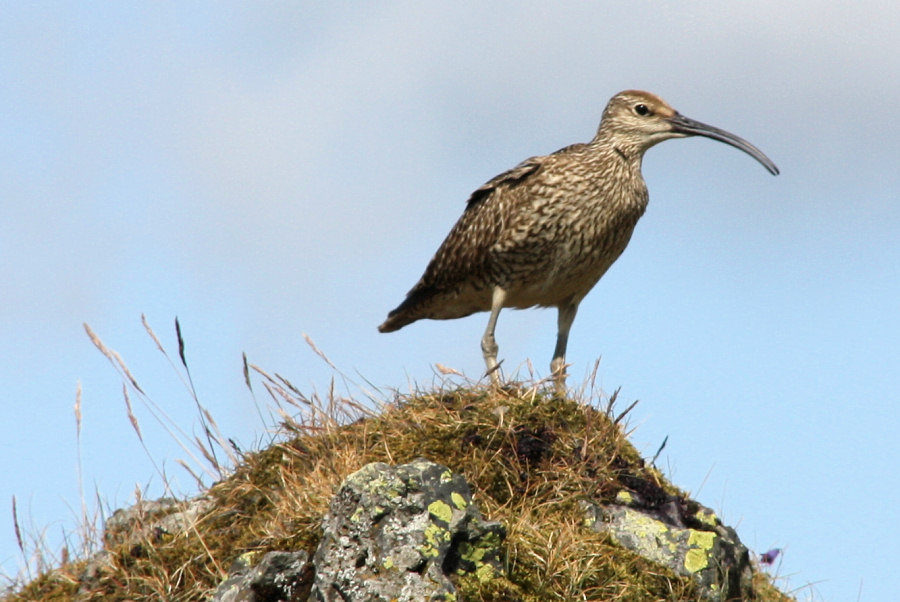
Eurasian whimbrel, popular bird in Lónsöræfi

Lónsöræfi (Icelandic pronunciation: [ˈlounsˌœːrˌaiːvɪ]) is a wilderness area in south-east Iceland. The region is characterised by its varied geological formations. These mostly date from a period between 5 and 7 million years ago, when the volcano Kollumúlaeldstöðvar [ˈkʰɔtlʏˌmuːlaˌɛltˌstœðvar̥] was active. The glacier tongues of the eastern extreme of Vatnajökull also impose themselves on the area. Visible to the north-west is Snæfell [ˈstnaiːˌfɛtl̥] (1833m), the highest peak in Iceland that isn't part of a glacier. The mountains within the area itself include Sauðhamarstindur [ˈsœyðˌhaːmar̥sˌtʰɪntʏr̥] (1319m) and Jökulgilstindar [ˈjœːkʏlˌkɪlsˌtʰɪntar̥] (1313 m).

Lónsöræfi, while less known and less accessible than areas such as Skaftafell and the Southern Highlands, is nevertheless popular with hikers. A transport service from Stafafell [ˈstaːvaˌfɛtl̥] farm into the reserve via all-terrain bus is available. Alternatively, the recent construction of a bridge for walkers over the river Jökulsá í Lóni [ˈjœːkʏlsˌauː i ˈlouːnɪ] at Eskifell [ˈɛscɪˌfɛtl̥] has improved access for hikers. There are mountain huts at Geldingafell [ˈcɛltiŋkaˌfɛtl̥], Múlaskáli [ˈmuːlaˌskauːlɪ] and Egilssel [ˈeijɪlsˌsɛːl̥] run by regional associations of Ferðafélag Íslands. A 4-6 day walking route from Snæfell to Stafafell is possible via the Eyjabakkajökull [ˈeiːjaˌpahkaˌjœːkʏtl̥] glacier tongue. The area can also be reached from Geithellnadalur [ˈceitˌhɛtlnaˌtaːlʏr̥]. The nearest settlements of any size are Höfn and Djúpivogur.

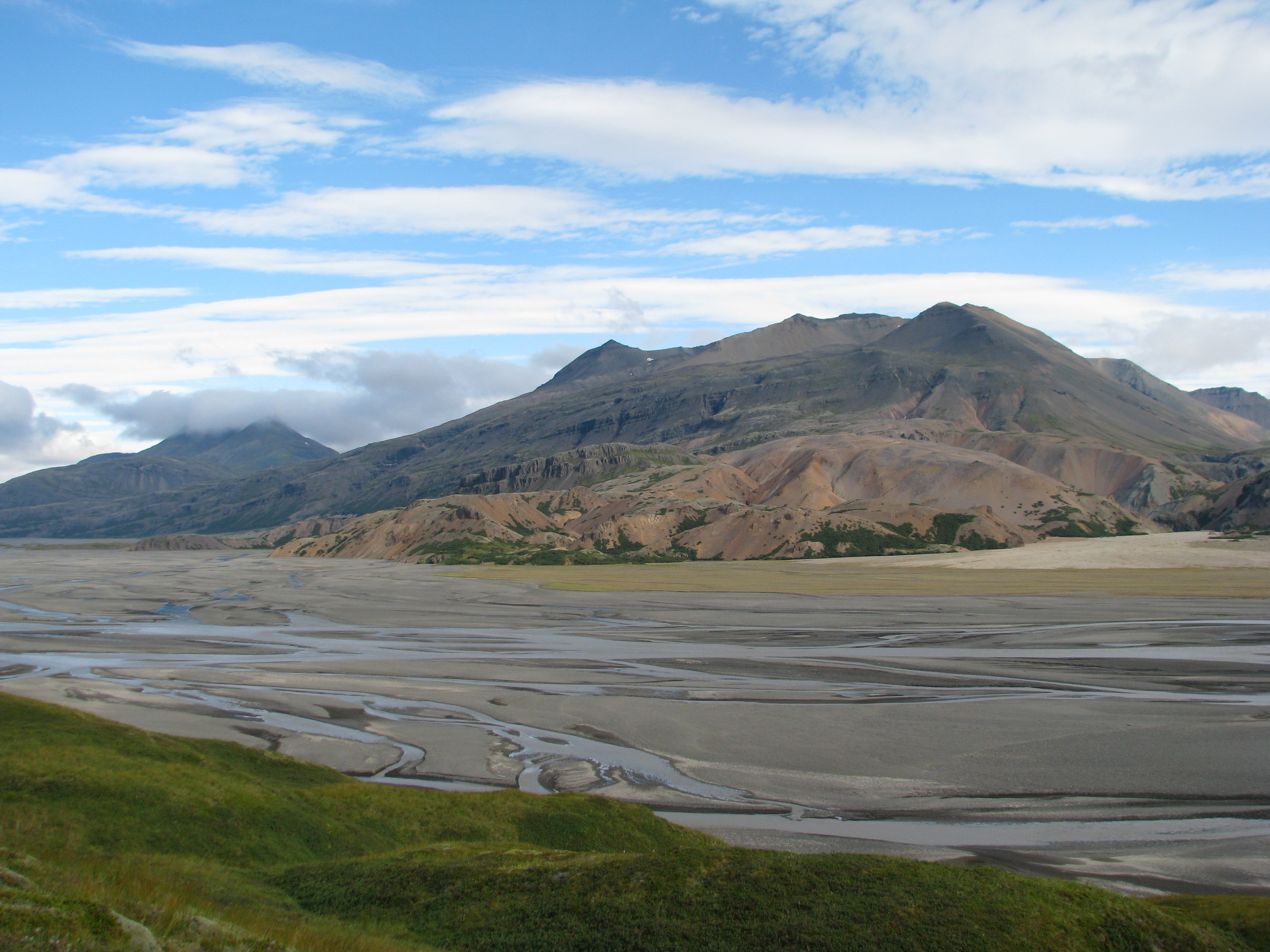
Lón [ˈlouːn].
