= Dominic Boyer =

American anthropologist, writer and filmmaker

Dominic Boyer is an American-born cultural anthropologist, writer, filmmaker and podcaster whose work focuses on relationships between energy and environment, media and politics. He is the son of historian John W. Boyer.

He is Professor of Anthropology at Rice University, where he served from 2013 to 2019 as the Founding Director of its Center for Energy and Environmental Research in the Human Sciences (CENHS).

== Teaching and research ==
Boyer served as co-editor of the journal Cultural Anthropology from 2015 and 2018 and was recognized for his commitment and leadership in Open Access (OA) scholarship, including participating on the Executive Committee of the Libraria collective. Together with his partner, Cymene Howe, Boyer produced and co-hosted over 250 episodes of the environmental humanities podcast series, "Cultures of Energy." Also with Howe, he produced and co-directed a documentary about Okjökull the first Icelandic glacier to fall victim to climate change, Not Ok: A little movie about a small glacier at the end of the world. In August 2019, Boyer and Howe organized the installation of a memorial to Okjökull, an event that was widely covered by the international news media.

in 2019, Boyer was awarded the Berlin Prize by the American Academy in Berlin.

== Bibliography ==
- 2005. Spirit and System: Media, Intellectuals, and the Dialectic in Modern German Culture (University of Chicago Press)
- 2007. Understanding Media: A popular philosophy (Prickly Paradigm Press)
- 2013. The Life Informatic: Newsmaking in the Digital Era (Cornell University Press)
- 2015. Theory Can Be More than it Used to Be: Learning Anthropology’s Method in a Time of Transition (Cornell University Press, edited with James Faubion and George E. Marcus)
- 2017. Energy Humanities: An Anthology, edited with Imre Szeman (Johns Hopkins University Press)
- 2019. Energopolitics: Wind and Power in the Anthropocene (Duke University Press)
- 2021. Hyposubjects: On Becoming Human (Open Humanities Press, with Timothy Morton)
