= Hofsjökull =

Ice cap and volcano in Iceland

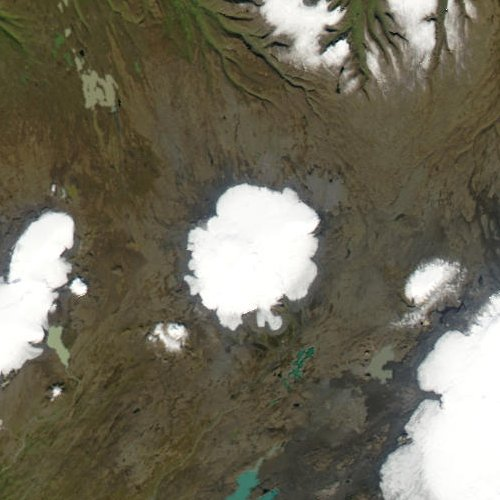
- Satellite image of Hofsjökull.
- Map of Hofsjökull glacier showing its named glacial catchments (light grey shading). Clicking on the map to enlarge it enables mouse over that allows identification of individual named glacial catchments in Iceland.
- Type: Ice cap
- Location: Southwestern Iceland
- Coordinates: 64°49′N 18°49′W
- Area: 830 km^{2} (320 sq mi)
- Thickness: up to 1,100 m (3,600 ft)
- Highest elevation: 1,782 metres (5,846 ft)
- Lowest elevation: 600 metres (2,000 ft)
- Terminus: From due north clockwise Austari-Jökulsárjökull, Illviðrajökull, Löngukvíslarjökull, Miklafellsjökull, Háöldujökull, Þjórsárjökull, Rótarjökull, Múlajökull, Nauthagajökull, Miklukvíslarjökull, Blautkvíslarjökull, Þverfellsjökull, Brattöldujökull, Blágnípujökull, Blöndujökull, Kvíslajökull, Álftabrekkujökull, Sátujökull, Lambahraunsjökull, and Tvífellsjökull outlet glaciers
- Status: Retreating

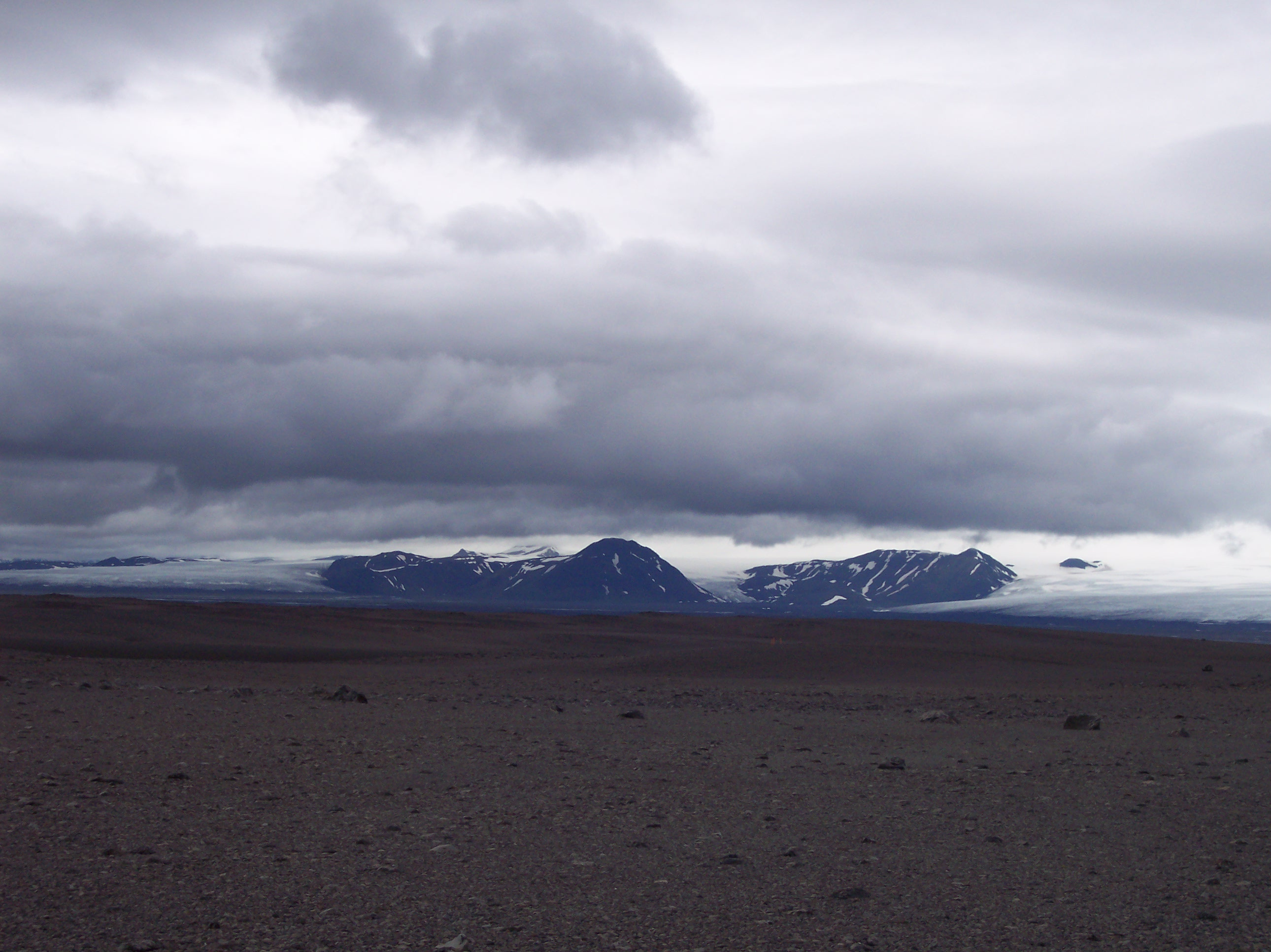
The picture shows Arnarfell hiðmikla (Great Eagle Mountain) in the middle, Múlajökull glacier to the left and Þjórsárjökull glacier to the right.

Hofsjökull (Icelandic: "temple glacier", Icelandic pronunciation: [ˈhɔfsˌjœːkʏtl̥]) is the third largest ice cap in Iceland after Vatnajökull and Langjökull and covers the largest active central volcano in the country, which has the same name. It is situated in the west of the Highlands of Iceland and north of the mountain range Kerlingarfjöll, between the two largest glaciers of Iceland.

== Glacier ==
It covers an area of 830 km^{2} (320 sq mi), with the icecap top being 1,782 metres (5,846 ft), and bottom being at about 600 m (2,000 ft). There are other summits relating to the underlying volcano with two being at 1,765 m (5,791 ft). Hofsjökull is the source of several rivers including the Þjórsá, Iceland's longest river.

=== Changes ===
While all ice caps in Iceland have been losing volume since 1995, due to high precipitation in 2015 and low ablation during the previous cool summer, the Hofsjökull ice cap increased in mass, the first time in 20 years this had happened. Between 1989 and 2015, even allowing for that last years increase, the icecap had lost about 12% of its 1989 volume which is close to 25 km^{3} (6.0 cu mi) of ice. Hofsjökull has been modelled to lose all its ice in about 200 years from studies using data between 1980 and 2005. Run off into the draining rivers is modelled to increase by about 50% by 2100 before decreasing due to diminishing area of the ice caps.

== Volcano ==
The subglacial volcano is a central volcano with a caldera. Beyond the central volcano are fissure systems which include to the south the Kerlingarfjöll central volcano.

== See also ==
- Glaciers of Iceland
- Iceland plume
- Volcanism of Iceland
  - List of volcanic eruptions in Iceland
  - List of volcanoes in Iceland
