= Central volcano =

Type of volcano

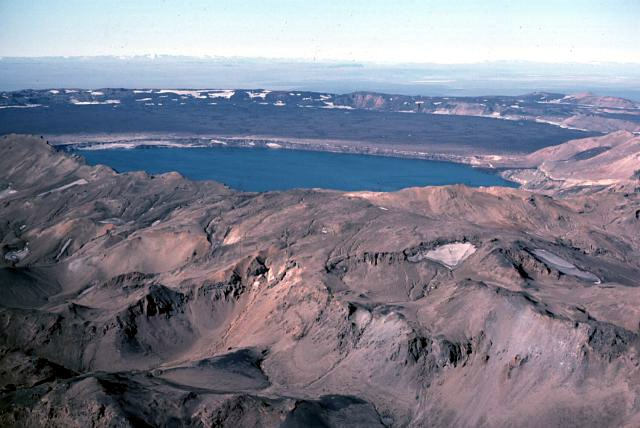
Askja central volcano in Iceland

A central volcano is a type of volcano formed by basalts and silica-rich volcanic rocks. They contain very few or no volcanic rocks of intermediate composition, such that they are chemically bimodal. Large silicic eruptions at central volcanoes often result in the formation of one or more calderas. Central volcanoes can be stratovolcanoes or shield volcanoes.

Central volcanoes undergo periodic eruptions throughout their lifetime, which can span more than a million years. In Iceland, volcanic systems are normally named after an associated central volcano. The largest known glaciovolcanic central volcano on Earth is Mount Haddington, a glacier-covered shield volcano on James Ross Island in Antarctica.

== Examples ==
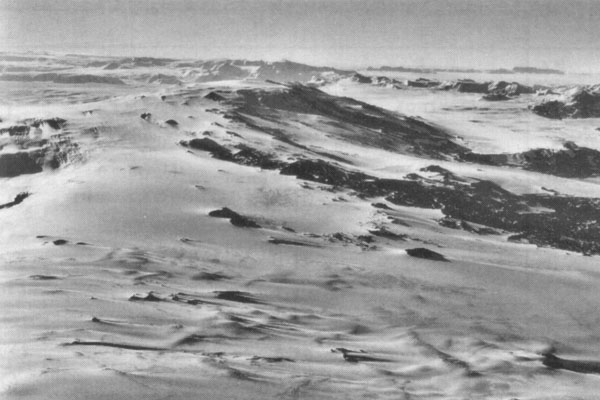
Mount Morning, a central volcano in Antarctica

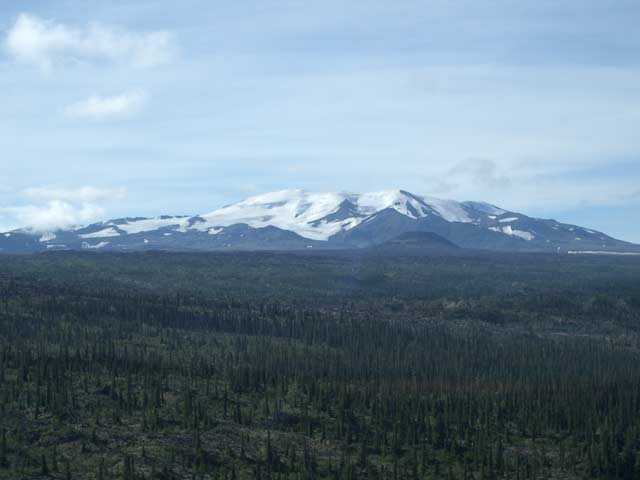
Mount Edziza in British Columbia, Canada

=== Antarctica ===
- Mount Discovery
- Mount Morning

=== Canada ===
- Armadillo Peak
- Ice Peak
- Ilgachuz Range
- Itcha Range
- Level Mountain
- Mount Edziza
- Rainbow Range
- Spectrum Range

=== Iceland ===
- Askja
- Eyjafjallajökull
- Krafla
- Ljósufjöll
- Prestahnúkur
- Snæfellsjökull
- Torfajökull
