= Langjökull =

Glacier in Iceland

- Lángjökull
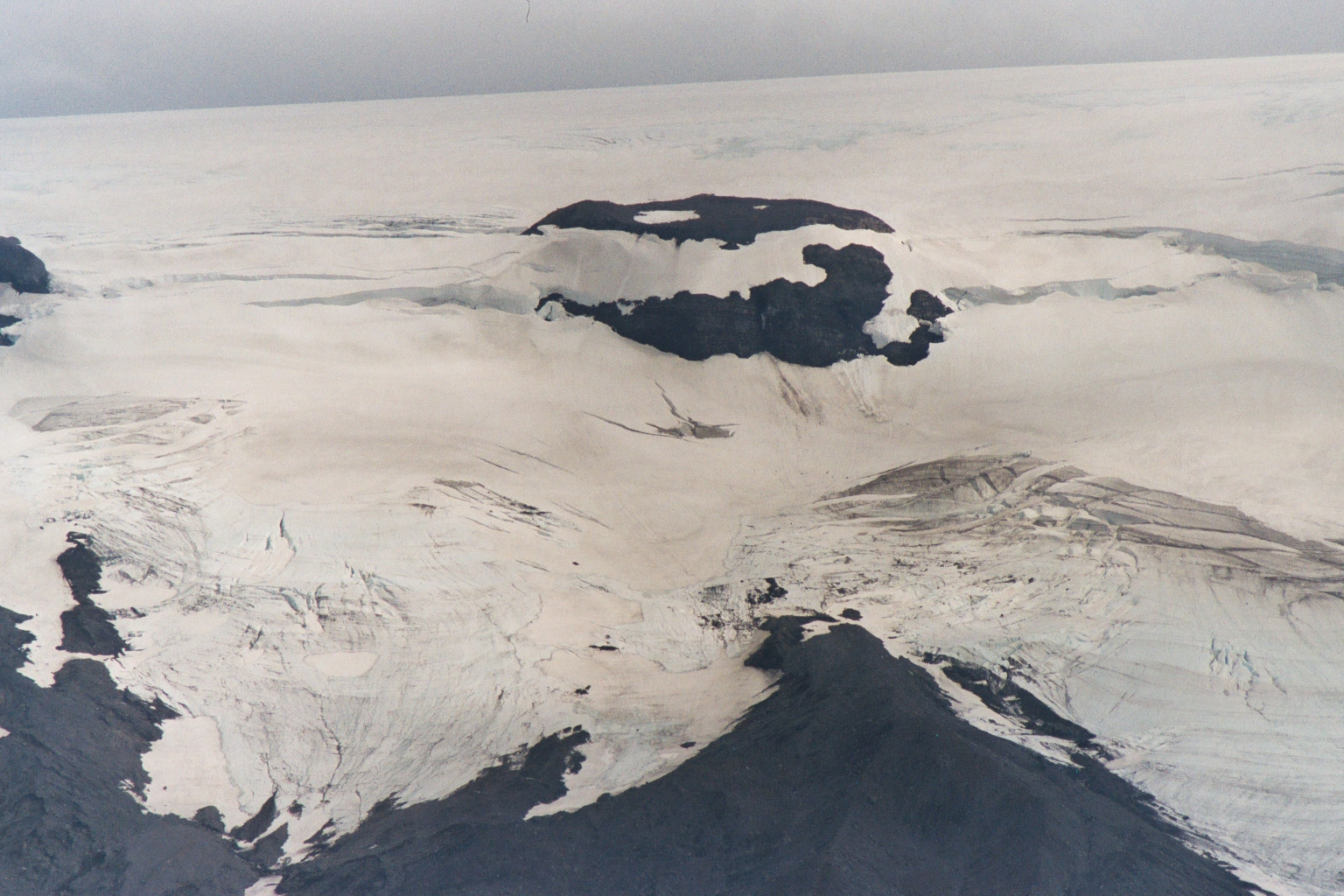
- Þórisjökull in the foreground, part of Langjökull in the background
- Map of Langjökull ice cap showing its named glacial catchments (light grey shading). Clicking on the map rectangle to enlarge it, enables mouse over that allows identification of individual named glacial catchments in Iceland.
- Type: Ice cap
- Location: Iceland
- Coordinates: 64.6918°N 20.1968°W
- Thickness: 580 m (1,900 ft)
- Terminus: from the north, Baldjökull, Pjófadalajökull, Hengibjörg, Leiðarjökull, Kirkjujökull, Norðurjökull, Skriðufell, Suðurjökull, Skálpanes, Jarlhettur, Eystri-Hagafellsjökull, Hagafell, Vestri-Hagafellsjökull, Lónsjökull, Geitlandsjökull, Svartárjökull', Flosajökull, Þrístapajökull
- Status: Retreating

Langjökull (Icelandic pronunciation: [ˈlauŋkˌjœːkʏtl̥], Icelandic for "long glacier") is the second largest ice cap in Iceland (870 km^{2} (340 sq mi)), after Vatnajökull. It is situated in the west of the Icelandic interior or Highlands of Iceland and can be seen clearly from Haukadalur. It covers the higher parts of the Langjökull volcanic system.

Its volume is 195 km^{3} (47 cu mi) and the ice is up to 580 m (1,900 ft) thick. The highest point of the ice cap (at Baldjökull [ˈpaltˌjœːkʏtl̥] at the northern end of Langjökull) is about 1,450 m (4,760 ft) above sea level.

In the past, the largest recorded surface area was in 1840.

== Situation and form ==
The glacier is roughly parallel to the direction of the country's active volcanic zone: north-east to south-west. It is about 50 km (31 mi) long and 15 to 20 km (9.3 to 12.4 mi) wide, and has a slightly narrower point roughly between the lake Hvítárvatn on the Kjölur mountain road to the east and the Þrístapajökull glacier to the west, near another smaller glacier, Eiríksjökull, which is not quite connected to Langjökull. It is the nearest large glacier to Reykjavík.

The area of the glacier includes some mountains, e.g. Jarlhettur ([ˈja(r)tl̥ˌhɛhtʏr̥]; "The earl's hat") on the east side of Langjökull, a palagonitic mountain range, which originated in a fissure vent under a glacier during the Ice Age.

The mountain Skríðufell [ˈskriːðʏˌfɛtl̥] (1,235 m (4,052 ft)) is situated on the east, above lake Hvítárvatn. Other mountains on the eastern side of Langjökull are Fjallkirkja [ˈfjatl̥ˌcʰɪr̥ca] (1,177 m (3,862 ft)), Þursaborg [ˈθʏr̥saˌpɔrk] (1,290 m (4,230 ft)) and Péturshorn [ˈpʰjɛːtʏr̥sˌhɔ(r)tn̥] (1,370 m (4,490 ft)).

A little to the east of Fjallkirkja is the hut of the Icelandic Glacier Research Society (also called Jöklarannsóknarfélag in the Jöklarannsóknafélag Íslands), which includes scientists as well as interested amateurs.

== Glaciers in the area ==
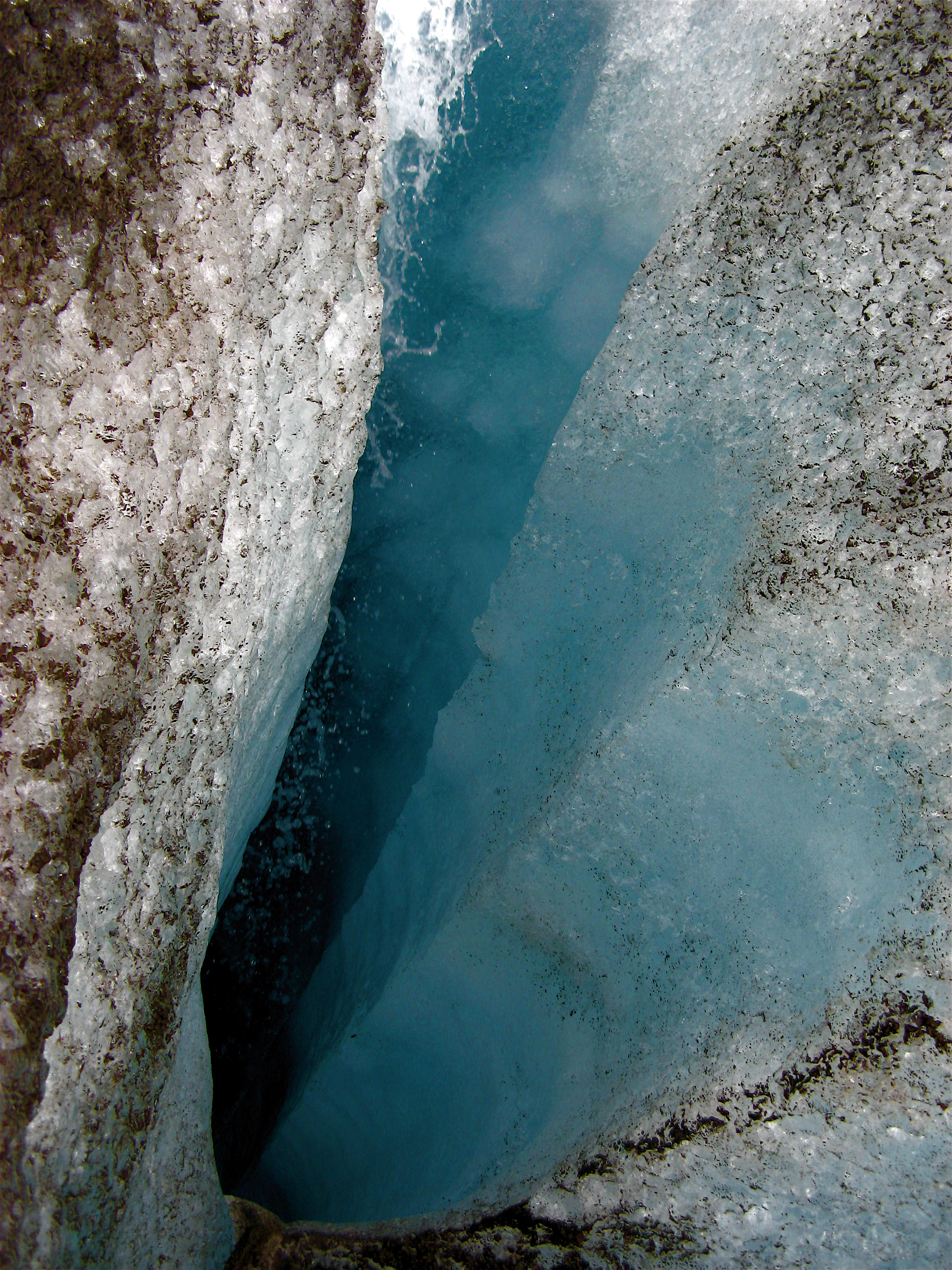
A moulin in the Langjökull glacier

A number of outlet glaciers reach down from Langjökull to the valleys and plains below. However various different names exist for these outlet areas and there are outlet areas that do not have glacial names. The outlets include Norðurjökull [ˈnɔrðʏrˌjœːkʏtl̥] and Suðurjökull [ˈsʏːðʏrˌjœːkʏtl̥] to the east, separated by the Skriðufell glacier outlet area; Eystri-Hagafellsjökull (Hagafellsjökull eystri) [ˈeistrɪ-] at the southern end of Langjökull which is separated from Suðurjökull by the Skálpanes and Jarlhettur glacier outlet areas; the mountain Hagafell [ˈhaːɣaˌfɛtl̥] which is also a small outlet area between Eystri-Hagafellsjökull and Vestri-Hagafellsjökull (Hagafellsjökull vestari) [ˈvɛstrɪ-ˌhaːɣaˌfɛlsˌjœːkʏtl̥]; Lónsjökull (Lónjökull) between it and Geitlandsjökull (1,395 m (4,577 ft)) an outpost to the south-west, with its glacier covering a tuya; Svartárjökull, Flosajökull (Flosakarðsjöklar catchment), Þrístapajökull [ˈθriːˌstaːpaˌjœːkʏtl̥] and Baldjökull to the west. From the north east on the far side of the Baldjökull catchment there is Pjófadalajökull, Hengibjörg, Leiðarjökull and Kirkjujökull catchments. The old icecap marginal glacier name of Bláfellsjökull for Suðurjökull is no longer used. (Note: The following outlet glacier names mentioned in text are not currently official, but are used in acaedemic papers - Lónjökull as Lónsjökull, Hagafellsjökull eystri, Hagafellsjökull vestari, Svartárjökull, and Flosakarðsjöklar. The names Regnbúðarjökull and Skjaldbreiðarjökull are no longer used and are not official either.) Research shows that the outlet glaciers Norðurjökull and Suðurjökull reached as far as lake Hvítárvatn until about 1900 but have retreated rapidly since then.

== Water flow and development of the glacier ==
Despite the size of Langjökull, not many rivers directly originate there. However research has shown that large quantities of water flow in sub-surface streams to lake Þingvallavatn (some 50 km (31 mi) to the south and easily accessible to tourists) and reappear in springs in and around the lake, while the same happens on the west side, giving rise to various tributaries of the Hvítá River as well as some rivers flowing north towards Húnaflói. Thus many of the hot springs in the Borgarfjörður region (near the estuary of the Hvítá on the west coast), such as Deildartunguhver, receive ground water from Langjökull.

The same is true for the lake Hvítárvatn to the east: two-thirds of its waters appear to come from Langjökull by underwater channels.

Langjökull is shrinking quite fast, and some researchers believe that it will disappear in about 150 years if climate change continues at its recent pace.

== Volcanism ==
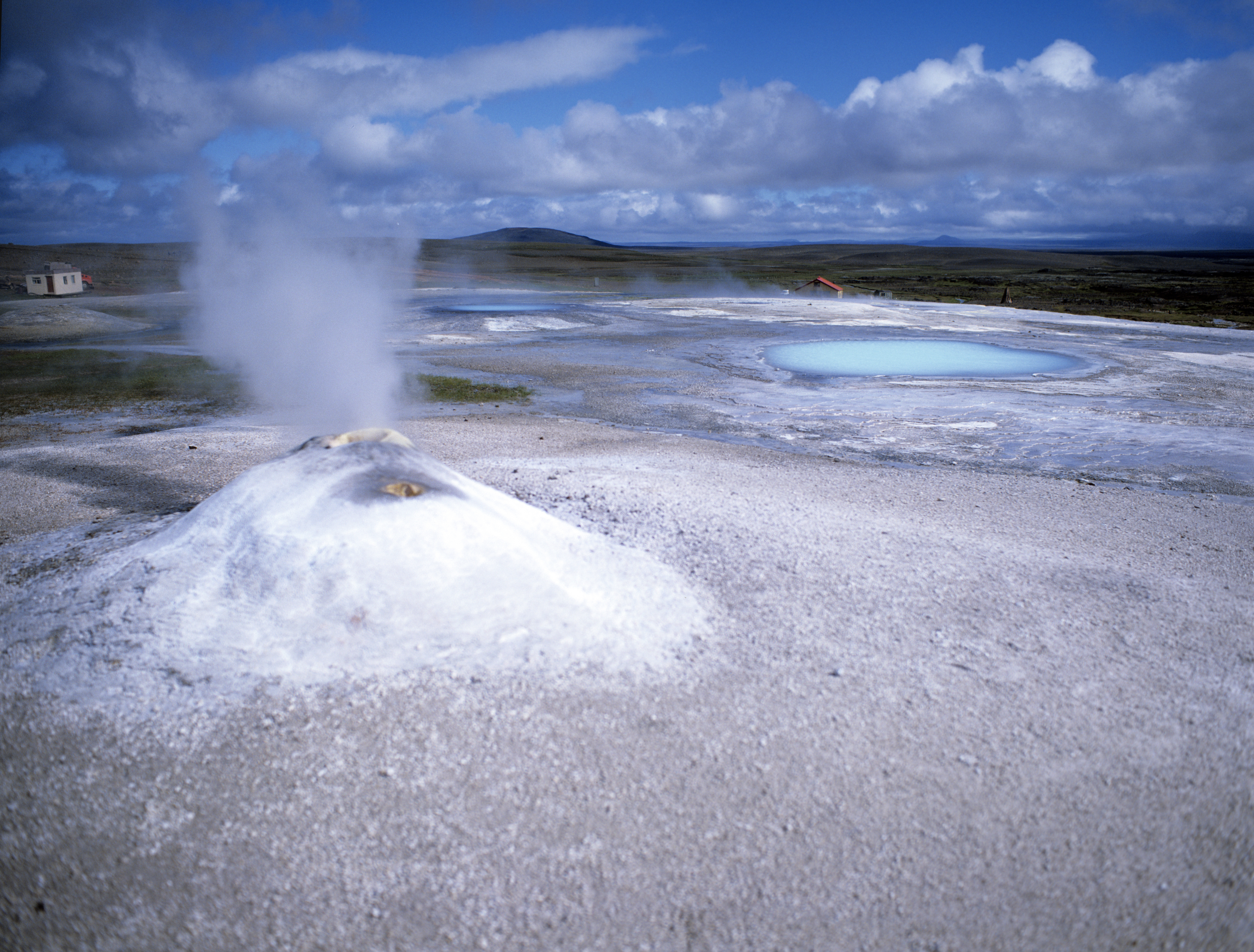
Hveravellir

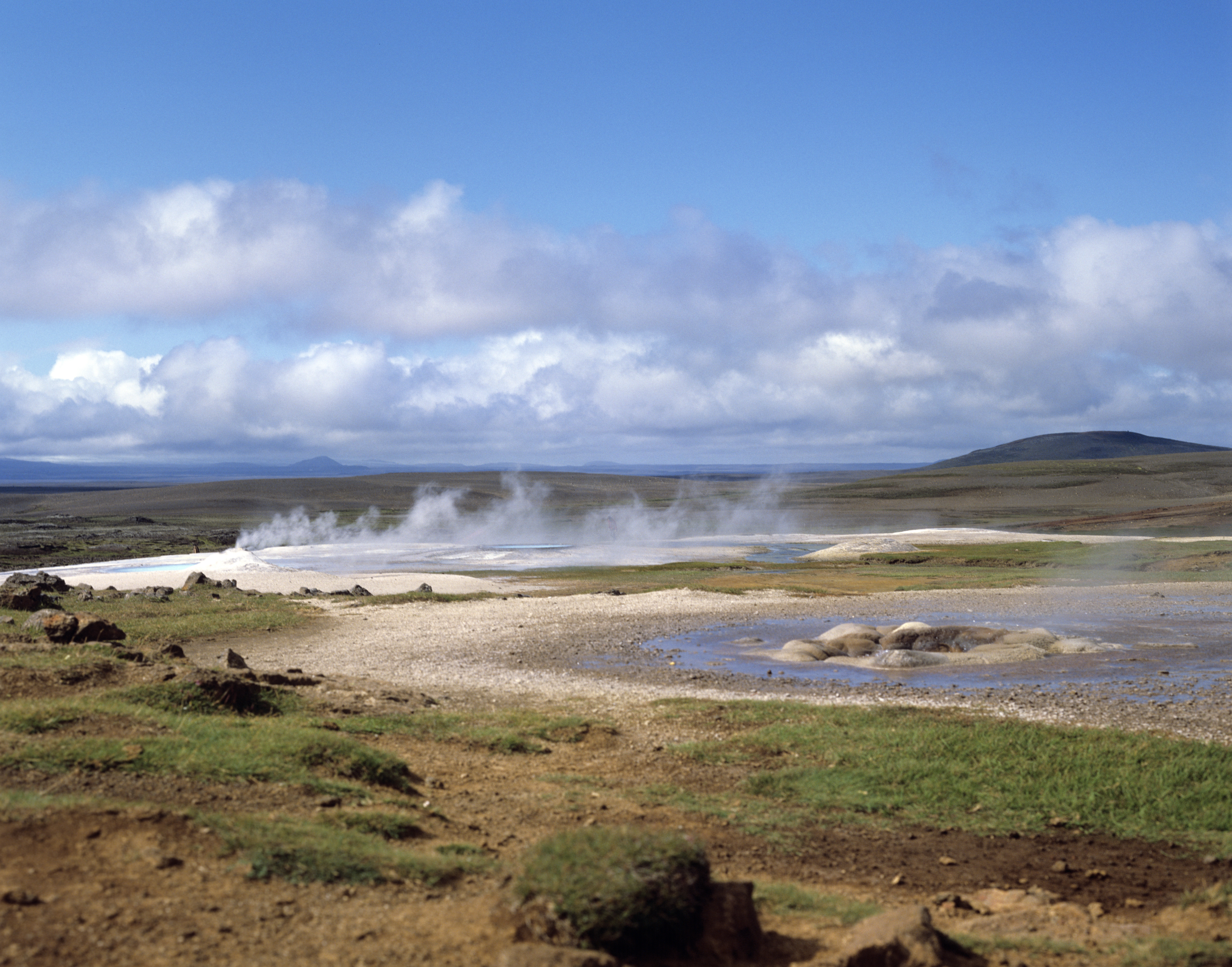
At Hveravellir

Under Langjökull there are volcanoes with several components. The calderas can easily be seen from the air. The best known of these is Hveravellir with its hot spring and high temperature area to the east of the glacier. During an Ice Age some shield volcanoes of this system covered the plains with lava in the region of today's Kjölur mountain road: the Kjalhraun ([ˈcʰalˌr̥œyːn]; hraun means "lava field"). Some of this lava field is about 7,800 years old.

A smaller volcanic system lies to the north-west of the glacier in the Arnarvatnsheiði [ˈa(r)tnarˌvasːˌheiːðɪ], north of the glacier Eiríksjökull. About 1,000 years ago, the craters of this system produced the lava field Hallmundarhraun [ˈhatl̥ˌmʏntar̥ˌr̥œyːn] which extends some 50 km (31 mi) westward into the valley of the Hvítá, and is traversed by underground streams which emerge at the waterfalls of Hraunfossar not far from Húsafell.

Another volcanic system to the south-west of Langjökull is Presthnúkur, named after its central volcano, a rhyolite dome with a high temperature area at its foot. Its fissures extend under Langjökull.

Volcanically, the region is relatively quiet, compared to other regions in Iceland, with just 32 eruptions in the last 10,000 years.

== Highland roads ==
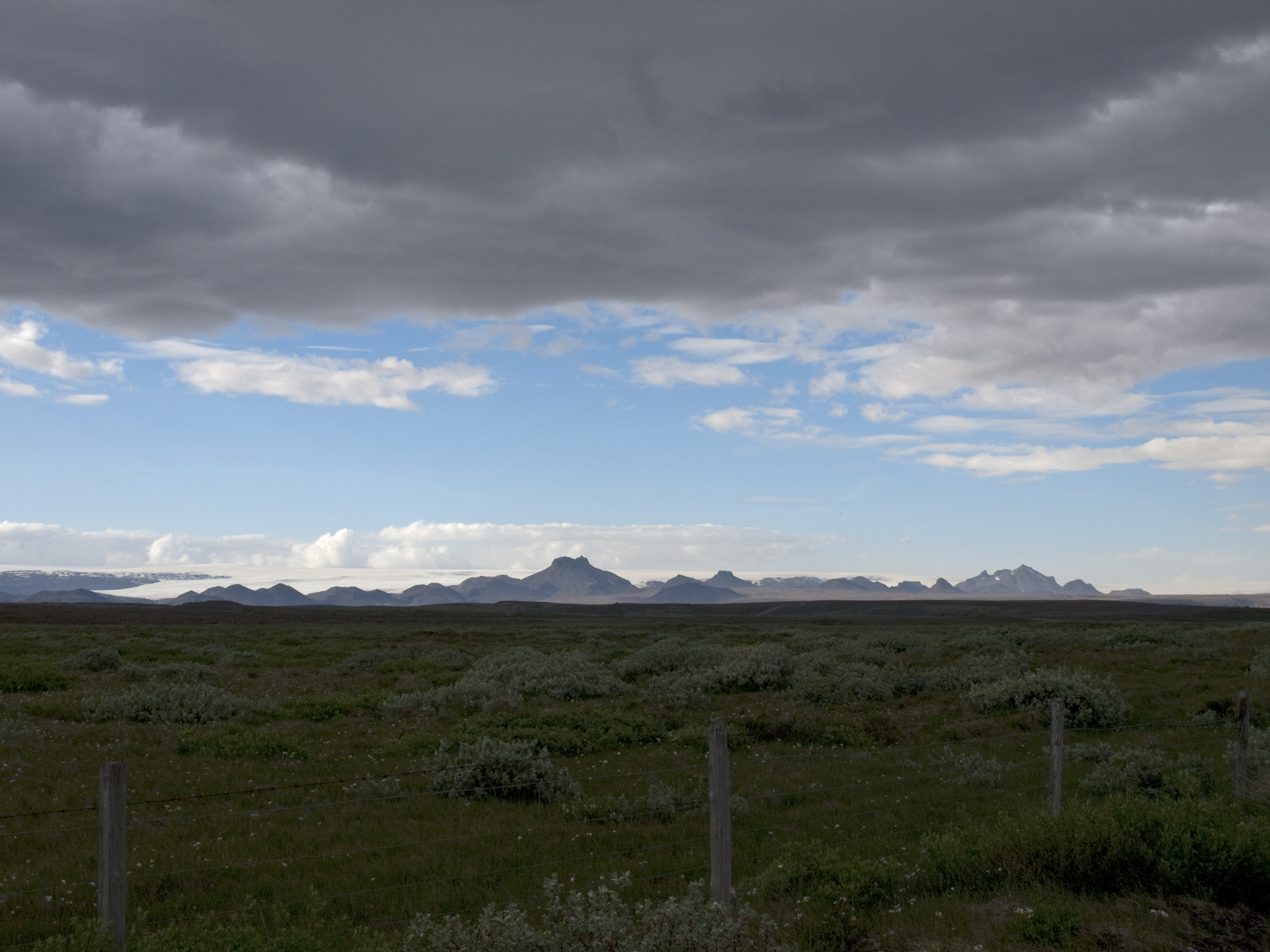
The southeastern tongue of Langjökull, as seen from the Gullfoss waterfall.

Two highland tracks, open in the summer months, lead alongside this glacier: the Kaldidalur and Kjölur tracks.

The former (road 550) runs along the west of Langjökull, between it and the small Ok glacier. To the south it leads towards Þingvellir and Reykjavík, while to the north it leads to the Hvítá valley which leads down towards Borgarnes. Kaldidalur is no longer classified by the Icelandic road authorities as an F-road. Nevertheless, rental car companies forbid their clients to drive on the road with other cars than four-wheel drives. Road F551 goes right to the edge of the glacier from Kaldidalur.

The latter (road F35) runs along the east side of Langjökull, between it and Hofsjökull. It is the main route across the interior between the main population centres in the SW and the N of the country, but nevertheless traffic is extremely sparse.

== Tourism ==
Langjökull attracts visitors who are captivated by its immense size and natural beauty. The glacier offers a unique experience for adventure enthusiasts and nature lovers alike. With its easily accessible location in the Icelandic interior, Langjökull provides opportunities for various activities, such as glacier hiking, snowmobiling, monster truck ride, and exploring natural ice caves and man-made tunnels. These experiences provide a different perspective of the glacier and its surroundings, enhancing the overall visit to Langjökull.

Located near popular tourist routes like the Golden Circle, Langjökull holds a prominent position in Iceland's tourism industry. Its significant contribution to the surrounding natural wonders, such as Gullfoss waterfall and Geysir's geothermal area, adds to its allure. The glacier's proximity to these iconic sites makes it a sought-after destination for travelers seeking to witness the awe-inspiring effects of glacial forces on the landscape.

Visitors are encouraged to respect the environment and follow sustainable guidelines to ensure the long-term preservation of this glacier.

== In popular culture ==
The glacier is featured in the final scene of the 1999 animated film The Iron Giant, directed by Brad Bird, where the titular Giant's parts, scattered by his destruction at the film's climax, converge on his head to begin reassembling him.

The first chapter of the thriller novel The Last Orphan by Gregg Hurwitz takes place on top of the glacier.

== See also ==
- Geography of Iceland
- Iceland plume
- List of glaciers
- List of glaciers of Iceland
- List of islands of Iceland
- List of lakes of Iceland
- List of rivers of Iceland
- List of volcanoes in Iceland
- List of waterfalls of Iceland
