= Prestahnúkur =

Mountain in Iceland

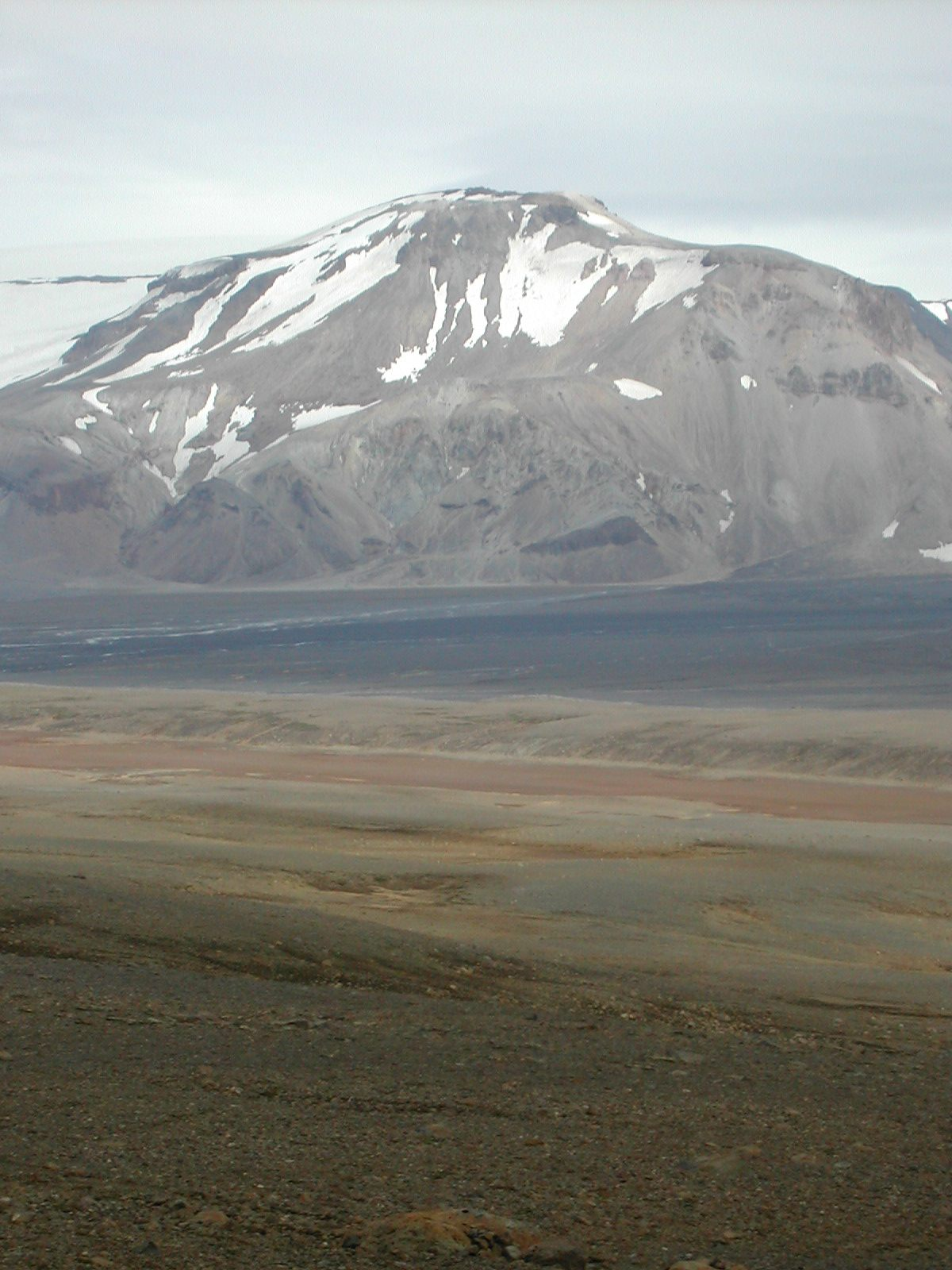
- Prestahnúkur

Highest point
- Elevation: 1,223 m (4,012 ft) (Note: There are multiple possible heights, but used here is the one for the Prestahnúkur peak itself which is without ice/snow cover for some of year. The fissure field to the south has icecap cover with National Landsurvey of Iceland giving a higher spot height currently of 1329 m and a historic height of 1350 m for this region outside the central volcano. Catalogue of Icelandic Volcanoes gives 1383 m in its Central Volcano section which presumably includes the ice of Geitlandsjökull and 1223 m in its Geological setting and tectonic context section on the entry for Prestahnúkur. GVS gives 1385 m which was an icecap height of Geitlandsjökull which has also varied historically downward from 1400 m as the ice has melted. The central volcano height is more correctly that of the terrain under Geitlandsjökull but a referenced height explicitly without the ice needs to be identified.)
- Coordinates: 64°35′N 20°40′W

Naming
- English translation: peak of the priests
- Language of name: Icelandic

Geography
- Selected geological features near the Prestahnúkur volcanic system (red outlines). Approximate surface mapping of lava flows mentioned in text are shades of violet from most recent to the oldest (Ok shield volcano) being the lightest. Legend: Other shading shows: '"`UNIQ--templatestyles-00000004-QINU`"' calderas; '"`UNIQ--templatestyles-00000005-QINU`"' central volcanoes; '"`UNIQ--templatestyles-00000006-QINU`"' fissure swarms; '"`UNIQ--templatestyles-00000007-QINU`"' subglacial terrain above 1,100 m (3,600 ft); '"`UNIQ--templatestyles-00000008-QINU`"' seismically active areas; Clicking on the rectangle in the image enlarges to full window and enables mouse-over with more detail.
- Location: Iceland

Geology
- Mountain type: Subglacial
- Last eruption: about 900 CE

Prestahnúkur on the map of Iceland

The peak Prestahnúkur (Icelandic pronunciation: [ˈpʰrɛstaˌn̥uːkʏr̥]) with a height of 1,223 m (4,012 ft), is in the Western Volcanic Zone to the west of the Highlands of Iceland to the west of Langjökull glacier, or to be more specific, to the west of Geitlandsjökull glacier, a part of the Langjökull. The volcano Prestahnúkur includes the terrain under the Geitlandsjökull glacier continuous to the peak and also includes fissure fields to its north and south.

== The volcanic system ==
The central volcano Prestahnúkur consists of a rhyolite tuya that was formed entirely under ice, and has been dated as 89 ± 24 ka, but another dating is about 60 ka. Two vents have been found. At the base of the northern flank is a geothermal area, with the rhyolite and hot springs suggesting that a long-lived magma chamber is or has been present. There has been intermittent seismic activity, mostly in an area about 8 km (5.0 mi) wide centred at the central volcano, but as no dyke intrusions have been observed, so it is unproven that the volcano is active.

In 2009 geologists in their research of earthquake events in the area showed that volcanic fissures lie in direction southwest–northeast and reach under the glaciers Þórisjökull and Geitlandsjökull-Langjökull. The Prestahnúkur fissure swarm has subsequently been defined as extending both to the north and south of the central volcano with a total length between 40–80 km (25–50 mi) and width up to 20 km (12 mi). To the north the Hallmundarhraun lava flow is believed to have most likely erupted sometime between 782 and 860 CE and extends well beyond Eiríksjökull. The Jökulkrókur lava to its west is between 1800 and 4500 years BP and one of the Geitlandshraun lava flows to its south-east has been dated to 8900 years BP. The other Geitlandshraun lava flow is under ice just north of the central volcano and is undated, but older. The Ok shield volcano rises to a height of 1,141 m (3,743 ft) to the east-nor-east of the central volcano. To the south-east of the central volcano some of the fissure swarm is now covered by lava from the Skjaldbreiður shield volcano which is in a neighbouring volcanic system. The southern extent of the fissure swarm is unclear and may overlap with that of the Hengill volcanic system. Intraglacial volcanic formations in the fissure swarm include tuyas produced by fissure eruptions through single vents and tindars. Apart from the Hrúðurkarlar tindars which cut obliquely across the swarm, the tindars parallel the fissure swarm at a strike of about 30°.

=== Rock Geology ===
The central volcanoes rhyolite has for Iceland a high silica content of about 77%, and must have come from a single batch of magma over a relatively short time span of less than 20 years. It was for some time a popular exploited construction material, partly for export. But the mine has been closed. (Note: ? Íslandshandbókin as source) The fissure swarm lavas are basaltic olivine tholeiite.

== The name ==
The name means "peak of the priests".

The origin of the name was an expedition of two priests into the highlands in the 17th century. It was seen as quite an enterprise at the time when they went into this region. They explored especially a valley behind the Þórisjökull called Þórisdalur, which had a bad reputation in sagas and folk stories because it was believed to be haunted by ghosts and that lawless people would be living there. As is clear today, they found nothing of the sort, but they were regarded as heroes when they came back from this expedition.

== Highland Road Kaldidalur and mountaineering ==
The highland road Kaldadalsvegur is situated not far from the mountain and it is possible to access the mountain by a bad jeep track and climb it.

== See also ==
- List of mountains in Iceland
- Volcanism of Iceland
  - List of volcanic eruptions in Iceland
  - List of volcanoes in Iceland

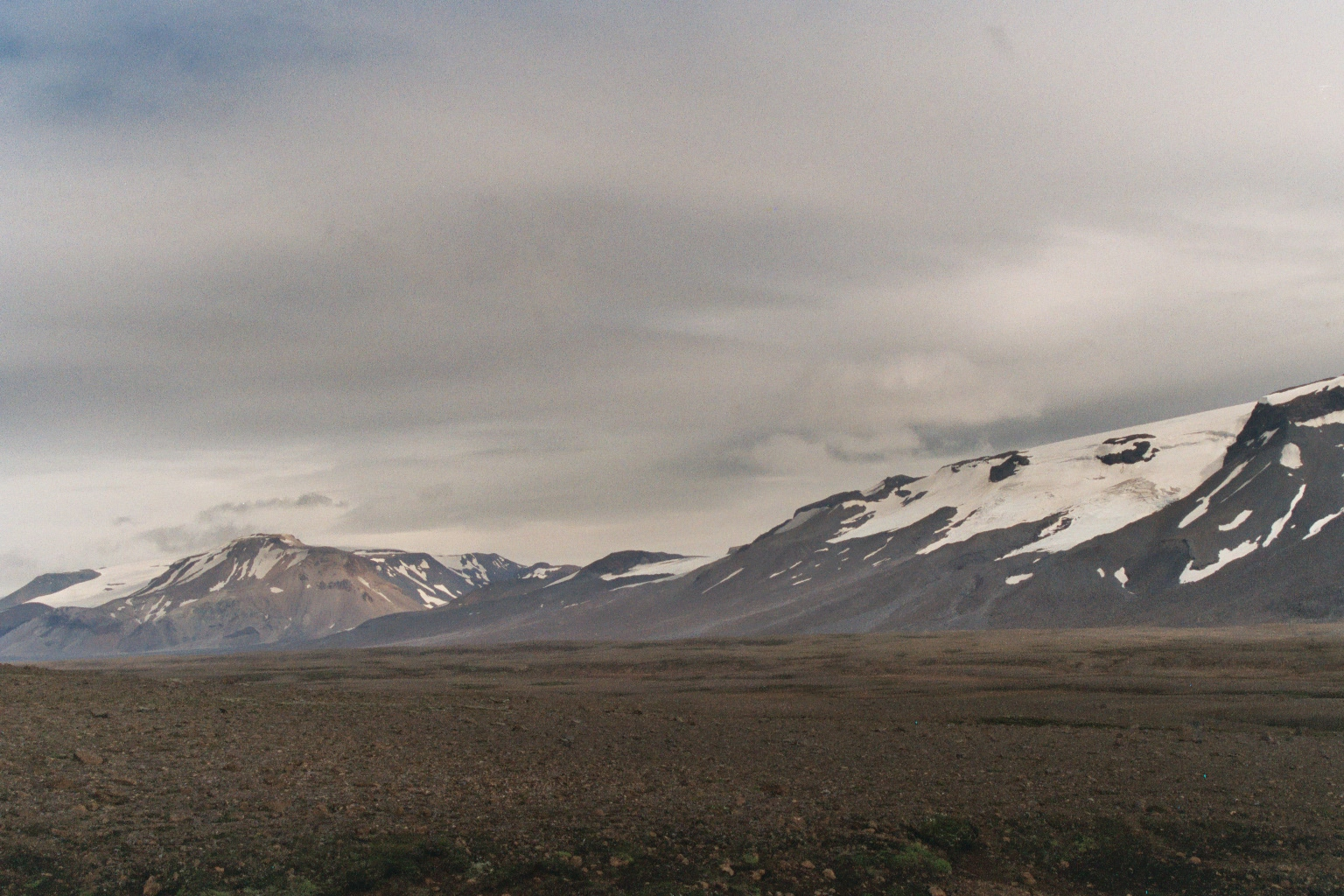
Prestahnúkur seen from Kaldidalur Highland road
