= List of glaciers in Iceland =

Map of larger glacial catchments in Iceland (light grey shading with white outline). Clicking on the map to enlarge it enables mouse over that allows identification of individual catchments.

The glaciers and ice caps of Iceland covered 11% of the land area of the country, up to about 2008. As of 2019 this was down to 10%. They have a considerable impact on its landscape and meteorology. Glaciers are also contributing to the Icelandic economy, with a tourist market that includes glacier trips on snowmobiles and glacier hiking tours. However, the recent loss of ice due to climate change is an increasing concern in Icelandic society.

== Description ==
Glaciers can both grow in size and regress depending upon several factors of which climate and precipitation in the glaciers catchment are the most important. About 7,000 years ago, the Pleistocene ice from the last Ice Age over Iceland disappeared almost entirely, so the current glaciers in Iceland are not that old. In the case of Iceland as several large glaciers are over active volcanoes, geothermal melting can be a substantial component of the glacier ice mass balance. Accordingly Iceland's glacier area varies from year to year and some glaciers may grow while others regress. The tables below have to be interpreted considering such variations in time and do not include much other data that those who study glaciers would regard as important. Data that was gathered over many years in the 1890s, or even by the first complete aerial photographic survey between 1945 and 1946 is difficult to compare to the richer satellite studies and the on the ground measurements possible since the 1990's but such comparisons have been attempted. Even so there are gaps in the data (see Table 2). Two different definitions of a glacier are usually used in current research and much Iceland work is closer to the definition:

A perennial mass of ice, and possibly firn and snow, originating on the land surface by the recrystallization of snow or other forms of solid precipitation and showing evidence of past or present flow

— International Association of Hydrological Sciences,

An ice cap is a mass of glacial ice that covers less than 50,000 km^{2} (19,000 sq mi) of land area covering a highland area and they feed outlet glaciers. Many Icelandic ice caps and glaciers lie above volcanoes, such as Grímsvötn and Bárðarbunga, which lie under the largest ice cap, Vatnajökull. The caldera of Grímsvötn is about 100 km^{2} (39 sq mi) in area, and Bárðarbunga is about 60 km^{2} (23 sq mi) meaning a large amount of ice, given mean icecap thickness of about 200 m (660 ft) is at risk of geothermal melting.

When volcanic activity occurs under the glacier, the resulting meltwater can lead to a sudden glacial lake outburst flood, known in Icelandic as a jökulhlaup. However jökulhlaups are more commonly caused by accumulation of meltwater due to geothermal activity underneath the glacier. Jökulhlaups occasionally trigger volcanic eruptions through the sudden release of pressure. These eruptions occur towards the end of the Jökulhlaup.

The glaciers are relevant enough in Icelandic geography that the four largest are represented blank in most of the maps of the administrative divisions of Iceland smaller than the regions.

Iceland is losing ice due to climate change. In 2008 its glaciers still covered 11% of the land area of the country, at about 11,100 km^{2} (4,300 sq mi) out of the total area of 103,125 km^{2} (39,817 sq mi). As of 2019 this was down to 10%.

Okjökull in Borgarfjörður, West Iceland, has lost its glacier title and is now simply known as Ok, losing the Icelandic word for glacier, jökull, as a suffix. In order to fit the criteria glaciers need to be thick enough to sink and move under their own weight, which any ice remaining of Okjökull can not do. Okjökull is the first Icelandic glacier to lose this title in an official manner, but tens of smaller glaciers have disappeared up to 2019.

== Largest glaciers by surface area ==
Location of the 13 largest glaciers within Iceland

Table 1: 13 Largest Glaciers
	Glacier or Ice Cap	Area km^{2}	Volume km^{3}	Elevation m	Coordinates
1	Vatnajökull	8,300	3,100	2,109.6	64°24′N 16°48′W
2	Langjökull	953	195	1,360	64°45′N 19°59′W
3	Hofsjökull	925	208	1,765	64°49′N 18°49′W
4	Mýrdalsjökull	596	140	1,493	63°40′N 19°06′W
5	Drangajökull	160		925	66°09′N 22°15′W
6	Eyjafjallajökull	78		1,666	63°38′N 19°36′W
7	Tungnafellsjökull	48		1,535	64°45′N 17°55′W
8	Þórisjökull	32		1,350	64°32′31″N 20°42′56″W
9	Eiríksjökull	22		1,672	64°46′24″N 20°24′34″W
10	Þrándarjökull	22		1,236	64°42′08″N 14°54′09″W
11	Tindfjallajökull	19		1,462	63°48′N 19°35′W
12	Torfajökull	15		1,190	63°53′39″N 19°07′37″W
13	Snæfellsjökull	11		1,446	64°48′32″N 23°46′16″W

These 13 largest glaciers had, at slightly different times around the year 2000, an aggregate area of 10,863 km^{2} (4,194 sq mi) (out of about 11,079 km^{2} (4,278 sq mi) for all glaciers of Iceland). The total glacial area in 2019 was down to 10,400 km^{2} (4,000 sq mi), and had decreased by more than 2,200 km^{2} (850 sq mi) since the end of the 19th century.

== Glaciers ==
Glacier locations in Iceland as on this page

The list of glaciers below and their characteristics is incomplete. Many of the smaller glaciers that are presently only glacier remnants have not been added to the list. There are for example over 170 glaciers on the Tröllaskagi peninsula, northern Iceland and many have little significance or have regressed. Okjökull is mentioned in the table below although it is no longer recognised as a glacier as it has recent significance by its rate of disappearance of a large glacier due to climate change. In Iceland the recent maximum extent of glaciers occurred in a process from the onset of the Little Ice Age about 1450 CE and did not stop until about 1900 CE. Some outlet glaciers have shown marked surges over relatively short periods of time resulting in growth in glacial size. This has only changed the recent overall trend to smaller total area of glacial ice for a brief period in 1963–1964 from a surge in Brúarjökull. Other glaciers have been linked, for example in the 1980s Mýrdalsjökull and Eyjafjallajökull were one continuous ice cap.

Table 2: Selected Iceland Glaciers
Name	Alternative Names (italics if historic)	Glacier type	Area in 1945 – 1946 (km^{2})	Other area (km^{2})	Other year	Area in 2019 (km^{2})	Loss 2019 from max. area	Ice cap grouping	Recent surges	Location
Vatnajökull	Austurjökular, Austurjökull, Grímsvatnajökull, Klofakjökull	ice cap	8326	8086	2000	7720	12 %	Vatnajökull	Yes	64°24′N 16°48′W
Brúarjökull	Jökuldalsjökull	outlet glacier		1600	2017			Vatnajökull	Yes	64°42′58″N 16°09′35″W
Eyjabakkajökull	Fljótsdalsjökull	outlet glacier						Vatnajökull	Yes	64°40′43″N 15°34′47″W
Kverkkvíslarjökull	Kverkjökull	outlet glacier						Vatnajökull	No	64°39′59″N 15°30′44″W
Kvíslarjökull		outlet glacier						Vatnajökull	No	64°39′49″N 15°28′18″W
Vesturdalsjökull		outlet glacier						Vatnajökull	No	64°38′45″N 15°21′52″W
Suðurfjallsjökull		outlet glacier						Vatnajökull	No	64°37′01″N 15°17′03″W
Axarfellsjökull	Öxarfellsjökull, Axarfjallsjökull, Axarjökull	outlet glacier						Vatnajökull	No	64°36′11″N 15°15′45″W
Norðurtungnajökull		outlet glacier remnant						Vatnajökull	No	64°34′38″N 15°19′34″W
Austurtungnajökull	Skyndidalsjökull	outlet glacier						Vatnajökull	No	64°33′20″N 15°20′02″W
Lambatungnajökull	Þórðarjökull, Lambatungujökull	outlet glacier						Vatnajökull	No	64°31′51″N 15°24′20″W
Hoffellsjökull	Norðurfellsjökull	outlet glacier						Vatnajökull	No	64°27′35″N 15°30′59″W
Svínafellsjökull (Eastern)		outlet glacier						Vatnajökull	No	64°26′31″N 15°30′39″W
Viðborðsjökull		outlet glacier						Vatnajökull	No	64°26′35″N 15°38′27″W
Fláajökull	Mýrajöklar, Mýrajökull, Hólmsárjökull, Hólsárjökull	outlet glacier						Vatnajökull	No	64°21′55″N 15°39′08″W
Heinabergsjökull	Eystri-Heinabergsjökull, Heinabergsjökull eystri, Heiðnabergsjökull, Heinabergsjöklar, Heinabergsjökull, Mýrajöklar	outlet glacier						Vatnajökull	No	64°19′33″N 15°50′29″W
Skálafellsjökull	Vestri-Heinabergsjökull, Heinabergsjökull vestri, Heinabergsjökull vestari, Heinabergsjöklar, Heinabergsjökull	outlet glacier						Vatnajökull	No	64°16′46″N 15°54′10″W
Eyvindstungnajökull	Sultartungnajökull, Sultartungujökull, Hálsajökull	outlet glacier						Vatnajökull	No	64°14′55″N 15°48′13″W
Birnudalsjökull		outlet glacier remnant						Vatnajökull	No	64°14′34″N 15°55′14″W
Breiðamerkurjökull		ice dome						Vatnajökull	Yes	64°07′50″N 16°21′26″W
Brókarjökull	Steinajökull	outlet glacier						Vatnajökull	No	64°15′38″N 16°08′20″W
Fellsárjökull	Fellsjökull, Bríkurjökull, Þverártindsjökull	outlet glacier						Vatnajökull	No	64°10′51″N 16°09′21″W
Norðlingalæðarjökull	Norðlingalægðarjökull	ice stream						Vatnajökull	No	64°07′19″N 16°16′03″W
Esjufjallajökull		ice stream						Vatnajökull	No	64°06′20″N 16°20′03″W
Mávabyggðajökull		ice stream						Vatnajökull	No	64°05′42″N 16°23′33″W
Öræfajökull	Hnappafellsjökull, Hnappavallajöklar, Hnappavallajökull, Knappafellsjökull, Sandfellsjökull, Jökull	ice dome						Öræfajökull/Vatnajökull	No	64°00′55″N 16°38′58″W
Fjallsjökull	Ærfjallsjökull, Hrútárjökull eystri, Eystri Hrútárjökull,Hrútárjökull	outlet glacier						Öræfajökull/Vatnajökull	No	64°01′51″N 16°28′49″W
Hrútárjökull	Hrútárjökull vestri, Hrútárjöklar	outlet glacier						Öræfajökull/Vatnajökull	No	64°00′25″N 16°29′46″W
Bræðrajökull	Breida	outlet glacier						Öræfajökull/Vatnajökull	No	63°59′02″N 16°31′54″W
Kviarjökull		outlet glacier						Öræfajökull/Vatnajökull	No	63°57′07″N 16°30′36″W
Hólárjökull		outlet glacier						Öræfajökull/Vatnajökull	No	63°57′08″N 16°34′39″W
Stigárjökull		outlet glacier						Öræfajökull/Vatnajökull	No	63°56′50″N 16°37′04″W
Stórhöfðajökull		outlet glacier						Öræfajökull/Vatnajökull	No	63°56′55″N 16°38′43″W
Gljúfursárjökull		outlet glacier						Öræfajökull/Vatnajökull	No	63°56′43″N 16°40′05″W
Rótarfjallsjökull	Rótarfjallsjökull (if combined with Kotárjökull)	outlet glacier						Öræfajökull/Vatnajökull	No	63°57′19″N 16°41′57″W
Kotárjökull	Rótarfjallsjökull (if combined with Rótarfjallsjökull), Flögujökull, Slögujökull	outlet glacier						Öræfajökull/Vatnajökull	No	63°57′27″N 16°43′22″W
Virkisjökull	Virkisajökull, Falljökull vestari	outlet glacier						Öræfajökull/Vatnajökull	No	63°58′44″N 16°48′03″W
Falljökull		outlet glacier						Öræfajökull/Vatnajökull	No	63°58′29″N 16°46′42″W
Svínafellsjökull	Svinafellsjökull	outlet glacier						Öræfajökull/Vatnajökull	No	64°00′57″N 16°50′20″W
Skaftafellsjökull	Skaptafellsjökull	outlet glacier						Öræfajökull/Vatnajökull	No	64°03′23″N 16°53′02″W
Skeiðarárjökull		outlet glacier		1380	2017			Vatnajökull	Yes	64°03′59″N 17°15′12″W
Grænalónsjökull		outlet glacier						Vatnajökull	No	64°12′52″N 17°30′34″W
Djúpárjökull	Kistufellsjökull	outlet glacier						Vatnajökull	No	64°11′55″N 17°34′14″W
Beinadalsjökull		outlet glacier						Vatnajökull	No	64°12′02″N 17°37′48″W
Síðujökull	Nyrðri-Skeiðarárjökull, Skeiðarárjökull nyrðri	outlet glacier						Vatnajökull	Yes	64°08′55″N 17°51′37″W
Skaftárjökull	Skaptárjökull	outlet glacier						Vatnajökull	No	64°13′23″N 18°02′17″W
Tungnaárjökull	Tungnaárjökull, Tungnárjöklar	outlet glacier						Vatnajökull	Yes	64°19′25″N 18°04′58″W
Sylgjujökull		outlet glacier						Vatnajökull	Yes	64°26′16″N 17°57′56″W
Köldukvíslarjökull		outlet glacier						Vatnajökull	Yes	64°34′35″N 17°49′56″W
Bárðarbunga	Bardarbunga, Bárđarjökull, Bárdharnúpur, Bárđargnípa	ice dome						Vatnajökull	No	64°37′52″N 17°30′20″W
Rjúpnabrekkujökull		outlet glacier						Vatnajökull	No	64°42′06″N 17°31′52″W
Dyngjujökull	Kistufellsjökull	outlet glacier		1000	2017			Vatnajökull	Yes	64°45′20″N 16°53′03″W
Kverkjökull		outlet glacier						Vatnajökull	No	64°42′12″N 16°37′42″W
Skarphéðinsjökull		outlet glacier						Vatnajökull	No	64°39′03″N 16°36′23″W
Langjökull	Lángjökull, Langijökull	ice cap	992	904	2007	836	24 %	Langjökull	Yes	64°45′N 19°59′W
Baldjökull		outlet and ice dome glacier		100	2007			Langjökull	No	64°49′05″N 19°56′59″W
Þjófadalajökull	Fúlukvíslarjökull	outlet glacier		24	2007			Langjökull	No	64°50′52″N 19°49′00″W
Leiðarjökull		outlet glacier		86	2007			Langjökull	No	64°47′21″N 19°47′05″W
Kirkjujökull		outlet glacier		23	2007			Langjökull	No	64°43′01″N 19°52′08″W
Norðurjökull	Nyrðri-Skriðjökull, Nyrðriskriðjökull	outlet glacier		62	2007			Langjökull	No	64°39′51″N 19°54′47″W
Suðurjökull	Fremri-Skriðjökull	outlet glacier		54	2007			Langjökull	Yes	64°35′34″N 19°58′55″W
Eystri-Hagafellsjökull	Hagafellsjökull eystri, Hagafellsjökull, Eystri-Hagafellsjökull, Hagavatnsjökull syðri	outlet glacier		111	2007			Langjökull	Yes	64°31′27″N 20°14′28″W
Vestari-Hagafellsjökull	Hagafellsjökull vestri, Hagafellsjökull, Vestri-Hagafellsjökull, Skjaldbreiðarjökull	outlet glacier		137	2007			Langjökull	Yes	64°31′39″N 20°25′34″W
Lónsjökull	Lónjökull	outlet glacier		137	2007			Langjökull	No	64°34′46″N 20°31′30″W
Geitlandsjökull		outlet glacier		13	2007			Langjökull	No	64°36′04″N 20°37′00″W
Svartárjökull		outlet glacier		39	2007			Langjökull	No	64°37′29″N 20°33′10″W
Þrístapajökull	Hallmundarjökull	outlet glacier		104	2007			Langjökull	Yes	64°44′33″N 20°10′53″W
Hofsjökull	Arnarfellsjökull	ice cap	948	889	1999	810	22 %	Hofsjökull	Yes	64°49′N 18°49′W
Austari-Jökulsárjökull		outlet glacier						Hofsjökull	No	64°56′23″N 18°42′47″W
Álftabrekkujökull		outlet glacier						Hofsjökull	No	64°52′36″N 19°01′41″W
Blautukvíslarjökull	Blautkvíslarjökull	outlet glacier						Hofsjökull	No	64°39′39″N 18°55′14″W
Blágnípujökull	Blágnýpujökull	outlet glacier						Hofsjökull	Yes	64°45′00″N 19°07′42″W
Blöndujökull		outlet glacier						Hofsjökull	Yes	64°47′03″N 19°06′07″W
Brattöldujökull		outlet glacier						Hofsjökull	No	64°42′46″N 19°03′12″W
Háöldujökull		outlet glacier						Hofsjökull	Yes	64°50′13″N 18°29′22″W
Illviðrajökull	Illviðrahnjúkajökull	outlet glacier						Hofsjökull	No	64°56′32″N 18°37′44″W
Klakksjökull	Klakkajökull	outlet glacier						Hofsjökull	No	64°51′16″N 18°30′08″W
Kvíslajökull		outlet glacier						Hofsjökull	Yes	64°51′22″N 19°07′11″W
Lambahraunsjökull		outlet glacier						Hofsjökull	No	64°57′29″N 18°52′55″W
Löngukvíslarjökull		outlet glacier						Hofsjökull	No	64°54′25″N 18°30′39″W
Miklafellsjökull		outlet glacier						Hofsjökull	No	64°52′21″N 18°31′35″W
Miklukvíslarjökull		outlet glacier						Hofsjökull	No	64°40′18″N 18°53′42″W
Múlajökull		outlet glacier						Hofsjökull	Yes	64°39′30″N 18°41′58″W
Nauthagajökull	Ólafsfellsjökull	outlet glacier						Hofsjökull	No	64°39′54″N 18°46′14″W
Rótarjökull		outlet glacier						Hofsjökull	No	64°42′21″N 18°41′26″W
Sátujökull	Eystri-Sátujökull, Lambahraunsjöklar	outlet glacier						Hofsjökull	Yes	64°56′34″N 18°57′11″W
Tungufönn		outlet glacier						Hofsjökull	No	64°52′39″N 18°29′13″W
Tvífellsjökull		outlet glacier						Hofsjökull	No	64°57′28″N 18°48′50″W
Þverfellsjökull		outlet glacier						Hofsjökull	No	64°42′09″N 19°01′35″W
Þjórsárjökull		outlet glacier						Hofsjökull	Yes	64°45′17″N 18°34′44″W
Mýrdalsjökull	Miđdalsjökull, Mirdalsjökull, Mýdalsjökull,Austrurjökull, Eyjafjallajökull, Höfđabrekkujökull, Höfđajökull, Höfđarjökull, Kötlugjárjökull, Kötlujökull, Sólheimajökull, Austurjökull, Þykkvabæjarjökull	ice cap	652	597	1999	520	29 %	Mýrdalsjökull	Yes	63°40′N 19°06′W
Entujökull		outlet glacier						Mýrdalsjökull	No	63°43′19″N 19°14′52″W
Hafursárjökull		outlet glacier						Mýrdalsjökull	No	63°33′36″N 19°06′24″W
Hrunárjöklar		outlet glacier						Mýrdalsjökull	No	63°38′23″N 19°21′44″W
Huldujökull	Hvítijökull	outlet glacier						Mýrdalsjökull	No	63°34′07″N 18°55′47″W
Jökulsárgilsjökull		outlet glacier						Mýrdalsjökull	No	63°36′00″N 19°19′15″W
Klifurárjökull	Klifandajökull, Klifandijökull	outlet glacier						Mýrdalsjökull	No	63°32′43″N 19°12′51″W
Krossárjökull		outlet glacier						Mýrdalsjökull	No	63°40′42″N 19°19′19″W
Kötlujökull	Höfðabrekkujökull ,Kötlufalljökull	outlet glacier						Mýrdalsjökull	No	63°35′13″N 18°51′03″W
Sandfellsjökull		outlet glacier						Mýrdalsjökull	No	63°40′20″N 18°53′37″W
Sléttjökull	Mælifellsjökull	outlet glacier						Mýrdalsjökull	Yes	63°46′31″N 19°05′34″W
Sólheimajökull		outlet glacier						Mýrdalsjökull	No	63°33′48″N 19°17′48″W
Mosakambsjökull	Thoroddsengletscher	outlet glacier						Mýrdalsjökull	No	63°32′59″N 19°02′38″W
Tungnakvíslarjökull		outlet glacier						Mýrdalsjökull	No	63°39′09″N 19°21′34″W
Öldufellsjökull		outlet glacier						Mýrdalsjökull	Yes	63°44′24″N 18°52′58″W
Drangajökull		ice cap	161	146	2004	137	49 %	Drangajökull	Yes	66°09′N 22°15′W
Kaldalónsjökull	Lónjökull	outlet glacier						Drangajökull	Yes	66°07′17″N 22°17′00″W
Leirufjarðarjökull	Leirujökull	outlet glacier						Drangajökull	Yes	66°11′40″N 22°25′03″W
Reykjarfjarðarjökull		outlet glacier						Drangajökull	Yes	66°11′41″N 22°10′46″W
Ljótarjökull		outlet glacier						Drangajökull	No	66°13′08″N 22°15′10″W
Þaralátursjökull		outlet glacier						Drangajökull	No	66°12′24″N 22°13′07″W
Jökulbunga		ice dome						Drangajökull	No	66°10′25″N 22°17′10″W
Eyjafjallajökull	Austurjökull, Hájökull	ice cap	87	80	2003	66	43 %	Eyjafjallajökull	No	63°38′N 19°36′W
Akstaðajökull	Kaplaskarðsjökull	outlet glacier						Eyjafjallajökull	No	63°38′24″N 19°42′12″W
Gígjökull	Falljökull, Skriðjökull	outlet glacier						Eyjafjallajökull	No	63°39′10″N 19°36′58″W
Hvannárjökull		outlet glacier						Eyjafjallajökull	No	63°38′25″N 19°29′09″W
Kaldaklifsjökull		outlet glacier						Eyjafjallajökull	No	63°35′48″N 19°32′20″W
Seljavallajökull	Tungugilsjökull	outlet glacier						Eyjafjallajökull	No	63°35′46″N 19°36′35″W
Steinsholtsjökull		outlet glacier						Eyjafjallajökull	No	63°39′10″N 19°33′17″W
Tungnafellsjökull		ice cap	40	38	2000	32	34 %	Tungnafellsjökull	No	64°45′N 17°55′W
Hagajökull fremri	Fremri-Hagajökull	outlet glacier						Tungnafellsjökull	No	64°45′01″N 17°58′40″W
Hagajökull innri	Innri-Hagajökull	outlet glacier						Tungnafellsjökull	No	64°46′10″N 17°56′38″W
Tungnajökull		outlet glacier						Tungnafellsjökull	No	64°46′43″N 17°53′07″W
Fellsjökull		outlet glacier						Tungnafellsjökull	No	64°45′51″N 17°49′54″W
Kaldagilsjökull		outlet glacier						Tungnafellsjökull	No	64°43′27″N 17°58′09″W
Þórisjökull	Thorisdalurjökull, Sudurjöklar	glacier	30	30	2000	23.8	46 %	Þórisjökull	No	64°32′31″N 20°42′56″W
Eiríksjökull	BallLjökull, Arnarvatnsjökull	ice cap	25.4	22	2000	20.5	45 %	Eiríksjökull	No	64°46′24″N 20°24′34″W
Brækur eystri	Eystri Bækur, Eystri-Brækur, Brækur, Brókarjöklar	outlet glacier						Eiríksjökull	No	64°47′57″N 20°23′33″W
Brækur vestri	Vestri Bækur, Brækur, Brókarjöklar	outlet glacier						Eiríksjökull	No	64°47′26″N 20°25′49″W
Klofajökull	Stórijökull	outlet glacier						Eiríksjökull	No	64°47′53″N 20°21′58″W
Þorvaldsjökull		outlet glacier						Eiríksjökull	No	64°46′44″N 20°20′43″W
Ögmundarjökull		outlet glacier						Eiríksjökull	No	64°47′20″N 20°21′47″W
Þrándarjökull	Thrándarjökull,Miđlandsjökull, Sviđinhornajökull	glacier	27	17	2000	14.2	59 %		No	64°42′08″N 14°54′09″W
Tindfjallajökull	Tindafjallajökull	glacier	16.8	15	2000	12.4	45 %		No	63°48′N 19°35′W
Snæfellsjökull	Snjófellsjökull, Snjófjallsjökull, Jökull, Vesturjökull	ice cap	13.9	12	2002	8.8	65 %	Snæfellsjökull	No	64°48′32″N 23°46′16″W
Blágilsjökull		outlet glacier						Snæfellsjökull	No	64°49′29″N 23°48′07″W
Hólatindajökull		outlet glacier						Snæfellsjökull	No	64°47′54″N 23°47′54″W
Hyrningsjökull		outlet glacier						Snæfellsjökull	No	64°48′50″N 23°45′18″W
Jökulhálsjökull		outlet glacier						Snæfellsjökull	No	64°49′11″N 23°46′24″W
Kvíahnúksjökull		outlet glacier						Snæfellsjökull	No	64°47′42″N 23°45′51″W
Torfajökull		glacier	16	11	1999	8.1	64 %	Torfajökull	No	63°53′39″N 19°07′37″W
Hrútfellsjökull	Hrútafellsjökull, Regnbúđajökull, Regnbogajökull, Regnbúđajöklar	ice cap	7.7	7	2000	4.4	59 %	Hrútfellsjökull	No	64°44′31″N 19°44′17″W
Miðjökull	Þríjökull	outlet glacier						Hrútfellsjökull	No	64°44′54″N 19°42′48″W
Norðvesturjökull		outlet glacier						Hrútfellsjökull	No	64°45′10″N 19°44′58″W
Vesturjökull	Þríjökull	outlet glacier						Hrútfellsjökull	No	64°45′05″N 19°43′34″W
Bláfellsjökull		glacier							No	64°30′30″N 19°50′15″W
Hofsjökull Eystri	Hofsjökull	glacier	7.1	5	2000	3.1	74 %		No	64°36′57″N 15°03′02″W
Okjökull	Ok	glacier remnant	7.4	4	2000	0.07	99 %		No	64°36′22″N 20°52′47″W
Kaldaklofsjökull		glacier	3.9			1.6	79 %		No	63°53′32″N 19°08′20″W
Snæfell		ice cap	5.3			4.4	45 %	Snæfell	No	64°47′51″N 15°33′44″W
Ljósurðarjökull		outlet glacier						Snæfell	No	64°47′55″N 15°34′38″W
Dökkurðarjökull		outlet glacier						Snæfell	No	64°48′11″N 15°35′14″W
Axlarjökull		outlet glacier						Snæfell	No	64°47′36″N 15°35′27″W
Sótajökull		glacier remnant						Snæfell	No	64°47′36″N 15°35′27″W
Dimmagilsjökull		outlet glacier						Snæfell	No	64°47′34″N 15°33′19″W
Lambadalsskarðsfönn		glacier remnant							No	65°55′09″N 23°07′59″W
Móafellsjökull		glacier remnant							No	65°52′53″N 18°57′10″W
Unadalsjökull		glacier remnant							No	65°51′22″N 18°58′16″W
Deildardalsjökull		glacier remnant							No	65°49′37″N 18°59′58″W
Búrfellsjökull		glacier							Yes	65°49′13″N 18°42′30″W
Teigardalsjökull		glacier							Yes	65°49′19″N 18°40′48″W
Hálsjökull		glacier							No	65°51′59″N 18°28′10″W
Vatnsdalsjökull		glacier remnant							No	65°31′32″N 18°40′06″W
Þverárjökull		glacier remnant							No	65°46′05″N 18°46′42″W
Tungnahryggsjökull		glacier remnant							No	65°40′54″N 18°50′31″W
Gljúfurárjökull		glacier							No	65°42′44″N 18°39′34″W
Barkárdalsjökull		glacier							No	65°39′18″N 18°50′10″W
Myrkárjökull		glacier							No	65°37′12″N 18°49′46″W
Hjaltadalsjökull		glacier							No	65°34′28″N 18°53′36″W
Vindheimajökull		glacier remnant							No	65°39′08″N 18°17′57″W
Fossárjökull		glacier							No	65°39′13″N 18°17′33″W
Húsárjökull		glacier							No	65°38′35″N 18°19′18″W
Bægisárjökull		glacier							Yes	65°35′03″N 18°22′26″W
Lambárdalsjökull		glacier							No	65°33′56″N 18°15′07″W
Glerárdalsjökull		glacier remnant							No	65°33′09″N 18°21′30″W

== See also ==
- Geography of Iceland
- List of glaciers
