= Ríkarður Jónsson =

Icelandic sculptor (1888–1977)

Ríkarður Jónsson (20 September 1888 – 17 January 1977) was an Icelandic sculptor.

== Early training ==
Ríkarður was born in the Icelandic east coast village of Djúpivogur. His mother was Ólöf Finnsdóttir and his father was Jón Þórarinsson. His early training was as a wood carver. From 1911 until 1914 he studied sculpture with Einar Jónsson, the Icelandic sculptor who had recently returned to Iceland from his studies in Europe. Following the completion of these studies Ásmundur Sveinsson apprenticed with Ríkarður from 1915 to 1919.

Ríkarður Jónsson Workshop in Djúpivogur

== The Seal of Iceland ==
In 1918 a competition that attracted many of the Icelandic artists of the day was held to create a new coat of arms for Iceland. The design was to be based on the writings of Snorri Sturluson in Heimskringla. The competition was won by Ríkarður and his composition was to remain the Icelandic coat of arms until being redesigned by Tryggvi Magnusson following Icelandic independence from Denmark in 1944. Although the four figures in the design remained the same, they are proportioned differently in the new design. The main difference, however, between the 1918 and 1944 conception is one of content: the removal of the crown of the King of Denmark that sat on top of Ríkarður Jónsson's design.

== Career ==
Many of the works produced by Ríkarður during his career were woodcarvings. However he was also one of Iceland's primary portraitists during that time, creating numerous busts and bas-reliefs of his fellow countrymen and women. Many of these works can be found in the graveyards of Iceland, particularly in Reykjavík's Hólavallagarður Cemetery.

One of his best known works is a bas-relief of Sigríður Tómasdóttir, the heroine of Gullfoss.

In 1955 Ríkarður carved the Icelandic birch gavel and striking board used at the United Nations.

== Ríkarður Jónsson Museum ==
Langa-Búð, the oldest house (built in 1790) in Djúpivogur, the village Ríkarður was born in, has been converted into a cultural center and it includes a section devoted to Ríkarður's life and work.

Ríkarður Jónsson Museum in Djúpivogur

== Public monuments in Reykjavík ==
- Tryggvi Gunnarsson, (1835–1917), 1917
- Bishop Jon Vidalin, (1666–1720), 1920
- Memorial to Jean-Baptiste Charcot, (1867–1936), 1952
- Þorsteinn Erlingsson, (1858–1914)
- numerous monuments in Hólavallagarður Cemetery
