= Hvítá (Árnessýsla) =

River in Iceland

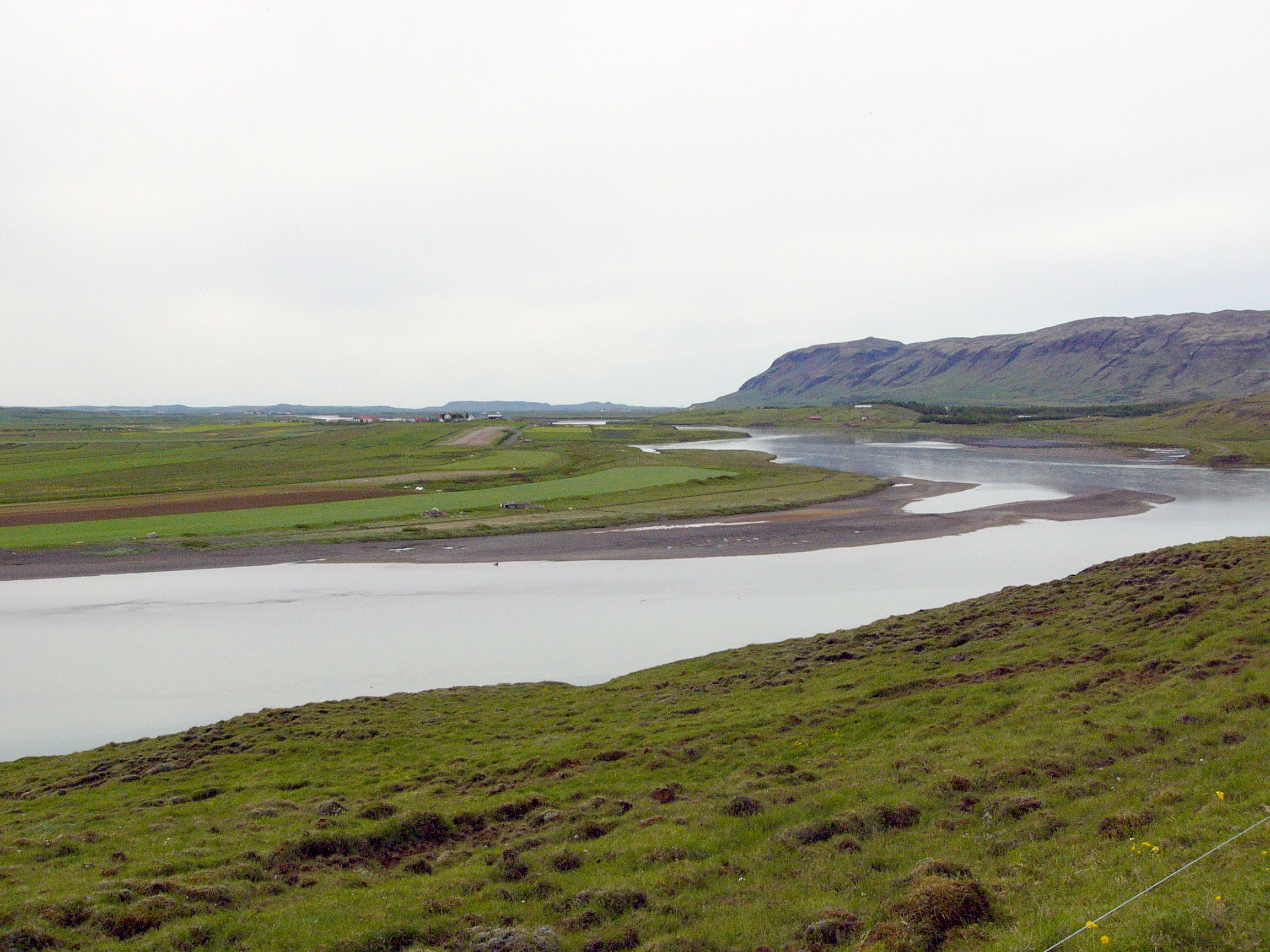
The Hvítá near Laugarás

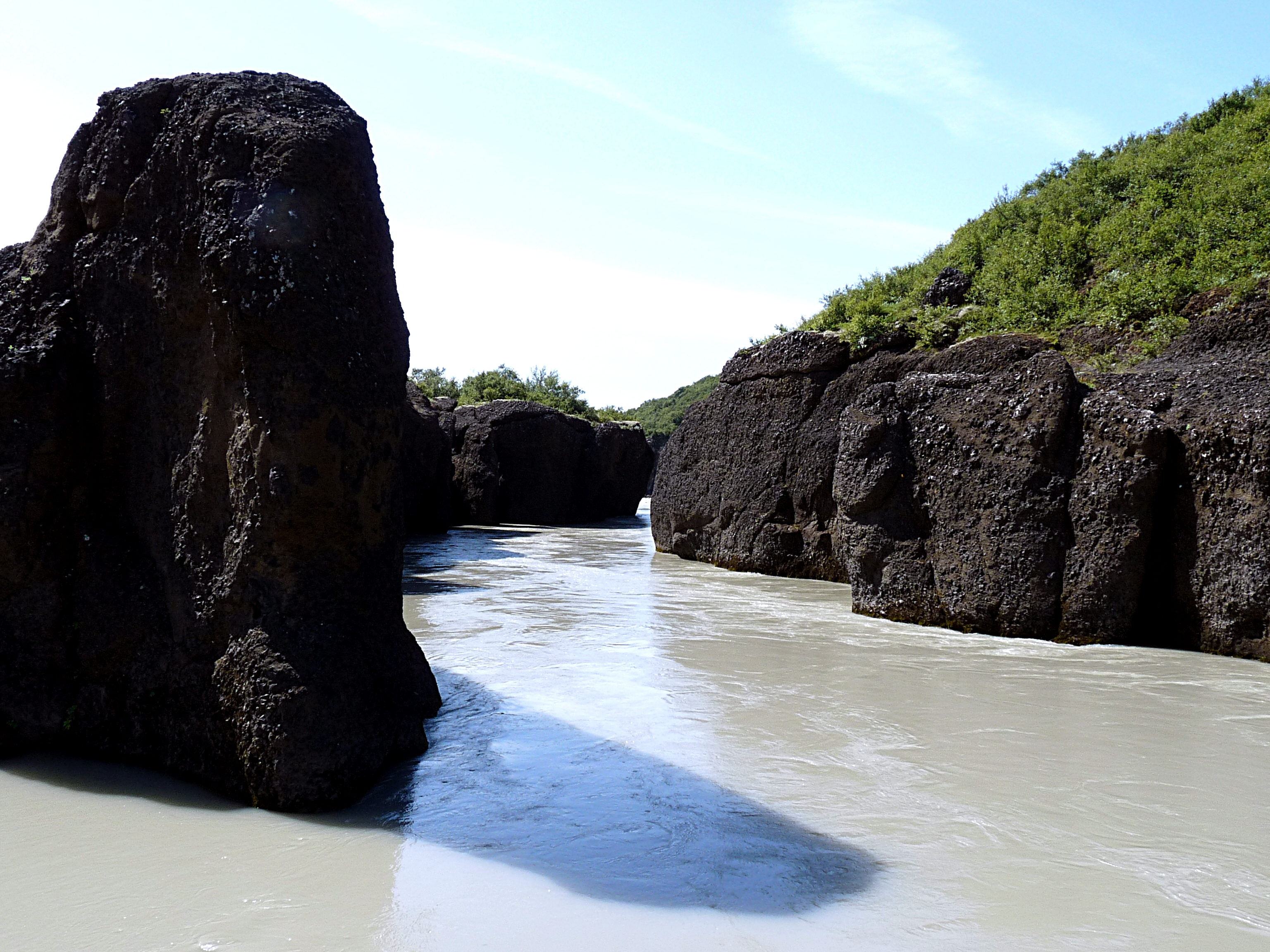
Hvítá near Brúarhlöð

Hvítá (Icelandic [ˈkʰviːtˌauː], "white river") is a river in Iceland that begins at Hvítárvatn glacier lake on Langjökull glacier in the highlands of Iceland at 64°37′N 19°50′W. The river flows for 40 kilometres (25 mi) before dropping down into a narrow gorge at Gullfoss waterfall.

Thereafter, the river flows between Biskupstungur and Hrunamannahreppur districts. Here, Hvítá combines with three other rivers: Tungufljót, Brúará, and Stóra-Laxá, doubling the volume of the river. It proceeds to run through the flatlands near Grímsnes and behind Ingólfsfjall mountain. Just north of Selfoss town, it meets Sog River where it becomes Ölfusá as it flows into the Atlantic Ocean.

Because of danger of flooding, especially during winter, Hvítá has a reputation of being the most dangerous river in Iceland.

Organised rafting excursions take place on parts of the river. The river is bridged at four locations, thrice at the lowland and once near the source in the highland where it is only open over the summer.

== See also ==
- List of rivers of Iceland
