= Hvítárvatn =

Lake in the Highlands of Iceland

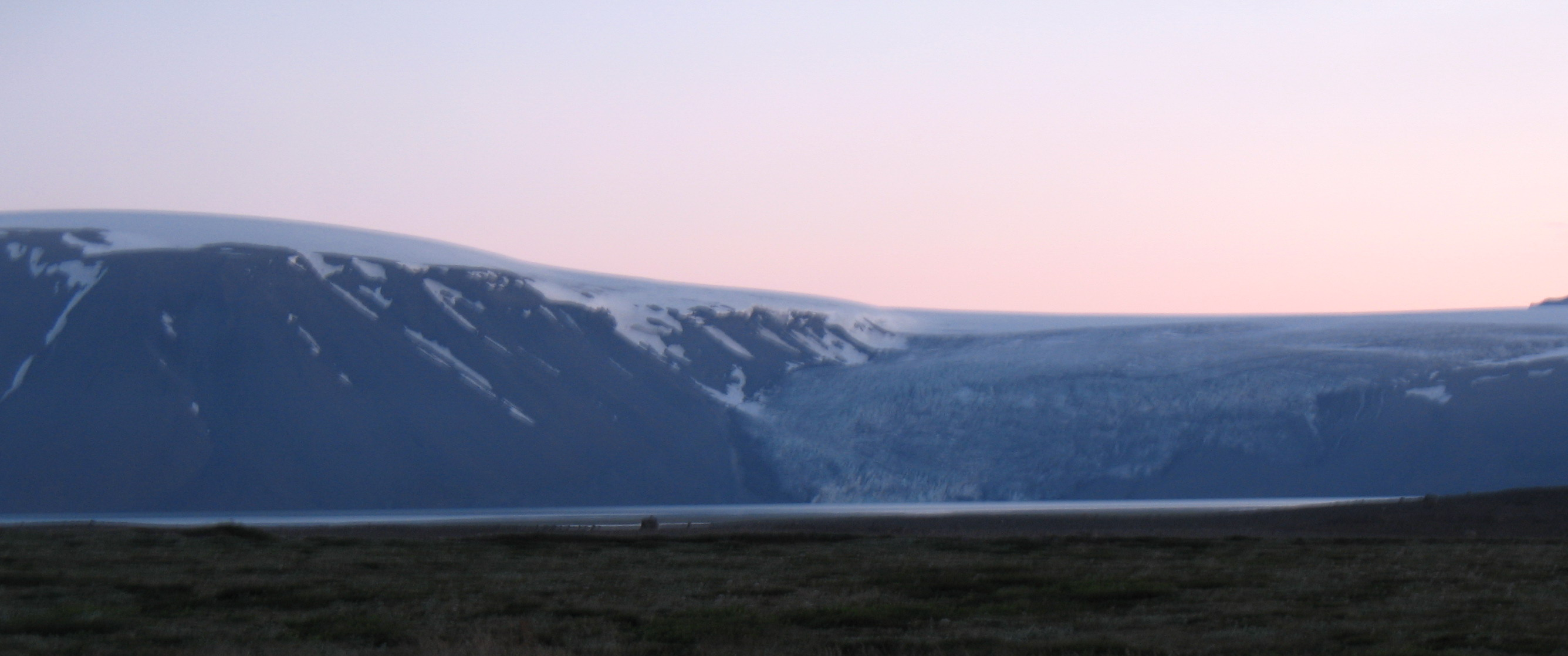

- Location within Iceland
- Coordinates: 64°37′N 19°50′W
- Primary outflows: Hvítá
- Basin countries: Iceland
- Surface area: 30 km^{2} (12 sq mi)
- Max. depth: 84 m (276 ft)
- Surface elevation: 420 m (1,380 ft)

Hvítárvatn (Icelandic pronunciation: [ˈkʰviːtˌaurˌvahtn̥], "white river lake"; also known as Hvítárlón [ˈkʰviːtˌaurˌlouːn], "white river lagoon") is a lake in the Highlands of Iceland and the source of the glacial river Hvítá, Árnessýsla. It is located 45 kilometres (28 mi) northeast of Gullfoss waterfall. Its surface is about 30 square kilometres (12 sq mi) and its greatest depth is 84 metres (276 ft). It lies at an elevation of 420 metres (1,380 ft).

There are some rivers and lakes with the Icelandic adjective hvítur (white) in their name. This is explained by the source of most of Iceland's freshwater, which originates from glaciers which make the water light in colour.

== See also ==
- List of lakes of Iceland
- Geography of Iceland
