= Sigríður Tómasdóttir =

Icelandic Environmentalist

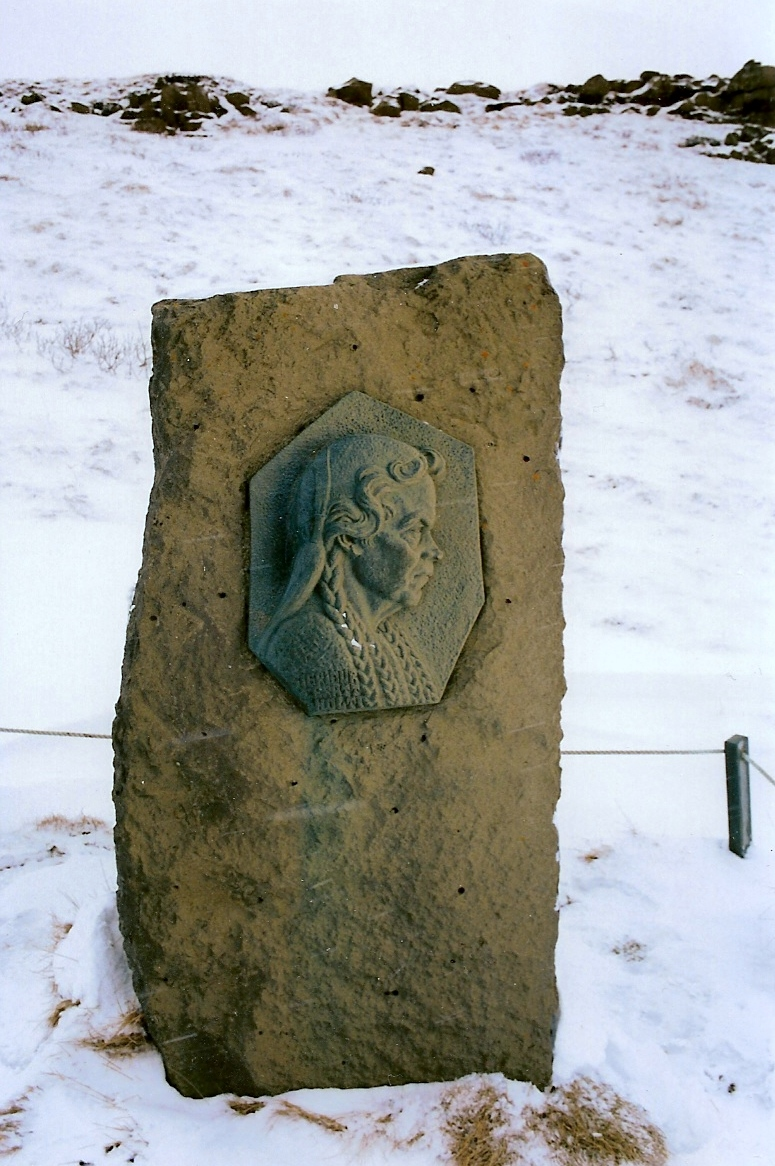
- Born: 1871; Iceland
- Died: 1957 (aged 82–83)
- Known for: Environmentalist, Gullfoss

Sigríður Tómasdóttir (1871–1957) was an Icelandic environmentalist whose activism helped preserve Gullfoss waterfalls, protecting it from industrialization. She is widely seen as Iceland's first environmentalist and is memorialized on a sculpture near Gullfoss.

== Early life ==
Sigríður was born in Brattholt in 1871 and grew up on her family's sheep farm. She did not receive any official education but was well read and artistic. She and her sisters would act as guides for visitors of the waterfalls.

== Activism ==
In 1907, landowners including Sigríður's father, Tómas Tómasson, signed a deal to allow the construction of a hydroelectric dam across the Hvítá River that would result in the submergence of Gullfoss. Upset by the deal, she took legal action against the development and staged several protests. She made numerous treks of 120 kilometers to Reykjavík, by some accounts on foot, to meet with government officials and later threatened to throw herself in the waterfalls.

She was represented legally by Sveinn Björnsson, who later became Iceland's first president. Sigríður's efforts ultimately failed with the legal system but gained positive public attention. The lease contracts later were canceled and the hydroelectric project was never constructed. Gullfoss and the surrounding area was eventually sold to the Icelandic government and was made a permanent conservation site in 1979.

== Legacy ==
Sigríður died in 1957 and was buried in the Haukadalur cemetery. The sculptor Ríkarður Jónsson made a memorial to Tómasdóttir that stands near Gulfoss.
