= Brúará =

River of Iceland

Coordinates: 64°04′34″N 20°36′00″W

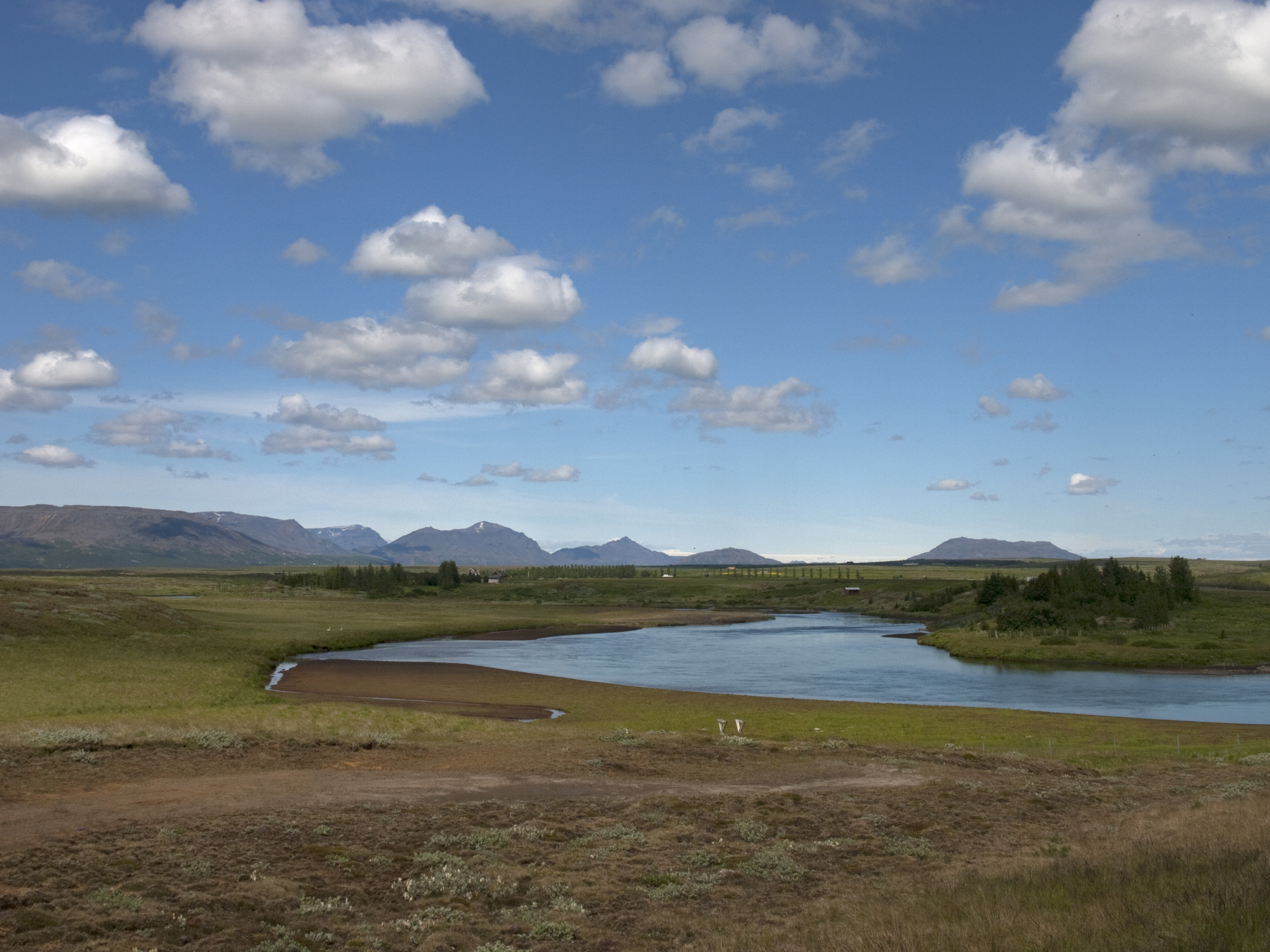
The lower course of the Brúará

The Brúará (Icelandic pronunciation: [ˈpruːarˌauː], "bridge river") is a river of Iceland. It is fed by springs and discharges at the Rótarsandur area and the Brúará Canyons. It is a right tributary of the Hvítá. The whole river course is designated as a nature protected area. The name comes from a type of natural bridge that overpassed the river near the bishop-seat in Skalholt. According to sources from the bishop a worker of the bishop broke the bridge in 1602 because the seat didn't want dirty wanderers to have it to easy to approach.
