= Þórisjökull =

Glacier in Iceland

- Þórisjökull
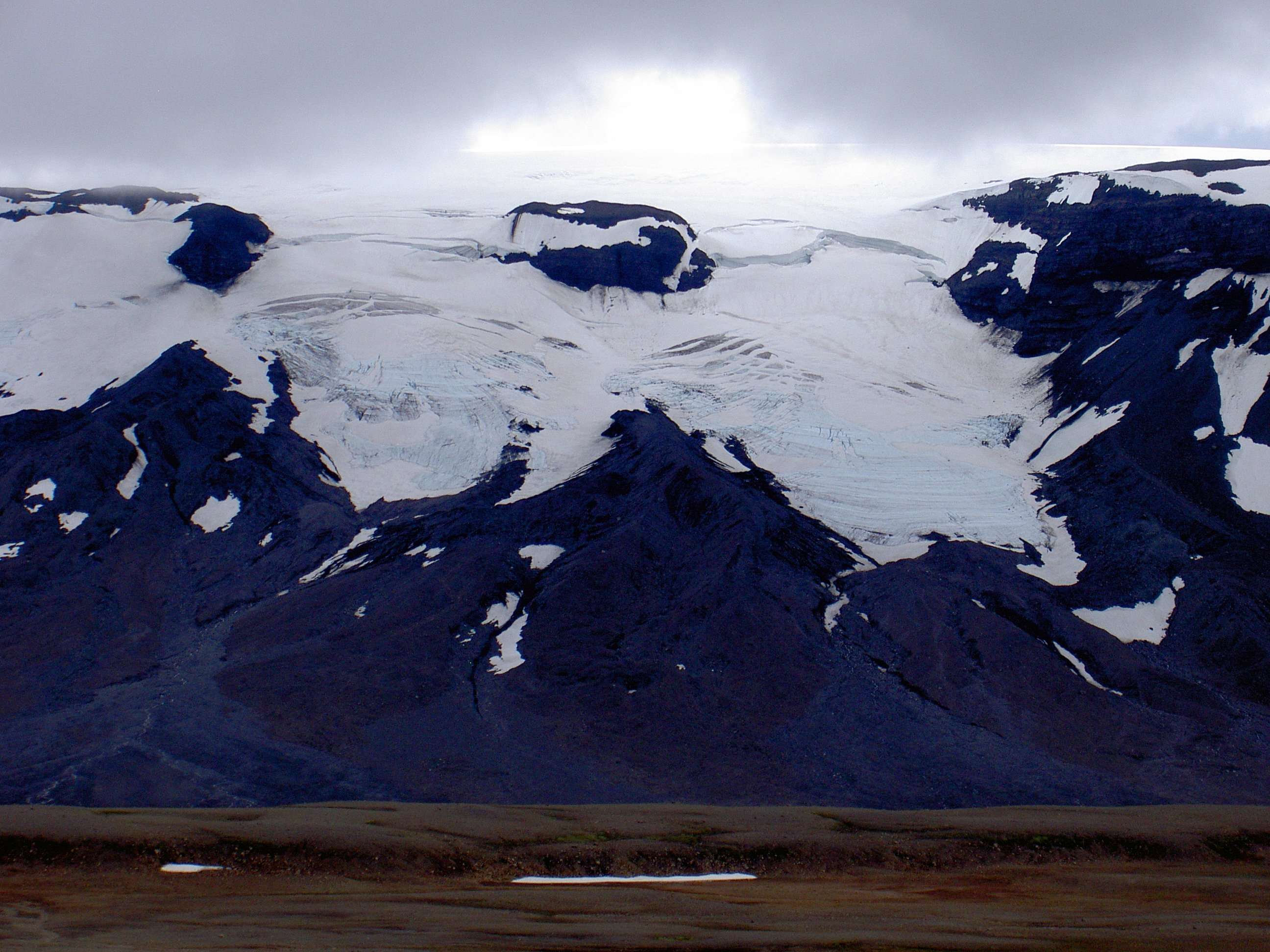
- Þórisjökull
- Map centred on Þórisjökull ice cap with Langjökull to its north showing named glacial catchments (light grey shading). Clicking on the map rectangle to enlarge it, enables mouse over that allows identification of individual named glacial catchments in Iceland. The volcano symbols in brown are the location of the hyaloclastite volcanoes Litla‐Björnsfell and Stóra‐Björnsfell.
- Location: Iceland
- Coordinates: 64°32′31″N 20°42′56″W

Þórisjökull or Thórisjökull (Icelandic pronunciation: [ˈθouːrɪsˌjœːkʏtl̥], Icelandic for "Thóris's glacier") is a small glacier and volcano in western-central Iceland, to the southwest of Langjökull glacier. It has an elevation of 1,350 metres (4,430 ft). Kaldidalur lies in the foreground.

== Geography ==
Þórisjökull is situated between Langjökull glacier and the shield volcano Ok to its east. The "Cold valley" (translation of Kaldidalur) is between them with its highland road of the same name.

== Geology ==
The glacier volcano Þórisjökull is a tuya from the Ice Age (in Iceland from 100,000 years ago until about 10,000 years ago). Its mountain part consists mainly of hyaloclastites. The glacier was part of Langjökull glacier probably until the end of the 18th century.

Some geological research was done in the Þórisjökull and Prestahnúkur area in 2009 and it showed active volcanic fissures under the glacier which are part of the Prestahnúkur volcanic system.. The area south of Þórisjökull has been studied in some geological detail in the context of obtaining greater understanding of the geology of Mars. This includes the Stóra‐Björnsfell and Litla‐Björnsfell volcanoes nearby that formed under icecaps so presumably have similar geology and the Skjaldbreiður shield volcano further to the south.

== The name ==
The name comes from the name of the troll Þórir (from Grettis Saga) which is said to have been lived in a cave nearby.

== Mountaineering ==
It is possible to hike up on the glacier from the highest point of Kaldidalur-Road near the big cairn Beinakerlingin in a height of 720 m (2,360 ft).

== Gallery ==
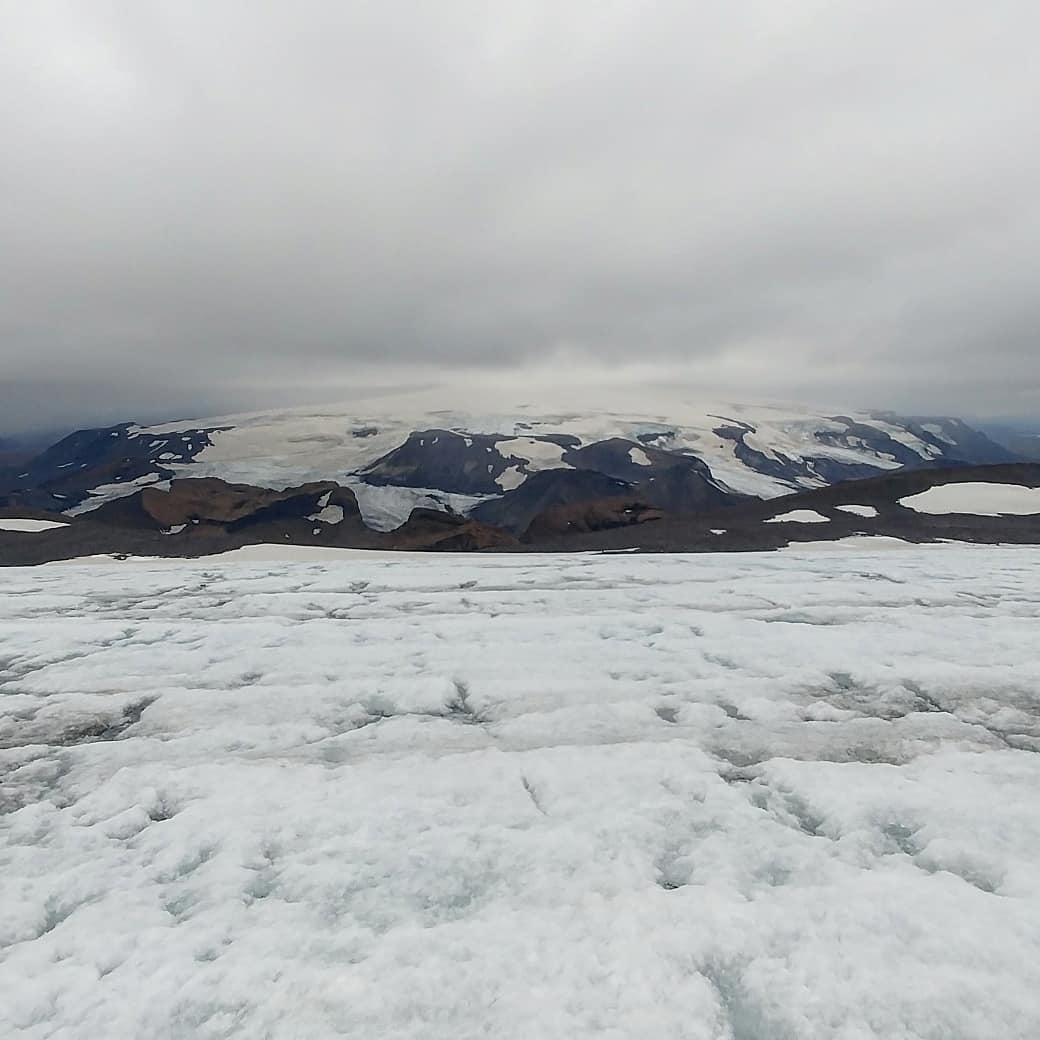
Þórisjökull viewed from adjacent Geitlandsjökull to the north.

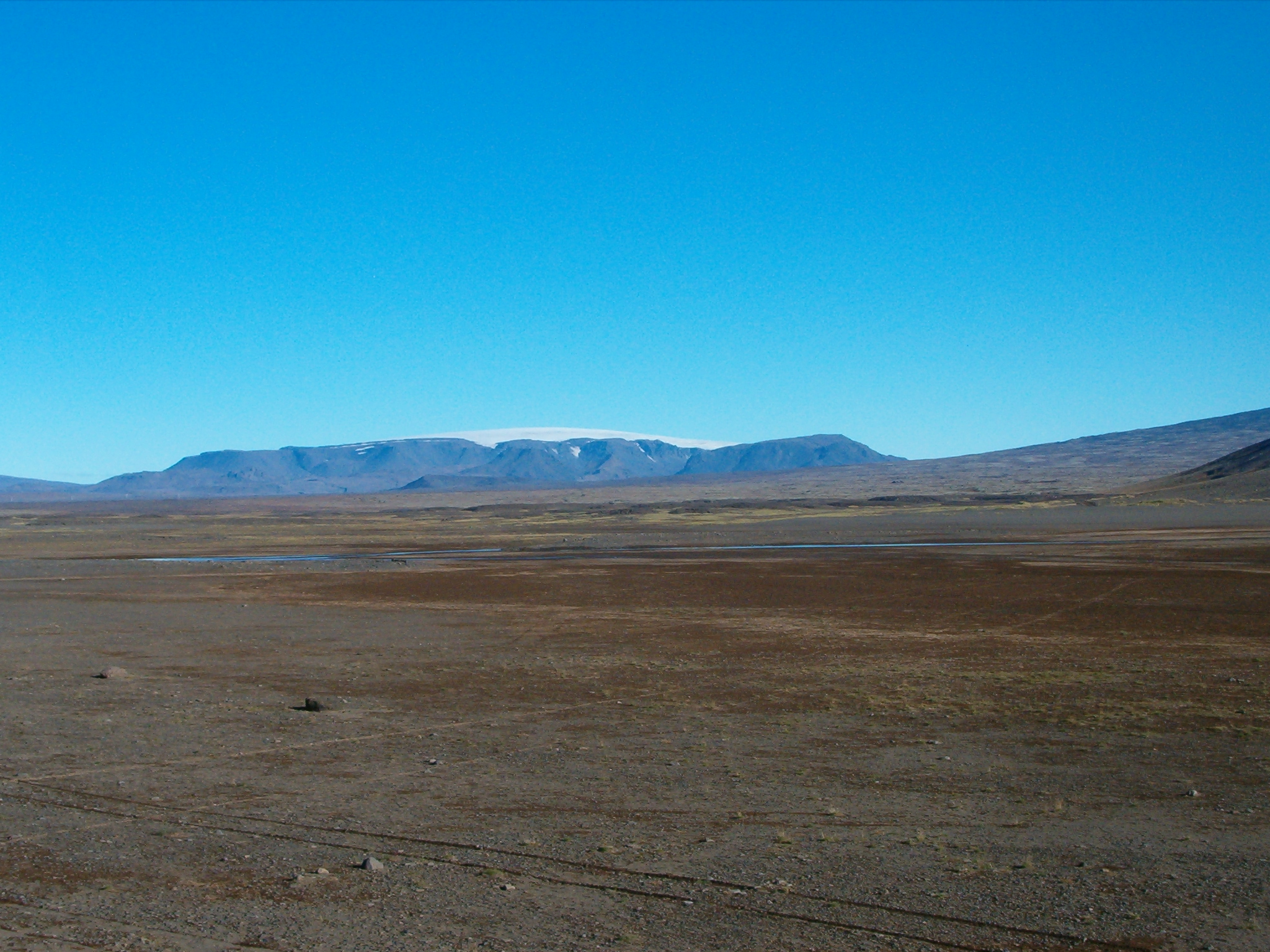
Þórisjökull viewed from road no. 52.
