= Þrándarjökull =

Small glacier in eastern Iceland

Coordinates: 64°41′52″N 14°54′40″W

Map showing approximate area of Þrándarjökull glacier. To its south-west is a glacier called Hofsjökull eystri, that should not be confused with the much larger one of similar name to the west. Clicking on the map to enlarge it enables mouse over that shows all the large glacier catchments (light grey shading) in Iceland

Þrándarjökull (Icelandic pronunciation: [ˈθrauntarˌjœːkʏtl̥]) is a small glacier in eastern Iceland located 20 kilometres (12 mi) to the north east of the Vatnajökull glacier. It had a past measured elevation of 1,248 m (4,094 ft), but the glacier is presently between 950 m (3,120 ft) and 1,200 m (3,900 ft) above sea level. Between 1890 which is the Little Ice Age maximum in Iceland, and 2019, its area has decreased from 35 km^{2} (14 sq mi) to 14.2 km^{2} (5.5 sq mi).
