= Golden Circle (Iceland) =

Tourist route in southern Iceland

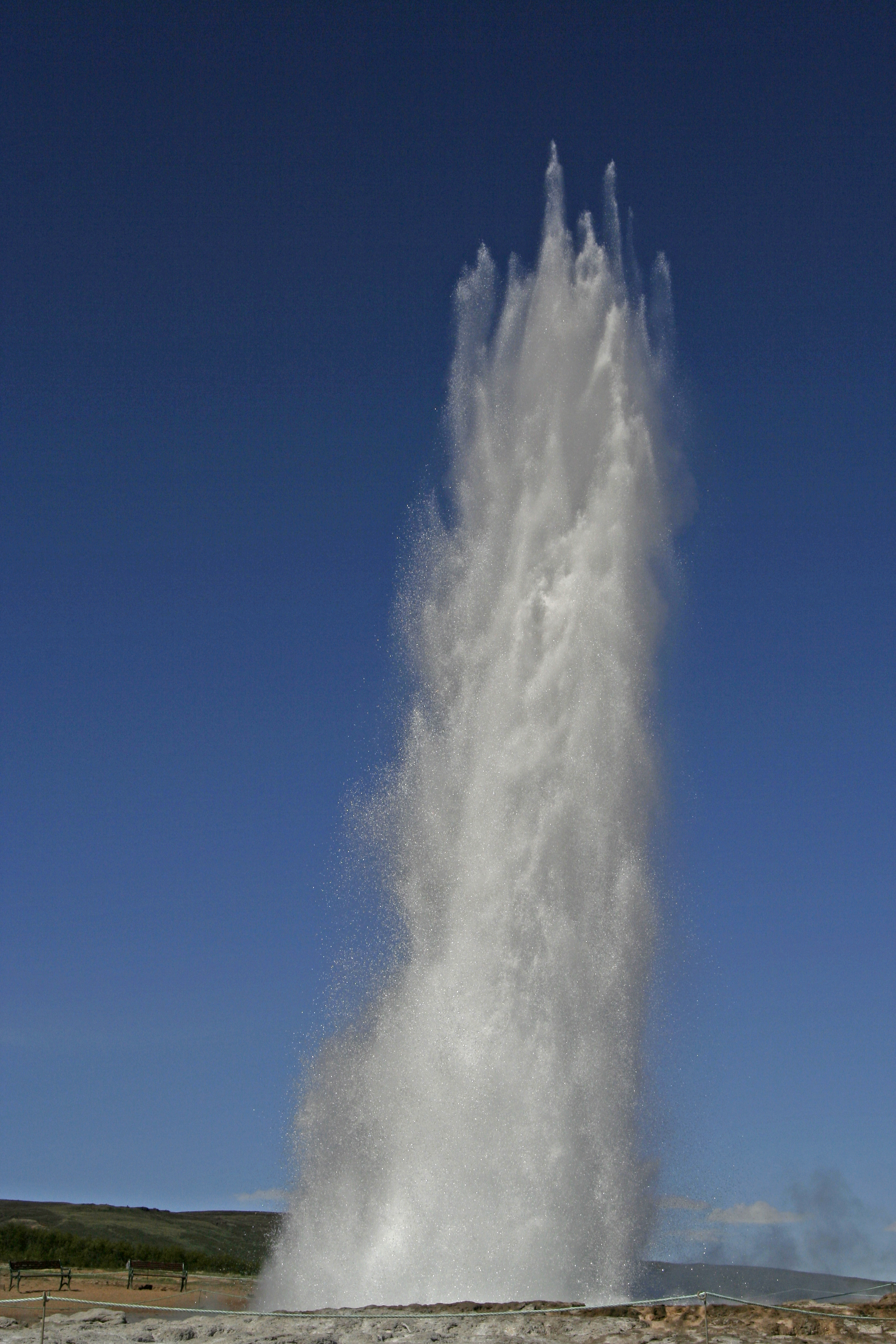
Strokkur

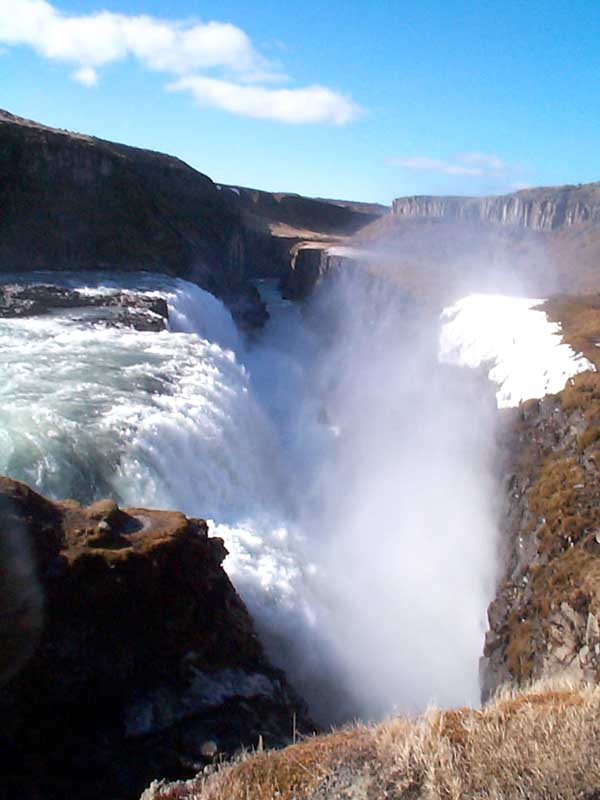
Gullfoss waterfall

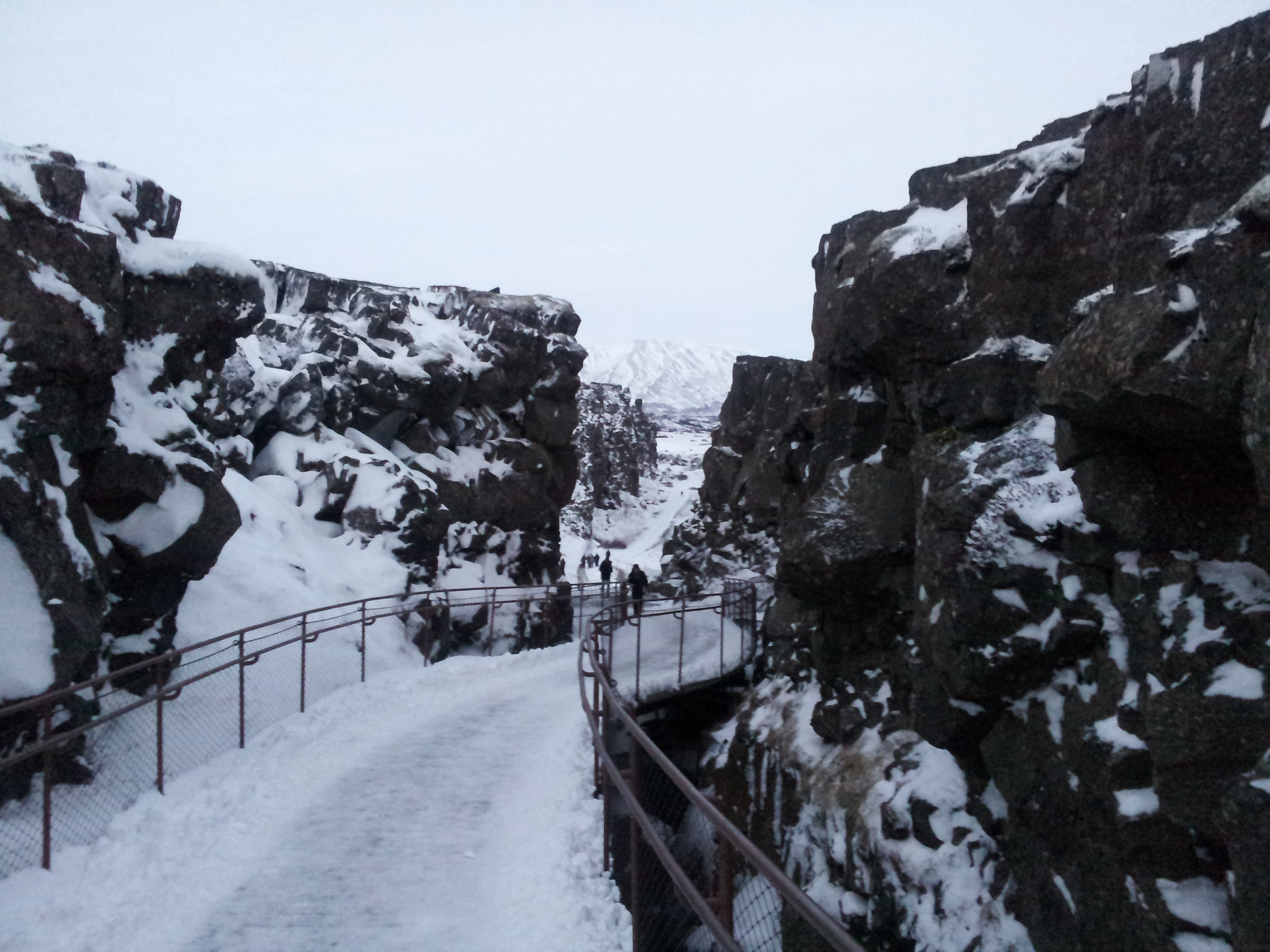
Þingvellir National Park rift valley

The Golden Circle (Icelandic: Gullni hringurinn [ˈkʏtlnɪ ˈr̥iŋkʏrɪn]) is a tourist route in southwest Iceland. It is a loop of about 300 kilometres (190 mi), from Reykjavík into the southern uplands of Iceland and back, and includes the most visited attractions in Iceland. The term was developed by the Icelandic Tourism board, to promote travel to the country.

The three primary stops on the route are Þingvellir National Park, Gullfoss waterfall, and the geothermal area in Haukadalur, which contains the geysers Geysir and Strokkur. Though Geysir – largest at the site, and source of the word geyser – has been mostly dormant for many years, Strokkur erupts every 5–10 minutes. Other common stops include the Kerið volcanic crater, Brúarfoss and Faxi waterfalls, the town of Hveragerði, Skálholt cathedral, and the Nesjavellir and Hellisheiðarvirkjun geothermal power plants.

== See also ==
- Diamond Circle – a tourist route in northeast Iceland
