= Eiríksjökull =

Glacier and large tuya in Iceland

Eiríksjökull (Tuya)
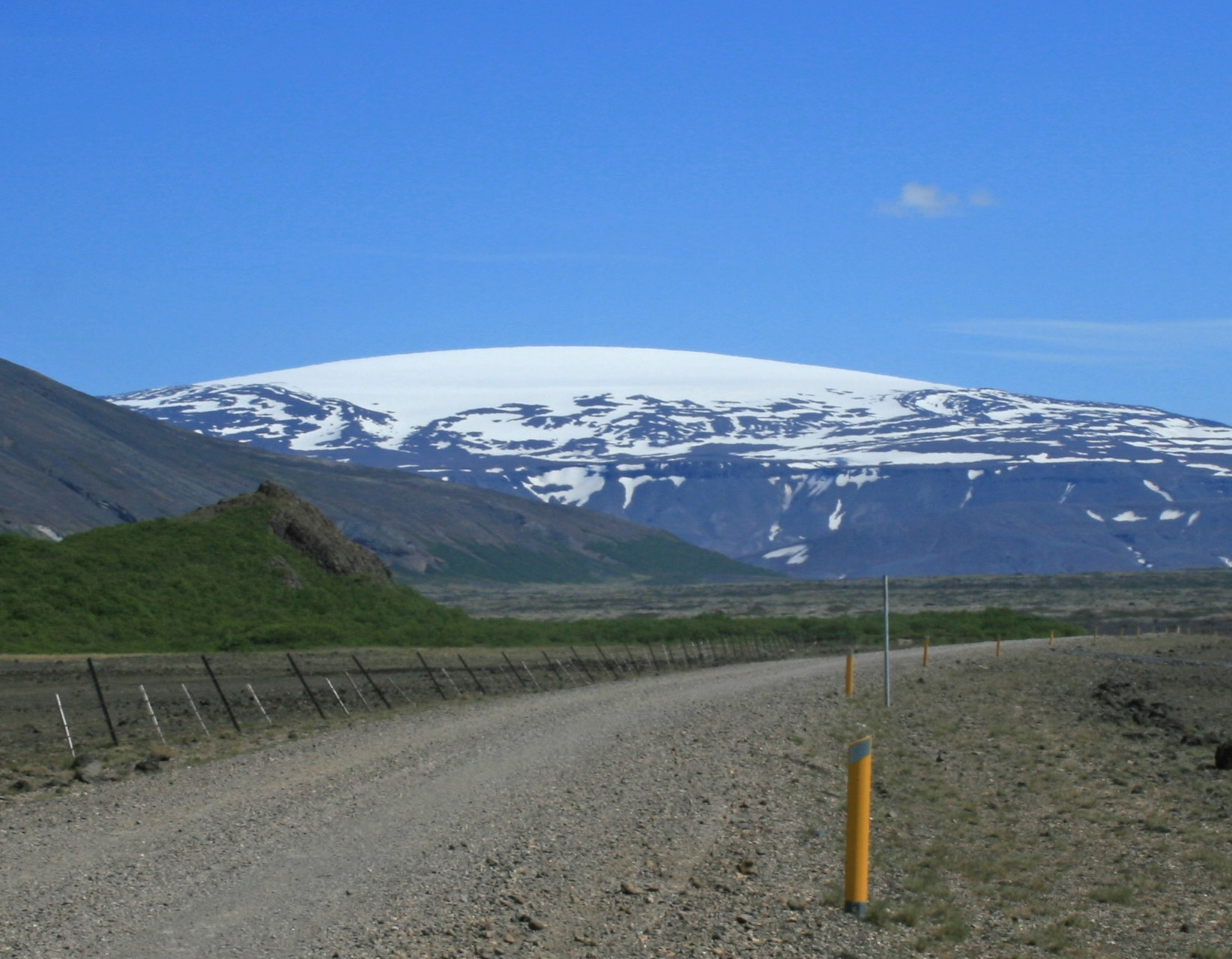
- Eiríksjökull

Highest point
- Elevation: 1,675 m (5,495 ft)
- Prominence: > 1,000 m
- Coordinates: 64°46′24″N 20°24′34″W

Dimensions
- Area: 77 km^{2} (30 sq mi)
- Volume: 48 km^{3} (12 cu mi)

Geography
- Location within Iceland
- Location: Iceland

Geology
- Mountain type(s): Tuya, shield volcano, composite volcano
- Last eruption: Pleistocene

Eiríksjökull (Icelandic for "Eirík's glacier", Icelandic pronunciation: [ˈeiːriksˌjœːkʏtl̥]) is a glacier north-west of Langjökull in Iceland, with an area of 22 km^{2} (8.5 sq mi) reaching a height of 1,675 m (5,495 ft), atop the largest table mountain in Iceland which goes by the same name.

== Geology ==
This volcano which is about three times the area of its capping glacier is in the Western volcanic zone. It rises over 1,000 m (3,300 ft) above its surrounds and was formed presumably by mongenetic subglacial volcanic activity. It is currently dormant or more likely extinct in terms of volcanic activity. The lowest 350 m (1,150 ft) is a hyaloclastite (móberg) tuya, capped by a 750 m (2,460 ft) thick basaltic lava shield. The volcano is also a composite volcano.

== Glacier ==
There is an accessible ice-cored moraine beyond the north-east tuya plateau edge Klofajökull outlet glacier, but the other outlet glaciers are less accessible. These are the Brækureystri to the north, Vestri-Brækur to the north-west, Þorvaldsjökull to the east and Ögmundarjökull (this is just south of the Þorvaldsjökull glacier and has been regarded as part of Þorvaldsjökull) In 2008 the ice field edge was at about the 1,300 m (4,300 ft) contour.

== Etymology ==
The glacier was called Baldjökull until about 1700 and with relative certainty the current name is influenced by the nearby mountain Eiríksgnípa. Nothing is known with certainty about said Erik but a fable tells of an outlaw named Eiríkur or Eirekur who evaded capture by running into that mountain.
