= Kaldadalsvegur =

Street in Iceland

Coordinates: 64.5667°N 20.7667°W

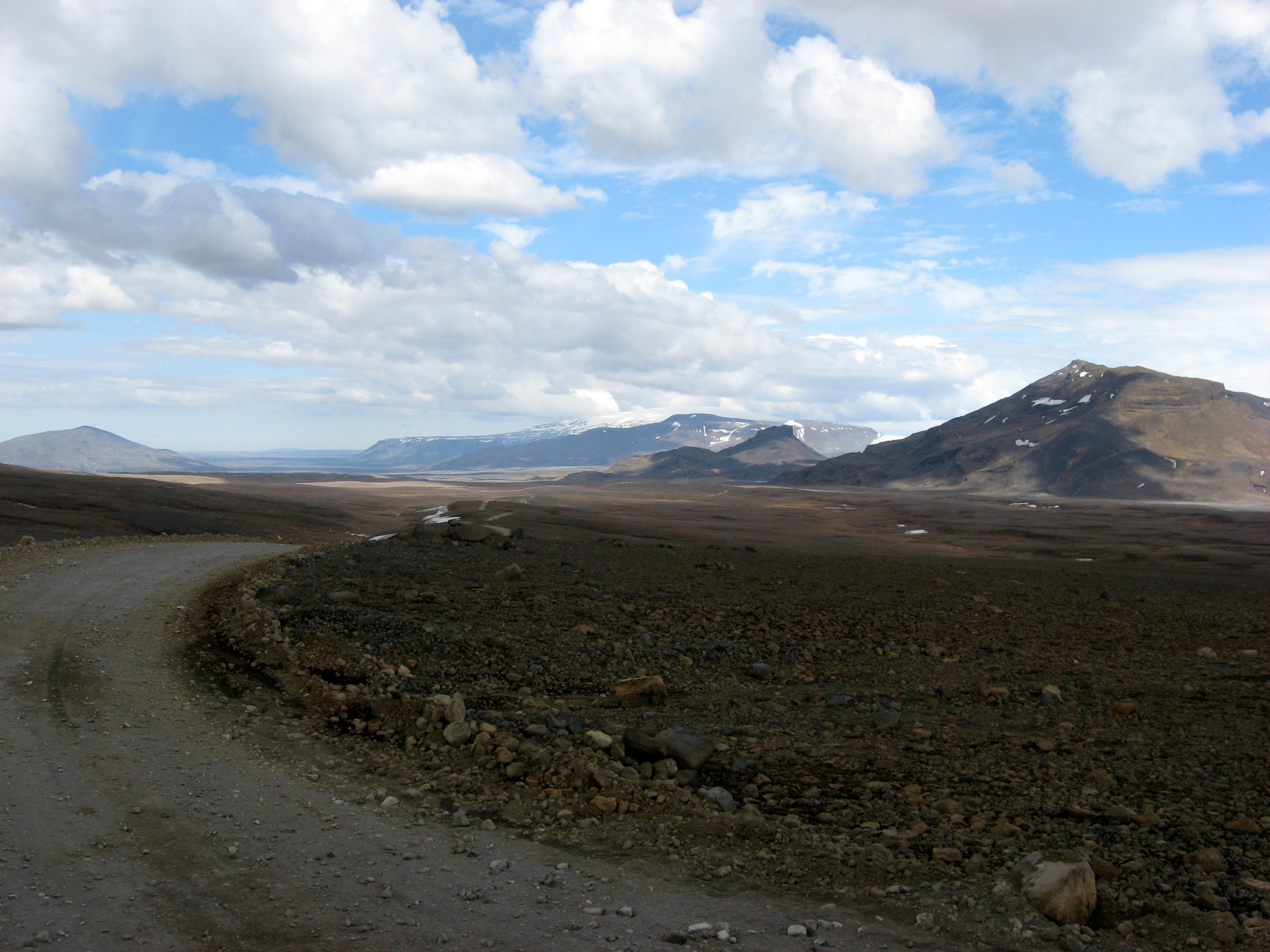
Kaldidalur Highland road

The Kaldadalsvegur (Icelandic pronunciation: [ˈkʰaltaˌtalsˌvɛːɣʏr̥], lit. 'Kaldidalur Road') is the shortest of the highland tracks traversing the Highlands of Iceland, therefore the nickname "highlands for beginners". Its name derives from the valley it crosses: Kaldidalur [ˈkʰaltɪˌtaːlʏr̥] means "cold dale/valley". Sometimes the Kaldadalsvegur is referred to as simply "the Kaldidalur".

The route begins a bit to the north of Þingvellir and to the west of the volcano Skjaldbreiður, which really comes up to its name (meaning broad shield). The track continues between the glaciers Þórisjökull and Ok and leads up to the north. To the east of Reykholt it comes near the Reykholtsdalur to Húsafell. Then it continues up to Hvammstangi at the Miðfjörður.

Signed as route 550 (formerly F550), the track is 40 kilometers long, and has no unbridged river crossings. (The Kaldadalsvegur is not an F road, and a four-wheel-drive vehicle is not legally required to traverse it, however many car rental companies forbid the use of their two-wheel-drive vehicles on this interior route.)

The other well known highland routes are Kjölur and Sprengisandur.
