= Highlands of Iceland =

Geographical area of Iceland

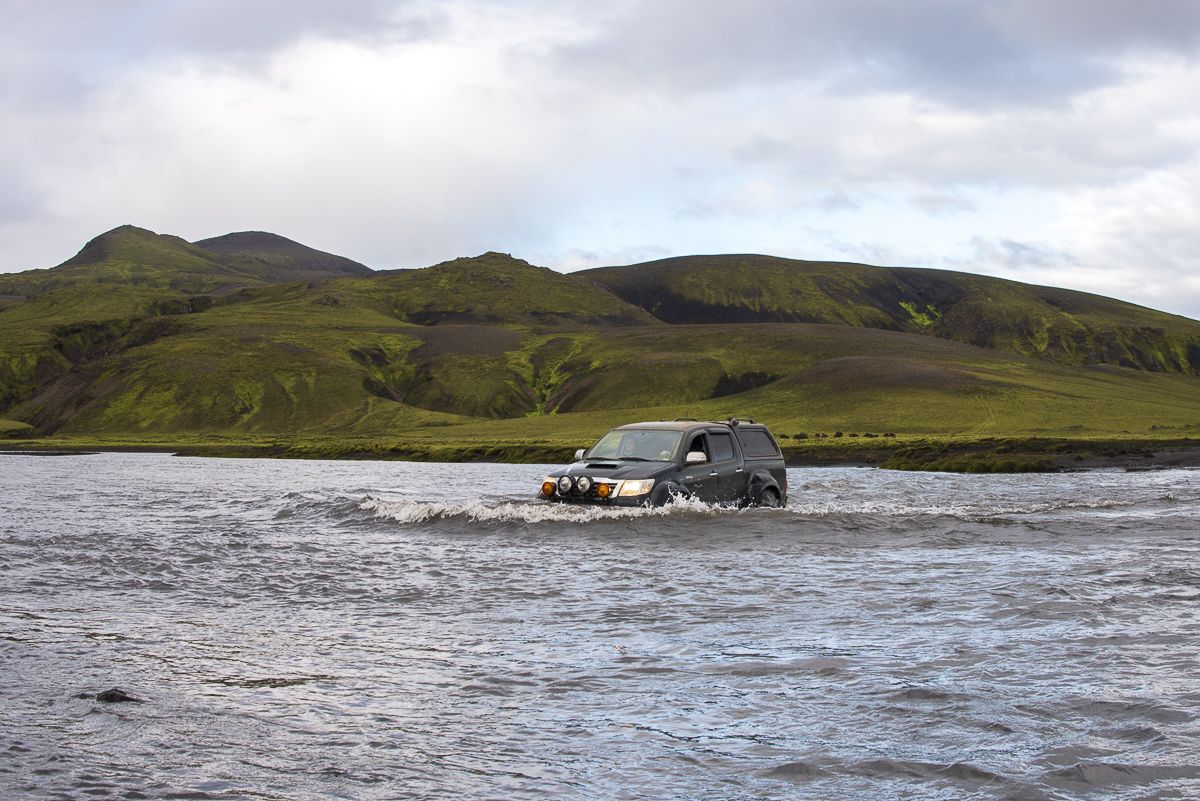
Crossing a river in the Icelandic Highland

Icelandic Highland

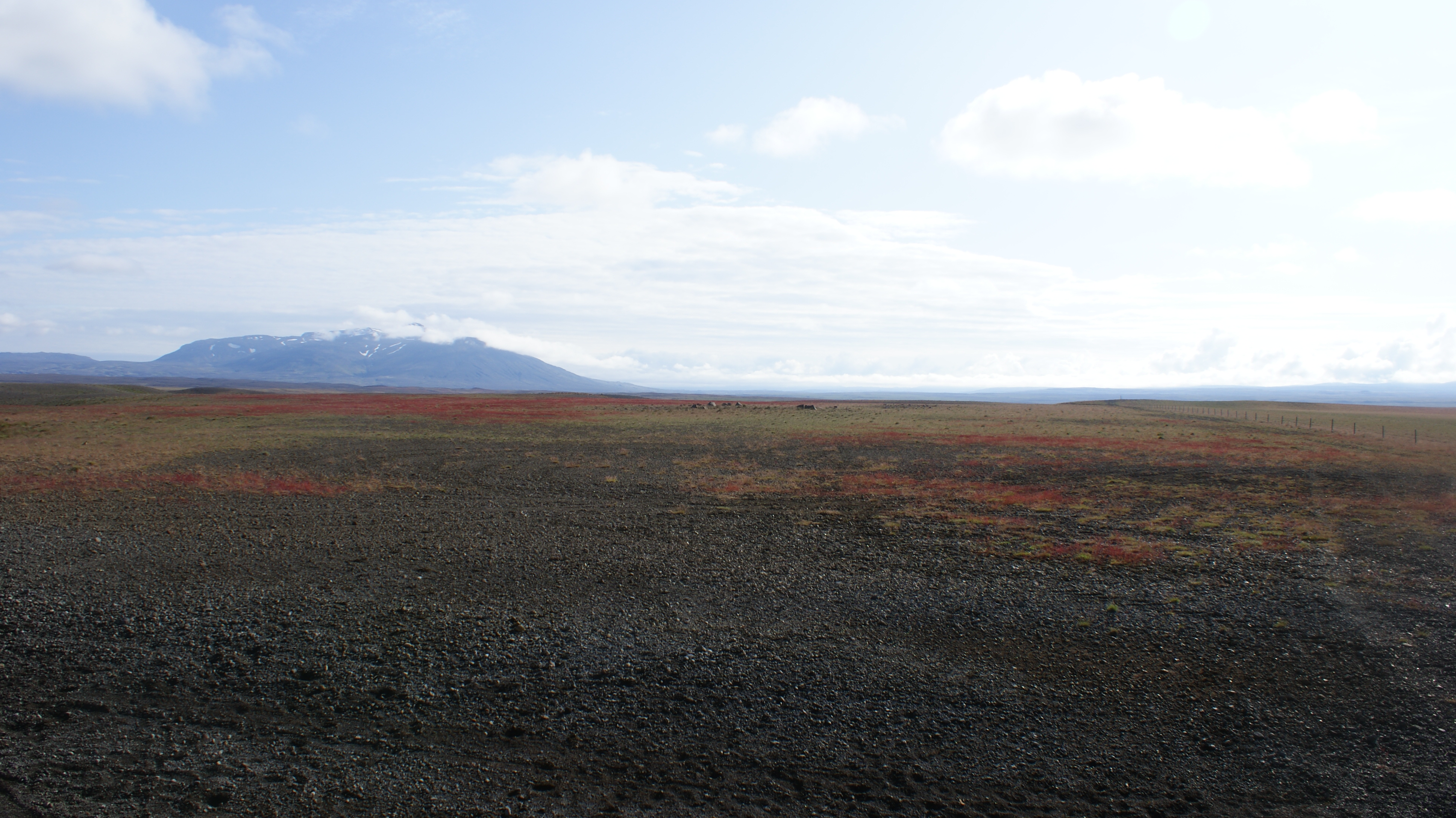
Desert dominates the central Highland, through which the Kjölur road winds its way

The Highland (Icelandic: hálendið), also known as the Central Highland (Icelandic: miðhálendið), is an area that comprises much of the interior land of Iceland. The Highland is situated above 300–400 meters (980–1,310 ft) and is mostly uninhabitable. The soil is primarily volcanic ash, and the terrain consists of basalt mountains and lava fields. Snow covers the Highland from October until the beginning of June. A few oasis-like areas, such as Herðubreiðarlindir and Þórsmörk, are also found in the Highland. The area has many notable natural features and hiking trails.

== Natural features in the Highland ==
The Highland encompasses various geological features, including Landmannalaugar, Torfajökull, Eldgjá, Þórsmörk, Herðubreið, Askja, Hveradalir, Lakagígar, and the Fagrifoss waterfall. Sites in the Highland are difficult to access and may be accessible only during the summer months. Most sites require all-wheel drive or all-terrain vehicles for access due to the unpaved dirt roads.

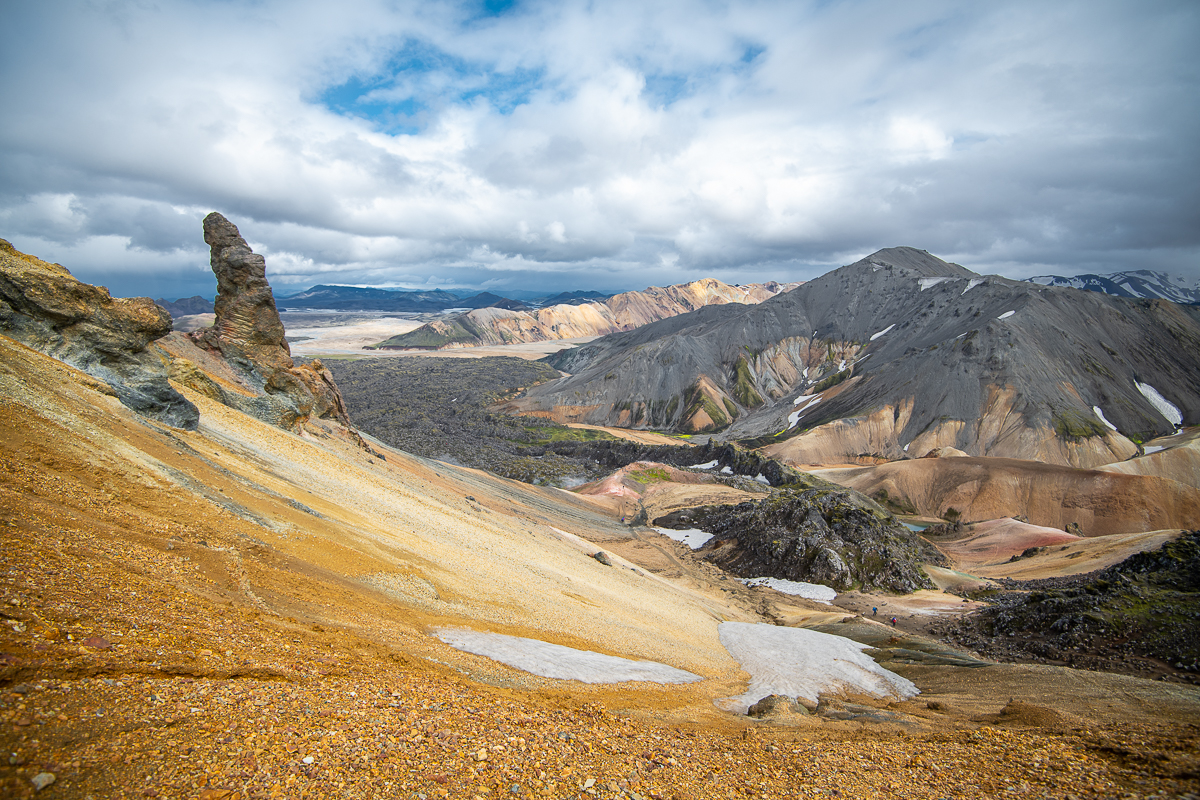
Landmannalaugar provides some of the most interesting vista points to visit in the Icelandic Highland, for instance this point located at the northwest part of the colorful caldera Torfajökull, showing characteristic rhyolite lava fields and mountains

== Glaciers and volcanoes in the Highland ==
The largest glaciers in the Highland are Vatnajökull, Langjökull, Eyjafjallajökull, Mýrdalsjökull, and Hofsjökull, with multiple outlet glaciers. Many glaciers occur atop volcanoes, some of which erupt regularly, such as the Bárðabunga volcano. The most famous of these volcanoes in recent times is Eyjafjallajökull, which erupted in 2010. In the sandy Highland, vegetation is found only at the edges of glaciers and near rivers and streams. There is a pervasive danger of glacial outburst floods, or "glacier runs," at times of eruptions and volcanic activity. The radiating heat causes the underside of glaciers to melt, creating large pockets of water that accumulate until they burst. This phenomenon is unique to Iceland and is internationally known by the Icelandic term jökulhlaup.

== Recreation in the Highland ==
There are several hiking trails in the Highland. A popular route is the 54 km Laugavegur hiking trail from Landmannalaugar to Þórsmörk. Other notable hikes are Fimmvörðuháls and old Kjalvegur.

== Highland roads or F-Roads ==
The Highland can be crossed only during the Icelandic summer. For the rest of the year, Highland roads are closed. Driving off-road is forbidden, to protect both drivers and environmental features.

The best-known Highland roads are Kaldidalur, Kjölur, Kjalvegur, Fjallabak syðri, Fjallabak nyrðri, Lakavegur, Kverkfjöll, and Sprengisandur. Most Highland roads require four-wheel drive vehicles, which also assist in crossing rivers. However, the Kjölur route can be traversed easily in an ordinary car and is therefore one of the more popular Highland roads.

== See also ==
- Volcanism of Iceland
- Vatnajökull National Park
- Information about the Highland in Iceland
