= Gullfoss =

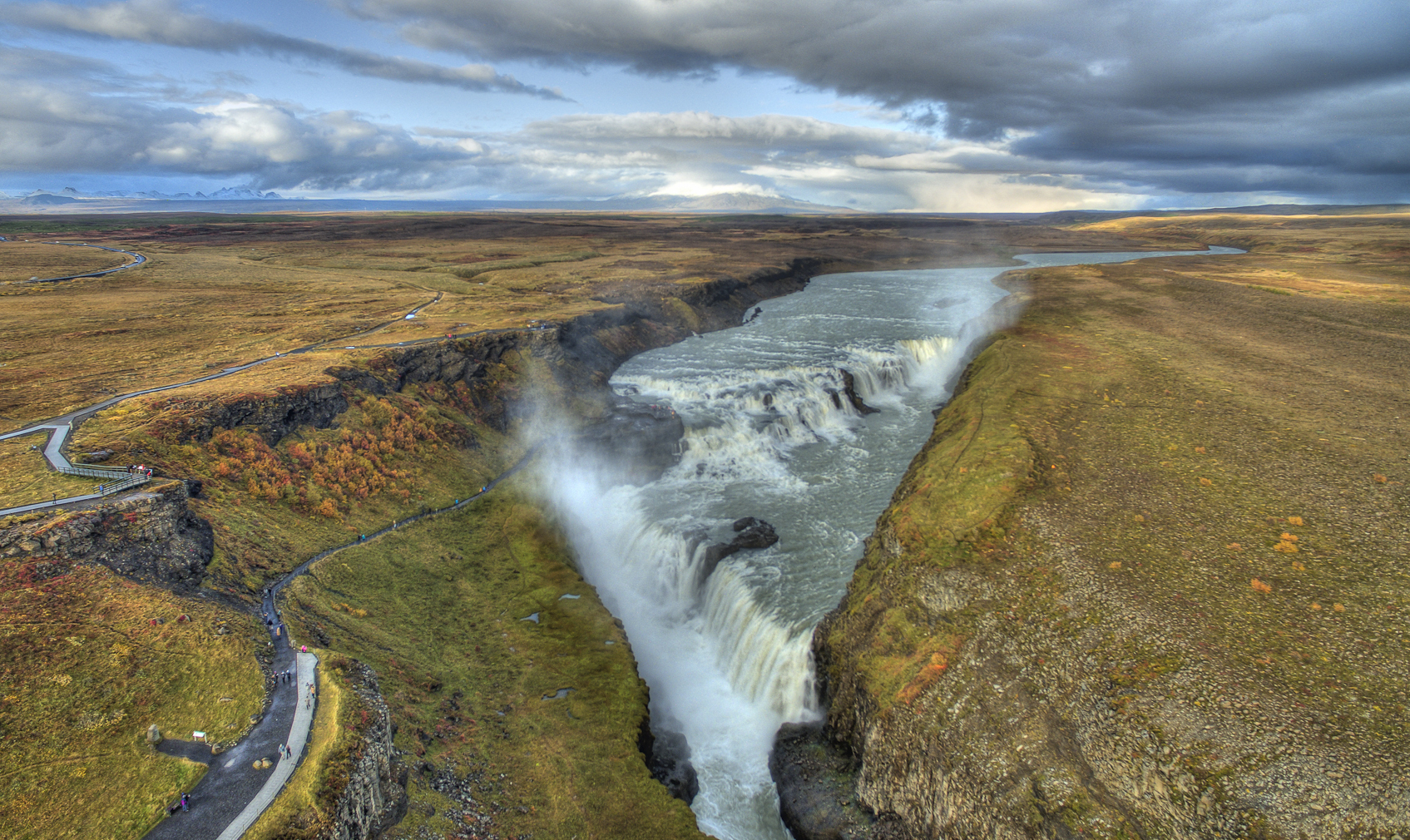
- Gullfoss, Iceland

- Location within Iceland
- Location: Bláskógabyggð and Hrunamannahreppur, Iceland
- Coordinates: 64°19′34″N 20°07′16″W
- Type: Tiered, Cataract
- Total height: 32 m (105 ft)
- Number of drops: 2
- Longest drop: 21 m (69 ft)
- Watercourse: Hvítá River
- Average flow rate: 140 m^{3}/s

Gullfoss ("Golden Falls"; Icelandic pronunciation: [ˈkʏtl̥ˌfɔsː]) is a waterfall located in the canyon of the Hvítá river in southwest Iceland, between the municipalities of Bláskógabyggð and Hrunamannahreppur. It is one of the most popular tourist attractions in the country, and is included in "Golden Circle" tours of the countryside near Reykjavík.

== History and description ==
Gullfoss in August 2013

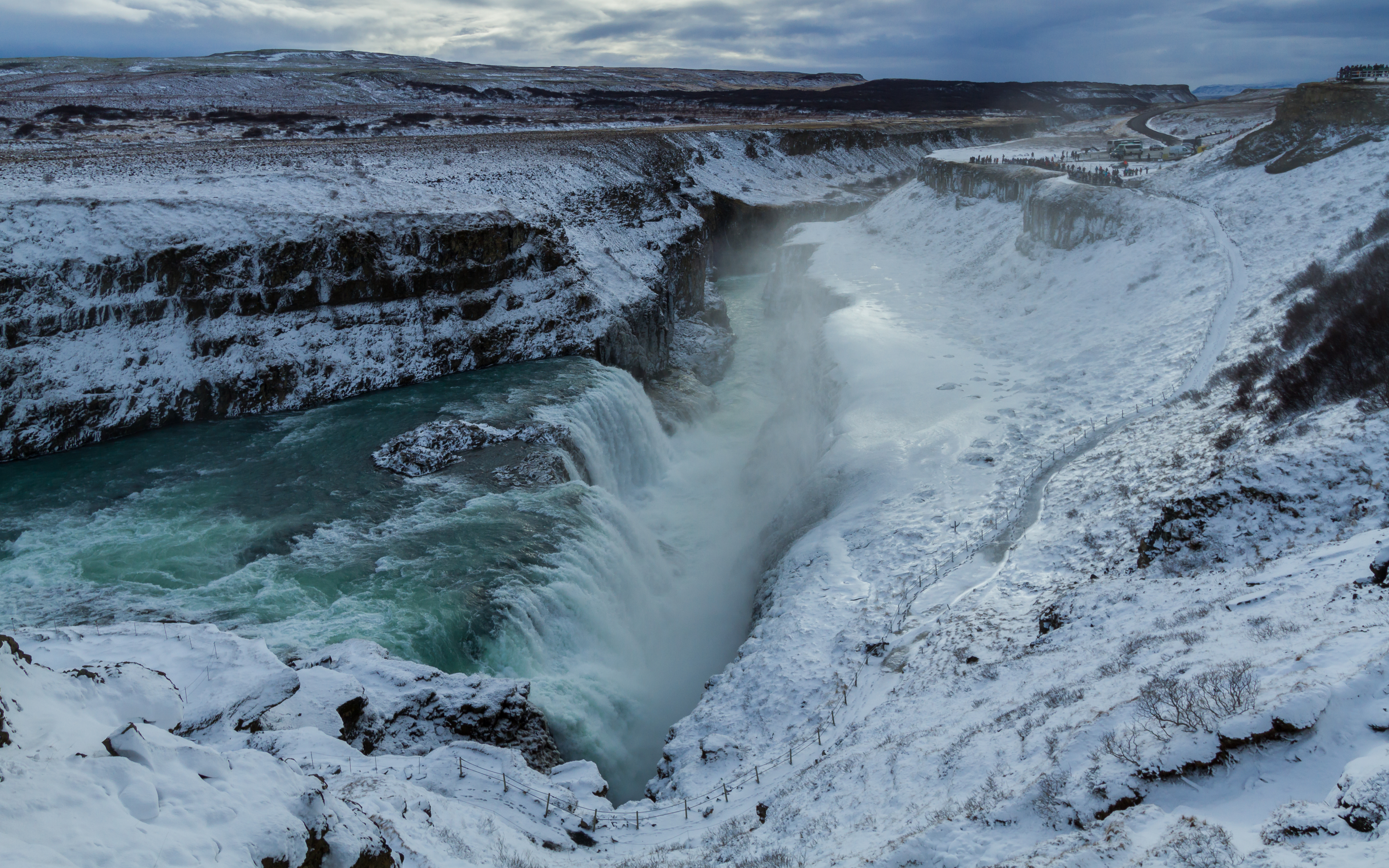
The falls in winter

The Hvítá river flows southward, and about a kilometre above the falls it turns sharply to the west and flows down into a wide curved three-step "staircase" and then abruptly plunges in two stages (11 metres or 36 feet, and 21 metres or 69 feet) into a crevice 32 metres (105 ft) deep. The crevice, about 20 metres (66 ft) wide and 2.5 kilometres (1.6 mi) in length, extends perpendicular to the flow of the river. The average amount of water running down the waterfall is 141 cubic metres (5,000 cu ft) per second in the summer and 80 cubic metres (2,800 cu ft) per second in the winter. The highest flood measured was 2,000 cubic metres (71,000 cu ft) per second.

During the first half of the 20th century and some years into the late 20th century, there was much speculation about using Gullfoss to generate electricity. During this period, the waterfall was rented indirectly by its owners, Tómas Tómasson and Halldór Halldórsson, to foreign investors. However, the investors' attempts were unsuccessful, partly due to lack of money. Sigríður Tómasdóttir, daughter of the co-owner, is popularly credited with saving the waterfall from exploitation: advocating for legal protections against foreign control of it, and reportedly threatening to throw herself down the falls. A stone memorial above the falls depicts her profile. The waterfall was later sold to the Icelandic government and was made a permanent conservation site in 1979.

Gullfoss is one of the most popular tourist attractions in Iceland. Together with Þingvellir, Geysir, and the other geysers of Haukadalur, Gullfoss forms part of the Golden Circle, a popular day excursion for tourists in Iceland.

== In popular culture ==
A photograph taken at Gullfoss in winter is the album cover of Porcupine by the British band Echo and the Bunnymen. Gullfoss is the setting of the music video for the 2003 single "Heaven" by the band Live. An animated version of the site appears in the third season of the TV series Avatar: The Last Airbender. It appears briefly in a subplot of the TV series Vikings, in which one character kills herself by diving into the falls. It is featured as a "pit stop" in the thirty-fourth season of the American reality competition The Amazing Race. Gullfoss appears as a Natural Wonder in 2025's Civilization VII.

== See also ==
- List of rivers of Iceland
- List of waterfalls
- Waterfalls of Iceland
