= Geography of Iceland =

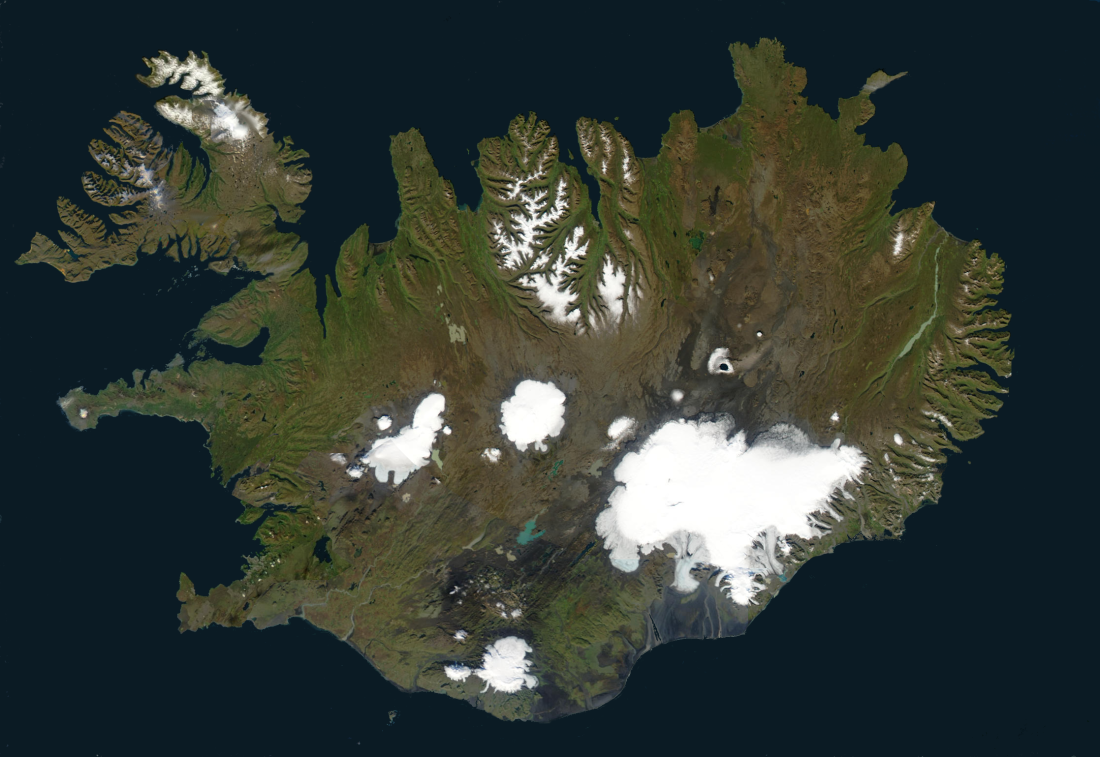
- Continent: Europe
- Region: Northern Europe
- Coordinates: 65°00′N 18°00′W
- Area: Ranked 106
  - Total: 103,001 km^{2} (39,769 sq mi)
  - Land: 97.33%
  - Water: 2.67%
- Coastline: 4,970 km (3,090 mi)
- Borders: None
- Highest point: Hvannadalshnúkur; 2,110 m (6,920 ft)
- Lowest point: Atlantic Ocean; 0 m (0 ft)
- Longest river: Þjórsá; 230 km (140 mi)
- Largest lake: Þingvallavatn; 84 km^{2} (32 mi^{2})
- Climate: Subpolar oceanic climate, Tundra
- Terrain: Plateau interspersed with mountain peaks, volcanic peaks, icefields and a coast deeply indented by bays and fjords
- Natural resources: Marine life, diatomite, hydrothermal power
- Natural hazards: Volcanism, earthquakes, avalanches, and glacial lake outburst flooding
- Environmental issues: Air pollution, climate change, desertification, hazardous wastes, marine dumping
- Exclusive economic zone: 751,345 km^{2} (290,096 mi^{2})

Iceland is an island country at the confluence of the North Atlantic and Arctic oceans, east of Greenland and immediately south of the Arctic Circle, atop the constructive boundary of the northern Mid-Atlantic Ridge. The island country is the world's 18th largest in area and one of the most sparsely populated. It is the westernmost European country when not including Greenland and has more land covered by glaciers than continental Europe. Its total size is 103,125 km^{2} (39,817 mi^{2}) and possesses an exclusive economic zone of 751,345 km^{2} (290,096 mi^{2}).

== Statistics ==
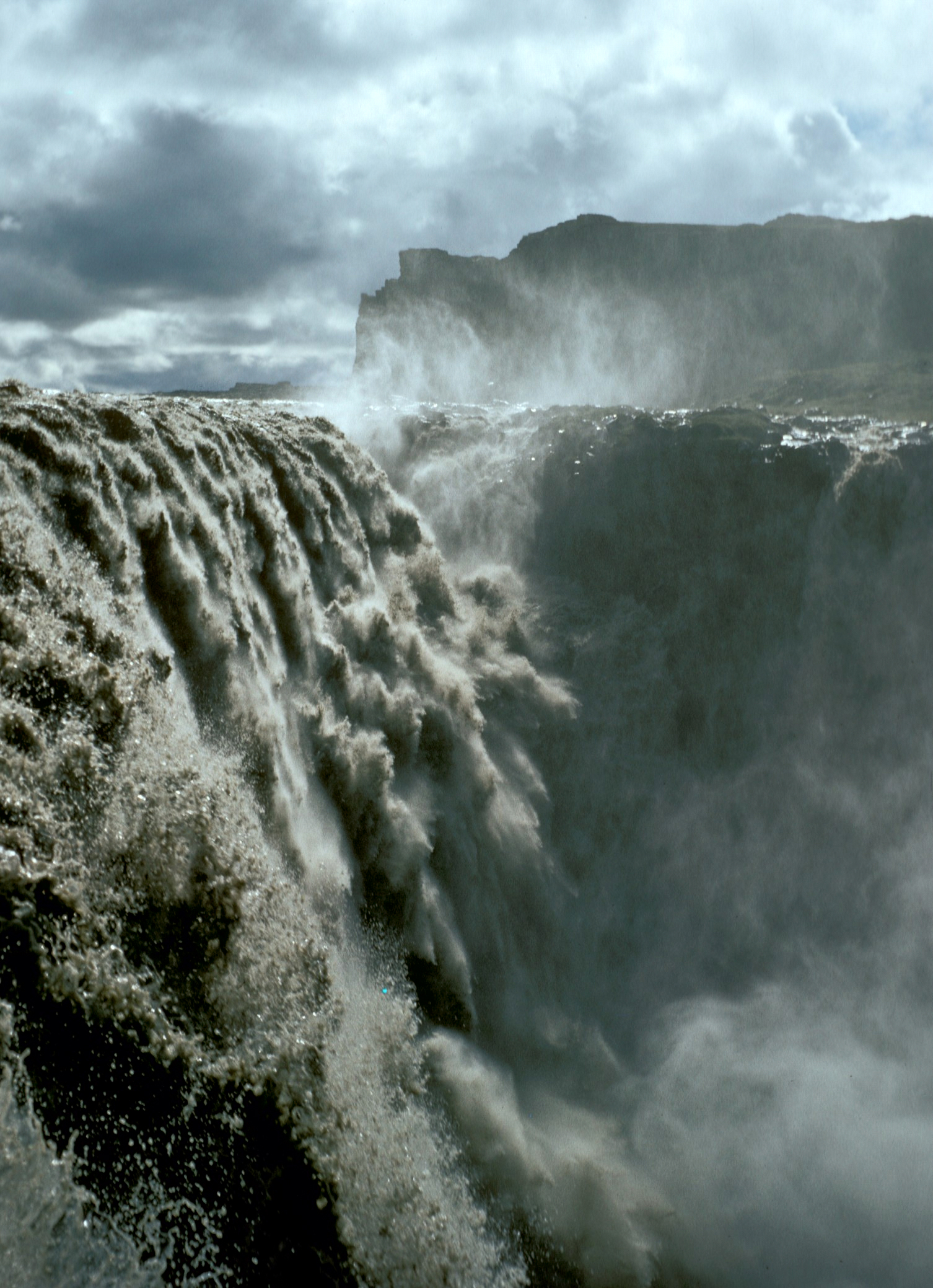
Dettifoss, located in northeast Iceland. It is the second-largest waterfall in Europe in terms of volume discharge, with an average water flow of 200 m^{3}/s.

Iceland is an island country in Northern Europe, straddling the Eurasian and North American plates between the Greenland Sea and the North Atlantic Ocean, northwest of the British Isles.

Extent (locations outside mainland in parentheses)

North: Rifstangi, 66°32′3" N (Kolbeinsey, 67°08,9 N)
South: Kötlutangi, 63°23′6" N (Surtsey, 63°17,7 N)
West: Bjargtangar, 24°32′1" W
East: Gerpir, 13°29′6" W (Hvalbakur, 13°16,6 W)

Area:

Total: 103,125 km^{2} (39,817 mi^{2})
Land: 100,329 km^{2}
Water: 2,796 km^{2}
Coastline
Iceland has a coastline of 4,970 km.

Maritime claims:

Territorial sea: 12 nmi (22.2 km; 13.8 mi)
Exclusive economic zone: 751,345 km^{2} (290,096 mi^{2}) with 200 nmi (370.4 km; 230.2 mi)
Continental shelf: 200 nmi (370.4 km; 230.2 mi) or to the edge of the continental margin

Elevation extremes:

Lowest point: Atlantic Ocean 0 m
Highest point: Hvannadalshnúkur 2,110 m

Natural resources:

Marine life, diatomite, hydropower, geothermal power

== Land use ==
Arable land: 1.21%
Permanent crops: 0%
Other: 98.79% (2012)
Total renewable water resources
170 km^{3} (2011)
Freshwater withdrawal (domestic/industrial/agricultural)
Total: 0.17 km^{3}/yr (49%/8%/42%)
Per capita: 539.2 m^{3}/yr (2005)
Natural hazards
Volcanism, earthquakes, avalanches, and glacial lake outburst flooding (or jökulhlaups)
Environment—current issues
Water pollution from fertilizer runoff; inadequate wastewater treatment

== Physical geography ==
Iceland consists of eight geographical regions, Capital Region, Southern Peninsula, West, Westfjords, Northwest, Northeast, East and South. Twenty per cent of the land is used for grazing, while only one per cent is cultivated. Iceland has lost most of the woodland that previously covered large areas of the country, but an ambitious reforestation program is currently underway. Fossilized tree pollen and descriptions by the early settlers indicate that prior to human settlement, now thought to have occurred from around AD 800 onwards, trees covered between thirty and forty per cent of the island. Today, however, there are only small patches of the original birch forests left, the most prominent being Hallormsstaðaskógur and Vaglaskógur. The country of Iceland contains 36 islands. The longest river on the island is Þjórsá at 230 kilometres (143 miles). Iceland has three national parks: Vatnajökull National Park, Snæfellsjökull National Park, and Þingvellir National Park. The inhabited areas are on the coast, particularly in the southwest, while the central highlands are all but uninhabited. The island's terrain is mostly plateau interspersed with mountain peaks, icefields and a coast deeply indented by bays and fjords.

=== Highlands ===
Topographic map of Iceland. Areas in brown are 500 metres or greater above sea level with the large center mass making up the inhospitable Highlands. Glaciers are shown in white.

The Highlands make up about half of Iceland's land area, which is of recent volcanic origin and consists of a mountainous lava desert (highest elevation 2,110 m (6,923 ft) above sea level) and other wastelands. The area is mostly uninhabited and uninhabitable.

=== Westfjords ===
The Westfjords region is composed of a large, mountainous peninsula on Iceland's northwestern coast. The coastline is marked by numerous fjords as its name suggests. The peninsula contains Iceland's northernmost glacier, Drangajökull.

=== Southern Peninsula ===
The Southern Peninsula, also known as the Reykjanes Peninsula, is located in the southwestern corner of Iceland. The area contains little vegetation because of active volcanism and large lava fields. There are hot springs and sulphur springs in the southern portion of the peninsula, in the Kleifarvatn lake and the Krýsuvík geothermal area.

=== Capital Region ===
Home to Iceland's capital, Reykjavík, the Capital Region is the most densely populated area in Iceland. It is located on the southwest coast of the island near the Southern Peninsula. The majority of Reykjavík is located on the Seltjarnarnes peninsula. Mount Esja, at 914 metres (2,999 ft), is the highest mountain in the vicinity of Reykjavík. Several natural harbours exist and provide good fishing grounds.

=== West ===
Located in the western portion of the island and north of the Capital Region. In Hvalfjörður fjord rests the second-tallest waterfall in Iceland, Glymur. West is also home to Borgarfjörður, a fjord with volcanic activity such as Deildartunguhver, a powerful hotspring. The 804-metre (2,638 ft) Hafnarfjall Mountain rises over the landscape.

=== South ===
The southern portion of Iceland contains some of its most notable volcanoes such as Hekla, Eldgjá, and Katla. Alongside the volcanoes exist numerous glaciers such as Vatnajökull, Mýrdalsjökull, and Eyjafjallajökull. Basalt columns and black sand beaches are examples of the volcanic activity of the area. The area also contains mountain ranges and Iceland's highest peak, Hvannadalshnjúkur, as well as the Vestmannaeyjar (Westman Islands) archipelago.

=== East ===
East Iceland contains the majority of the island's vegetation and birch forests.

=== Atlantic ===
The Atlantic contains large amounts of ice.

=== Glaciers ===
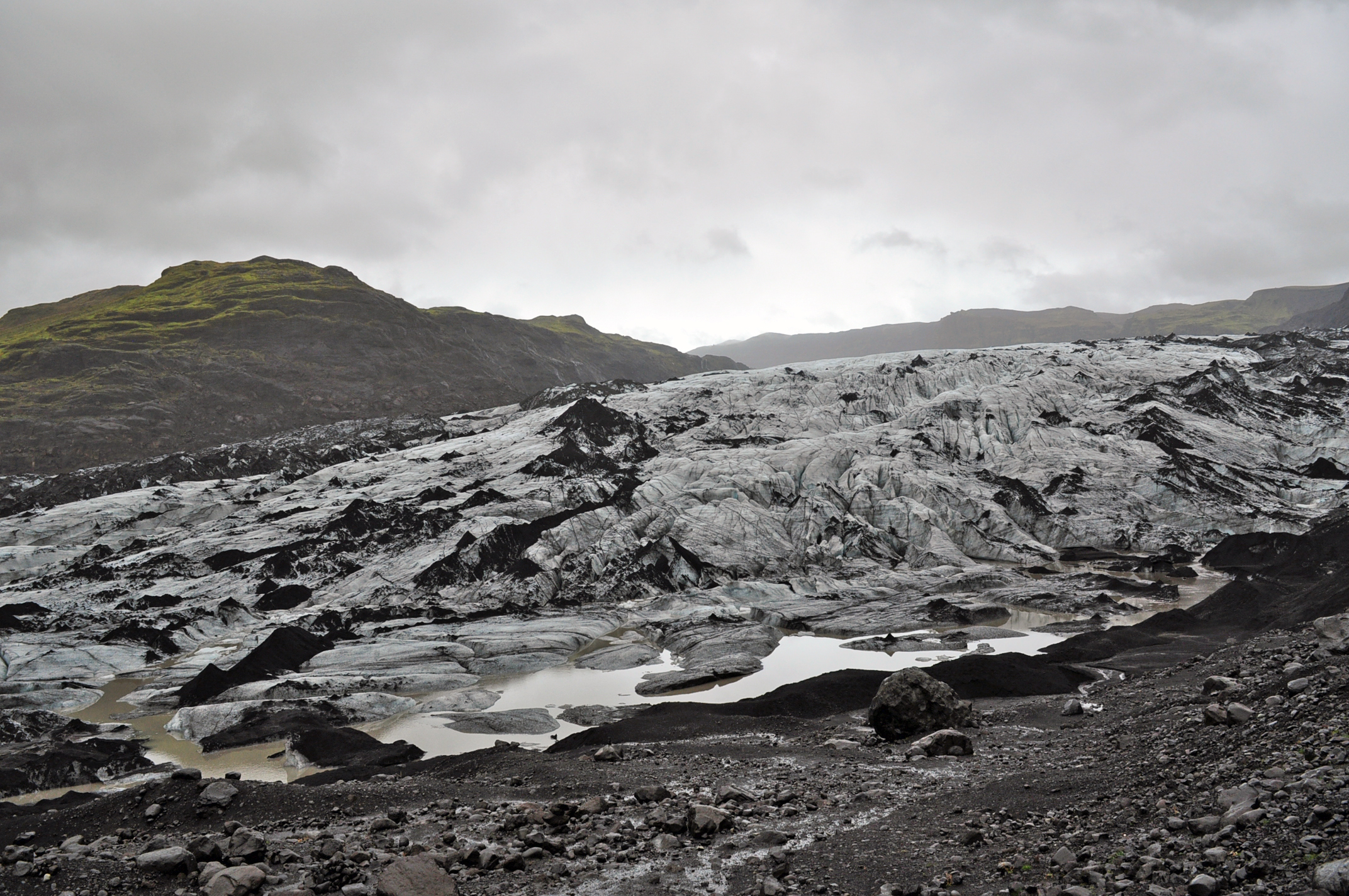
Mýrdalsjökull glacier

Around 10.2 per cent of the total land area is covered by glaciers, although these are retreating at an accelerating rate. The four largest Icelandic glaciers are:

- Hofsjökull (827 km^{2})
- Langjökull (868 km^{2})
- Mýrdalsjökull (542 km^{2})
- Vatnajökull (7,764 km^{2})

Other notable glaciers include:

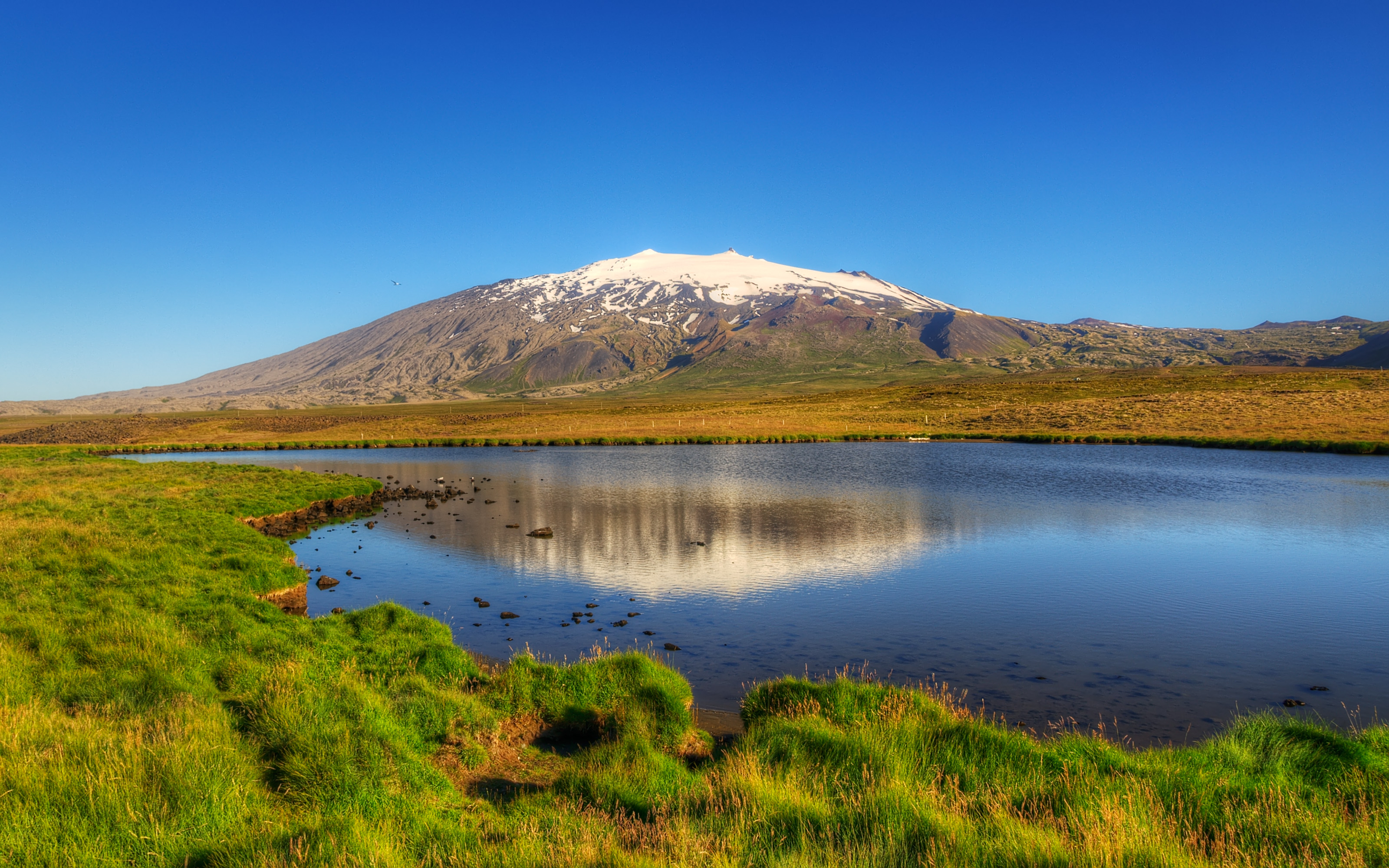
Snæfellsjökull in the morning

- Drangajökull (145 km^{2})
- Eiríksjökull (21 km^{2})
- Eyjafjallajökull (70 km^{2})
- Snæfellsjökull (10 km^{2}).
- Tindfjallajökull (11 km^{2})
- Torfajökull (10 km^{2})
- Tungnafellsjökull (33 km^{2})
- Þórisjökull (25 km^{2})
- Þrándarjökull (16 km^{2})

== Climate ==
Köppen climate classification zones of Iceland

Because of the moderating influence of the North Atlantic Current, the climate is temperate and characterized by damp, cool summers and relatively mild but windy winters. Reykjavík has an average temperature of 12 °C (53.6 °F) in July and 1 °C (34 °F) in January It has a Köppen Climate Classification of Subpolar oceanic climate (Cfc) with most of the island classified as Tundra (ET).

== Geology ==
Iceland has extensive volcanic and geothermal activity. The rift associated with the Mid-Atlantic Ridge, which marks the division between the Eurasian Plate and North American tectonic plates, runs across Iceland from the southwest to the northeast. This geographic feature is prominent at the Þingvellir National Park, where the promontory creates an extraordinary natural amphitheatre. The site was the home of Iceland's parliament, the Alþing, which was first convened in 930. It is a common misconception that Þingvellir is at the juncture between the North American and Eurasian continental plates. However, they are in fact at the juncture of the North American continental plate and a smaller plate (approx. 10,000 km^{2}) called the Hreppar Microplate (Hreppaflekinn). From 1963 to 1967, the island of Surtsey was created on the southwest coast by a volcanic eruption.

=== Geological activity ===
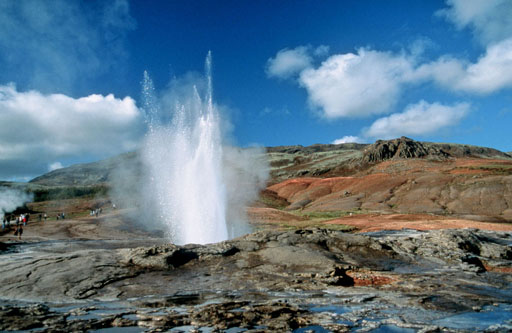
Geysir erupting in September 2000

A geologically young land, Iceland is located on both the Iceland hotspot and the Mid-Atlantic Ridge, which runs right through it. This location means that the island is highly geologically active with earthquakes and volcanoes, notably Hekla, Eldgjá, Herðubreið and Eldfell. Eyjafjallajökull (1,666 m) erupted in 2010, disrupting European air traffic. To demonstrate the geothermal activity, the Icelandic Meteorological Office said that during a single week in February 2021, around 17,000 earthquakes have hit the southwestern region of Reykjanes.

Iceland has many geysers, including Geysir, from which the English word geyser is derived. With the widespread availability of geothermal power, and the harnessing of many rivers and waterfalls for hydroelectricity, most residents have access to inexpensive hot water, heating, and electricity. The island is composed primarily of basalt, a low-silica lava associated with effusive volcanism as has occurred also in Hawaii. Iceland, however, has a variety of volcanic types (composite and fissure), many producing more evolved lavas such as rhyolite and andesite. Iceland has hundreds of volcanoes, with approximately 30 active volcanic systems.

== Environment—international agreements ==
Party to:

Air Pollution, Air Pollution-Persistent Organic Pollutants, Biodiversity, Climate Change, Desertification, Endangered Species, Hazardous Wastes, Law of the Sea, Marine Dumping, Nuclear Test Ban, Ozone Layer Protection, Ship Pollution (MARPOL 73/78), Wetlands, Whaling

Signed, but not ratified:

Environmental Modification, Marine Life Conservation

== Images ==
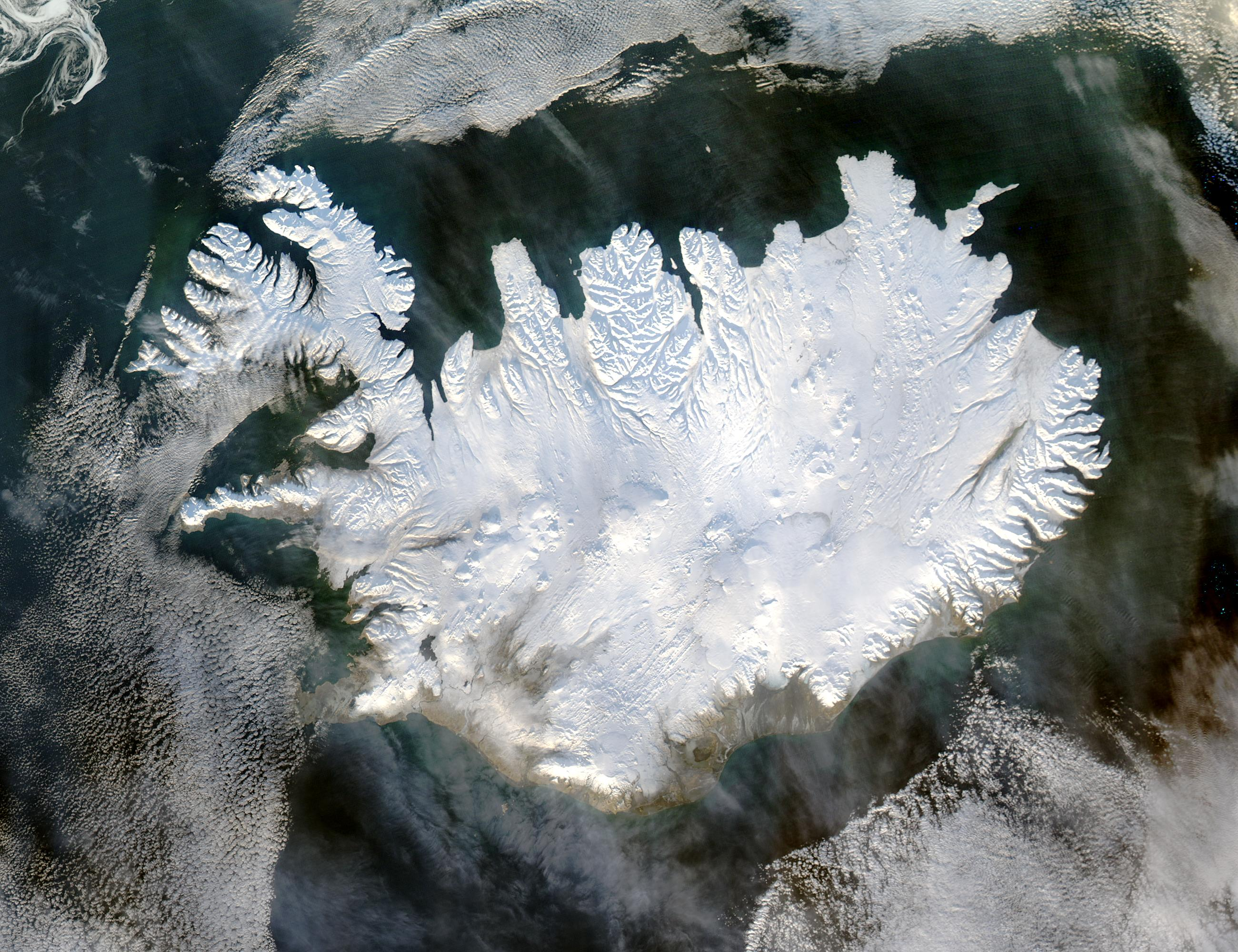
True colour satellite image of Iceland in winter

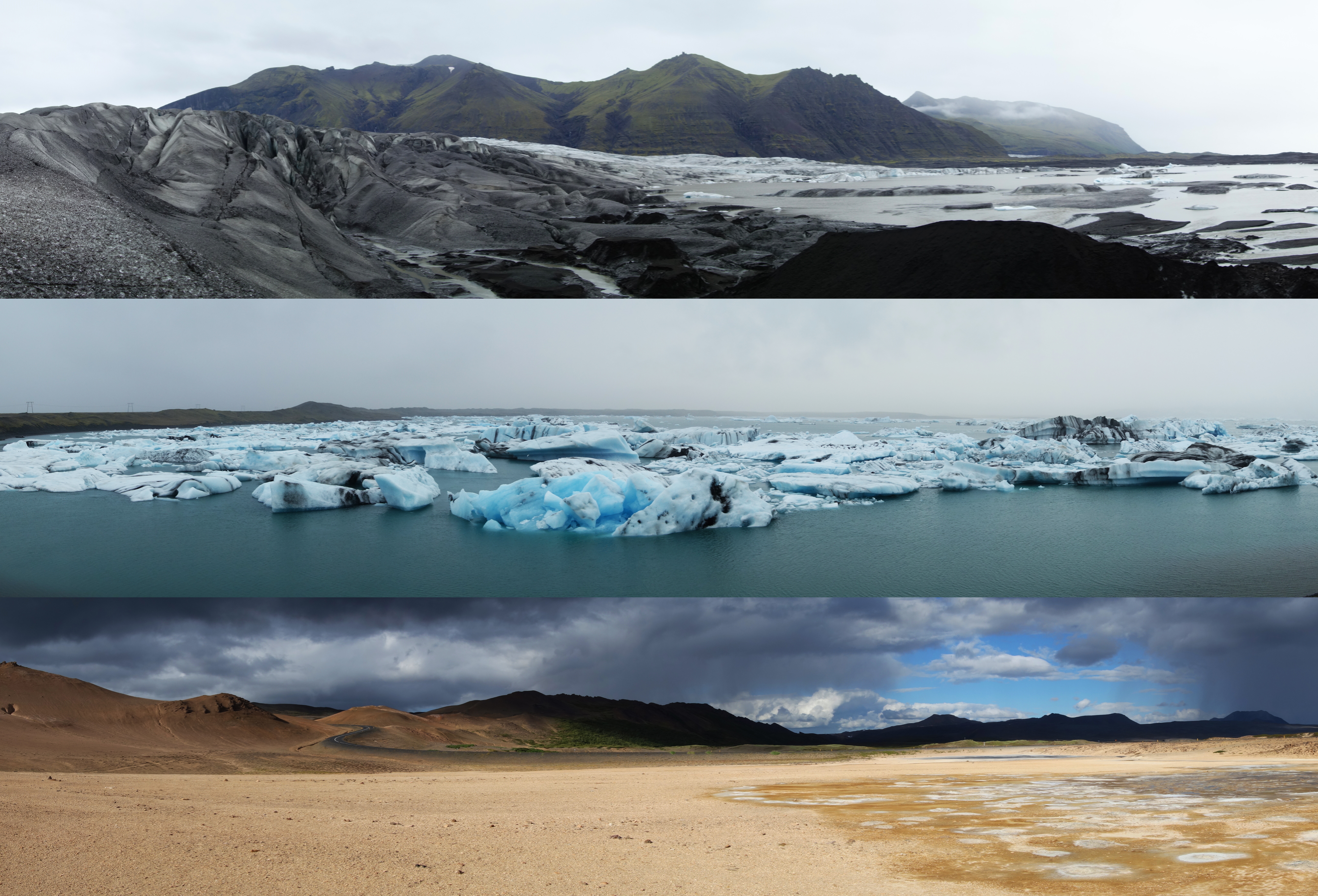
Three typical Icelandic landscapes

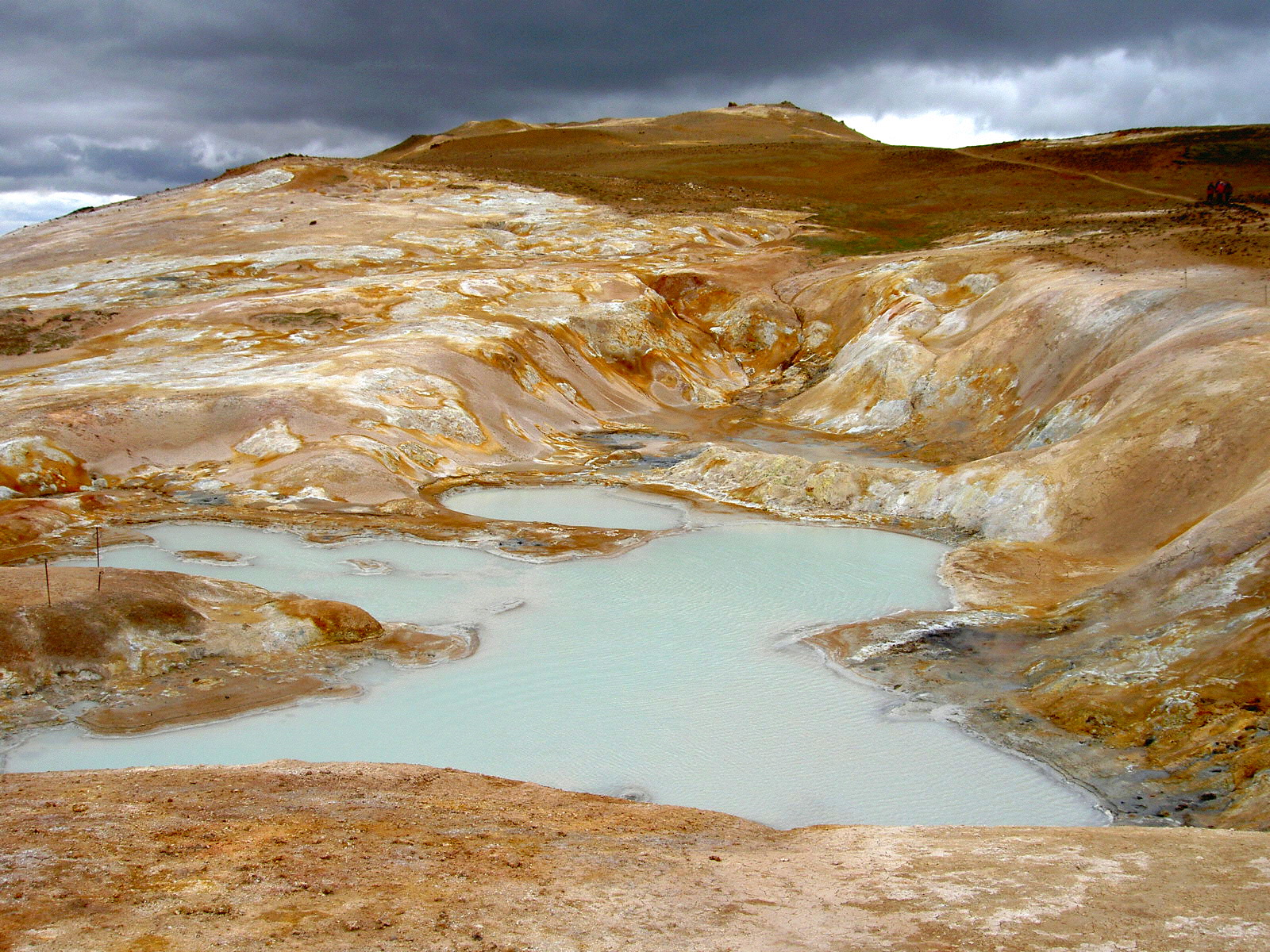
Iceland is rich in sulfur deposits.

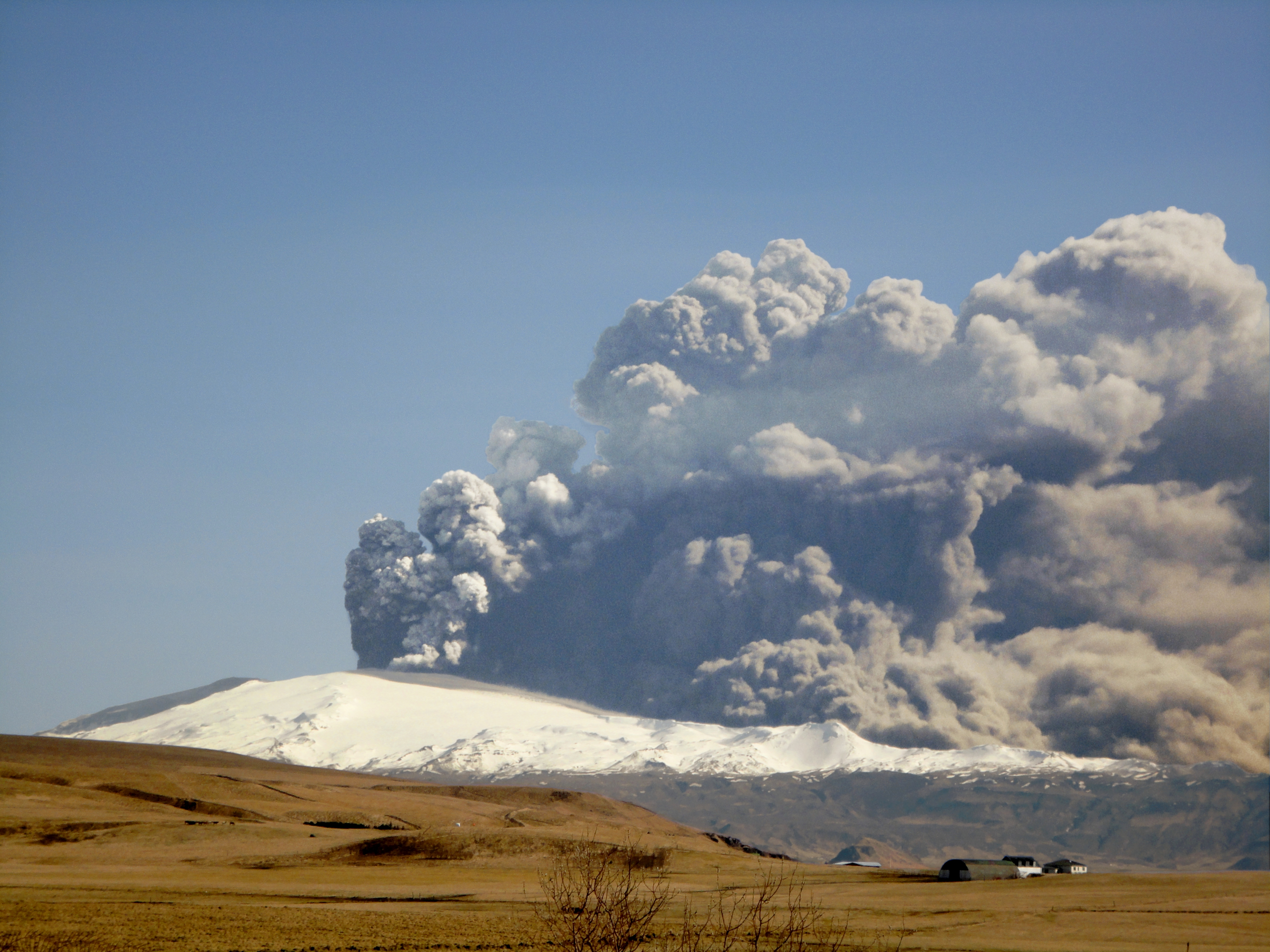
The eruption of Eyjafjallajökull

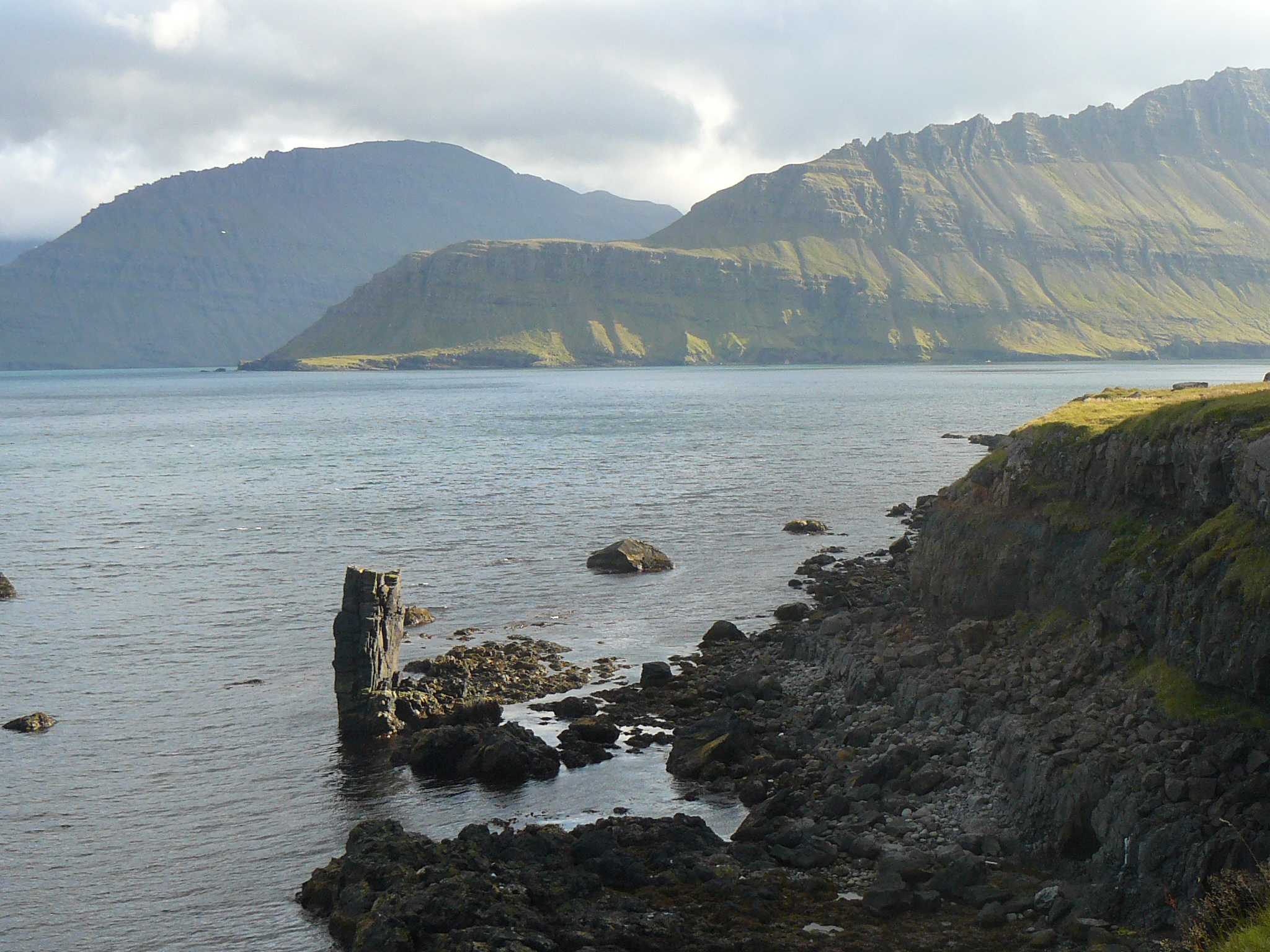
Norðfjörður

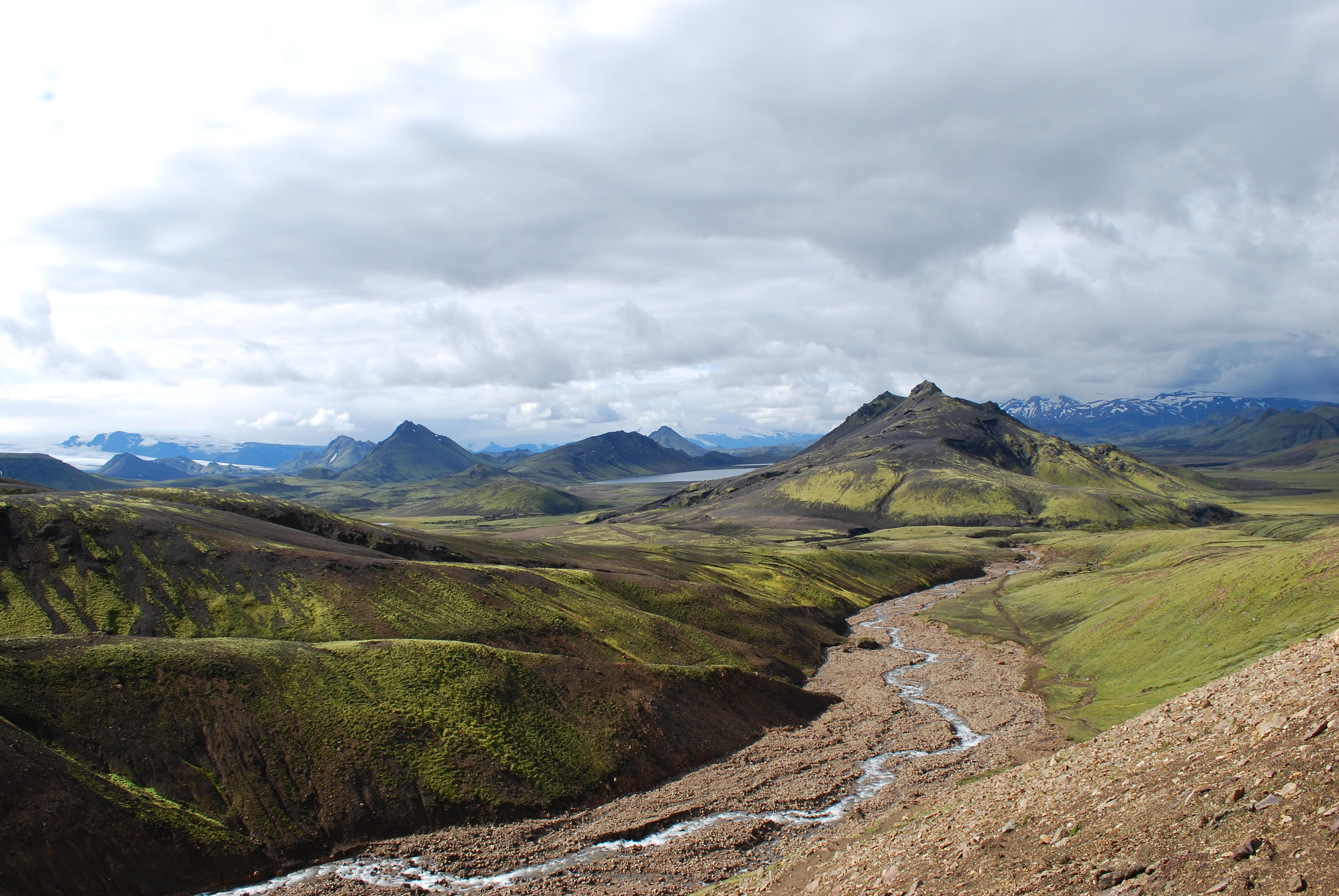
Landscape as seen from Laugavegur hiking trail

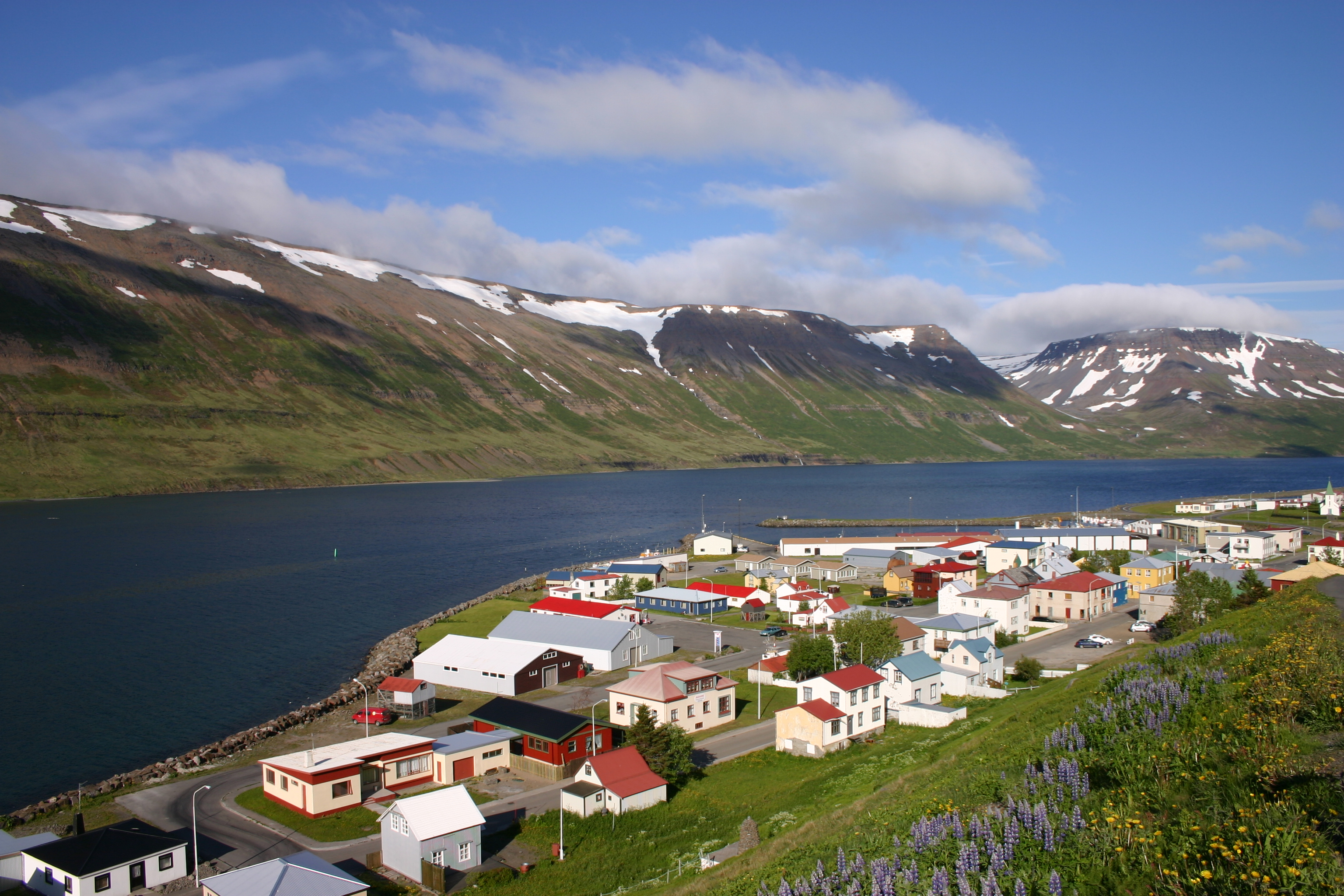
Suðureyri

== Maps ==
Map of Iceland showing major towns and geographical features

Active volcanic areas and systems in Iceland

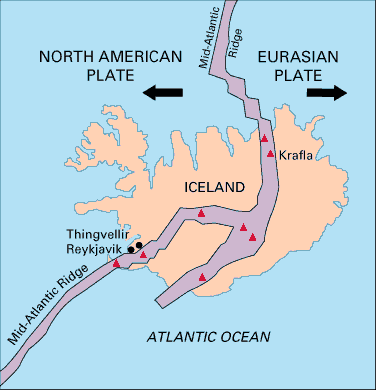
Map showing the Mid-Atlantic Ridge splitting Iceland and separating the North American and Eurasian Plates

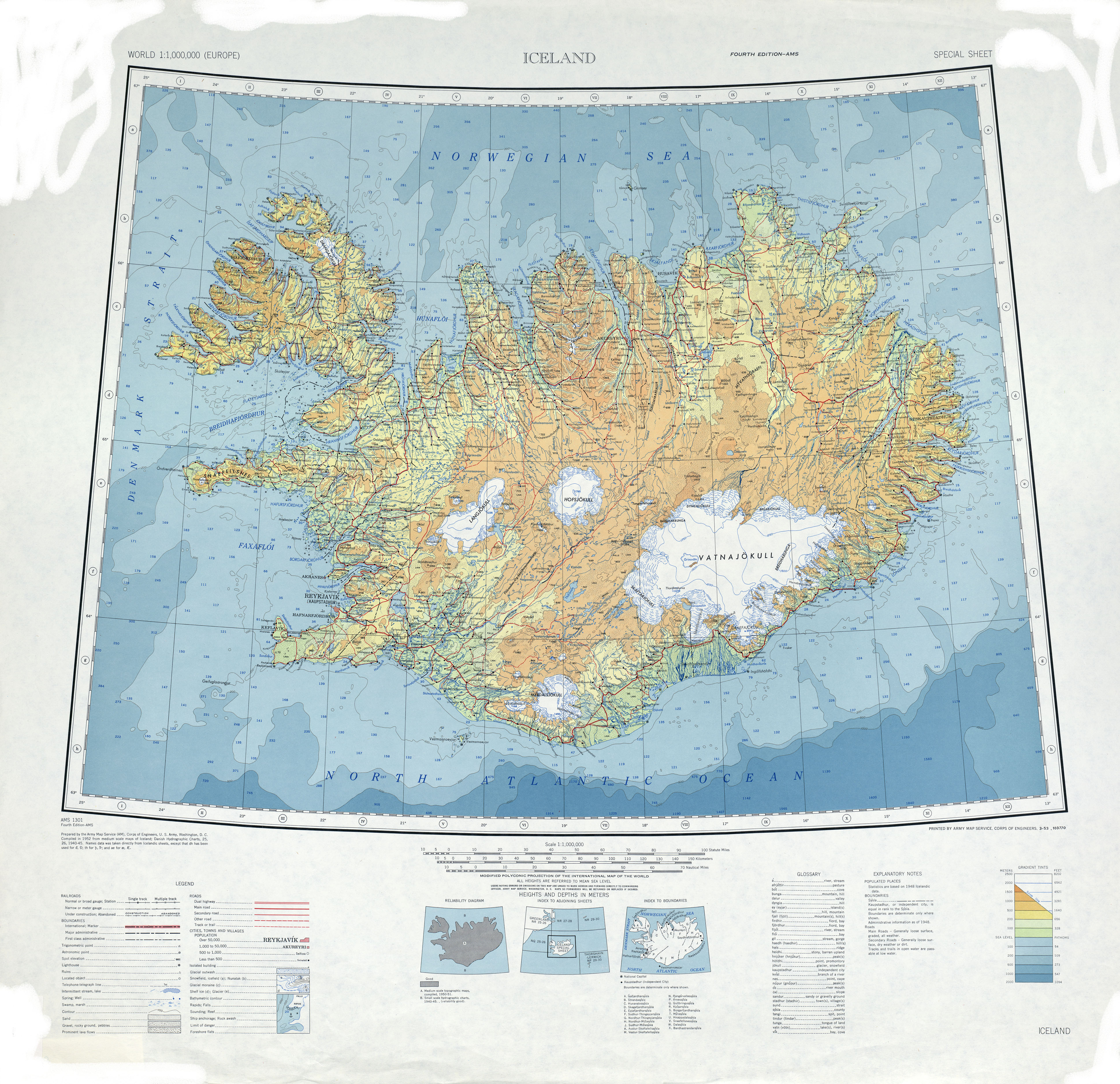
Topographic map of Iceland

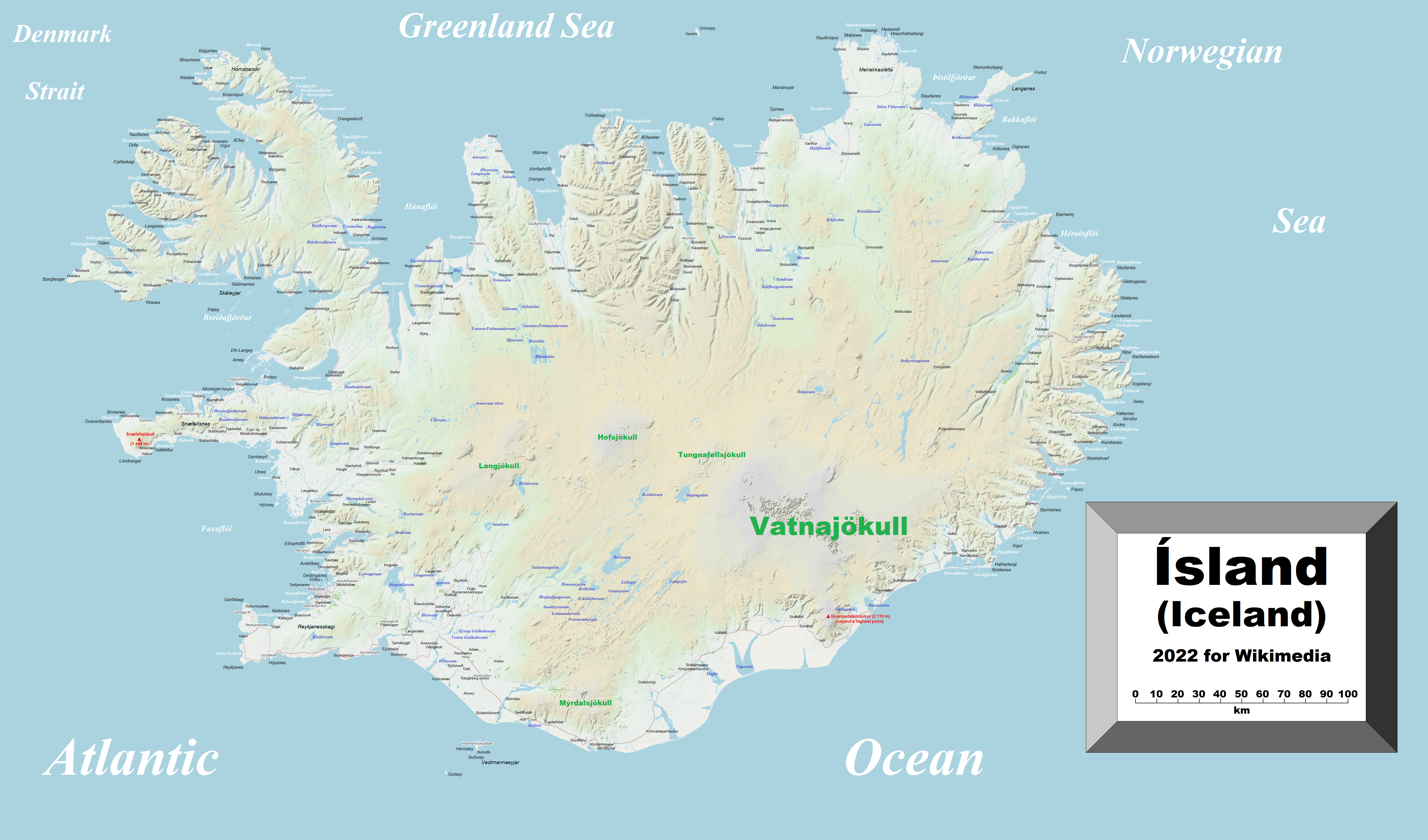
Comprehensive map of Iceland

== See also ==
- Extreme points of Europe
- Highlands of Iceland
- Iceland hotspot
- Iceland plume
- List of earthquakes in Iceland
- List of extreme points of Iceland
- List of fjords of Iceland
- List of islands of Iceland
- List of lakes of Iceland
- List of national parks of Iceland
- List of rivers of Iceland
- List of valleys of Iceland
- List of waterfalls of Iceland
