= Time in Iceland =

- Time zone: Greenwich Mean Time
- Initials: GMT
- UTC offset: UTC+00:00
- Standard meridian: Prime meridian (Greenwich)
- Time notation: 24-hour clock
- Adopted: 7 April 1968

Daylight saving time
- DST not observed

tz database
- Atlantic/Reykjavik

Time in Europe: Light Blue / Western European Time / Greenwich Mean Time (UTC); Blue / Western European Time / Greenwich Mean Time (UTC); Blue / Western European Summer Time / British Summer Time / Irish Standard Time (UTC+1); Red / Central European Time (UTC+1); Red / Central European Summer Time (UTC+2); Yellow / Eastern European Time / Kaliningrad Time (UTC+2); Ochre / Eastern European Time (UTC+2); Ochre / Eastern European Summer Time (UTC+3); Green / Moscow Time / Türkiye Time (UTC+3); Turquoise / Armenia Time / Azerbaijan Time / Georgia Time / Samara Time (UTC+4); Pink / Kazakhstan Time / Yekaterinburg Time (UTC+5); ▉▉▉▉ Pale hues: Standard time observed all year ▉▉▉ Dark hues: Daylight saving time

Iceland observes UTC+00:00 year-round — also known as Greenwich Mean Time. UTC+00:00 was adopted on 7 April 1968 for Iceland to be in sync with Western European Time, replacing UTC−01:00. Officially, Iceland no longer observes daylight saving time — since 1994, there have been an increasing number of proposals made to the Althing to reintroduce daylight saving time, all of which were rejected.

Geographically, most of Iceland lies within the UTC−01:00 offset. However, Iceland observes UTC+00:00 in order to be in sync with Europe, which results in solar noon being significantly later than other countries in the same offset. Health experts have argued that this gives Icelanders social jet lag as the daylight is a misalignment of biological and social time, resulting in detrimental health effects. Despite this, the government decided in 2020 not to change time zones.

== History ==
As Iceland has no international borders nor a railway system, there was no need for a standard time zone across the country. Cities and localities in Iceland were free to pick to observe any time zone they wished, usually based on their mean solar time. This changed at the beginning of the 20th century, with the foundation of Iceland's national telephone company, Landssíminn, in 1906, which allowed for near real-time communication. Accordingly, a law was passed in the Althing on 16 November 1907 stipulating that UTC−01:00 be adopted as the national time zone of Iceland. This was chosen as the majority of Iceland, and particularly the capital Reykjavík, is geographically located within said offset.

Daylight saving time, which moved the clock forward one hour to UTC+00:00, was first attempted between 1917 and 1921. The start and end dates varied, as decided by the government. Daylight saving time was again reintroduced between 1939 and 1968. Between 1941 and 1946, daylight saving time commenced on the first Sunday in March and ended in late October, and between 1947 and 1967 it commenced on the first Sunday in April. In all instances since 1941, daylight saving time commenced at 02:00 and ended at 02:00.

=== Abolishment of daylight saving time and adoption of UTC+00:00 ===
In 1968, astronomers Trausti Einarsson and Þorsteinn Sæmundsson from the University of Iceland made a proposal to the Althing to abolish daylight saving time and adopt UTC+00:00 year-round. They argued that the observation of daylight saving time confused the scheduling times of aircraft in international flights, caused unnecessary work as all clocks had to be reset, disrupted people's sleep patterns – especially infants – and in general caused confusion, irritation and extra hassle to Icelanders. They were not arguing against UTC+00:00, however, but rather against the moving of clocks back and forth as it created the aforementioned inconveniences. Thus, they proposed observing UTC+00:00 year-round as it would "eliminate all of the above problems, but would still preserve the benefits of summer time", such as being better in sync with Europe – making international trading and telephone calls easier – and allowing for more daylight.

The Althing agreed with this proposal, and on 5 April 1968 passed a law stipulating that daylight saving time be abolished and the national time zone be set to UTC+00:00. The law came into effect on 7 April. Since 1994 and most recently in 2019, there have been an increasing number of proposals made to the Althing to reintroduce daylight saving time for a variety of reasons; however, all such proposals and resolutions have been rejected.

=== Proposals to switch to UTC−01:00 ===
In 2014, Björg Þorleifsdóttir, a lecturer at the Faculty of Medicine at the University of Iceland, noted in 2014 that humans' circadian rhythms, which regulate the human sleep–wake cycle, are naturally determined by the solar time of their location. As Iceland does not observe its geographical offset, this leads to disturbed sleep cycles, in turn giving Icelanders – particularly teenagers – social jet lag, resulting in detrimental health effects.

In November 2017, a work group under the Ministry of Health (which also included Björg) began conducting research into Þorleifsdóttir's claims. In January 2018, they concluded that her claims were factually correct and that Iceland should switch its time zone back to UTC−01:00. Public opinion was also in favour of switching to UTC−01:00: in December 2019, a survey conducted by RÚV showed 56 percent of 1,600 respondents supported the proposed change.

In 2020, the government released a statement announcing that they would not be switching time zones. They noted that changing time zones would reduce daylight hours during waking hours by 13%, which could lead to a reduction in exercise and outdoor activities.

A 2025 poll showed that 41% of respondents supported switching to UTC−01:00, 33% were opposed, and 26% were undecided.

== Geography and solar time ==
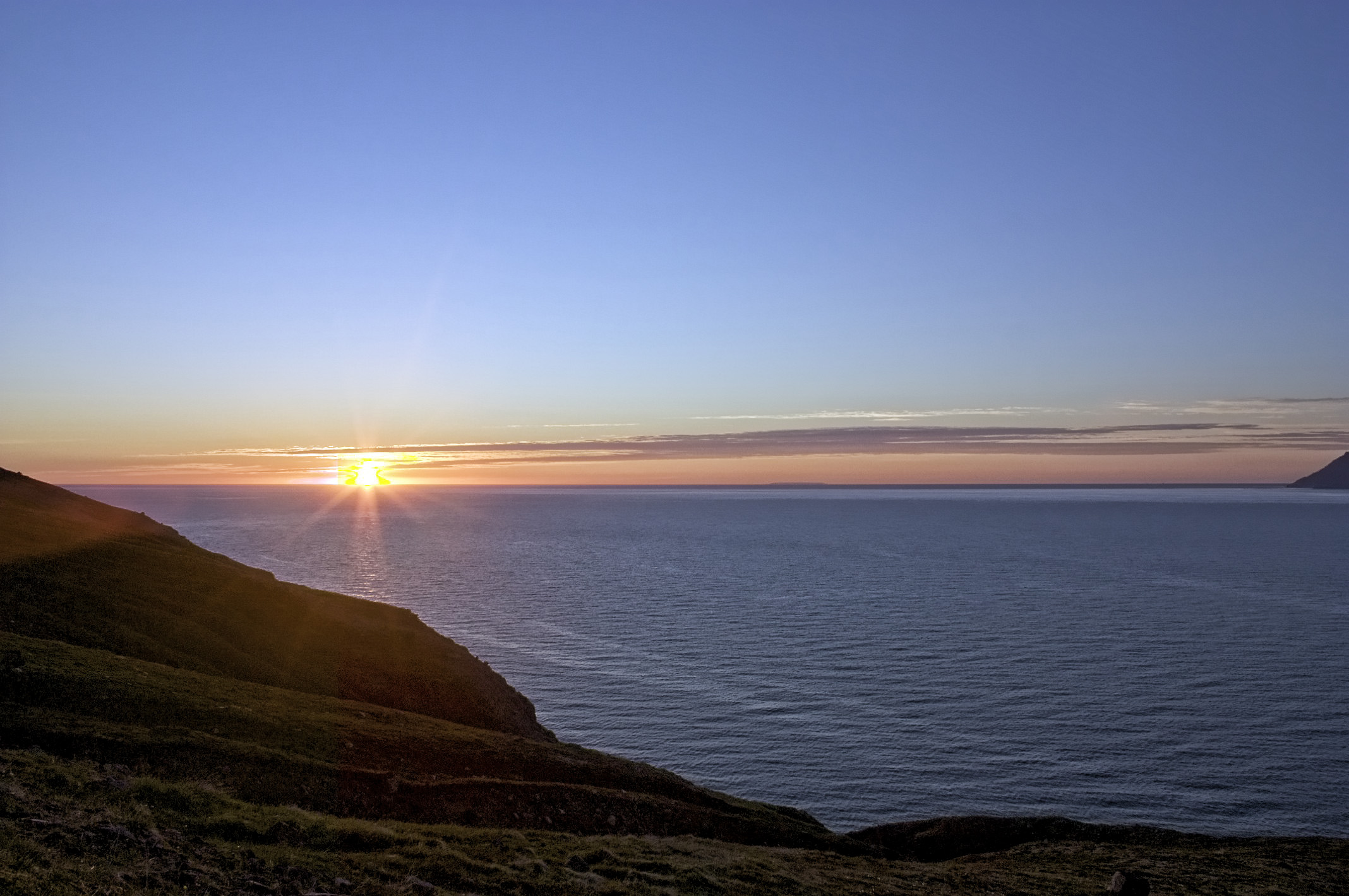
Midnight sun (or rather twilight) in Iceland during the summer

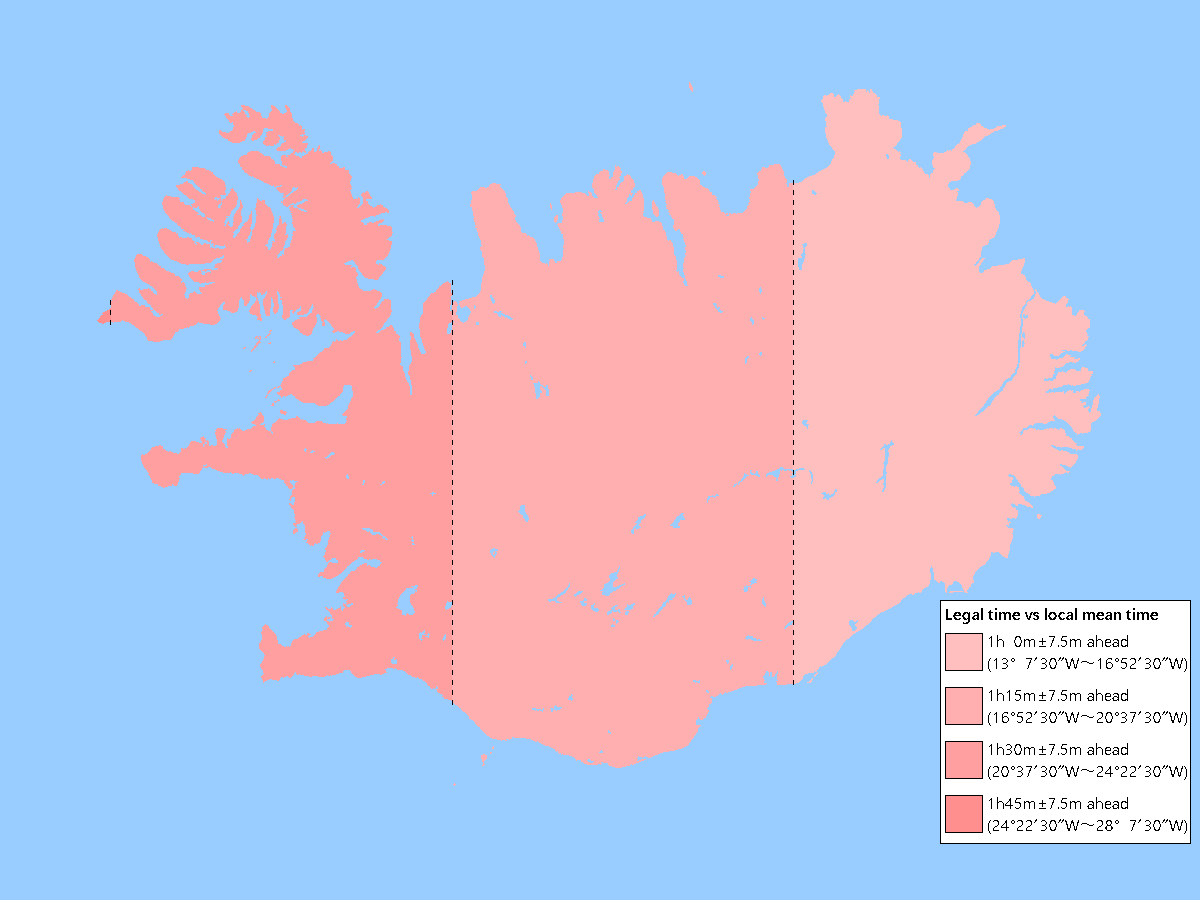
This map shows the difference between legal time and local mean time in Iceland. Iceland is significantly ahead of local solar time as it observes UTC+00:00 instead of the geographical UTC−01:00 or UTC−02:00.

Most of Iceland lies within the geographical UTC−01:00 offset, including the capital Reykjavík, while the westernmost points of Iceland located west of 22.5° West, including Ísafjörður and the Keflavík International Airport, lie within the geographical UTC−02:00 offset. Despite this, Iceland observes UTC+00:00 in order to be in sync with Europe, which results in noon being an hour behind other countries in the same offset — roughly 90 minutes behind London, for example. By being at least an hour ahead of its geographical offset and consequently its solar time, Iceland is essentially on permanent DST.

Midnight sun in Iceland can be experienced in summer on the island of Grímsey off the north coast; the remainder of the country, since it lies just south of the polar circle, experiences a twilight period during which the sun sets briefly, but still has around two weeks of continuous daylight during the summer. The difference of longitude between the western (Bjargtangar; 24°32"W) and easternmost (Hvalbakur; 13°16"W) points of Iceland results in a difference of approximately 45 minutes of solar time.

== Effects on health ==
Because Iceland observes UTC+00:00 instead of the geographical UTC−01:00 or UTC−02:00, solar noon is significantly behind other countries in the same offset. Health experts have argued that this gives Icelanders social jet lag as the daylight is a misalignment of biological and social time, which consequently results in detrimental health effects. As such, several proposals have been made to transition to UTC−01:00 as the standard time zone, all of which have been rejected by the government.

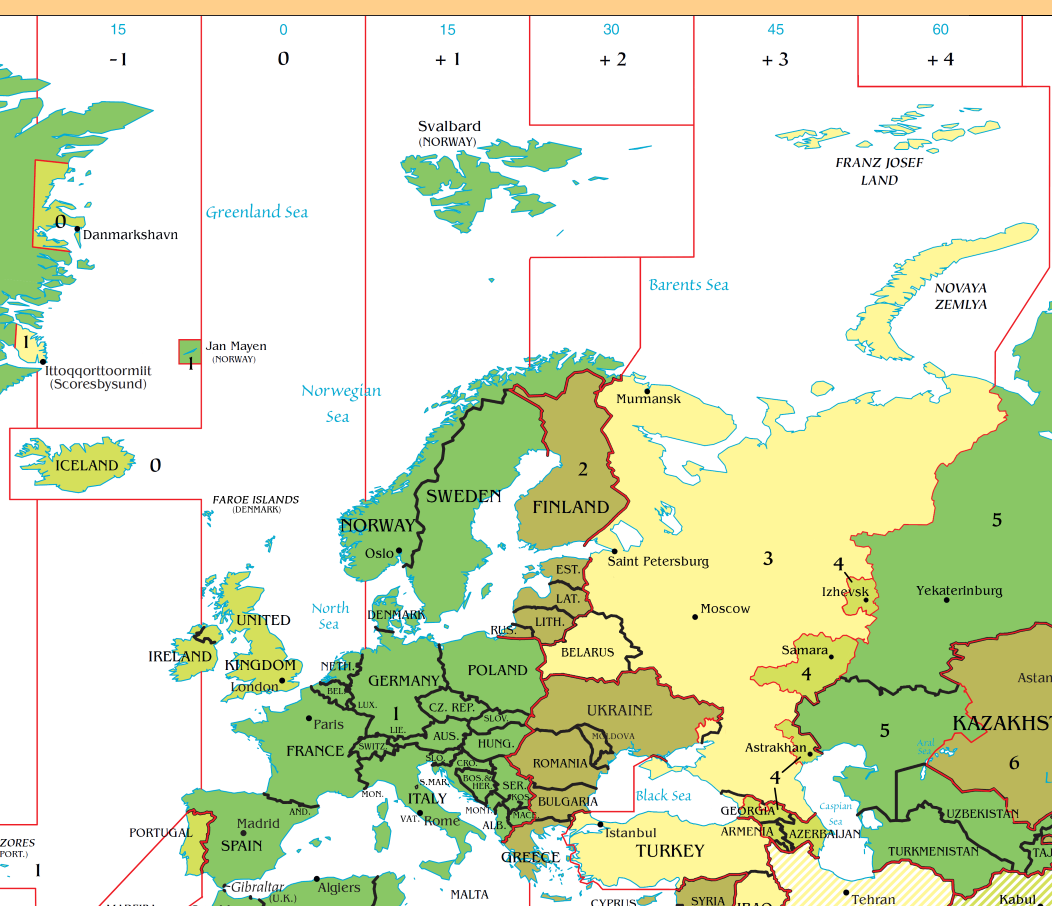
Time zone map showing the misalignment of Iceland's time zone

Björg Þorleifsdóttir, a lecturer at the Faculty of Medicine at the University of Iceland, noted in 2014 that humans' circadian rhythms, the natural internal process that regulates the human sleep–wake cycle, is naturally determined by the solar time of where a person lives. But, as Iceland does not observe its geographical position offset, this makes sunrise, noon and sunset happen roughly an hour and a half later than human's biological clocks indicate, which Björg argued leads to disturbed sleep cycles, in turn giving Icelanders – particularly teenagers – social jet lag, leading to sleep deprivation, slowed reaction times, fatigue, difficulty in concentrating and more frequent mood swings. According to Björg, 35 percent of Icelanders aged between 16 and 19 experience this fatigue. In January 2018, a work group under the Ministry of Health (which also included Björg) further echoed these concerns, when after a study they concluded that Iceland's peculiar position on the geographical time zone map had indeed affected Icelander's health, and in particular led to an "increased risk of illness, poorer schooling, increased depression and fatigue."

However, Þorleifsdóttir's claims have not been without criticism. In 2019, astrophysicist Gunnlaugur Björnsson, while noting the importance of sleep, argued that changing the time zone would not fix sleep deprivation or stop its negative effects, citing "nowhere have I seen research that clock setting affects the progression or recovery of lifestyle diseases and other ailments." He argued that the prevalence of diseases came from lifestyle choices rather than a biological misalignment with a person's social time. He further claimed that "sleep research experts like to state this and seem convinced that this is correct, [saying] 'Studies show that …'. They are usually referring to research into the effects of sleep deprivation, not to the results of systematic research into the effects of timekeeping on physical and mental health."

In 2020, the government released a statement announcing they will not be switching time zones. They noted that changing time zones would reduce daylight hours during waking hours by 13%, which could lead to a reduction in exercise and outdoor activities.

== Notation ==
Iceland uses the 24-hour notation in writing, such as on timetables and business hours, but when speaking the 12-hour notation is commonly used.

== IANA time zone database ==
In the IANA time zone database, Iceland is given one zone in the file zone.tab – Atlantic/Reykjavik. "IS" refer's to the country's ISO 3166-1 alpha-2 country code. The table below displays data taken directly from zone.tab of the IANA time zone database. Columns marked with * are the columns from zone.tab itself:

c.c.*	coordinates*	TZ*	Comments	UTC offset	DST
IS	+6409−02151	Atlantic/Reykjavik		+00:00	+00:00

Computers which do not support "Atlantic/Reykjavik" may use the older POSIX syntax: TZ="GMT0".

== See also ==
- Time in Europe
- List of time zones by country
- List of time zones by UTC offset
