= Barðsneshorn =

Headland in northeastern Iceland

Coordinates: 65.1656°N 13.5149°W

Barðsneshorn (Icelandic pronunciation: [ˈparðsˌnɛsˌhɔ(r)tn̥]) is the extreme end of Barðsnes in the east of Iceland. Barðsneshorn is 9.7 km to the north of Gerpir easternmost point of mainland Iceland.
