= Hvalbakur =

Island in Iceland

- Location within Iceland

Geography
- Location: Atlantic Ocean
- Coordinates: 64°35′45″N 13°16′33″W
- Area: 0.01 km^{2} (0.0039 sq mi)

Administration
- Iceland
- Constituency: Northeast
- Region: Austurland

Demographics
- Population: 0
- Pop. density: 0/km^{2} (0/sq mi)

Additional information
- Time zone: WET (UTC+0)

Hvalbakur (Icelandic pronunciation: [ˈkʰvalˌpaːkʏr̥], meaning 'whale back') is a small, uninhabited island off the coast of Iceland and is the country's easternmost point. It is located in the Austurland region, 35 kilometres (22 mi) from the mainland. It is 200 metres (660 ft) long and up to 100 metres (330 ft) wide, with its highest point 5 metres (16 ft) above sea level. The island appears on maps from 1761 but may have been sighted much earlier.

== See also ==
- Kolbeinsey
- Extreme points of Iceland
- Geography of Iceland
- List of islands off Iceland
- Geology of Iceland
