= Bjargtangar Lighthouse =

Lighthouse in Iceland

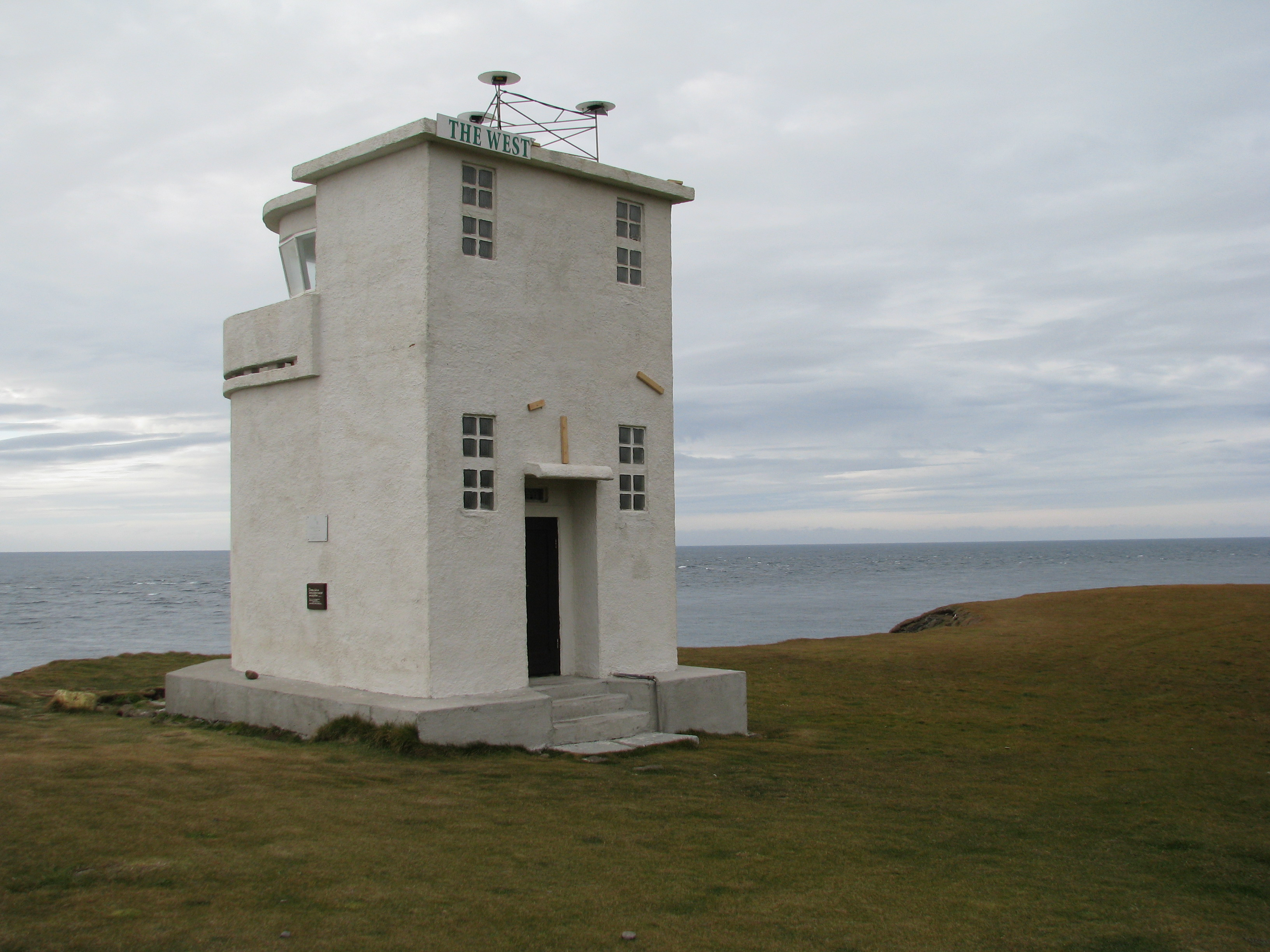
- Location: Westfjords peninsula
- Coordinates: 65°30′08.7″N 24°31′53.9″W

Tower
- Constructed: 1913 (first)
- Construction: concrete building
- Height: 6 m (20 ft)
- Shape: 2-story square prism building with lantern
- Markings: white building

Light
- First lit: 1948
- Focal height: 60 m (200 ft)
- Characteristic: Fl(3) W 15 s.
- Iceland no.: VIT-087

The Bjargtangar Lighthouse (Icelandic: Bjargtangaviti [ˈpjarkˌtʰauŋkaˌvɪːtɪ], regionally also [-tʰaŋk-]) is a lighthouse located on the cliffs of Látrabjarg in northwestern Iceland. It marks the westernmost point of Iceland and is the westernmost building of Europe.

== History and description ==
The Bjargtangar Light Station was established in 1913. The present tower was built in 1948. It is two stories high, built of concrete, and painted entirely white. The lantern house is on the second floor and faces the sea. Because the lighthouse is on a high cliff, the light's focal plane is 60 m (200 ft) above the sea. The site (but not the tower) is open to visitors, although access is difficult.

== See also ==
- List of lighthouses in Iceland
