= List of extreme points of Iceland =

Extreme points of Iceland

This is a list of the extreme points of Iceland, the points that are farther north, south, east or west than any other location.

== Iceland (country) ==
- Northernmost point — Kolbeinsey, Eyjafjörður (67°08′09″N 18°41′03″W)
- Northernmost settlement — Grímsey, Eyjafjörður (66°33′N 18°01′W)
- Southernmost point — Surtsey, Vestmannaeyjar (63°17′N 20°35′W)
- Southernmost settlement (farm) — Garðar, Vestur-Skaftafellssýsla (63°24'N, 019°03'W)
- Southernmost settlement (town) — Vík, Vestur-Skaftafellssýsla (63°25'N, 019°01'W)
- Westernmost point — Bjargtangar, Vestur-Barðastrandarsýsla (65°30′N 24°32′W)
- Westernmost settlement (farm) — Hvallátur, Vestur-Barðastrandarsýsla (65°32'N, 024°28'W)
- Westernmost settlement (town) — Patreksfjörður, Vestur-Barðastrandarsýsla (65°35'N, 23°59'W)
- Easternmost point — Hvalbakur, Suður-Múlasýsla (64°35′N 13°14′W)
- Easternmost settlement (farm) — Sandvík, Suður-Múlasýsla (65°06'N, 013°33'W)
- Easternmost settlement (town) — Neskaupstaður (65°09'N, 13°43'W)

== Iceland (mainland Iceland) ==
- Northernmost point — Rifstangi, Norður-Þingeyjarsýsla (66°32'N, 016°12'W)
- Northernmost settlement (farm) — Rif, Norður-Þingeyjarsýsla (66°32'N, 016°12'W)
- Northernmost settlement (town) — Raufarhöfn, Norður-Þingeyjarsýsla (66°27'N, 015°57'W)
- Southernmost point — Kötlutangi, Vestur-Skaftafellssýsla (63°23'N, 018°45'W)
- Southernmost settlement (farm) — Garðar, Vestur-Skaftafellssýsla (63°24'N, 019°03'W)
- Southernmost settlement (town) — Vík, Vestur-Skaftafellssýsla (63°25'N, 019°01'W)
- Westernmost point — Bjargtangar, Vestur-Barðastrandarsýsla (65°30'N, 024°32'W)
- Westernmost settlement (farm) — Hvallátur, Vestur-Barðastrandarsýsla (65°32'N, 024°28'W)
- Westernmost settlement (town) — Patreksfjörður, Vestur-Barðastrandarsýsla (65°35'N, 023°59'W)
- Easternmost point — Gerpir, Suður-Múlasýsla (65°04'N, 013°29'W)
- Easternmost settlement (farm) — Sandvík, Suður-Múlasýsla (65°06'N, 013°33'W)
- Easternmost settlement (town) — Neskaupstaður (65°09'N, 013°43'W)

== Altitude ==
- Highest point — Hvannadalshnúkur, 2,110 metres (6,923 ft)(64°00′N 16°39′W)
- Lowest point — Atlantic Ocean, 0 metres (0 ft)
- Highest village — Möðrudalur, 469 metres (1,539 ft)

== See also ==
- Geography of Iceland
- Extreme points of Earth
