= Látrabjarg =

Promontory in Iceland

- Promontory
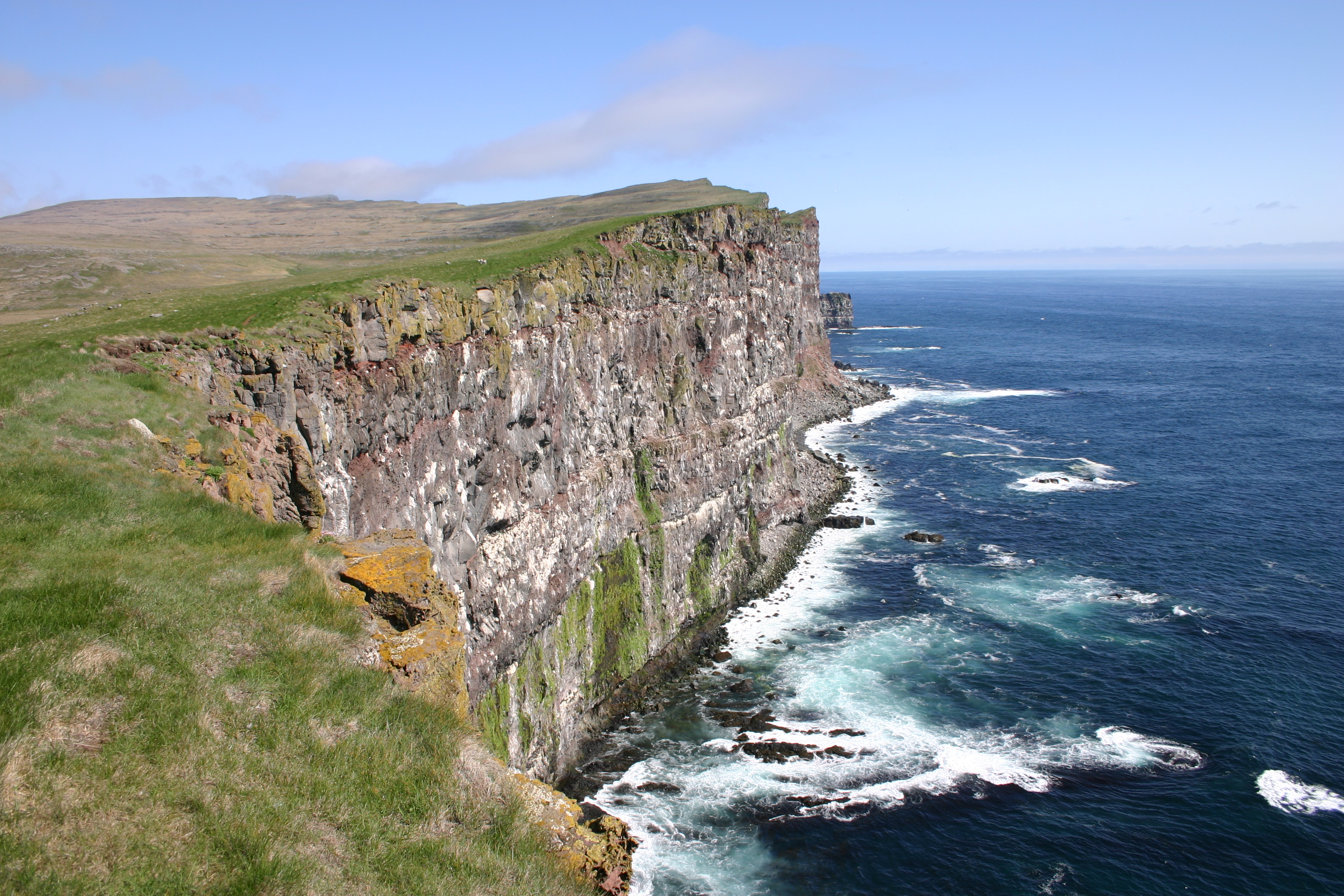

- Location within Iceland
- Coordinates: 65.5°N 24.5°W
- Location: Westfjords, Iceland

Látrabjarg (Icelandic pronunciation: [ˈlauːtraˌpjark]) is a promontory in the Westfjords of Iceland, and the westernmost point in Iceland. The cliffs are home to millions of birds, including puffins, northern gannets, guillemots and razorbills. Látrabjarg contains one of the largest kittiwake habitats in Iceland. It is Europe's largest bird cliff, 14 km (9 mi) long and up to 440 metres (1,440 ft) high. In 2026, a solar eclipse was visible at Látrabjarg.

== Gallery ==
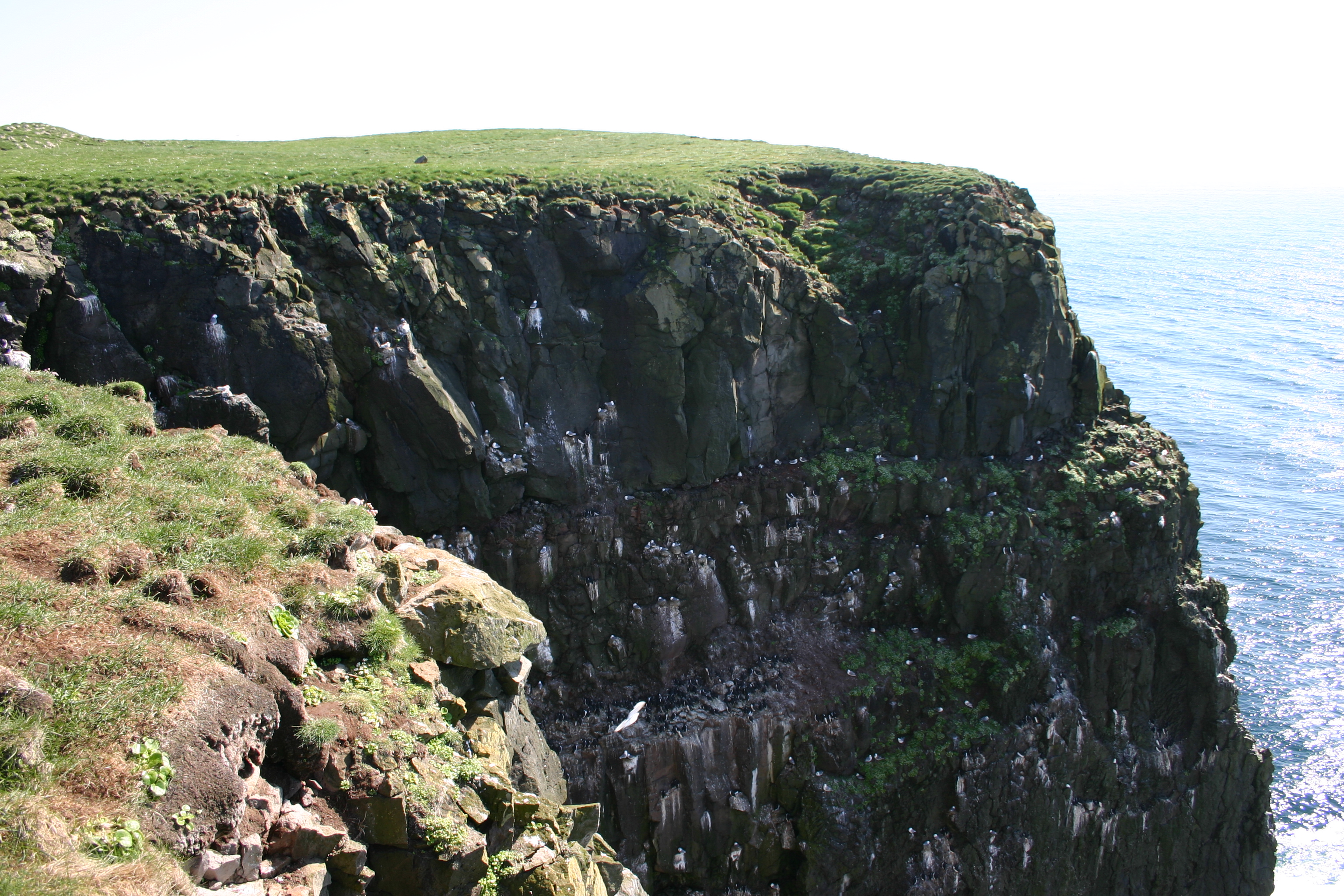

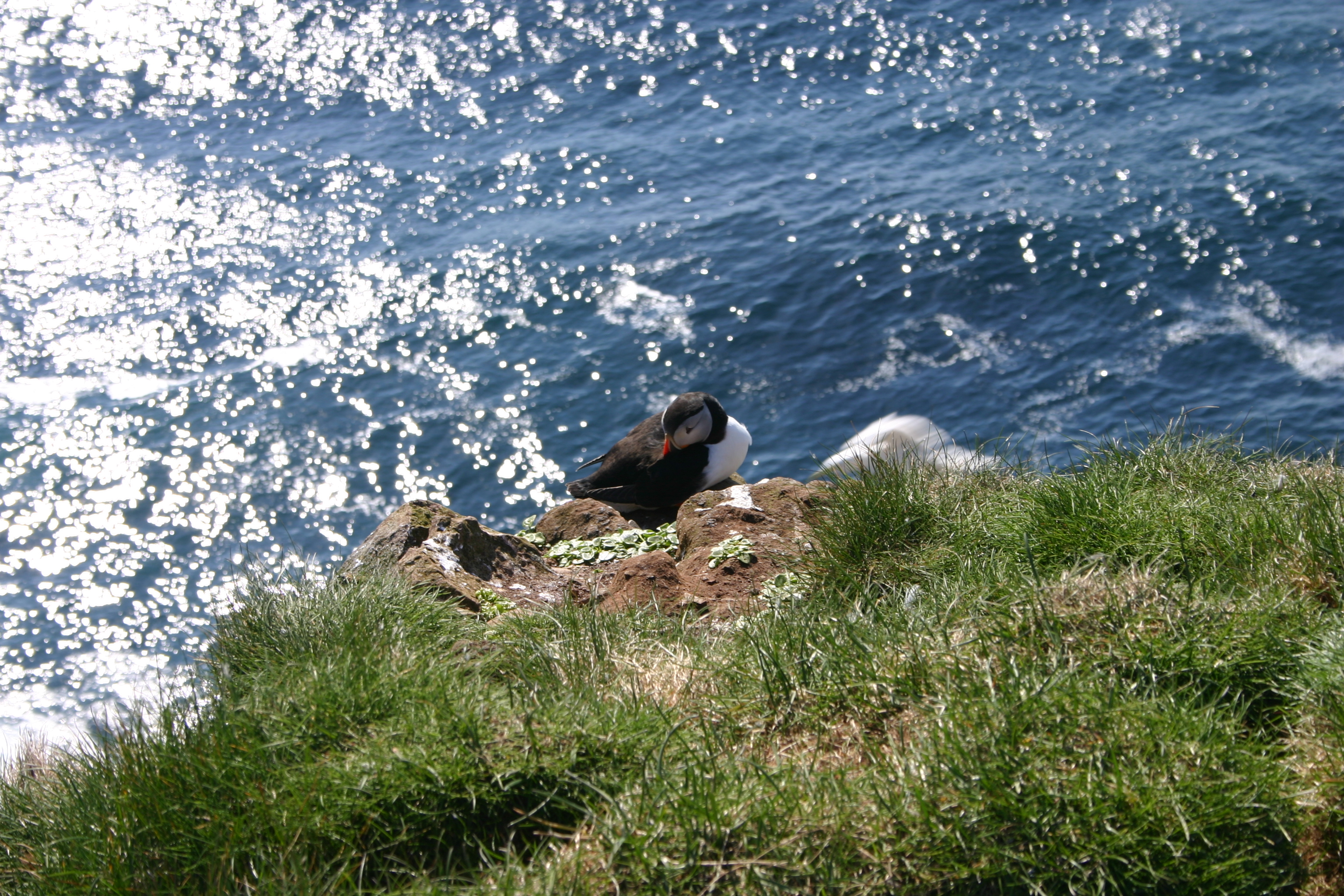

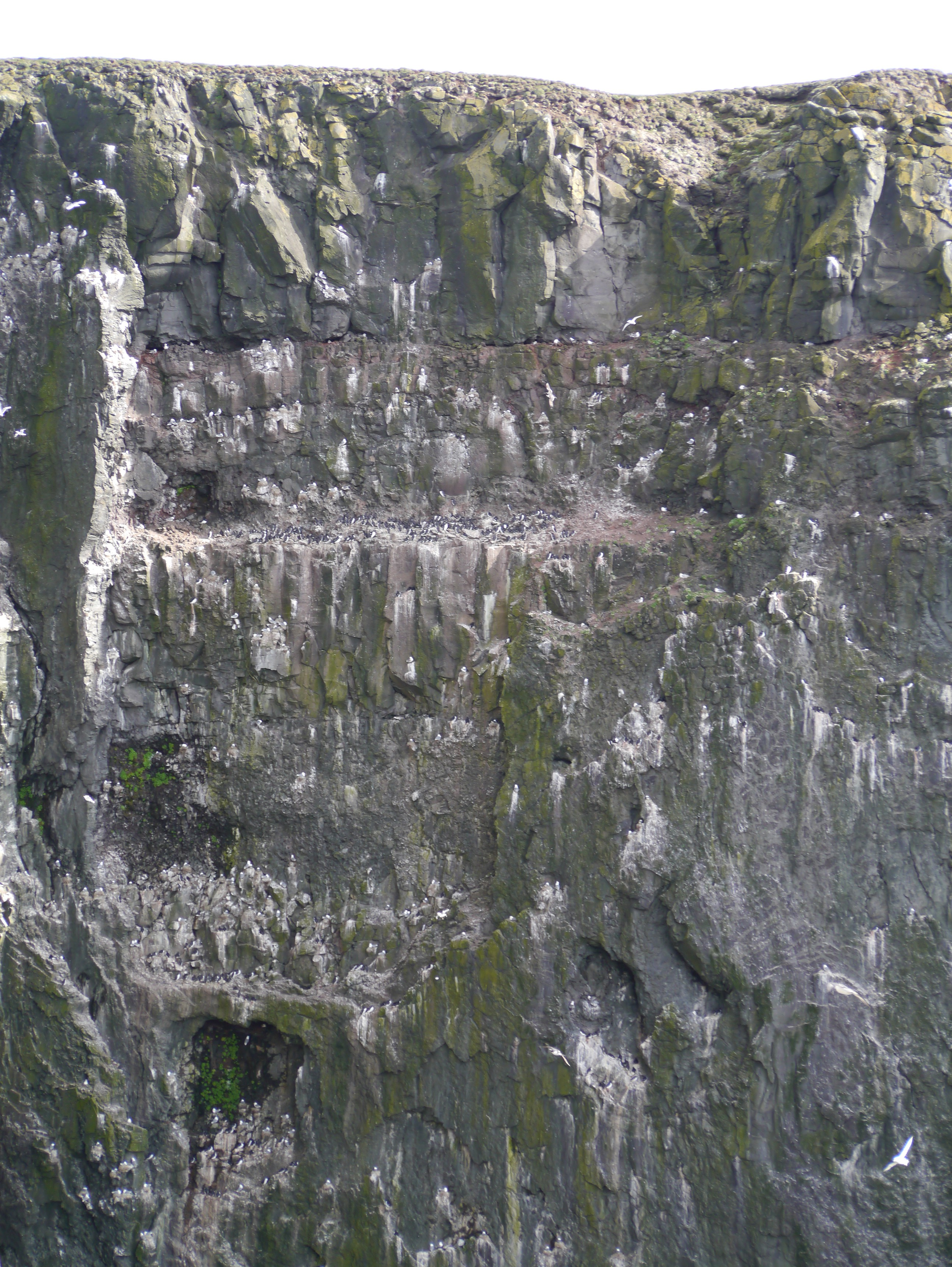

== See also ==
- Bjargtangar
- Bjargtangar Lighthouse
