= UTC+00:00 =

Identifier for the UTC +0 offset

- Time zone
- World map with the time zone highlighted

UTC offset
- UTC: UTC+00:00

Current time
- 19:32, 2 October 2026 UTC+00:00 [refresh]

Central meridian
- 0 degrees

Date-time group
- Z

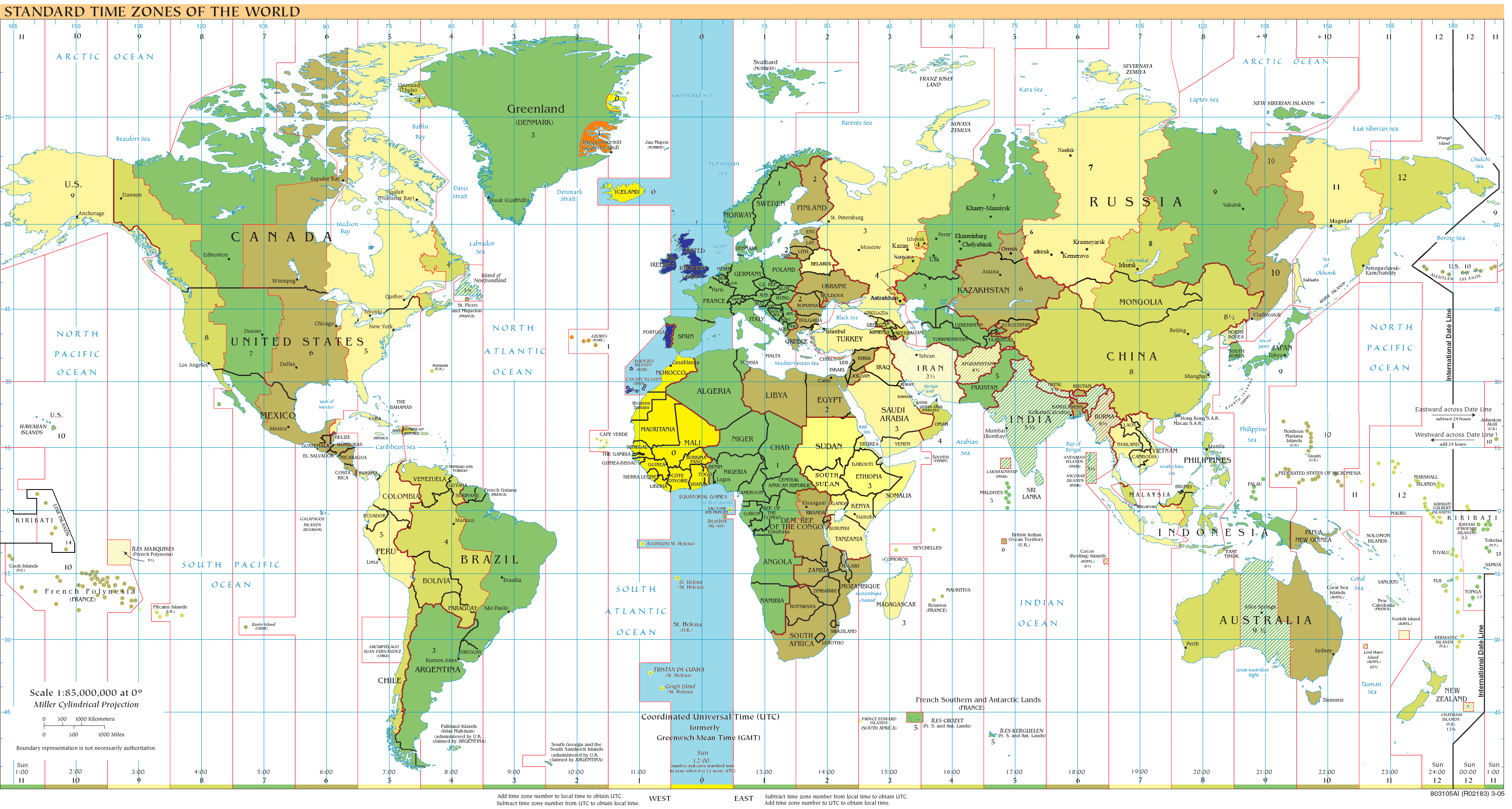
UTC±00:00: black (January), orange (July), yellow (year-round), light blue (sea areas)

Time in Europe: Light Blue / Western European Time / Greenwich Mean Time (UTC); Blue / Western European Time / Greenwich Mean Time (UTC); Blue / Western European Summer Time / British Summer Time / Irish Standard Time (UTC+1); Red / Central European Time (UTC+1); Red / Central European Summer Time (UTC+2); Yellow / Eastern European Time / Kaliningrad Time (UTC+2); Ochre / Eastern European Time (UTC+2); Ochre / Eastern European Summer Time (UTC+3); Green / Moscow Time / Turkey Time (UTC+3); Turquoise / Armenia Time / Azerbaijan Time / Georgia Time / Samara Time (UTC+4); ▉▉▉▉ Pale hues: Standard time observed all year ▉▉▉ Dark hues: Daylight saving time

UTC+00:00 is an identifier for a time offset from UTC of +00:00. This time zone is the basis of Coordinated Universal Time (UTC) and all other time zones are based on it. In ISO 8601, an example of the associated time would be written as 2020-06-27T01:05:00+00:00. It is also known by the following geographical or historical names:

- Greenwich Mean Time
- Western European Time
- Azores Summer Time
- Eastern Greenland Summer Time
- Western Sahara Standard Time
- Coordinated Universal Time

== As standard time (Northern Hemisphere winter) ==
Principal cities: London, Manchester, Birmingham, Edinburgh, Liverpool, Bristol, Belfast, Glasgow, Cardiff, Dublin, Limerick, Las Palmas de Gran Canaria, Santa Cruz de Tenerife, Lisbon, Porto

=== Europe ===
==== Western Europe ====
- Ireland (Irish Standard Time is UTC+01:00, see explanation below)
- Portugal (WET)
- United Kingdom and the adjacent Crown Dependencies (Channel Islands and the Isle of Man) (GMT)
  - (England, Wales, Scotland and Northern Ireland)
- Faroe Islands (WET)

==== Atlantic islands ====
- Portugal
  - Madeira (WET)
- Spain
  - Canary Islands (WET)

Notes:

1. The westernmost point where UTC with DST is applied is El Hierro, Canary Islands, Spain (18°00′ W). Time used there is 2 hours and 12 minutes ahead of physical time in the summer, making for the greatest discrepancy in the UTC time zone.
2. The easternmost settlement where UTC with DST is applied is Lowestoft in Suffolk, East Anglia, UK (at just 1°45′ E).
3. Whilst de facto Ireland operates on the same time as the United Kingdom, its de jure basis to do so differs. Whereas standard time in the UK is GMT in winter and BST (daylight saving time) in summer, Irish Standard Time (UTC+01:00) is observed in summer and GMT is used in winter. For details, see below.

== As daylight saving time (Northern Hemisphere summer) ==
=== Europe ===
- Portugal
  - Azores islands

== As standard time (year-round) ==
Principal cities: Reykjavík, Accra, Bamako, Dakar, Abidjan, Conakry, Ouagadougou, São Tomé, Bissau, Monrovia, Nouakchott, Freetown, Lomé, El Aaiún (Laayoune), Tifariti, Tindouf, Rabat, Casablanca, Tangier, Marrakesh, Fez, Tangier

=== Africa ===
==== West Africa ====
===== Greenwich Mean Time =====
- Burkina Faso
- Ivory Coast
- The Gambia
- Ghana
- Guinea
- Guinea-Bissau
- Liberia
- Mali
- Mauritania
- Morocco
- Sahrawi Arab Democratic Republic (disputed territory)
- São Tomé and Príncipe (since 2018)
- Senegal
- Sierra Leone
- Togo

=== Europe (and possessions) ===
==== Atlantic islands ====
- Greenland
  - Danmarkshavn and surrounding area
  - Station Nord
- Iceland
- United Kingdom
  - Saint Helena, Ascension and Tristan da Cunha
    - Saint Helena
    - Ascension Island
    - Tristan da Cunha

=== Antarctica ===
Some bases in Antarctica.

- Norway
  - Troll Station

Notes:

1. The westernmost point where UTC with no DST is applied is Bjargtangar, at the northwest peninsula of Iceland (24°32′ W). Time used there is 1 hour and 38 minutes ahead of physical time. This is the greatest deviation from physical time for UTC+00:00 with no DST.

== Discrepancies between use of UTC+00:00 as standard time rather than local solar time ==
Colour	Legal time vs local mean time
	1 h ± 30 m behind
	0 h ± 30 m
	1 h ± 30 m ahead
	2 h ± 30 m ahead
	3 h ± 30 m ahead

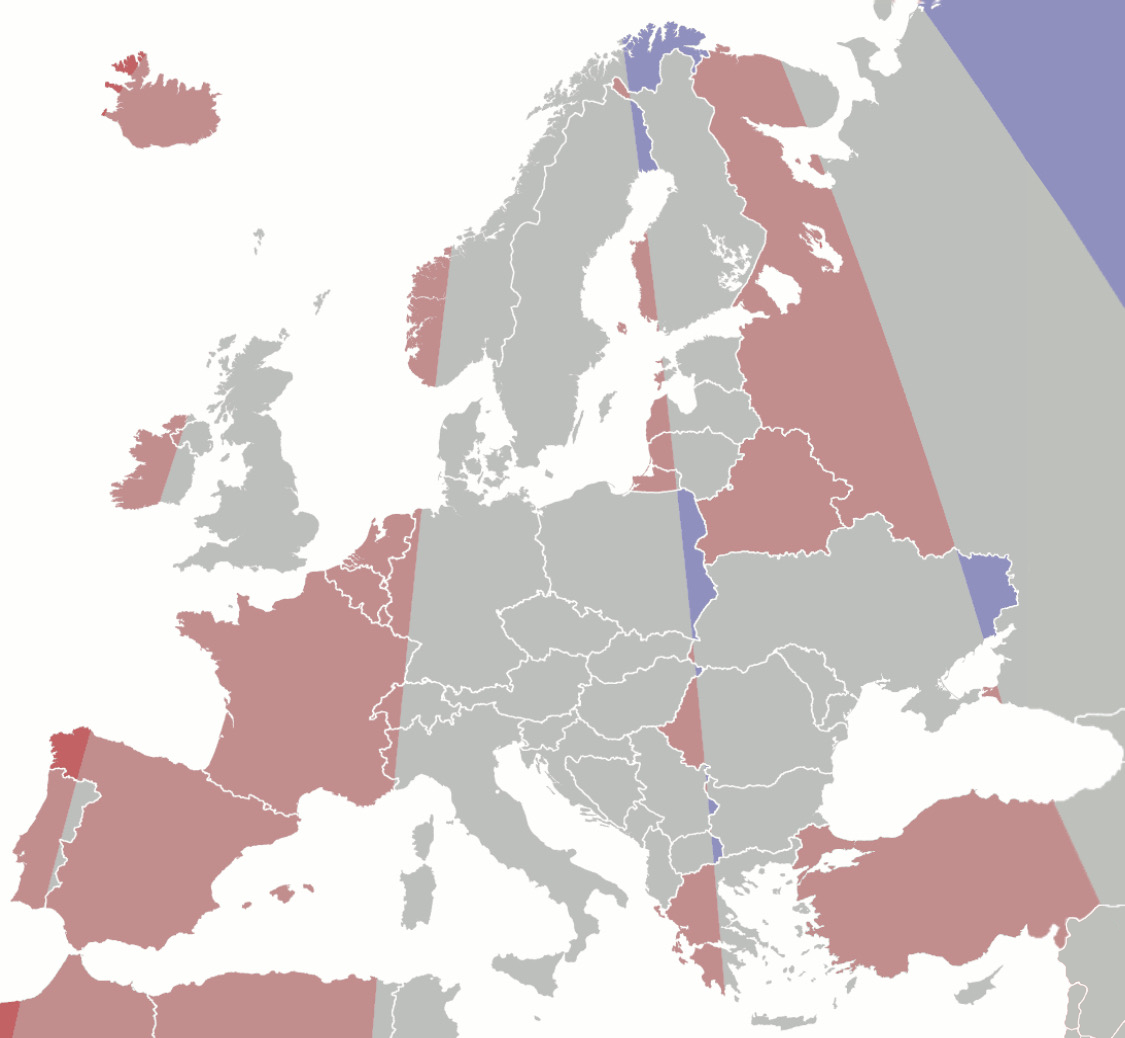
European winter

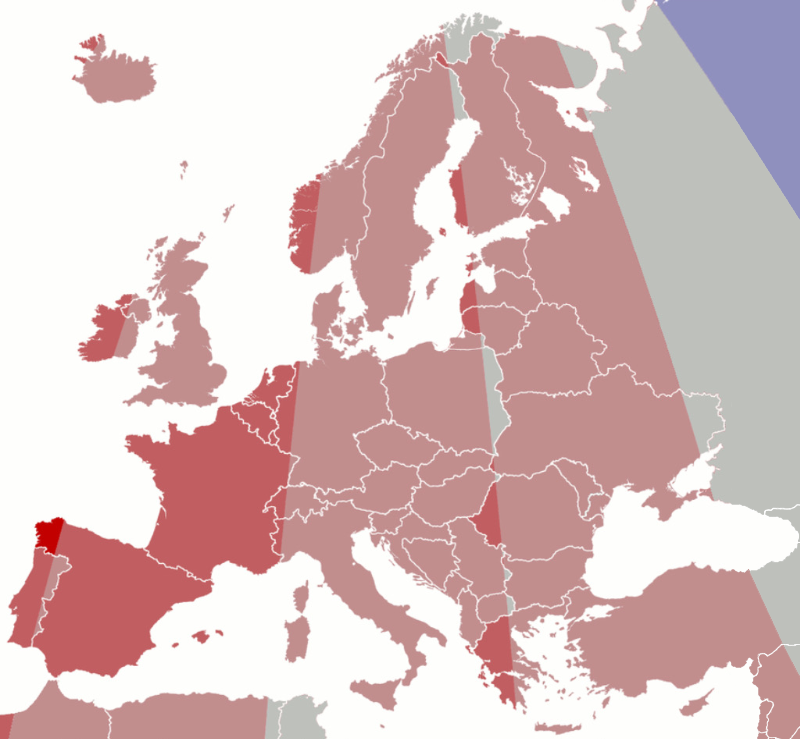
European summer

Since legal, political, social and economic criteria, in addition to physical or geographical criteria, are used in the drawing of time zones, actual time zones do not precisely adhere to meridian lines. The UTC+00:00 time zone, were it determined purely by longitude, would consist of the area between meridians 7°30′W and 7°30′E. However, in much of Western and Central Europe, despite lying between those two meridians, UTC+01:00 is used; similarly, there are European areas that use UTC, even though their physical time zone is UTC−01:00 (e.g. most of Portugal), or UTC−02:00 (the westernmost part of Iceland). Because the UTC+00:00 time zone in Europe is at its western edge, Lowestoft in the United Kingdom, at only 1°45′E, is the easternmost settlement in Europe in which UTC+00:00 is applied.

=== Countries and areas west of 22°30′W ("physical" UTC−02:00) that use UTC+00:00 ===
- The westernmost part of Iceland, including the northwest peninsula (the Westfjords) and its main town of Ísafjörður, which is west of 22°30′W, uses UTC+00:00. Bjargtangar, Iceland is the westernmost point in which UTC is applied.

=== Countries and areas west of 7°30′W ("physical" UTC−01:00) that use UTC+00:00 ===
==== In Europe ====
- Canary Islands (Spain)
- Most of Portugal, including Lisbon, Porto, Braga, Aveiro, and Coimbra. (Only the easternmost part, including cities such as Bragança and Guarda, lies east of 7°30′W.) Madeira, at 17°W even further west, also employs UTC+00:00.
- The western half of Ireland, including the cities of Cork, Limerick, and Galway
- Westernmost tip of Northern Ireland, including the county town of County Fermanagh, Enniskillen
- Extreme westerly portion of the Outer Hebrides, in the west of Scotland; for instance, Vatersay, an inhabited island and the westernmost settlement of Great Britain, lies at 7°54′W. If uninhabited islands or rocks are taken into account St Kilda, west of the Outer Hebrides, at 8°58′W, and Rockall, at 13°41′W, should be included.
- Westernmost island of the Faroe Islands (autonomous region of Denmark), Mykines
- Most of Iceland, including Reykjavík
- Northeastern part of Greenland, including Danmarkshavn

==== In Africa ====
- Liberia
- Sierra Leone
- Guinea
- Guinea-Bissau
- Senegal
- The Gambia
- Sahrawi Arab Democratic Republic (disputed territory)
- Most of Mauritania
- Southwesternmost part of Mali
- The very westernmost part of Ivory Coast

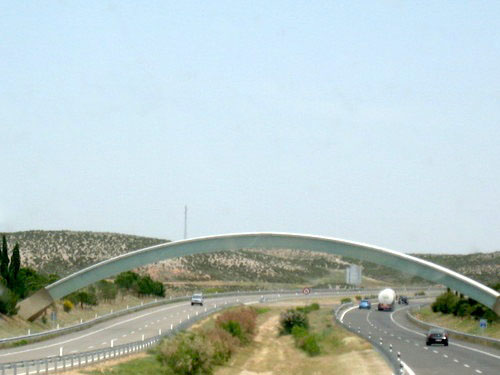
This arch that stretches over a highway indicates the IERS Reference Meridian (0°) in Spain.

== Countries that use UTC+01:00 as the basis for standard time although local solar time would suggest UTC+00:00 ==
=== In Europe ===
- Spain (except for the Canary Islands, which use UTC+00:00). Much of Galicia (and far western fringes of Extremadura and Andalusia) lie west of 7°30′W ("physical" UTC−01:00), whereas there is no Spanish territory that even approaches 7°30′E (the boundary of "physical" UTC+01:00). Spain's time is the direct result of Francisco Franco's presidential order (published in Boletín Oficial del Estado of 8 March 1940) abandoning Greenwich Mean Time and advancing clocks one hour, effective from 23:00 on 16 March 1940. This is an excellent example of political criteria used in the drawing of time zones: the time change was passed "in consideration of the convenience from the national time marching in step according to that of other European countries". The presidential order (most likely enacted to be in synchrony with Nazi Germany and Fascist Italy, with which the Franco regime was unofficially allied) included in its 5th article a provision for its future phase out, which never took place. Due to this political decision, Spain is two hours ahead of its local mean time during the summer, one hour ahead in winter.
- Andorra
- Belgium
- Most of France, including the cities of Paris, Marseille and Lyon. Only small parts of Alsace, Lorraine and Provence, and Corsica are east of 7°30′E ("physical" UTC+1).
- Ireland (Irish Standard Time is used in summer, GMT in winter: this is the reverse of the usual convention, but provides the same end results. See Time in the Republic of Ireland).
- Luxembourg
- Monaco
- Netherlands
- Gibraltar (United Kingdom)
- The very westernmost part of Germany
- Westernmost part of Switzerland
- The very northwesternmost part of Italy
- Bouvet Island and southwesternmost part of Norway

=== In Africa ===
- Benin
- Annobón Island (Equatorial Guinea)
- Western part of Niger
- Western part of Nigeria, including Lagos
- Most of Algeria, including Algiers

== See also ==
- Coordinated Universal Time (UTC), the basis for the world's civil time.
