= List of national parks of Iceland =

National parks of Iceland:

National parks (3)

Former national parks (2)

Since 2008, Iceland has three national parks. Prior to 2008 there were four national parks in Iceland; in that year Jökulsárgljúfur and Skaftafell were merged and incorporated into Vatnajökull National Park.

Vatnajökull National and Snæfellsjökull National Park are supervised by the Ministry for the Environment and Natural Resources, Þingvellir National Park is supervised by the Ministry for the Prime Minister.

== List of national parks of Iceland ==
This along with * indicates that the national park is part of a World Heritage Site

Name	Photo	Location	Established	Area
Snæfellsjökull		West Iceland	2001	170 km^{2} (66 sq mi)
Vatnajökull*		South-East Iceland	2008	13,952 km^{2} (5,387 sq mi)
Þingvellir*		South Iceland	1930 by laws set in 1928	

=== Former national parks ===
- * Were taken into Vatnajökull National Park in 2008.

Name	Photo	Location	Established	Area
Jökulsárgljúfur*		North Iceland	1973	
Skaftafell*		South Iceland	1967	4,807 km^{2} (1,856 sq mi)
