= Rifstangi =

Peninsula in northeast Iceland

Coordinates: 66.53649°N 16.1948°W

The Rifstangi ([ˈrɪfsˌtʰauɲcɪ]) is a small peninsula in northeast Iceland, located on the larger Melrakkaslétta [ˈmɛlˌrahkaˌstljɛhta] peninsula. It is the northernmost tip of mainland Iceland.

In 2015, it recorded the shortest day in Iceland at 2 hours 14 minutes.

== Pictures ==
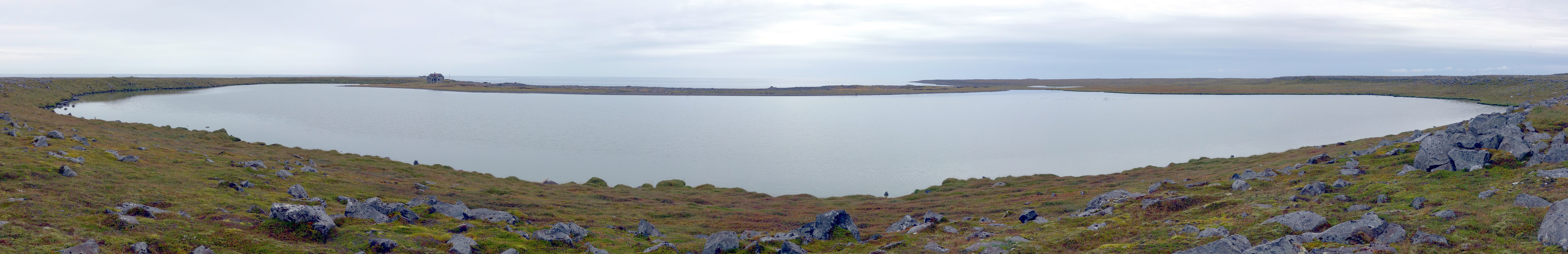
The lake Kottjarnir on Rifstangi

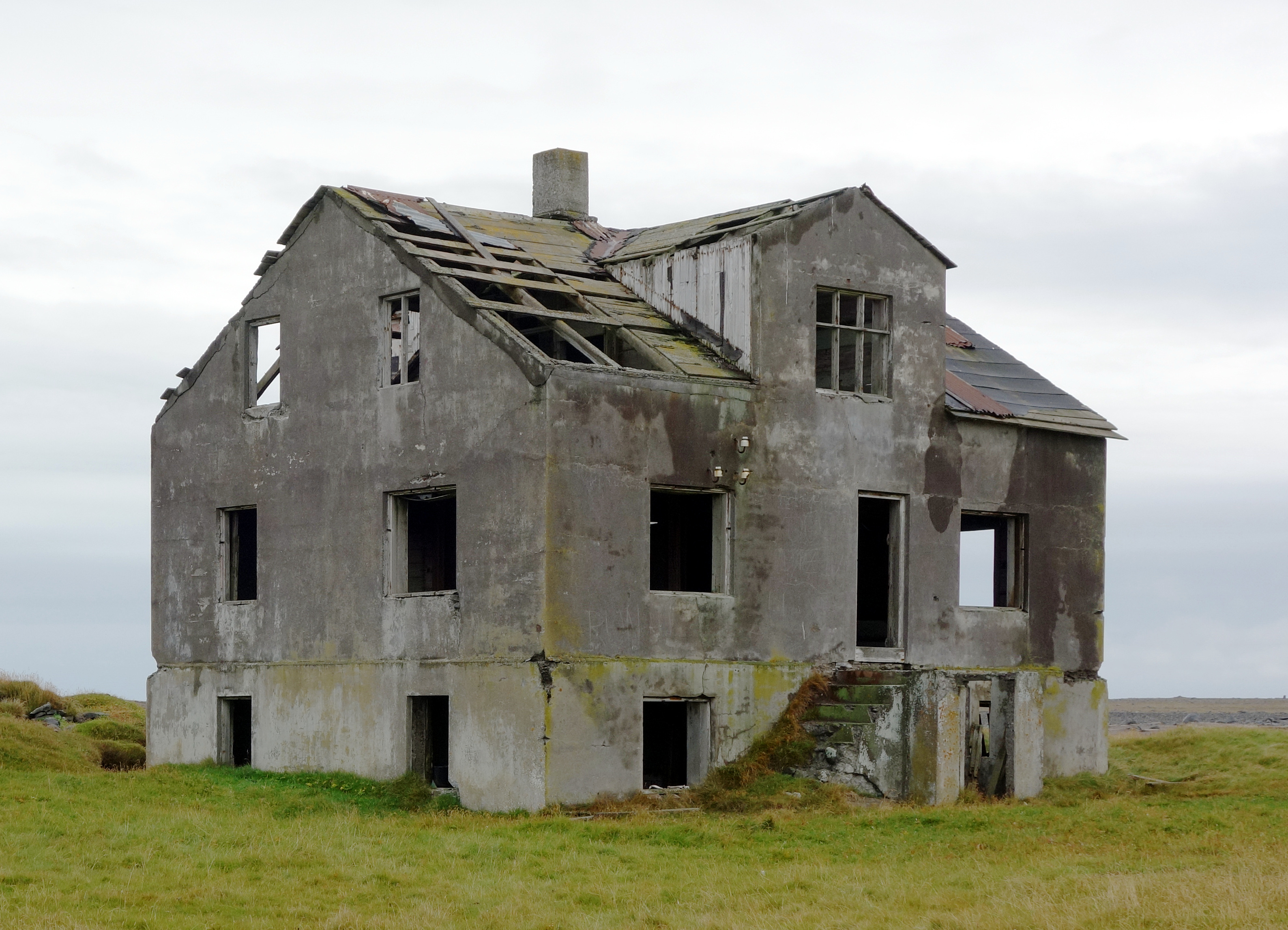
An abandoned house on Rifstangi
