= Bjargtangar =

Westernmost point of Iceland

Coordinates: 65°30′N 24°32′W

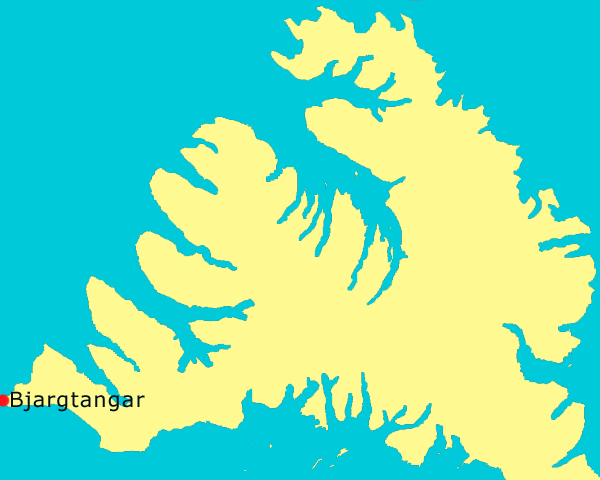
The location of Bjargtangar in Vestfirðir

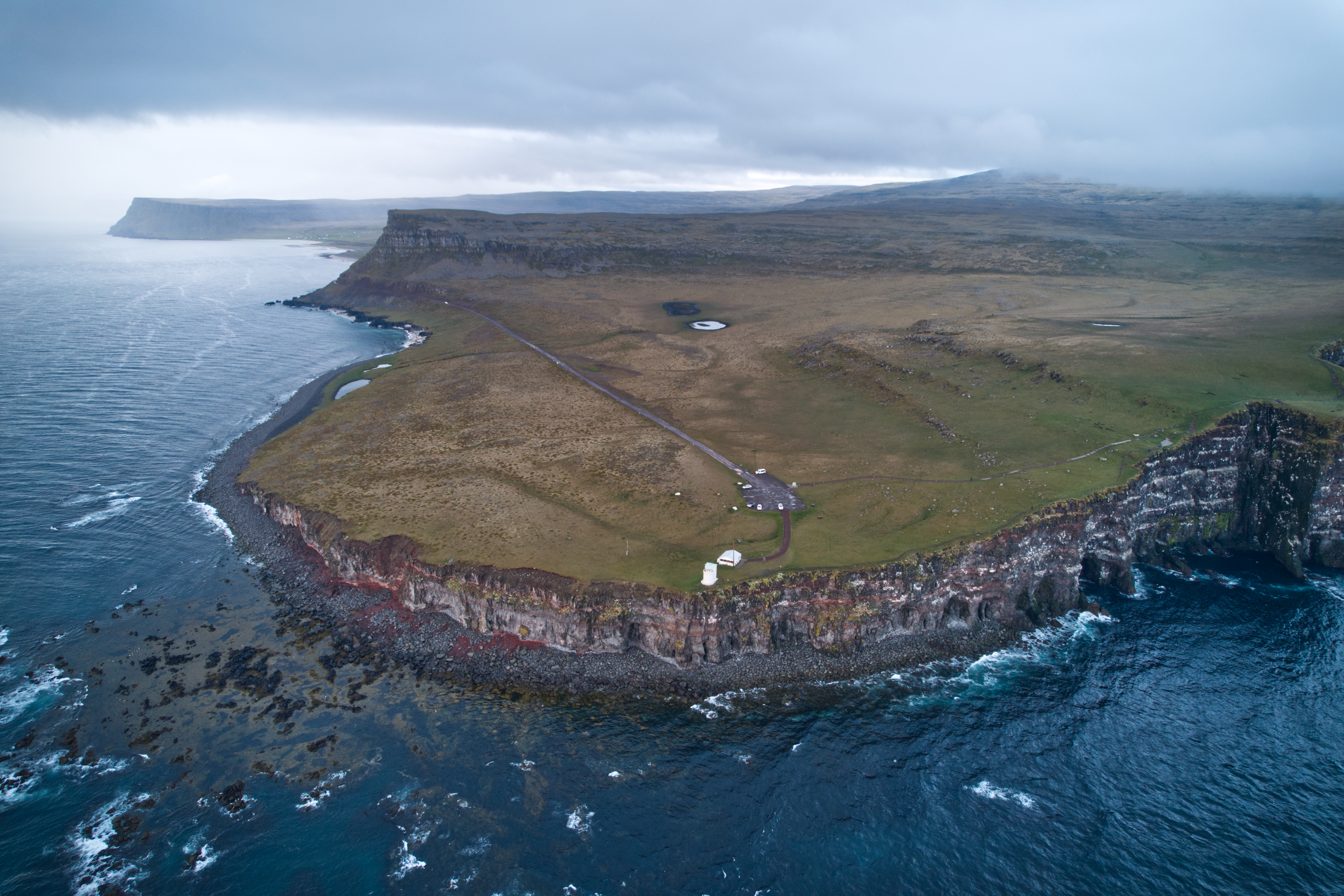
Bjargtangar, westernmost point of Europe

Bjargtangar (Icelandic pronunciation: [ˈpjarkˌtʰauŋkar̥], regionally also [-ˌtʰaŋkar̥]) is the westernmost point of Iceland and is considered the westernmost point of Europe outside the mid-Atlantic archipelago of Azores (which are not classified as remote islands). It is the westernmost point in the Greenwich Mean Time (GMT) time zone.

== See also ==
- Bjargtangar Lighthouse
- Látrabjarg
