= Skjaldbreiður =

Volcano in Iceland

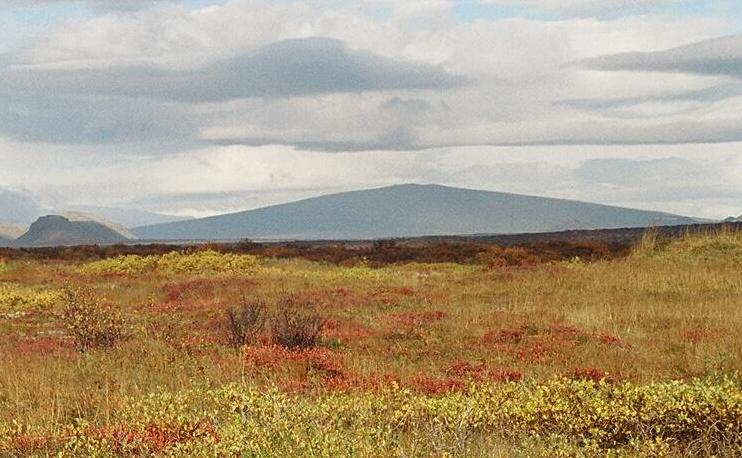
- Skjaldbreiður as seen from Þingvellir

Highest point
- Elevation: 1,066 m (3,497 ft)
- Coordinates: 64°24′36″N 20°45′44″W

Naming
- English translation: broad shield
- Language of name: Icelandic

Geography
- Location within Iceland
- Location: Iceland

Geology
- Rock age: 9,500 years
- Mountain type: shield volcano
- Selected geological features near the Skjaldbreiður shield volcano.(red outline). Light violet shading shows the current surface area of the Skjaldbreiður lava flows. Key: calderas; central volcanoes; fissure swarms; subglacial terrain above 1,100 m (3,600 ft); seismically active areas.; Clicking on the image enlarges to full window and enables mouse-over with more detail.

Skjaldbreiður (Icelandic pronunciation: [ˈscaltˌpreiːðʏr̥], "broad shield") is an Icelandic lava shield formed in an eruption series roughly 9,500 years ago. The extensive lava fields produced by this eruption flowed southwards and formed the basin of Þingvallavatn, Iceland's largest lake, and Þingvellir, the "Parliament Plains", where the Icelandic national assembly, the Alþing, was founded in 930.

The volcano summit is at 1,066 m (3,497 ft), and its crater measures roughly 300 m (980 ft) in diameter. The Skjaldbreiður lava shield covers 170 km^{2} (66 sq mi) with a volume of about 13 km^{3} (3.1 cu mi). and is sometimes considered a separate southern part of the Oddnýjarhnjúkur-Langjökull volcanic system. In this context, its most recent eruption was 3,600 years ago, with the earliest eruption after the last ice age 10,200 years ago. There are at least three lava units deposited between 6,000 and 9,000 years BP.

Straddling the Mid-Atlantic Ridge, the lava fields from Skjaldbreiður have been torn and twisted over the millennia, forming a multitude of fissures and rifts inside the Þingvellir National Park, the best known of which are Silfra, Almannagjá [ˈalˌmanːaˌcauː], Hrafnagjá [ˈr̥apnaˌcauː] and Flosagjá [ˈflɔːsaˌcauː].

== Gallery ==
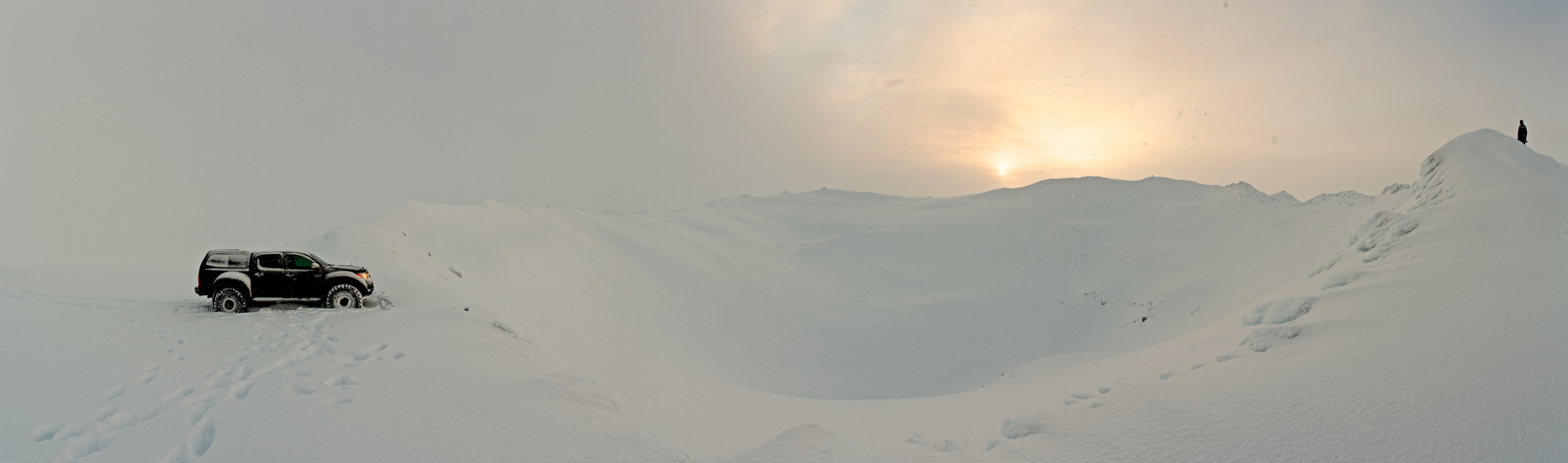
Skjaldbreiður crater in snow.
