= RNF =

RNF may refer to:

- Aircraft Accident Investigation Board (Iceland) (Rannsóknarnefnd flugslysa)
- Ring-sum normal form, in Boolean algebra
- Rassemblement National Français ('French National Rally'), a French political party 1954–1957
- Royal Northumberland Fusiliers, former British army regiment
