= Silfra =

Water-filled rift in Iceland between the North American and Eurasian tectonic plates

Coordinates: 64.254323°N 21.117958°W

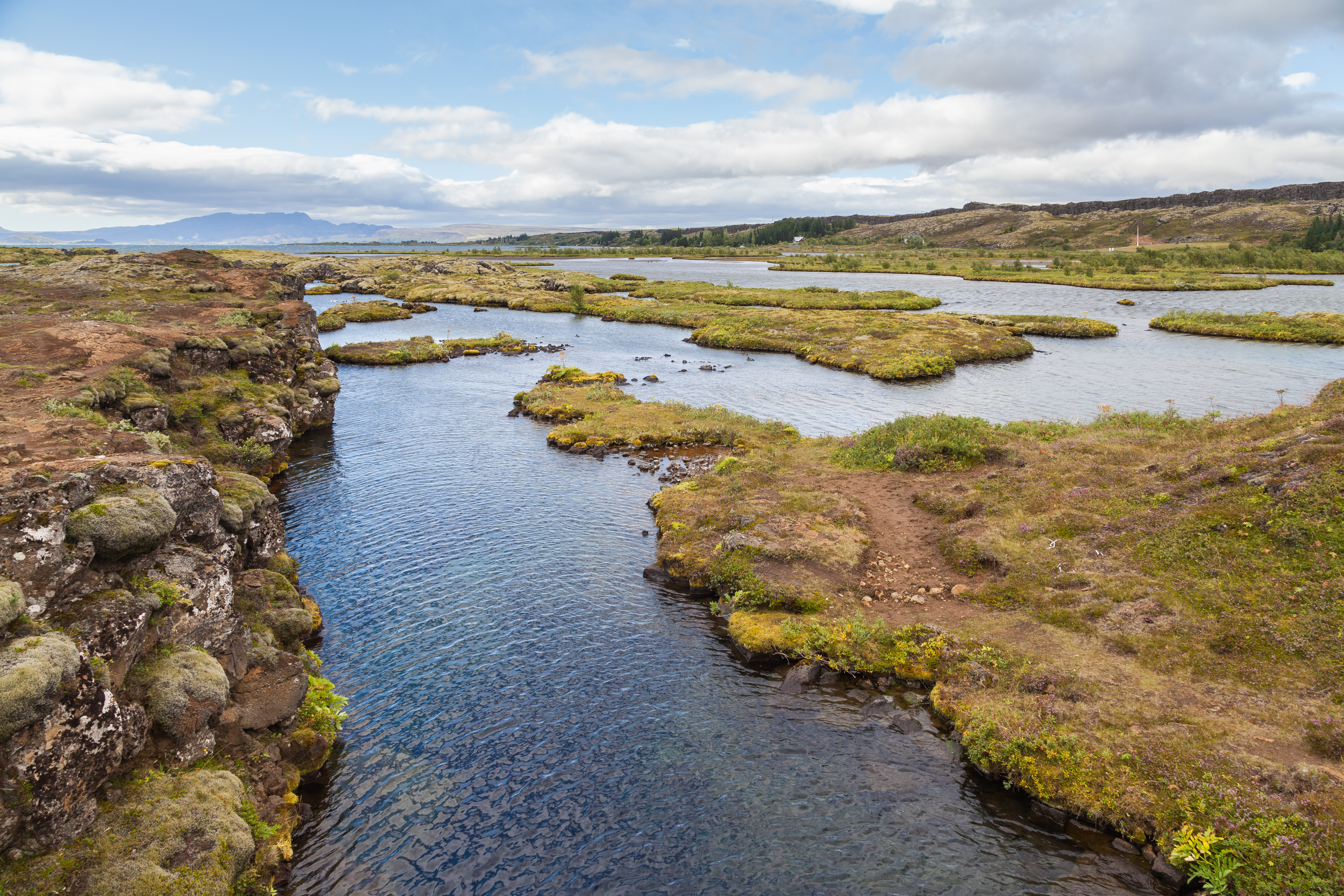
Silfra fissure

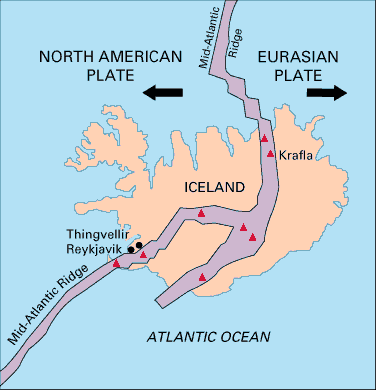
The Mid-Atlantic Ridge passing through Þingvellir

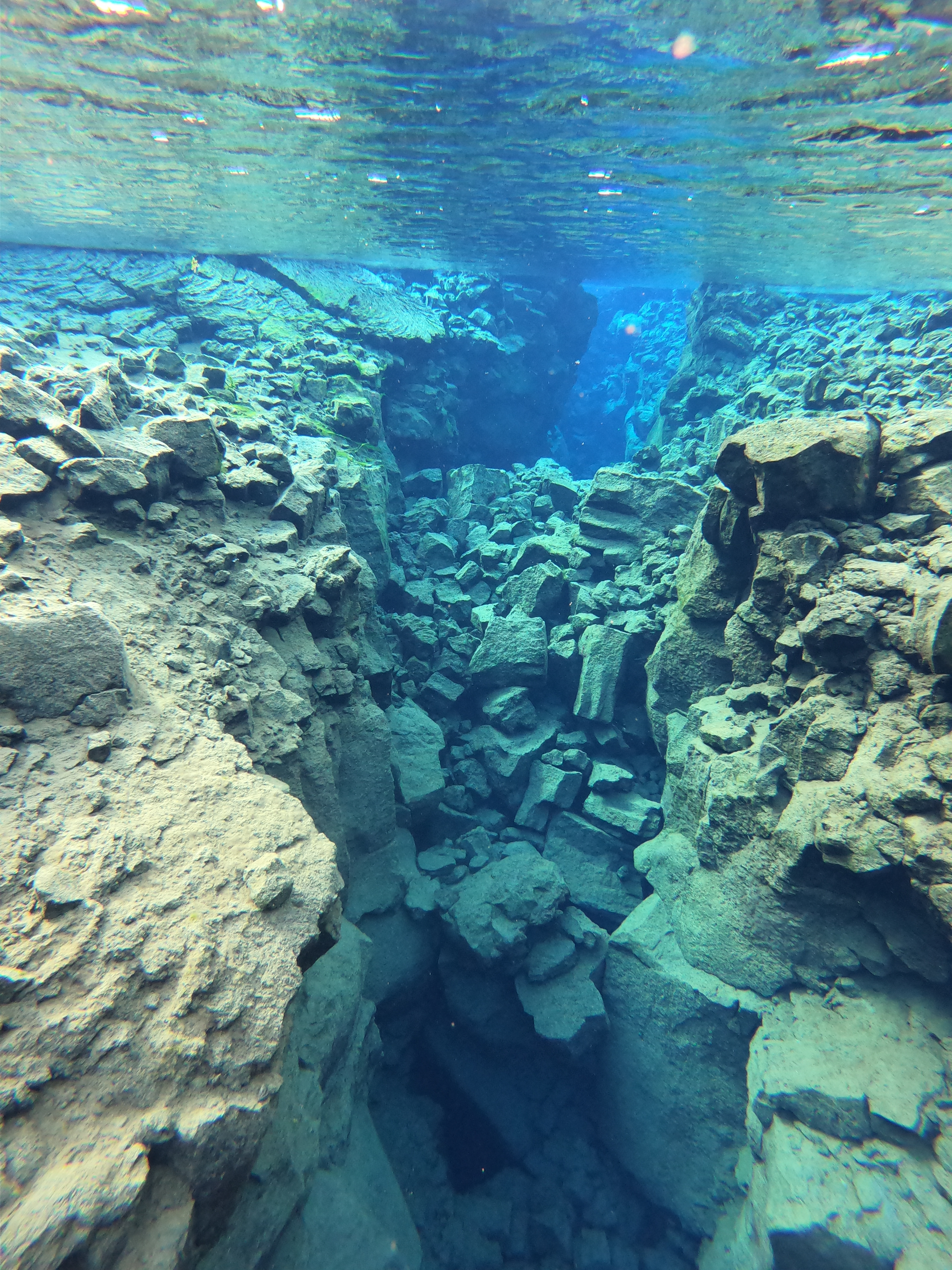
Rocks and boulders that have piled up in the fissure due to earthquakes.

Silfra (Icelandic pronunciation: [ˈsɪl(v)ra]) is a rift formed in the Mid-Atlantic Ridge – the divergent tectonic boundary between the North American and Eurasian plates – and is located in the Þingvallavatn Lake in the Þingvellir National Park in Iceland.

== Formation ==
Silfra lies in the Þingvellir valley and within the Þingvellir National Park. The valley, and Silfra itself, were formed by the divergent tectonic drift of the Eurasian and North American plates. The plates drift about 2 cm (0.79 in) farther apart every year, building up tension between the plates and the earth mass above. This tension is relieved through periodic major earthquakes at approximately ten-year intervals, which have caused cracks and fissures to form in Þingvellir valley; Silfra lies at the rim of the Þingvallavatn Lake and is one of the largest and deepest of these fissures. The Silfra fissure intercepts a major aquifer, which feeds multiple springs at its base. Boulders and rocks falling into the widening cracks have formed caves within the fissures.

== History ==
Þingvellir (Thingvellir) National Park is a UNESCO world heritage area and home to Iceland's first parliamentary assembly called Althingi. The initial two-week meeting in the month of June in 930 CE marked Iceland's birth. The sessions continued until the year 1798 when it was then replaced by the High Court until it was reinstated about 50 years later. Ruins of the ancient stone "booths" are still visible and visitors can walk between two tectonic plates. Visitors can look out from the uplifted tectonic ridgeline and see the numerous fissures varying in size as well as the Silfra fissure.

== Hydrology ==
Silfra is a spring fed by groundwater originating as meltwater from Langjökull, Iceland's second largest glacier, about fifty kilometres north of the Þingvallavatn Lake. In the distant past, this Langjökull meltwater ran through a river directly and unimpeded into the Þingvallavatn Lake. This river was blocked a few thousand years ago by lava flows from the Skjaldbreiður volcano causing the meltwater to pond and seep underground into the porous lava rock to form an aquifer. This water then percolates through the aquifer for thirty to a hundred years before emerging from the fissure springs in the Þingvallavatn Lake fifty kilometres to the south. The emerging, highly filtered groundwater is exceptionally clear and potable.

== Scuba diving ==
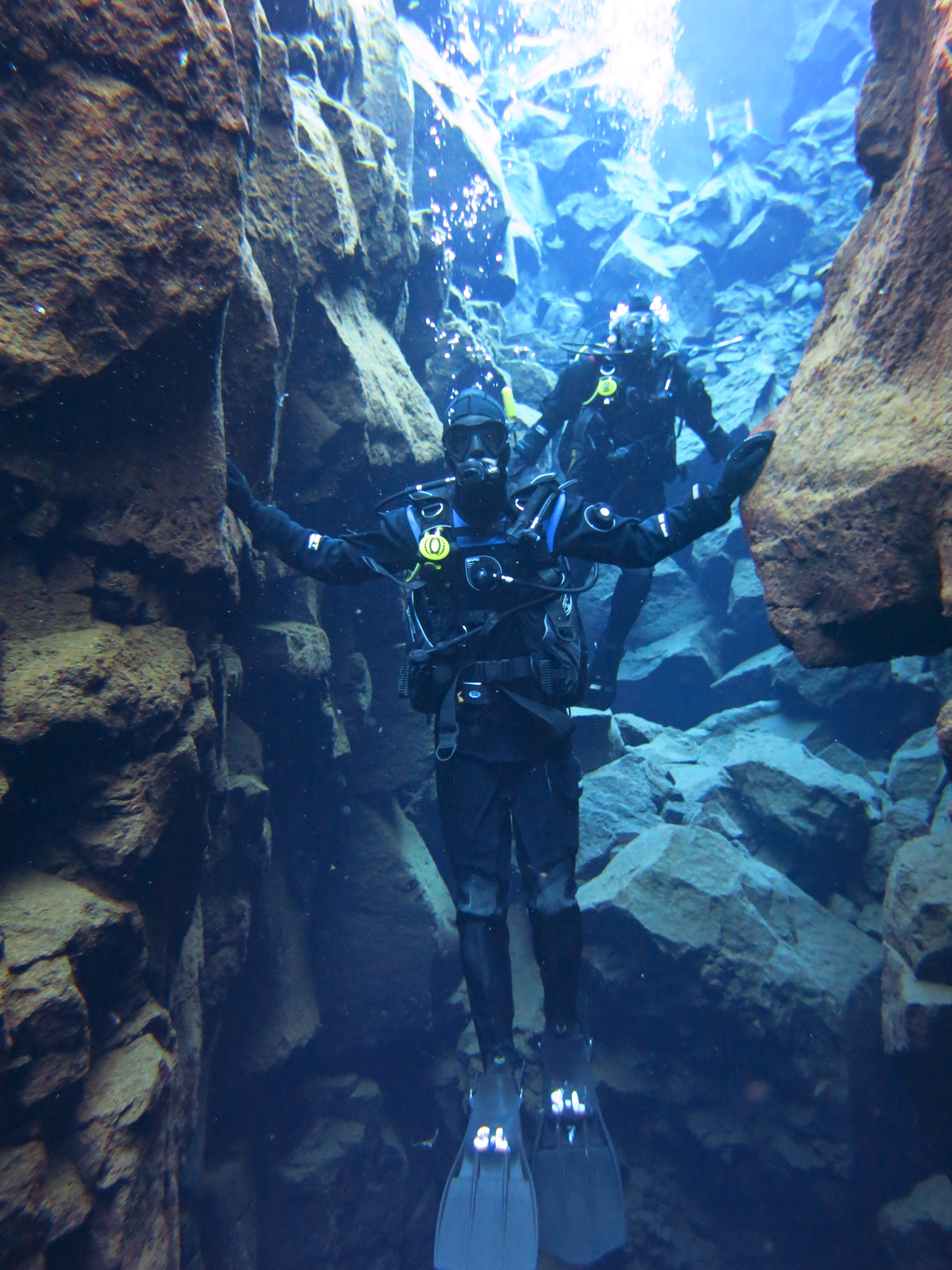
Scuba divers in one of the widening, parallel rifts in the fissure.

Scuba diving and snorkeling in Silfra are popular because of its clear water and location within the continental rift. Silfra is about a 45 to 60-minute drive east of Iceland's capital Reykjavik. There are three main dive sites: Silfra Hall, Silfra Cathedral, and Silfra Lagoon. The Silfra Hall consists of multiple cave systems underwater with a maximum depth of about 45 metres (148 ft).The Cathedral is a 100 metres (330 ft) long fissure with visibility almost from end to end. Shallow at the entry points and the ends of the fissure, Silfra descends to a maximum depth of 63 metres (207 ft) but diving to this depth is seldom done as it requires technical diving skills. To get to the main part of Silfra from the caves, divers must go down through the "toilet" headfirst which is a narrow tunnel to a depth of 16 metres (52 ft). It is the only opening from the Silfra cave to the Silfra crack for the water to go through, thus creating a strong current that flushes every diver straight down. Although this practice is no longer allowed due to the instability of the tunnel, it still holds importance because it is the entrance to the cave. Towards the end of the fissure, it opens up to a shallow lagoon with the most visibility covered in green algae. It is about 120 metres (390 ft) long and is used as the exit point for divers and snorkelers. The water temperature is between 2–4 °C (36–39 °F) but can be comfortably dived using a dry suit.

== Marine life ==
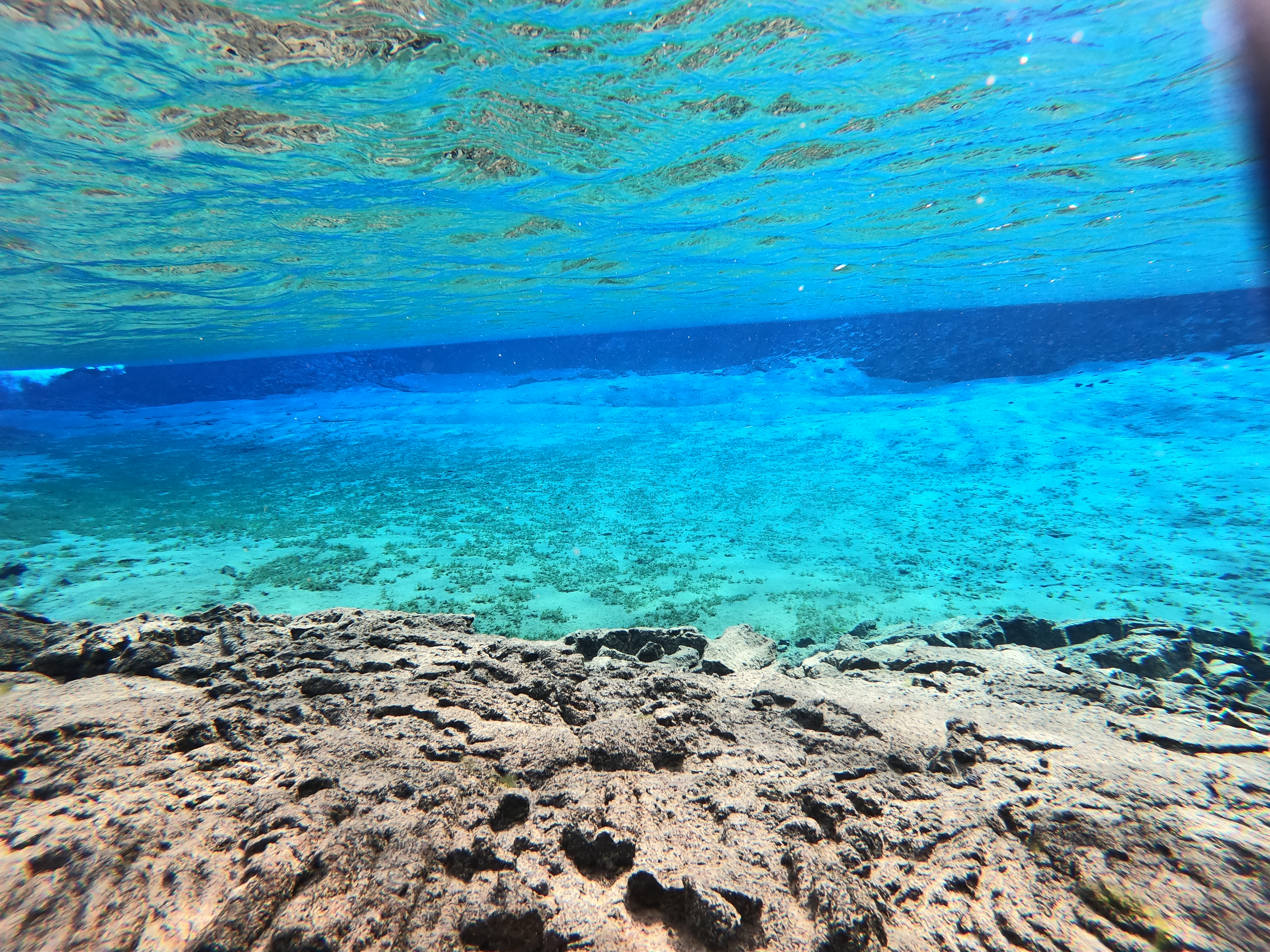
Silfra Lagoon

Although aquatic life is scarce in the extremely cold water temperatures, it is a habitat for some such as the amphipod called Crymostygius thingvallensis found only in Thingvellir Lake and the surrounding fissures. A fish species called the Arctic Char also occasionally venture into Silfra during mating season in August and September. However, the only fish life that lives in the fissure year-round is the Dwarf Char, a subspecies of the Arctic Char. They are rarely seen because they live in the deeper and darker recesses of the fissure.

== See also ==
- Geography of Iceland
- List of lakes of Iceland
- Sport in Iceland
