= 2022 Þingvallavatn plane crash =

Aviation accident involving a Cessna 172

Coordinates: 64.1316°N 21.0759°W

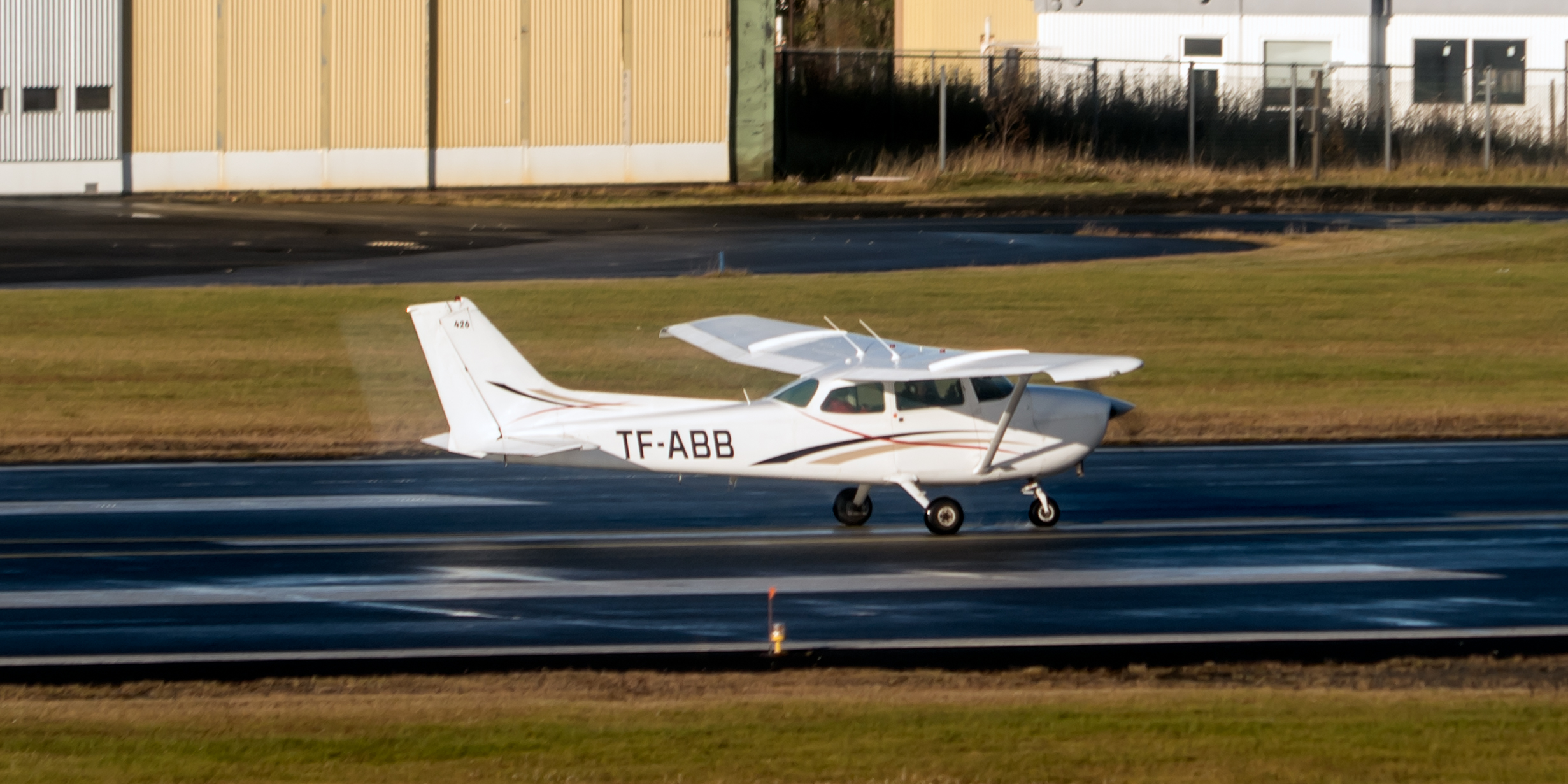
- TF-ABB, the aircraft involved, seen in 2021.

Accident
- Date: 3 February 2022
- Summary: Water landing, human factors as a contributory factor.
- Site: Ölfusvatnsvík, Þingvallavatn

Aircraft
- Aircraft type: Cessna 172N
- Operator: Volcano Air ehf.
- Registration: TF-ABB
- Flight origin: Reykjavík Airport
- Destination: Reykjavík Airport
- Occupants: 4
- Passengers: 3
- Crew: 1
- Fatalities: 4
- Survivors: 0

2022 Þingvallavatn plane crash is an aviation accident which occurred on 3 February 2022 when a Cessna 172N (TF-ABB) crash-landed into the partly-frozen lake of Þingvallavatn and sank during a sightseeing flight from Reykjavík Airport. All four people on board died. They were Icelandic pilot Haraldur Diego, skateboarder and YouTuber Josh Neuman, Nicola Bellavia and Tim Alings. The disappearance of the plane led to the biggest search and rescue operation for a missing plane in Iceland in over 40 years.

== The accident and rescue operations ==
The 1977 Cessna 172N registered TF-ABB took off from Reykjavík Airport at 10:38 on the morning of 3 February 2022. The flight plan indicated a two-hour sightseeing flight. Footage from security cameras from summerhouses near Þingvallavatn showed the plane about an hour later doing what appeared to be an attempted landing or touch-and-go on the southern part of Þingvallavatn lake which was at the time covered in thin ice. The plane hit the ice and sank. No distress call came from the plane and the plane's emergency transmitter did not send any messages. 112, the emergency line, did however receive a few-second call at 11:51 which later turned out to be from the phone of one of the passengers. When the plane did not arrive back at Reykjavík Airport at the right time, the plane was reported missing.

The search operation that followed was the biggest of a missing plane in Iceland in over 40 years or ever since TF-ROM went missing in May 1981. Over 1,000 members of the Icelandic Search and Rescue teams, along with an Icelandic Coast Guard helicopter and a Danish Air Force plane took part in the search. The plane was found on 5 February at a depth of 48 meters and 800 meters away from land at the bottom of Ölfusvatnsvík [ˈœlvʏsˌvasːˌviːk] in the southern part of the Þingvallavatn lake, but there was no sight of the men inside the plane. On 6 February, a remote-controlled submarine found the bodies of all four men in a 300-meter radius around the plane. It was believed that the men escaped from the plane, but had succumbed to the ice-cold water.

Bad weather delayed continued operations for a few days. An extensive recovery operation was commenced on 10 February including the Icelandic Police and their special unit, the fire brigade, the coast guard, and search and rescue teams to retrieve the bodies and the plane. The frozen lake initially prevented rescue boats from accessing the site, but were eventually able to break through and the four bodies of the men were retrieved with a remote-controlled submarine with a grip arm. On 11 February, attempts to recover the aircraft out of the water were postponed due to worsening conditions in the water and the dangers it posed for the divers. After weather conditions improved and the ice had melted, the plane was finally retrieved out of the water on 22 April.

== Cause ==
In the preliminary report from the Safety Investigation Authority of Iceland (Icelandic: Rannsóknarnefnd Samgönguslysa) on the accident it was reported that the plane flew for around 7 seconds at a very low altitude over the water before it landed in it.

In May 2024, the Safety Investigation Authority (SIA) published its findings and attributed the accident to an intentional or unintentional landing on the frozen lake with human factors considered a contributory factor. The pilot was known to have previously landed on icy waters where he previously inspected conditions. The SIA found no evidence that he had inspected the conditions at Þingvallavatn beforehand and thus could not conclude whether the landing was intentional or not. Regardless, as soon as the plane touched the ice, the surface collapsed and the plane landed in the water and sank within two minutes. The impact of crash was not enough to activate the emergency transmitter. Despite the fact that the occupants managed to escape the plane after impact, it was concluded that due to the weather conditions that they had no chance of reaching the lake shore.

== Aftermath ==
In the aftermath of the investigation, the Safety Investigation Authority directed the Icelandic Transport Authority to implement the installation of new ADS-B transmitters in all crewed aircraft flying in Icelandic airspace. It furthermore directed the Icelandic Coast Guard to establish a response plan with Coordination Center of the Department of Civil Protection and Emergency Management regarding the organization, implementation and responsibility of a search for a missing aircraft.

== Victims ==
The pilot was Haraldur Diego, chairman of the Aircraft Owners and Pilots Association (AOPA) of Iceland and a known figure in airplane photography tours in Iceland. The three passengers were from a group of ten people that were present in Iceland to participate in an advertising campaign for the Belgian clothing line Suspicious Antwerp. Among the passengers was skateboarder and YouTuber Josh Neuman, along with Nicola Bellavia and Tim Alings.

On 12 April 2022, Haraldur's 50th birthday, a memorial service was held with candles being lit and floated on Þingvallavatn.
