= Öxará =

River in Iceland

Coordinates: 64°15′20″N 21°07′30″W

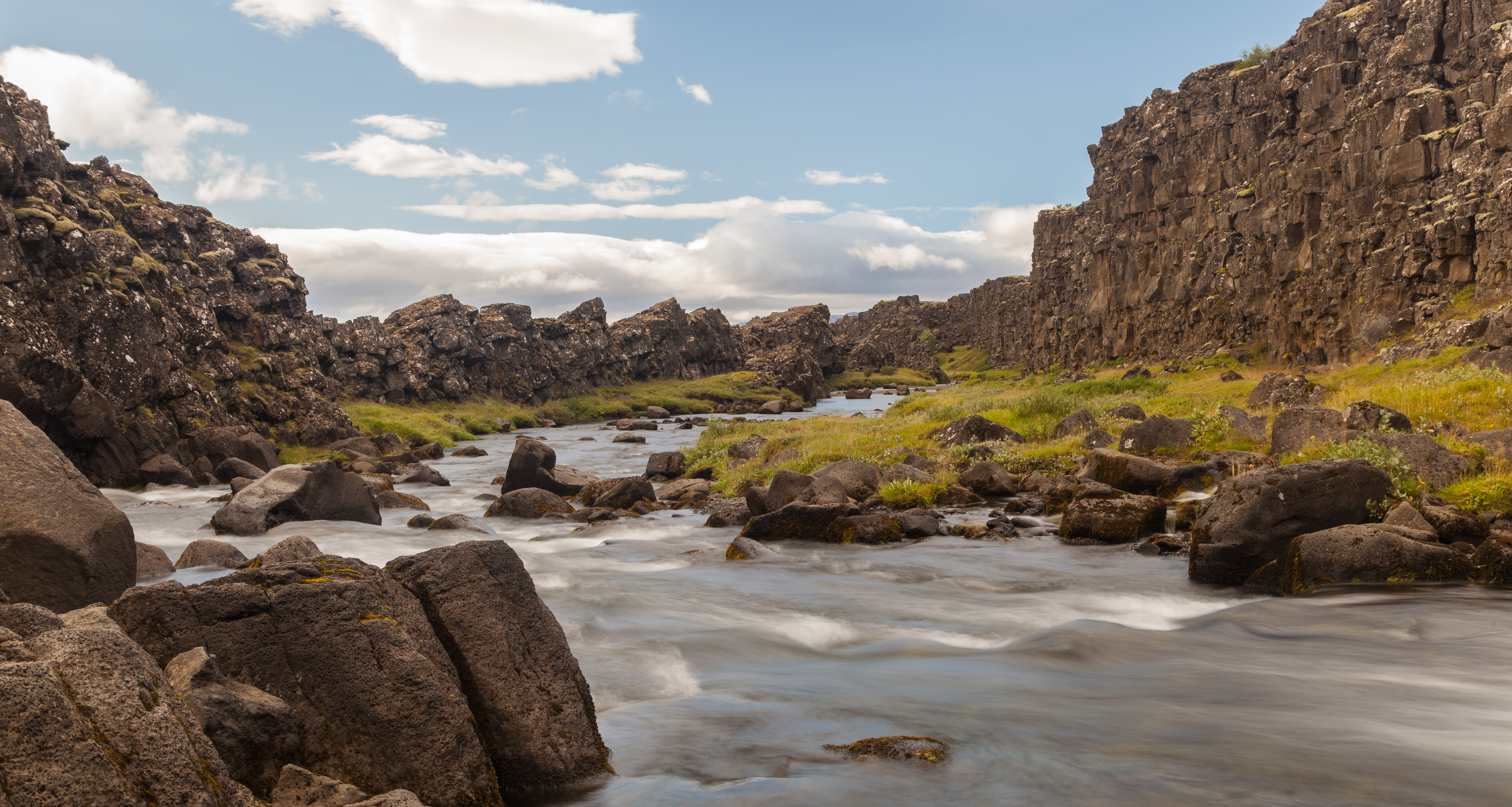
- The Öxarárfoss of the river Öxará

Location
- Country: Iceland

Physical characteristics
- Discharge
  - average: Öxarárfoss

Öxará (Icelandic pronunciation: [ˈœksarˌauː], "axe river") is a lake-to-lake river in Iceland in Þingvellir National Park, a tributary of Lake Þingvallavatn. It descends to the rift forming Öxarárfoss, a waterfall.

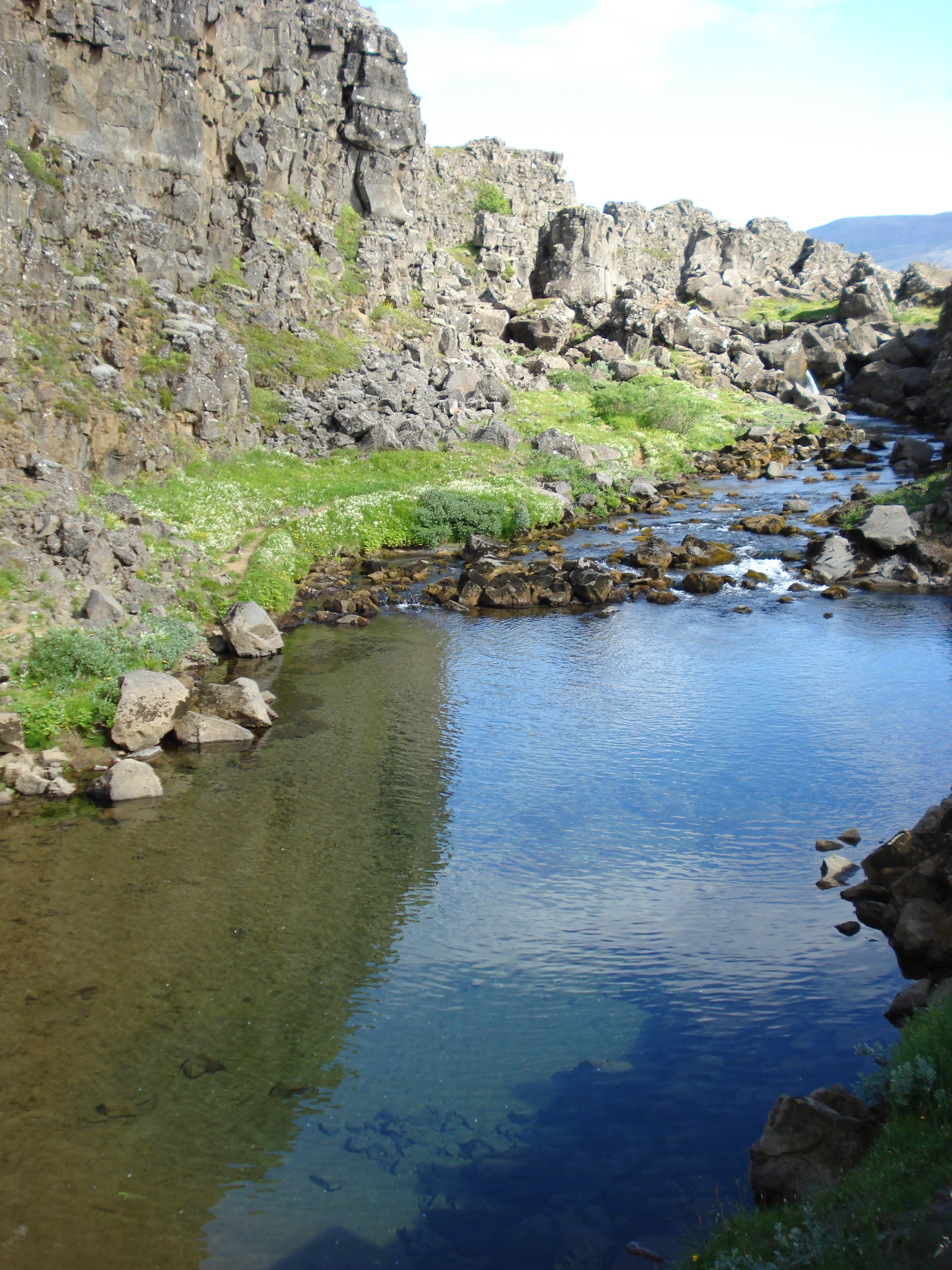
Öxará River, Thingvellir, Iceland

== See also ==
- List of rivers of Iceland
