= Þingvellir =

Site of Iceland's ancient parliament

Þingvellir National Park
- IUCN category II (national park)
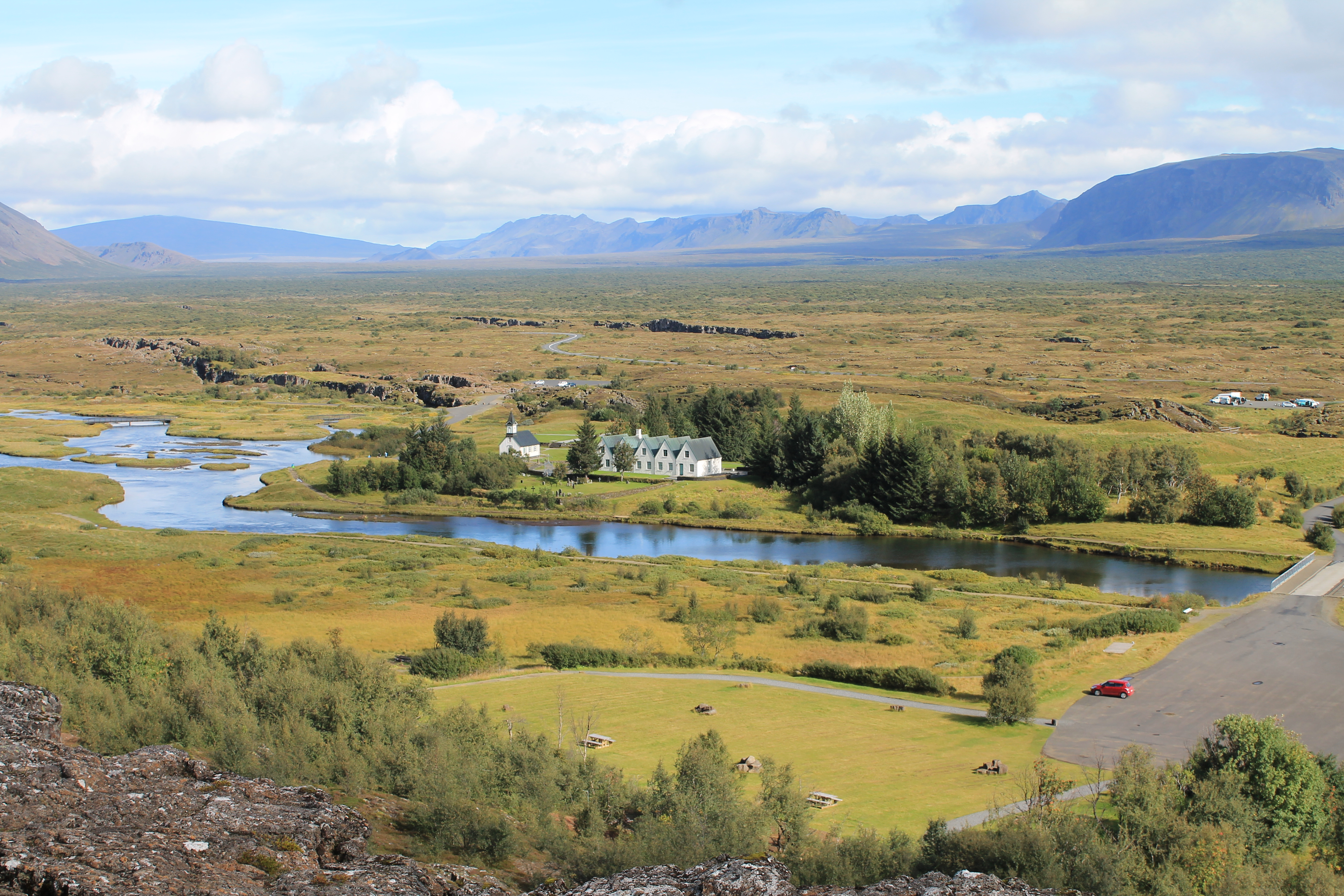
- Þingvellir seen from the information centre

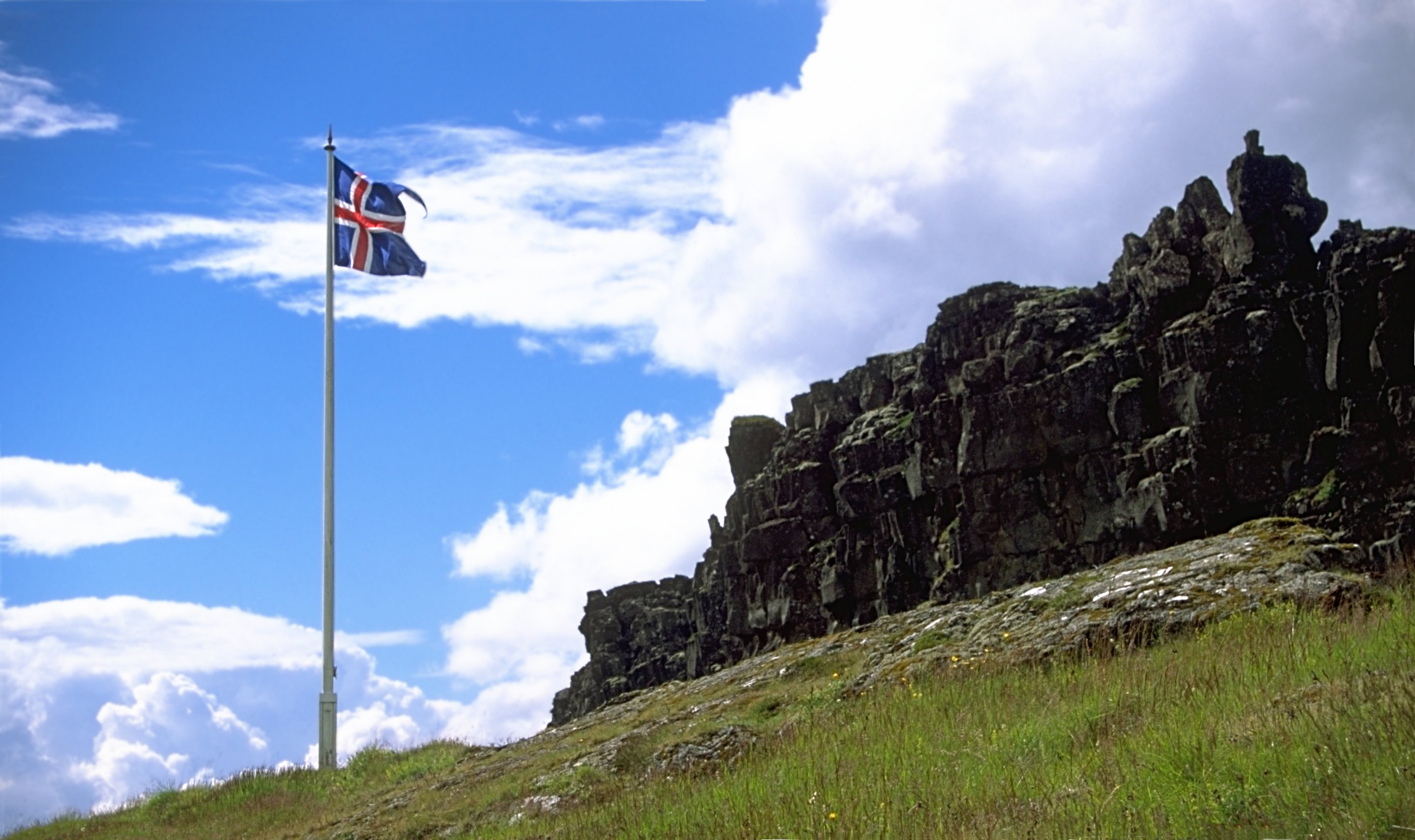
- Area: 9,270 ha (35.8 sq mi)
- Established: 1930
- Location within Iceland

UNESCO World Heritage Site
- Official name: Þingvellir National Park
- Location: Southern Region, Iceland
- Criteria: Cultural: (iii), (vi)
- Reference: 1152
- Inscription: 2004 (28th Session)
- Website: www.thingvellir.is/en
- Coordinates: 64°15′13.7″N 21°2′14.1″W

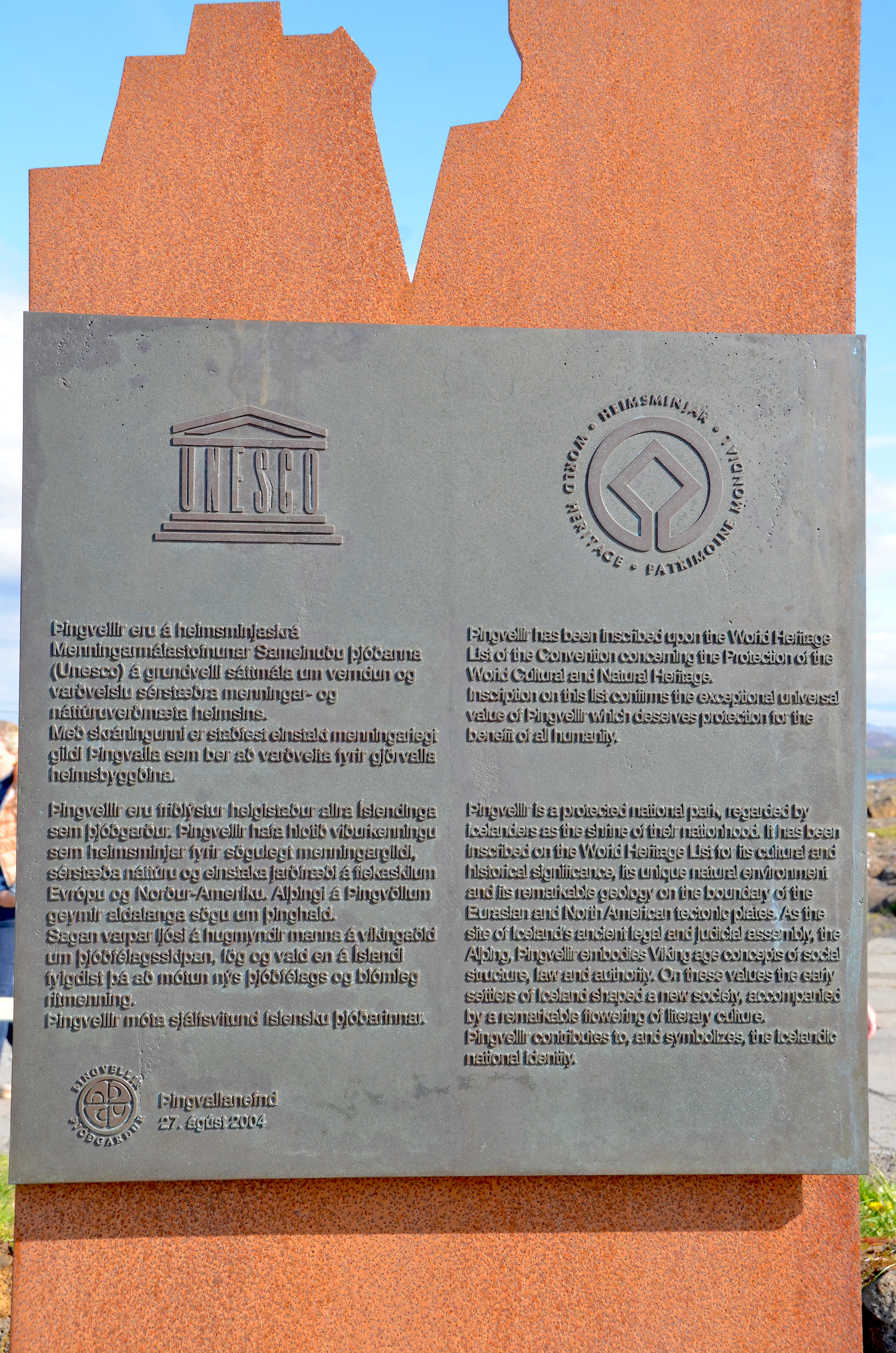
UNESCO World Heritage plaque

Þingvellir (Old Norse pronunciation: [ˈθɪŋgˌvɛlːɪr], Icelandic pronunciation: [ˈθiŋkˌvɛtlɪr̥], anglicised as Thingvellir (Note: The spelling Pingvellir is sometimes seen, although the letter "p" is unrelated to the letter "þ" (thorn), which is pronounced as "th".)) was the site of the Alþing, the annual parliament of Iceland from the year 930 until the last session held at Þingvellir in 1798. Since 1881, the parliament has been located within Alþingishúsið in Iceland's capital, Reykjavík.

Þingvellir is now a national park in the municipality of Bláskógabyggð in southwestern Iceland, about 40 km (25 miles) northeast of Reykjavík. Þingvellir is a site of historical, cultural, and geological significance, and is one of the most popular tourist destinations in Iceland. The park lies in a rift valley that marks the crest of the Mid-Atlantic Ridge and the boundary between the North American and Eurasian tectonic plates. To its south lies Þingvallavatn, the largest natural lake in Iceland.

Þingvellir National Park (þjóðgarðurinn á Þingvöllum [ˈθjouðˌkarðʏrɪn au ˈθiŋkˌvœtlʏm]) was founded in 1930, marking the 1000th anniversary of the Althing. The park was later expanded to protect the diverse and natural phenomena in the surrounding area and was designated as a World Heritage Site in 2004.

== Toponymy ==
The name Þingvellir is derived from the Old Norse Þingvǫllr (Old Norse pronunciation: [ˈθiŋɡˌwɔlːz̠]), from þing (“thing, assembly”) and vǫllr (“field”), meaning assembly fields. Compare the English thing and weald (“Thingweald”) from Anglo-Saxon þing and weald. The site takes its name from Alþing (Althing), the national parliament of Iceland, which was founded at Þingvellir in 930 and held its sessions there until 1798. A thing was a form of governing assembly found in Germanic societies, and a tradition that endures to this day in one form or another across Northern Europe.

Although the name Þingvellir is plural, the older form Þingvǫllr is singular, and the modern singular form Þingvöllur can still be heard.

The name is most commonly anglicised as Thingvellir, and might appear as Tingvellir, Thingvalla or Tingvalla in other languages. The spelling Pingvellir is also seen, although the letter “p” does not correspond to the letter “þ” (thorn), which is pronounced [θ], like the th in thirst.

Dingwall and Tingwall in Scotland, Thingwall in England, Tynwald on the Isle of Man, Dinklage in Germany, and Tingvoll in Norway bear names of the same root and meaning.

== History ==
Þingvellir became a national park as a result of legislation passed in 1928 to protect the remains of the parliament site, thus creating the first national park in Iceland. The park was decreed "a protected national shrine for all Icelanders, the perpetual property of the Icelandic nation under the preservation of parliament, never to be sold or mortgaged".

=== Founding of Iceland's parliament ===
According to the Book of Settlements (Landnámabók), the settlement of Iceland began in 874, when the Norwegian chieftain Ingólfr Arnarson became the first permanent Norwegian settler on the island. Over the next centuries, people of Norse and Celtic origin settled in Iceland. Early on, district assemblies were formed, but as the population grew, there was a need for a general assembly. The descendants of Ingólfur who dominated the region of southwest Iceland had become the most powerful family in the country, and other chieftains felt a need for a general assembly to limit their power.

Grímur Geitskör was allotted the role of rallying support and finding a suitable location for the assembly. At about the same time, the owner of Bláskógar (the contemporary name for the Þingvellir region) was found guilty of murder. His land was declared public, and then obligated to be used for assembly proceedings, and the building of temporary dwellings, and the forest to be used for kindling and the grazing of horses. The Þingvellir area was chosen for this reason and its accessibility to the most populous regions of the north, south, and west. The longest journey a goði (chieftain) had to travel was 17 days, from the easternmost part of the country where mountains and glacial rivers proved bothersome obstacles.

The foundation of the Icelandic parliament is said to be the founding of the nation of Iceland, and the first parliamentary proceedings in the summer of 930 laid the ground for a common cultural heritage and national identity. Þingvellir played a central role in the history of the country, and its history runs almost parallel with the history of the Icelandic Commonwealth.

=== From commonwealth to foreign rule ===
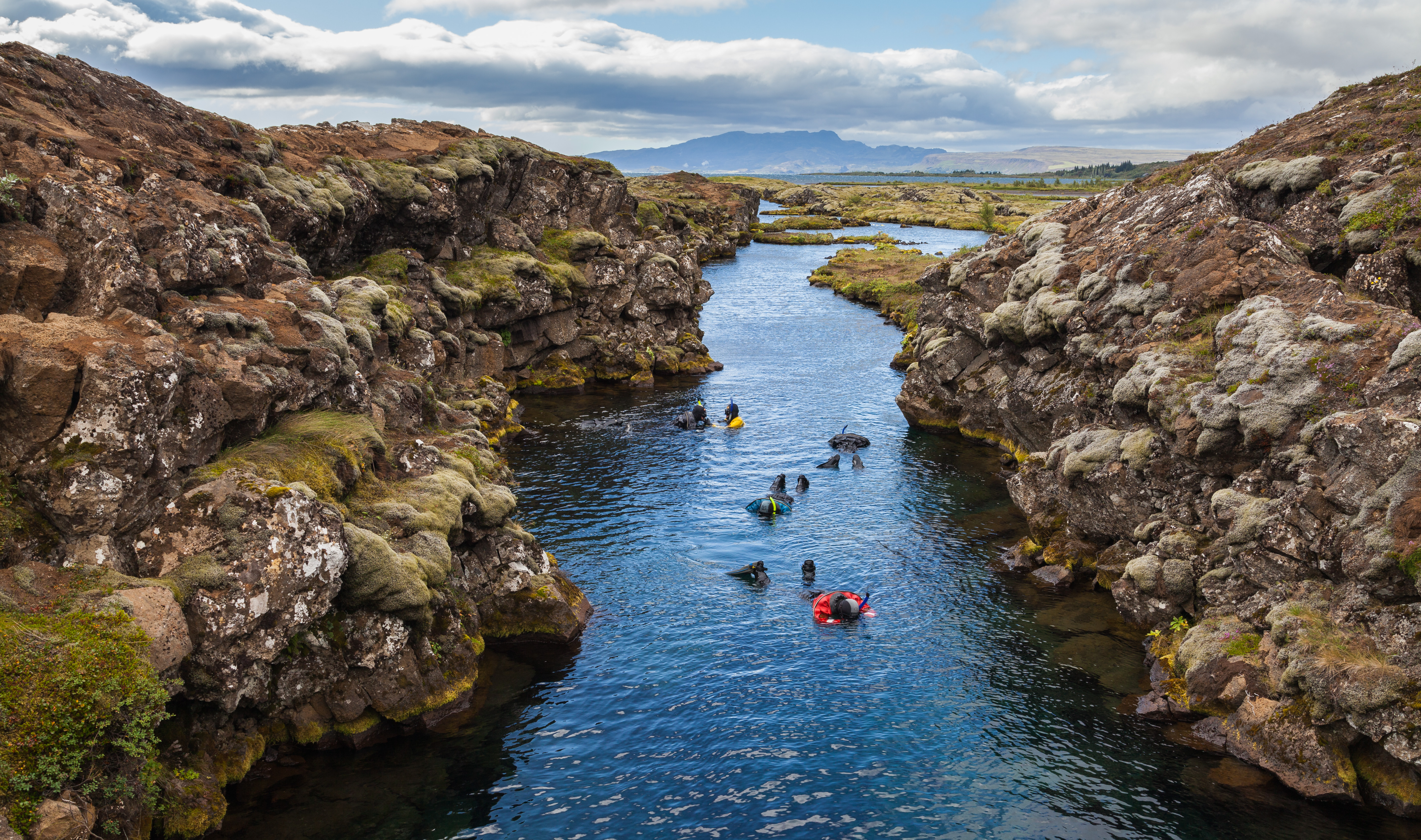
Snorkeling in the Silfra canyon.

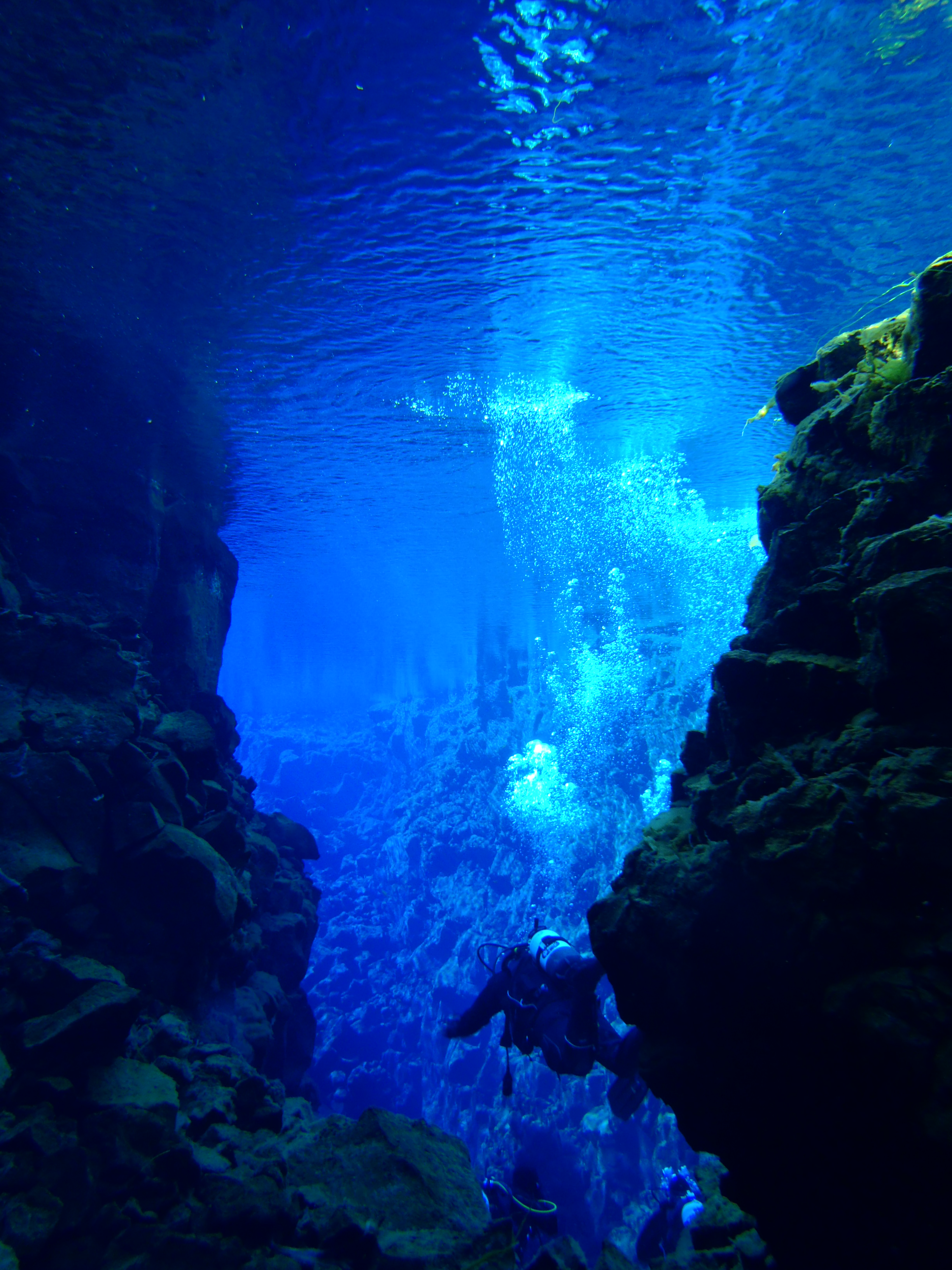
Scuba diver in the Silfra.

The Alþingi (assembly) at Þingvellir was an annual two-week gathering for discussion of law and politics, convened from 930 until 1798. At Þingvellir, disputes were settled and laws were set by the assembly. The Lögberg or Law Rock was the focal point of the Alþingi and a natural platform for holding speeches. The Lawspeaker, elected for three years at a time, presided over the assembly and recited the law of the land. Before the law was written down, he was expected to recite it from memory on the Lögberg throughout three summers along with the complete assembly procedures every summer. Inauguration and dissolution of the assembly took place at the Lögberg, where rulings made by the Law Council were announced, the calendar was confirmed, legal actions were brought and other announcements made which concerned the entire nation. Anyone attending the assembly was entitled to present his case on important issues from the Lögberg.

The Law Council served as both parliament and supreme court. Laws were passed and approved there, and rulings were made on points of law. The Law Council appointed members of the Fifth Court (a kind of appellate court) and the Lawspeaker and took part in the election of the bishop. Unlike the Alþingi, the Law Council was a closed body in which only certain people enjoyed full rights: chieftains who held the office of goði, their Þingmen and later also bishops. However, everyone at the assembly was entitled to watch and listen to the Law Council at work.

From the earliest times until the 15th century, the Law Council met at Neðri-Vellir on the east bank of Öxará, but when the river changed its course around 1500, the council was moved to an islet in the river. In 1594, the Law Council was relocated to the foot of the ancient Law Rock, where it remained until the Alþingi was finally transferred from it in 1798.

The Alþingi was Iceland's legislative and chief judicial authority for the duration of the Commonwealth, until 1271. Executive power was in the hands of the chieftains and parties to individual cases. This proved to be quite an adequate arrangement for as long as the balance of power remained, but flaws emerged when it was disrupted.

In the final decades of the Commonwealth, there were clashes between chieftain families, which resulted in Iceland coming under the Norwegian crown. Executive power was strengthened under this new order, while legislative and judicial authority at first remained in the hands of the Alþingi, but was gradually transferred to the Norwegian and later the Danish rulers, until in 1662 when the King of Denmark became the absolute monarch of Iceland.

Þingvellir covered in snow

=== Social centre ===
Þingvellir was the centre of Icelandic culture. Every year during the Commonwealth period, people would flock to Þingvellir from all over the country, sometimes numbering in the thousands.

They set up temporary dwellings (búð [ˈpuːθ], pl. búðir [ˈpuːðɪr̥]) with walls of turf and rock and temporary roofing of homespun cloth, and stayed in them for the two weeks of the assembly. There were no permanent buildings on Þingvellir apart from a farm and, later, two churches.

Although the duties of the assembly were the main reason for going there, ordinary people gathered at Þingvellir for a wide variety of reasons. Merchants, sword-sharpeners, and tanners would sell their goods and services, entertainers performed, and ale-makers brewed drinks for the assembly guests. News was told from distant parts; games and feasts were held. Young people met to make their plans, no less than leading national figures and experts in law. Itinerant farmhands looked for work and vagrants begged. Þingvellir was a meeting place for everyone in Iceland, laying the foundation for the language and literature that have been a prominent part of people's lives right up to the present day.

=== Nationalist symbol ===
During the 19th century, Þingvellir emerged as a nationalist symbol. According to Icelandic political scientist Birgir Hermannsson, "Thingvellir can be likened to a church or building which serves as a pilgrimage destination and as a site for the nation-state’s ritual ceremonies."

=== Death of a prime minister ===
Bjarni Benediktsson was the prime minister of Iceland when he died in a fire at a government summer house at Þingvellir on 10 July 1970. His wife and grandson also perished in the blaze.

== Geology ==
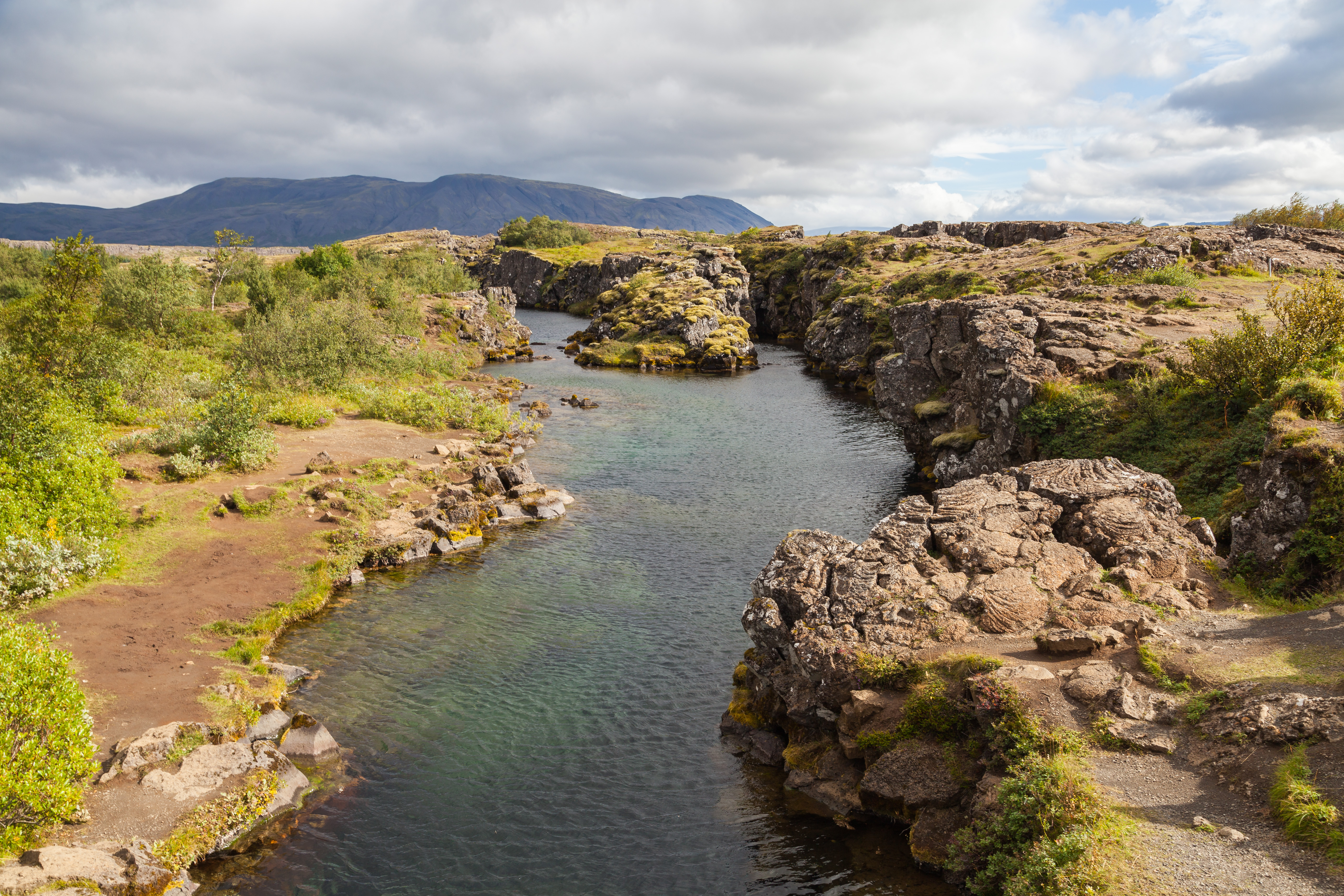
Flosagja canyon

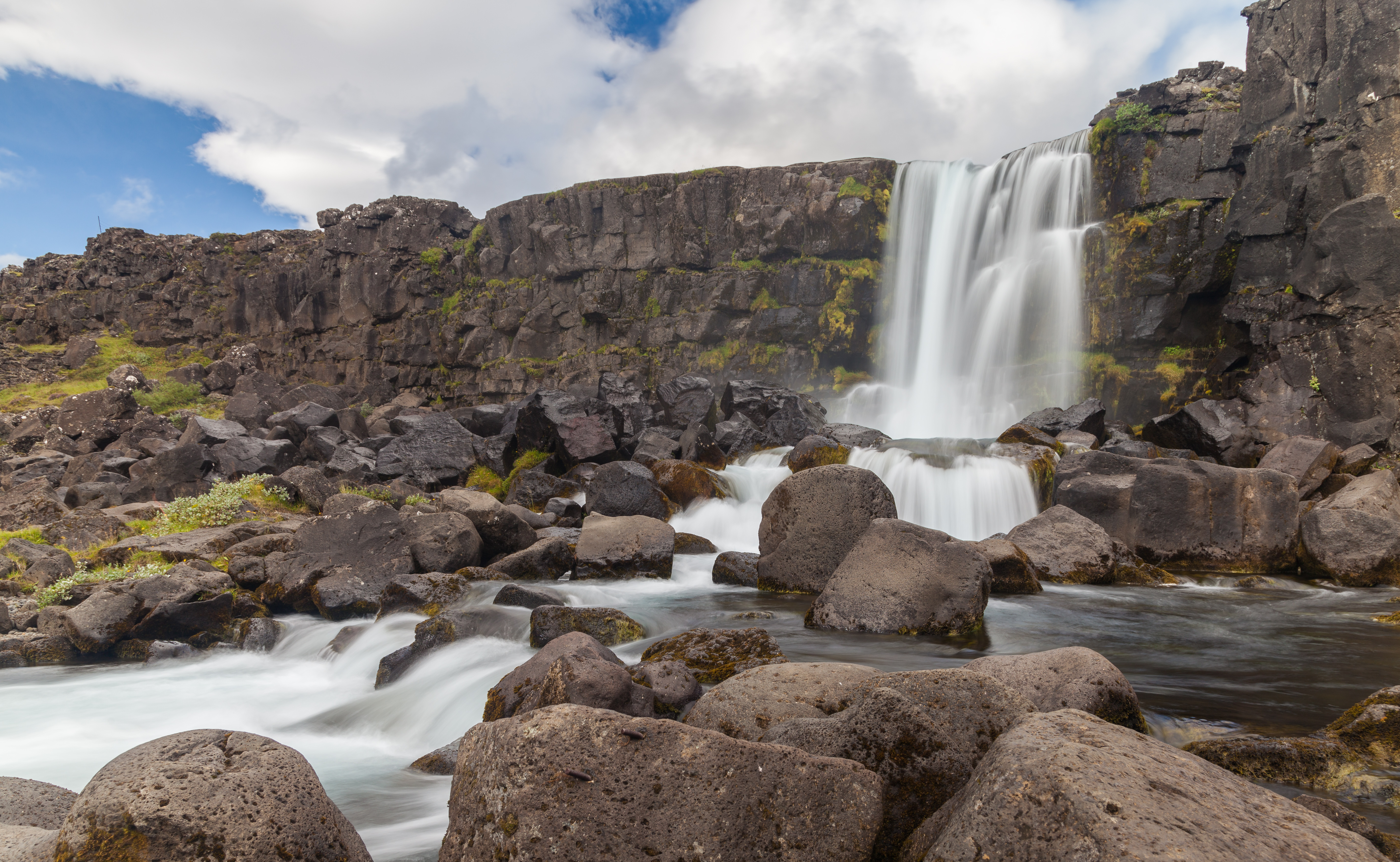
Öxarárfoss

Þingvellir is notable for its unusual tectonic and volcanic environment in a rift valley.

The continental drift between the North American and Eurasian Plates can be clearly seen in the cracks or faults which traverse the region, the largest one, Almannagjá, being a veritable canyon. This also causes the often measurable earthquakes in the area.

Some of the rifts are full of clear water. One, Nikulásargjá [ˈnɪːkʏˌlauːsarˌcauː], was bridged for the occasion of the visit of King Frederik VIII of Denmark in 1907. On this occasion, visitors began to throw coins from the bridge into the fissure, a tradition based on European legends. The bottom has become littered with sparkling coins, and the rift is now better known as Peningagjá [ˈpɛːniŋkaˌcauː], or "coin fissure".

Þingvellir is situated on the northern shore of Þingvallavatn, the largest natural lake of Iceland. The river Öxará traverses the national park and forms a waterfall at the Almannagjá [ˈalˌmanːaˌcauː], called Öxarárfoss. On the lake's northern shore, the Silfra fissure is a popular diving and snorkelling tour location.

Þingvellir was designated a UNESCO World Heritage Site based on cultural criteria. It may also qualify on geological criteria in the future, as there has been ongoing discussion of a possible "serial transboundary nomination" for the Mid-Atlantic Ridge, which would include other sites in the Atlantic such as Pico Island.

Together with the waterfall Gullfoss and the geysers of Haukadalur, Þingvellir is part of a group of the most famous sights of Iceland, the Golden Circle.

== Art ==
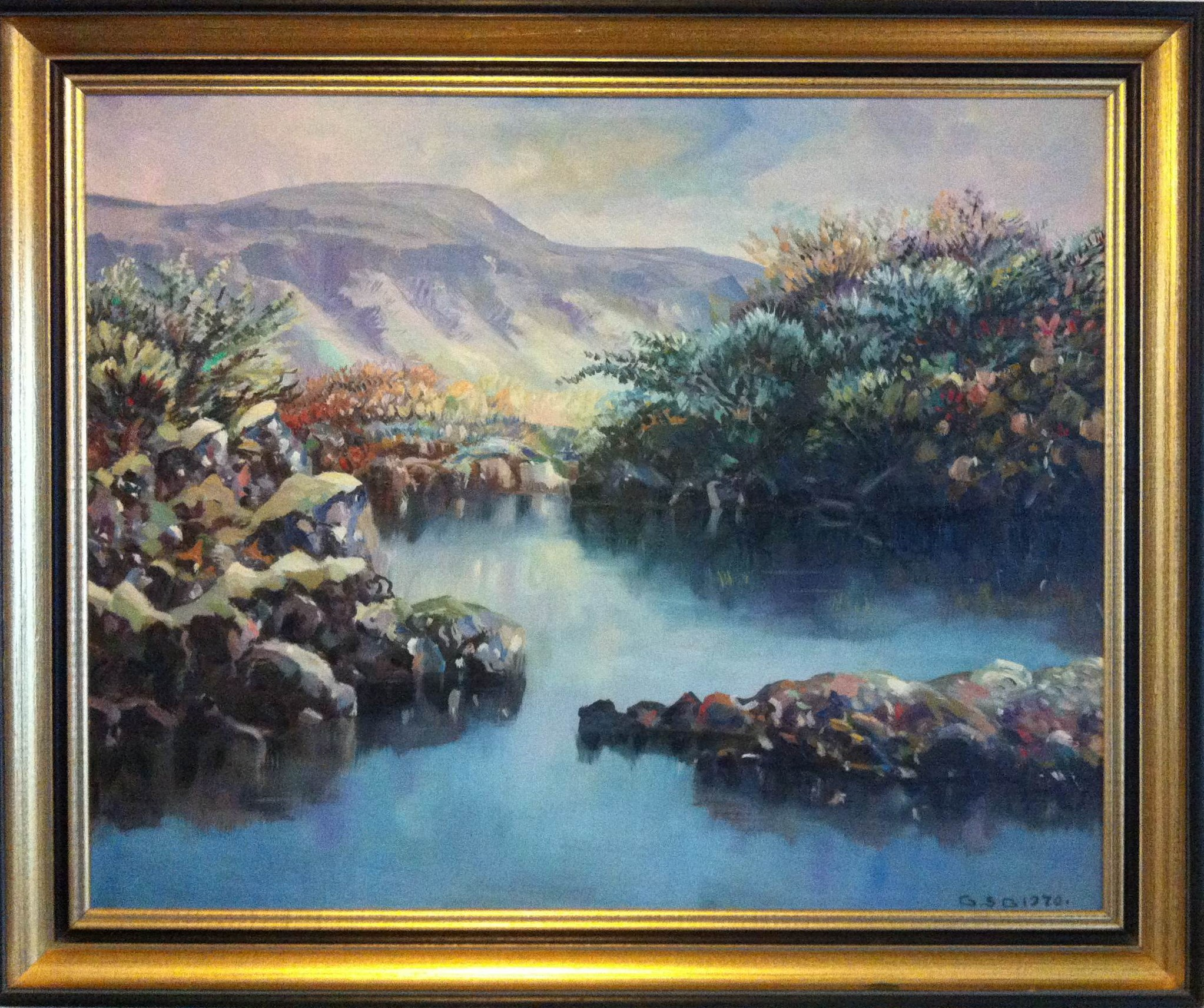
The painting "From Þingvellir" by the Icelandic painter Gunnar Gestsson, 1970.

Because of its natural environment, Þingvellir has been a subject in the works of several Icelandic painters, including Johannes Sveinsson Kjarval and Ásgrímur Jónsson. The National Gallery of Iceland owns more than 150 paintings by Ásgrímur Jónsson that have Þingvellir as their subject. Þingvellir grew popular among artists not only for its natural environment but also because it was close to the capital of Iceland, Reykjavík and thus relatively inexpensive to travel there.

== Tourism ==
Map showing the extent of the park.

Þingvellir National Park is popular with tourists and is one of the three key attractions within the famous Golden Circle. There is a visitor centre, where visitors can obtain an interpretation of the history and nature of Þingvellir. There is an information centre near the camping grounds. There are hiking trails, such as the Execution Trail and the nearby Leggjabrjótur [ˈlɛcːaˌprjouːtʏr̥]. Scuba diving has also become popular at Silfra Lake as the continental drift between the tectonic plates made it wide enough for divers to enjoy unparalleled visibility.

== Related places ==
=== Culturally related places ===
==== Things (assemblies) ====
- Gulating, one of the first Norwegian legislative assemblies and one of the present-day law courts of western Norway.
- Jamtamót, the historical legislative assembly of Jämtland.
- Løgting, the parliament of the Faroe Islands and Tinganes, the site of the Faroese government.
- Tynwald, the legislature of the Isle of Man. Tynwald shares the root and meaning of its name with Þingvellir.

==== Cognate toponyms ====
- Dingwall, a royal burgh in the Scottish Highlands.
- Thingwall, a village in Wirral, England.
- Tingwall, a parish in Shetland.
- Tingwall, a hamlet and harbour in Orkney.
- Tingvoll Municipality, a municipality in Norway.
- Thingvalla Township in the U.S. state of North Dakota, one of that state's earliest Icelandic settlements, was named in honor of Þingvellir.

=== Geologically related places ===
- Gough and Inaccessible Islands in the South Atlantic.
- Pico Island in the Azores.

== Related things ==
- The Thingvalla Line, a Danish shipping company active between 1879 and 1898, was named after Þingvellir. At its peak, the company had ten ships in its fleet, one of which was named the S/S Thingvalla, launched in 1873. The company operated four other ships which bore Icelandic names, namely the S/S Geiser, S/S Island and two vessels named S/S Hekla.

== See also ==
- Crymostygius thingvallensis, a species of subterranean amphipod crustacean, endemic to the area around Þingvallavatn.
