= Öxarárfoss =

Coordinates: 64°15′59″N 21°07′18″W

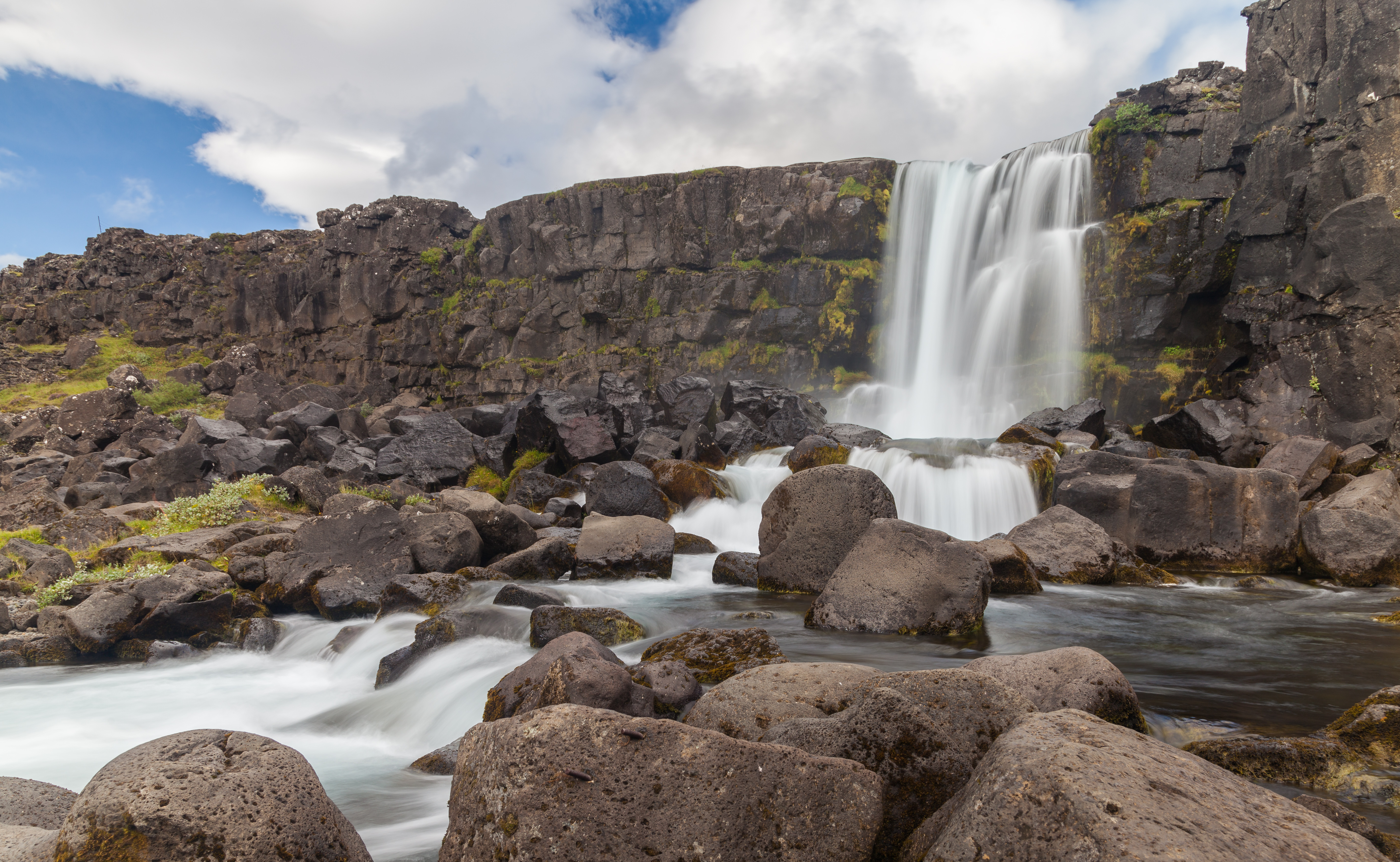

- Location within Iceland
- Location: South of Iceland

Öxarárfoss (Icelandic pronunciation: [ˈœksarˌaurˌfɔsː]) is a waterfall in Þingvellir National Park, Iceland. It flows from the river Öxará over the Almannagjá ([ˈalˌmanːaˌcauː]). The pool at the base of the waterfall is filled with rocks and is often extremely icy during winter.

The waterfall is one of the main attractions of Þingvellir National Park.

== In culture ==
An edited photograph of the waterfall by David Carson is used as the cover of Nine Inch Nails's album The Fragile. A pixelated version is used on The Fragile: Deviations 1, an expanded instrumental version of said album.

== See also ==
- List of waterfalls
- List of waterfalls in Iceland
