= Crymostygius =

Crymostygius thingvallensis

Scientific classification
- Domain: Eukaryota
- Kingdom: Animalia
- Phylum: Arthropoda
- Class: Malacostraca
- Order: Amphipoda
- Family: Crymostygidae; Kristjánsson & Svavarsson, 2004
- Genus: Crymostygius; Kristjánsson & Svavarsson, 2004
- Species: C. thingvallensis

Binomial name
- Crymostygius thingvallensis Kristjánsson & Svavarsson, 2004

Genus of crustaceans

Crymostygius thingvallensis is a species of subterranean amphipod crustacean, endemic to the area around Þingvallavatn, a lake in southwestern Iceland. The species has no close relatives, and is placed in its own family, Crymostygidae. This distinctness has been confirmed by molecular phylogenetics.
