= Aircraft Accident Investigation Board (Iceland) =

Safety Investigation Authority
- Established: 2013
- Focus: Investigate transportation accidents
- Head: Þorkell Ágústsson, head of aviation investigations Sævar Helgi Lárusson, head of traffic investigations Jón Pétursson, head of maritime investigations
- Staff: ~ 7 (along with 13 board members)
- Address: Flugvallarvegur 7, 102, Reykjavík
- Location: Iceland
- Website: https://www.rnsa.is

The Safety Investigation Authority (SIA, Icelandic: Rannsóknarnefnd samgönguslysa) is an agency of the government of Iceland. It investigates maritime, traffic, and aviation accidents and incidents, as well as other serious incidents. It is headquartered in Reykjavík. The SIA reports to the Minister of the Interior.

It was established in 2013 when the board of investigations for aviation accidents, traffic accidents and maritime accidents was combined together into one institution. It consists of 7 staff, 2 for each division along with one receptionist. It also has a board with 13 members that don't work full-time for the institution.
