= Þingvallavatn =

Lake in southwestern Iceland

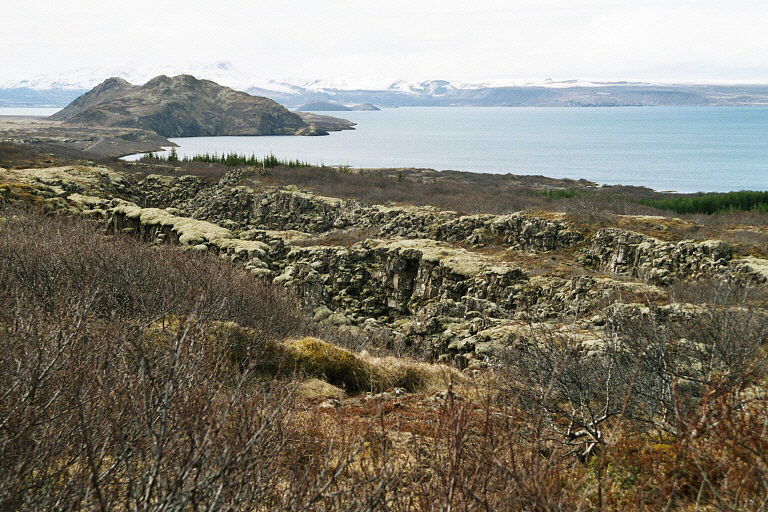
- Fissures at the lake

- Location within Iceland
- Location: Þingvellir National Park
- Coordinates: 64°11′15″N 21°08′06″W
- Primary outflows: Sog
- Basin countries: Iceland
- Surface area: 84 km^{2} (32 sq mi)
- Average depth: 34 m (112 ft)
- Max. depth: 114 m (374 ft)
- Water volume: 2.856 km^{3} (0.685 cu mi)
- Residence time: 11 months
- Islands: Sandey

Þingvallavatn (Icelandic pronunciation: [ˈθiŋkˌvatlaˌvahtn̥], lit. 'Þingvellir Lake'), anglicised as Thingvallavatn, is a rift valley lake in southwestern Iceland. With a surface of 84 km^{2} (32 sq mi) it is the largest natural lake in Iceland. Its greatest depth is 114 m (374 ft). At the northern shore of the lake, at Þingvellir (after which the lake is named), the Alþingi, the national parliament, was founded in the year 930, and held its sessions there until 1799 and still as of today the name Alþingi Íslendinga is carried by the parliament of Iceland.

The lake lies partially within Þingvellir National Park. The volcanic origin of the islands in the lake is clearly visible. The cracks and faults around it, of which the Almannagjá [ˈalˌmanːaˌcauː] ravine is the largest, is where the Eurasian and North American tectonic plates meet. Silfra fissure is a popular scuba and snorkeling site. The only outflow from lake Þingvallavatn is the river Sog.

One of the noted features of the lake is the presence of four morphs of the Arctic charr.

== See also ==
- List of lakes of Iceland
- Volcanism of Iceland
- Geography of Iceland
- 2022 Þingvallavatn plane crash
