= Háifoss =

Coordinates: 64.2079°N 19.6869°W

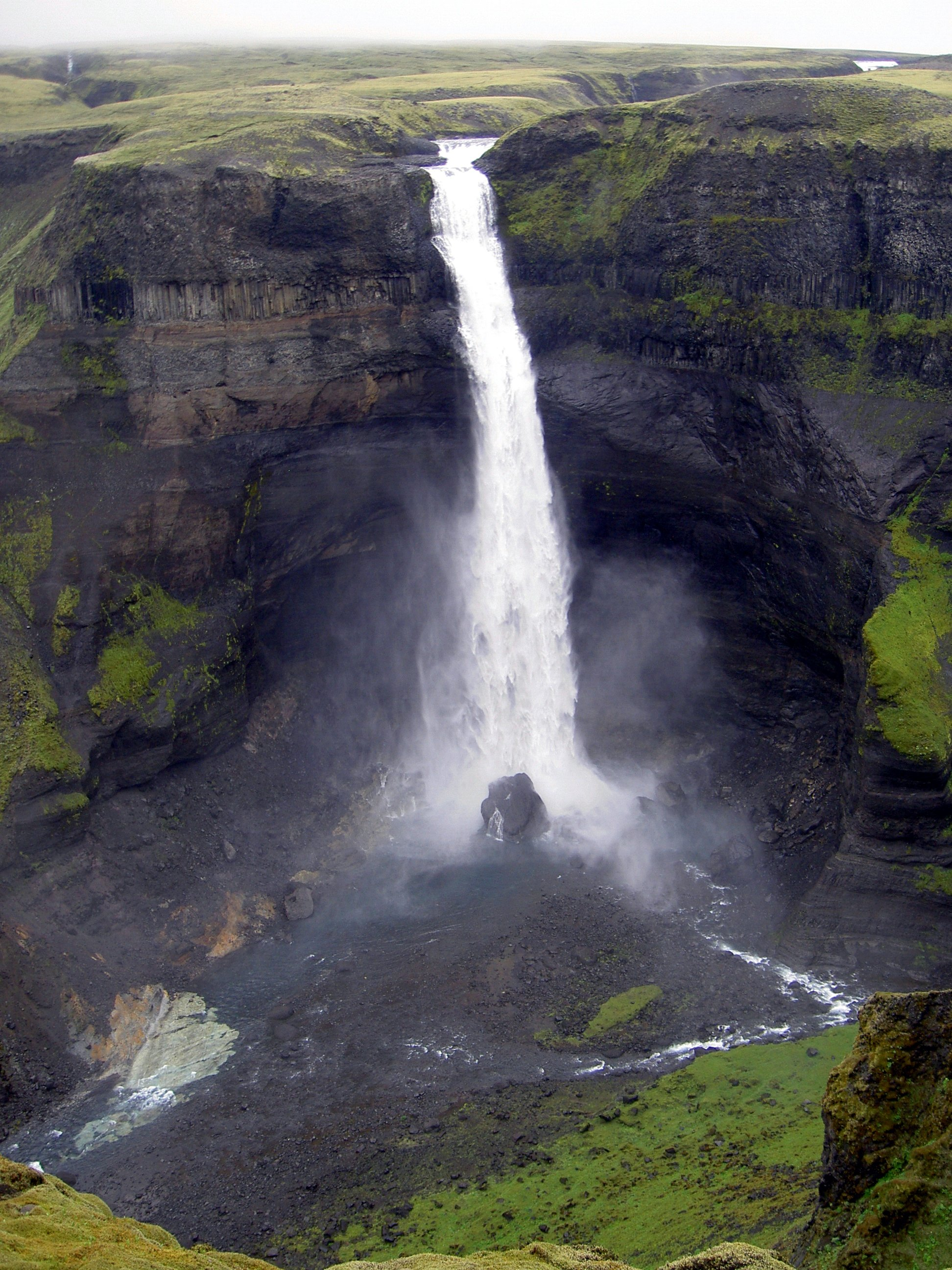

- Location within Iceland
- Location: South of Iceland
- Total height: 122 metres (400 ft)
- Number of drops: 1

Háifoss (Icelandic pronunciation: [ˈhauːɪˌfɔsː]) is a waterfall situated near the volcano Hekla in southern Iceland. The waterfall Granni is next to it. The river Fossá, a tributary of Þjórsá, drops here from a height of 122 m. This is the fourth highest waterfall of the island, after Morsárfoss, Glymur and Hengifoss.

From the historical farm Þjóðveldisbærinn Stöng, which was destroyed by a volcanic eruption of Hekla in the Middle Ages and reconstructed, it is possible to hike to the waterfall along the Fossá (5 to 6 hours both directions). Above the waterfall, there is also a parking lot, to allow hiking to be done in the other direction.

== See also ==
- List of waterfalls
- Waterfalls of Iceland
