= List of waterfalls in Iceland =

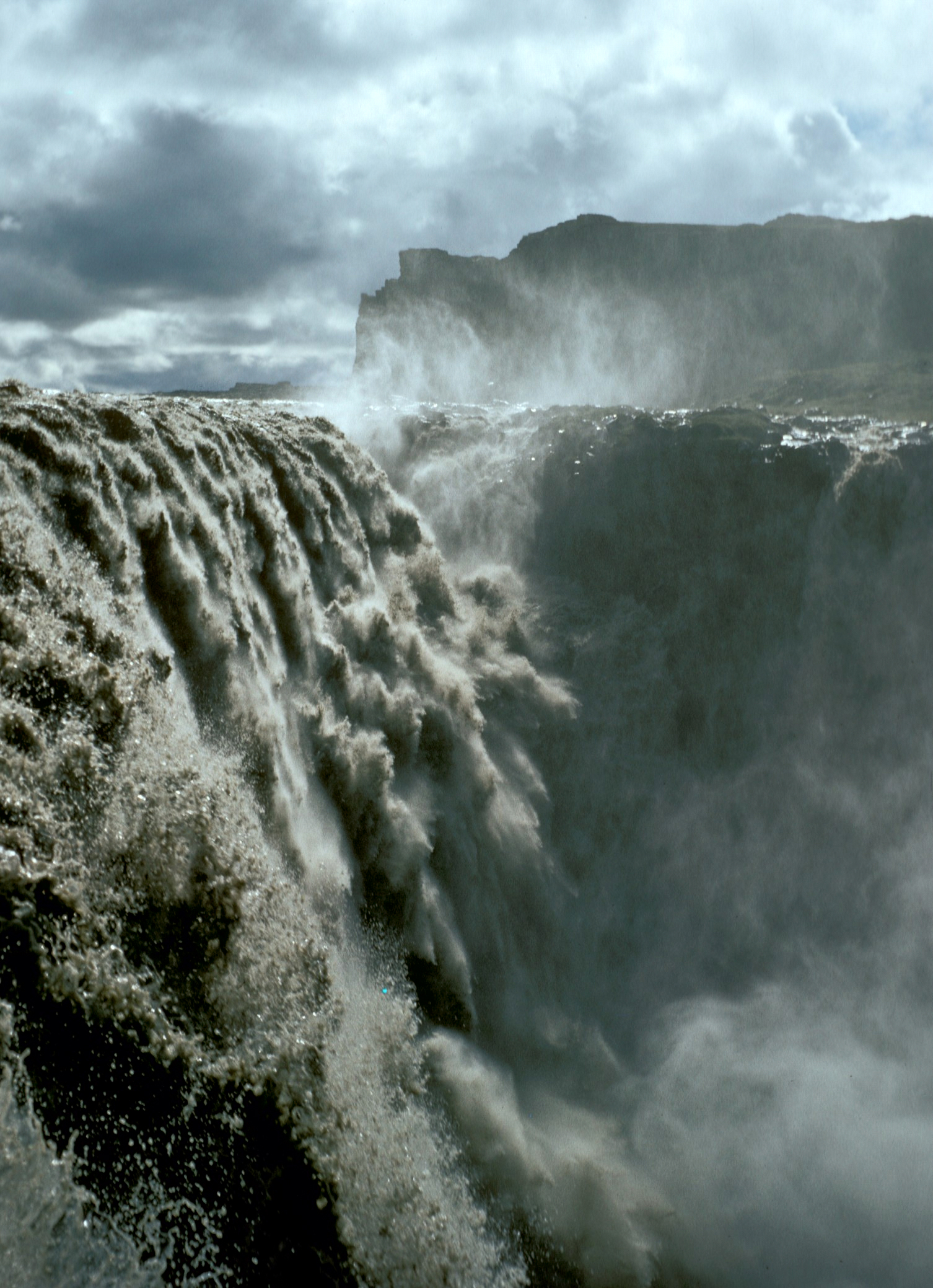
Dettifoss, in Northern Iceland

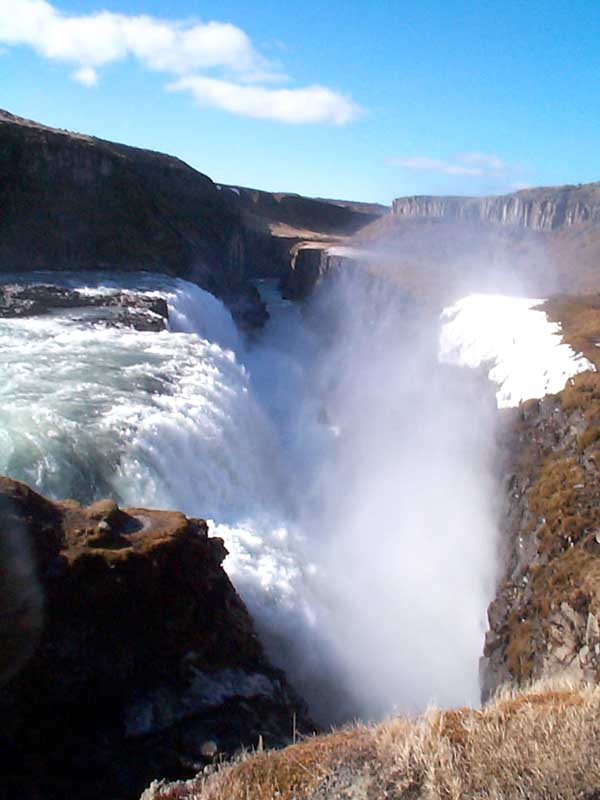
Gullfoss, in Southern Iceland

Iceland is well suited for waterfalls (Icelandic: s. foss, pl. fossar). This Nordic island country lies along the Mid-Atlantic Ridge which separates North America and Europe near where the North Atlantic and Arctic Oceans meet. Frequent rain and snow is caused by its near-Arctic location. Large glaciers exist throughout the country whose summer melts feed many rivers. As a result, it is home to a number of large and powerful waterfalls. It is estimated that there are more than 10,000 waterfalls in Iceland.

== North ==
- Dettifoss is the most powerful waterfall in Iceland.
- Gljúfursárfoss
- Selfoss
- Hafragilsfoss
- Goðafoss
- Aldeyjarfoss

== South ==
- Faxi or Vatnsleysufoss in Tungufljót river
- Foss á Síðu
- Gluggafoss
- Gljúfrafoss
- Gjáin has many small waterfalls
- Gullfoss (Golden Falls)
- Háifoss (High Falls)
- Hjálparfoss
- Kvernufoss
- Merkjárfoss
- Ófærufoss used to be noted for the natural bridge which stood above the falls, but it collapsed in 1993.
- Seljalandsfoss
- Skógafoss (Forest Falls)
- Svartifoss (Black Falls) is one of the many waterfalls of Skaftafell National Park
- Systrafoss, in Kirkjubæjarklaustur
- Þjófafoss on the Merkurhraun lava fields
- Öxarárfoss, at Þingvellir National Park
- Fagrifoss, near Kirkjubæjarklaustur
- Morsárfoss, 228m waterfall formed from the retreat of Morsárjökull that is now Iceland's tallest.
- Urriðafoss

== West ==
- Álafoss
- Barnafossar (the Children's Falls) in Hvítá river
- Glymur in the Hvalfjörður area. At 198m, it was long regarded as the tallest waterfall in Iceland until being surpassed with a new falls by Morsárjökull in 2011.
- Hraunfossar (the Lava Falls) in birchwoods, a stone's throw from Barnafoss.

== Westfjords ==
- Dynjandi, sometimes called Fjallfoss.

== East ==
- Hengifoss
- Litlanesfoss, surrounded by columnar basalt, it is on the way up to Hengifoss
- Fardagafoss near Egilsstaðir
- Gufufoss ("Steam falls") In Seyðisfjörður
- Klifbrekkufossar in Mjóifjörður. A beautiful row of waterfalls

== List of waterfalls by height ==
Picture	Name	Height	Water body	Region	Community	Coordinates	Comment
	Morsárfoss	227.3 m	Morsá	Austurland	Hornafjörður	64°06′45″N 16°53′05″W	Discovered in 2007, measured in 2011;
	Glymur	196 m	Botnsá	Vesturland	Hvalfjarðarsveit	64°23′28″N 21°15′02″W	Considered tallest waterfall until 2011
	Hengifoss	128 m	Hengifossá	Austurland	Fljótsdalur	65°05′44″N 14°53′25″W	Alternative height: 110 m
	Háifoss	122 m	Fossá í Þjórsárdal	Suðurland	Skeiða- og Gnúpverjahreppur	64°12′29″N 19°41′16″W	Neighbour of Granni
	Granni	101 m	Fossá í Þjórsárdal	Suðurland	Skeiða- og Gnúpverjahreppur	64°12′33″N 19°41′00″W	Neighbour of Háifoss
	Dynjandi	100 m	Dynjandisá	Vestfirðir	Vesturbyggð	65°43′57″N 23°11′56″W	Alternative name: Fjallfoss; Tallest waterfall of the Westfjords
	Rjúkandi	93 m	Ysta-Rjúkandi	Austurland	Fljótsdalshérað	65°20′05″N 15°04′55″W	between Egilsstaðir and Mývatn
	Foss á Síðu	82 m	Fossá	Suðurland	Skaftárhreppur	63°51′21″N 17°52′12″W	close to Kirkjubæjarklaustur
	Bjarnafoss	80 m	Bjarnaá	Vesturland	Snæfellsbær	64°50′54″N 23°24′12″W	
	Fagrifoss	80 m	Geirlandsá	Suðurland	Skaftárhreppur	63°52′01″N 18°15′00″W	in Vatnajökull National Park
	Skiptárfoss	80 m	Skiptá	Vestfirðir	Reykhólahreppur; Vesturbyggð	65°36′22″N 22°55′31″W	
	Þórðarfoss	80 m	Þórðara	Suðurland	Rangárþing eystra	63°43′19″N 19°53′55″W	close to Merkjárfoss
	Grundarfoss	70 m	Grundará	Vesturland	Grundarfjörður	64°54′32″N 23°13′21″W	at Snæfellsnes
	Systrafoss	69 m	Fossá	Suðurland	Skaftárhreppur	63°47′09″N 18°03′35″W	close to Kirkjubæjarklaustur
	Seljalandsfoss	65 m	Seljalandsá	Suðurland	Rangárþing eystra	63°36′56″N 19°59′16″W	
	Skógafoss	62 m	Skógá	Suðurland	Rangárþing eystra	63°31′56″N 19°30′41″W	
	Írárfoss	60 m	Írá	Suðurland	Rangárþing eystra	63°34′39″N 19°49′44″W	

== See also ==
- List of waterfalls
