= Gljúfrafoss =

Small waterfall in Seljalandsfoss, Iceland

Coordinates: 63°37′17″N 19°59′18″W

Gljúfrabúi
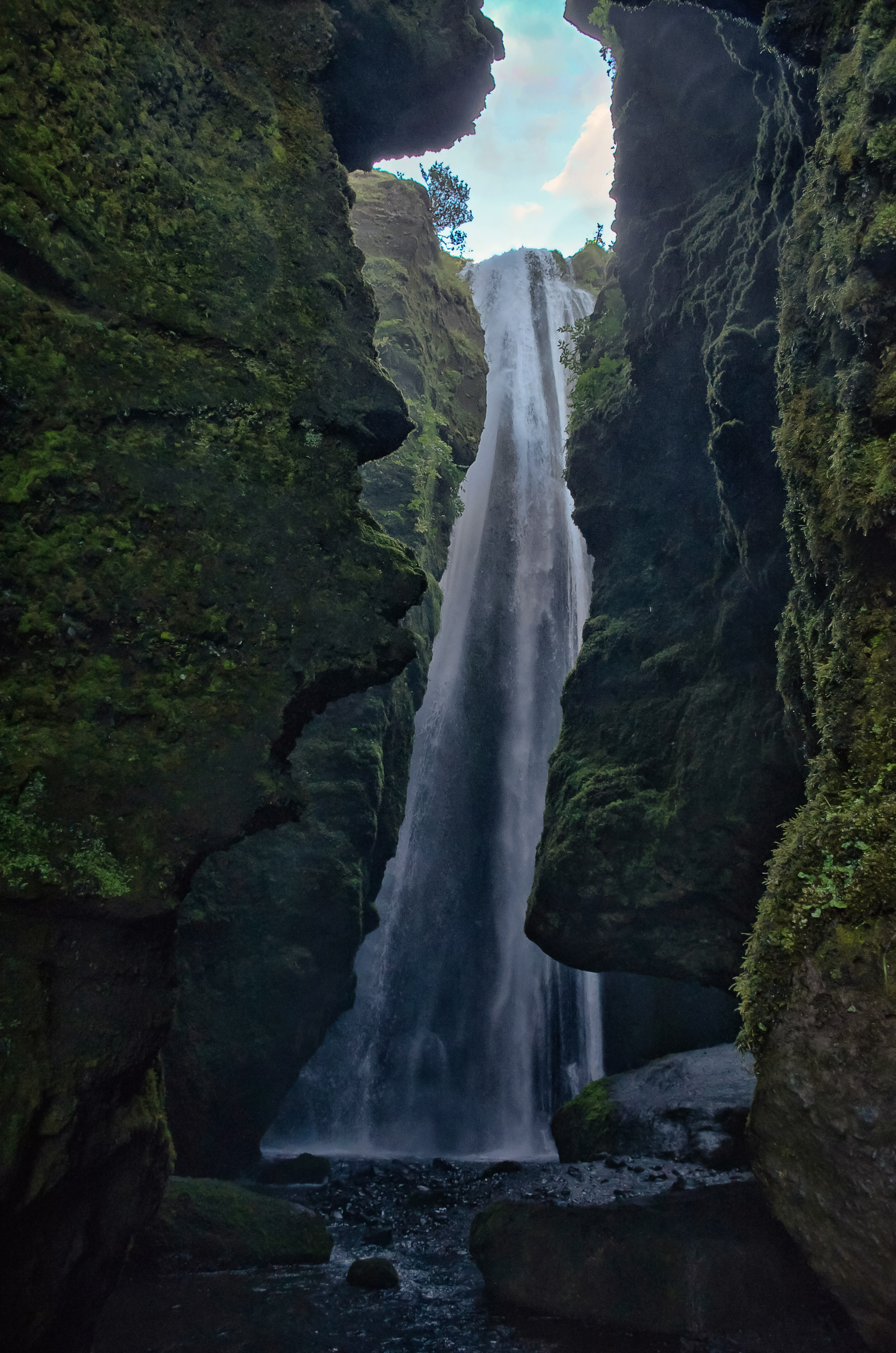
- Location: South of Iceland
- Number of drops: 1

Gljúfrafoss (Icelandic pronunciation: [ˈkljuvraˌfɔsː]) or Gljúfrabúi [-ˈpuːɪ] ("one who lives in the canyon") is a small waterfall north of the larger falls of Seljalandsfoss in Iceland. The falls are partially obscured by the cliff rock, but hikers can follow a trail to enter the narrow canyon where the water plummets to a small pool. There is also a winding trail nearby and a wooden staircase to enable sightseers to climb roughly halfway up and view the falls from another perspective.

== See also ==
- Waterfalls of Iceland
- List of waterfalls
