= Fljótsdalshreppur =

- Municipality
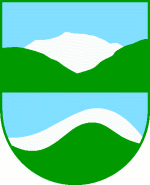
- Coat of arms

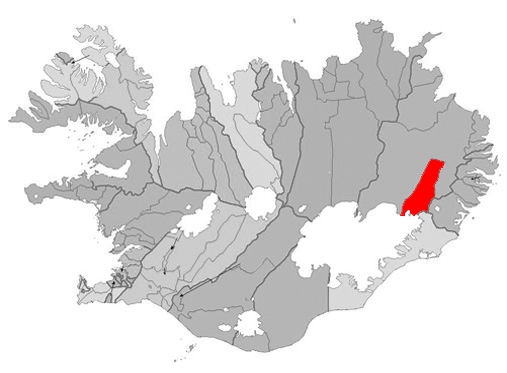
- Location of the municipality

- Location within Iceland
- Coordinates: 65°0′54.83″N 14°56′15.02″W
- Country: Iceland
- Region: Eastern Region
- Constituency: Northeast Constituency

Government
  - Manager: Helgi Gíslason

Area
  - Total: 1,516 km^{2} (585 sq mi)

Population
  - Total: 100
  - Density: 0.05/km^{2} (0.13/sq mi)
- Municipal number: 7505
- Website: www.fljotsdalur.is

Fljótsdalshreppur (Icelandic pronunciation: [ˈfljoutsˌtalsˌr̥ɛhpʏr̥]) is a municipality in Iceland. The Municipality of Fljótsdalur in the Fljótsdalur valley covers more than 1,516 km^{2} (585 sq mi), extending from the glacier Vatnajökull in the south to in the north the Lagarfljót river with the large Hengifoss waterfall. The Fljótsdalur valley is divided into the South valley and the North valley at the central peak of Múli. A large area of land of the highland plateau in the municipality of Fljótsdalur is part of the Vatnajökull National Park, which encompasses spectacular natural resources and is important in Icelandic cultural history.

Snæfell, the highest mountain in Iceland that is not part of a glacier at 1,833 m (6,014 ft), is one of the principal landmarks of the area. Nearly 2,500 ha (6,200 acres) of the municipality of Fljótsdalur is covered by forest, which means that below 400 m (1,300 ft) forests and forestry areas account for nearly 18% of the surface area of the municipality. The lowland area, called Fljótsdalsgrundin, is characterised by arable and high-yielding meadows and fields. Hengifoss, the third highest waterfall in Iceland, at 128 m (420 ft), is located in Hengifossá in Fljótsdalshreppur.

The population of the municipality is about 100 and it is currently without a population centre, although there are plans to develop one. Other than farming the major work locations are the Kárahnjúkar Hydropower Plant, the Vatnajökull National Park Snæfell visitor centre, Gunnarsstofnun and Klausturkaffi at the Skriðuklaustur cultural center, a guest house at Hengifoss, Skógarafurðir saw mill and The Wilderness Center in Norðurdalur, in addition to the municipal office at Végarður.

== Defining characteristics ==
=== Sustainable use of resources ===
For centuries, sheep farming has been done on nearly all the farms in Fljótsdalur. The land is fertile and vegetation is spreading widely. The valley has fields with natural irrigation and arable lowlands. Revegetation and cultivation efforts have yielded visible results. Agroforestry in Iceland began with the Fljótsdal plan in 1970. As a consequence, the valley is abundant with forests that are used for various forestry products such as panelling, parquet and fenceposts, in addition to which there is a considerable production of Christmas trees. Timber that is left over from forestry operations is also used as fuel to heat houses. Through modern and environmentally friendly technological solutions, lakes and rivers have been harnessed to produce electricity through hydropower. Reindeer are hunted in a sustainable and organised manner.

=== Unique nature ===
Fljótsdalur has unique and beautiful natural surroundings and is visited by a large number of tourists each year. The climate is known far and wide to be pleasant, with warm summers and winters with low precipitation. There are good conditions for farming, especially sheep farming. The local bird life is highly varied, with 50 species of birds having been spotted at Snæfell. The Eyjabakkar area above Fljótsdalur is specifically protected in accordance with the RAMSAR Convention. This protection is due to the international importance of naturally irrigated fields, as the area is one of the largest wetlands in the highlands of Iceland, and a major natural sanctuary for pink-footed geese that lay thousands of eggs in the Snæfell wilderness. The highlands of Fljótsdalur has vegetation that reaches up to about 600 m above sea level, which can also be considered unique. The Vatnajökull National Park, which includes part of the municipality of Fljótsdalur, is on the UNESCO cultural heritage list and one of the largest national parks in Western Europe. The principal habitat and migration routes of the reindeer population in Iceland are within the boundaries of the municipality of Fljótsdalur. What mostly attracts tourists to the area are the natural marvels Strútsfoss, Kirkjufoss and last but not least Snæfell. The wild birch forests Kleifarskógur and Ranaskógur are quite exceptional and among the vegetation is northern bedstraw, which is the signature plant of Fljótsdalur. Fljótsdalur has blue bells, viola tricolor, mountain flax, common witlow grass, woodland geranium and rock bramble in more abundance than other areas of East Iceland.

=== Architecture ===
There are few other places in rural Iceland with architecture of such interesting and often avantgarde nature. Most famous is Gunnarshús at Skriðuklaustur, the design of which is inspired by the work of German architect Fritz Höger. Skriðuklaustur is also the site of the ruins of a monastery of the order of Saint Augustine from the 16th century. Not only can the remains be viewed but the experience has been enhanced by providing digital technical solutions and virtual reality to achieve the vision of a "museum without walls". Snæfellsstofa, the Vatnajökull National Park visitor centre, is designed by the architectural firm ARKÍS and was the first new building in Iceland to receive both design compliance and completion certification according to the British environmental certification system BREEAM in 2016.

Under construction is a service building at Hengifoss, selected in a public design contest. The building is designed by the Norwegian architect Eirik Rönning Andersen, and has a clear reference to the local topography so it will fit well in with its nearby environment. Also worthy of note is the social centre Végarður, which was designed by architect Gísli Halldórsson, as well as Fljótsdalsstöð, designed by the architectural firm OG and realised in cooperation with Verkís and Landmark, in addition to a large number of buildings the origins of which can be traced to the rural architecture archives of the Agricultural design office. The farmyard at Langhús has unique buildings made of turf and rock and the reconstruction efforts of the Wilderness Center evoke times long past.

The Valþjófsstaður door is a national treasure, originally from a stave church that used to stand in the valley, and a replica of it is installed in the church at Valþjófsstaður.

== Residential housing ==
The municipality of Fljótsdalur has a general plan that is in effect until 2030. According to that general plan as many as three residential buildings may be built on each parcel of land without a specific plan being required. In 2020 the municipality made an agreement with TGJ design, consultancy and research firm on finding a site for an attractive, unique and ecofriendly residential area that does not clash with the surrounding landscape, in a naturally secure location and that will be accessible and suitable for the expanding economic activities in the valley. The location of this residential area should also be selected based on environmental psychology, so that the layout will maximise the wellbeing and positive experience of residents and visitors. It is also emphasised in the current general plan that all special planning will contribute to better shaping of the environment, such as regarding size, form, material, look and color choice where new buildings are concerned. A site has been selected for the residential area on the land of Hjarðarból, and special planning and consequent alterations to the general plan are being worked out.

== Utilities ==
=== Electricity production ===
The Kárahnjúkar Hydropower Plant in Fljótsdalur is the largest power plant in Iceland. It has 690 MW of installed power and can generate 4,800 gigawatt hours of electricity per year. The station is located about 800 m (2,600 ft) inside the mountain Valþjófsstaðarfjall with about a 400 m (1,300 ft) hydraulic head. From Hálslón, the main reservoir, the water runs about 40 km (25 mi) through headrace canals to the plant. Two smaller reservoirs use water from the river Jökulsá í Fljótsdal and the lakes Ufsarlón and Kelduárlón, from which the water runs through underground tunnels and is joined with water from Hálslón in one headrace canal that leads to the plant with a total hydraulic head of about 600 m (2,000 ft). The water powers six turbines and then runs through a canal into Jökulsá river in Fljótsdalur close to Valþjófsstaður. The main part of the energy goes from the plant over Hallormsstaðaháls to the aluminium smelter Alcoa Fjarðaál at Reyðarfjörður. A new power transmission line, called Kröflulína 3, now connects the three plants Þeistareykjavirkjun, Kröfluvirkjun and Fljótsdalur stabilising the electricity transmission system, and helping assure supply. There is thus mains electrical supply throughout Fljótsdalur although a few farms have 620 kV small plants with potential for expanding them. For example, small hydroelectic plants using new technology that is suitable for rivers with high flow rates may be possible.

=== Waste management ===
Households that pay the local tipping fee sort their waste into general, recyclable and organic waste. Organic waste is not collected, households are provided with special bins for such waste. Other waste is collected and either deposited in approved landfill sites or recycled. Commercial waste is not entirely managed within the Municipality but rather the companies have commercial contracts regarding containers and the emptying of them. There is a waste container area near Végarður where the municipality has rented skips for iron, timber, general/ unsortable waste and hazardous waste (batteries). The municipality has also offered farmers the option to temporarily use skips for iron and timber if they are engaging in specific projects. There are septic tanks at all farmhouses and companies. An officially approved collection pit for sludge is located below Valþjófsstaður.

=== Water utilities ===
Most farmlands in Fljótsdalur have their own water supply, and there are only five registered water utilities. Two are used by the National Power Company, i.e. at Fljótsdalsstöð and at Ufsarlón. There is one utility at Skriðuklaustur, which serves a number of places between Skriðuklaustur and Végarður. In addition, there is a water utility at Laugarfell and further down the road at Hengifossárgil.

=== Telecommunications ===
Telecommunications transmitters for television and radio transmissions, and repeaters for mobile phones are located at various sites in the Municipality and there is a fiber optic network connecting to all farmhouses. Many places have a 3G and 4G connection. The installation of telecommunications systems underground alongside roads and paths is permitted.

=== Heating ===
Fljótsdalur has no central heating plant but there are warm water sources. At Laugarfell there is a geothermal source that is used to heat the housing and natural pools. Close to the Wilderness Center is a thermal spring which is connected to a heat pump that supplies heat for a hot tub and other uses. Further research into geothermal sources is planned. There is a wood fueled heating plant at Végarður and in a few places, wood is used as fuel for heating houses where wood from forestry pruning allows high temperature burning.

== Environment and resources ==
=== Climate ===
Fljótsdalur is known for its gentle weather, characterized by low winds in a generally dry and warm climate. The direction in which the winds blow in influenced by the topography. In Fljótsdalur, south western winds prevail. Vatnajökull and the highlands of the Eastern Fjords shields the area from southern and south eastern winds. The average temperature for the year 2020 at Hallormsstaður was 4.1 °C (39.4 °F) and the average summer temperature (from June to September) was 9.5 °C (49.1 °F). The total precipitation that same year was 982.4 mm (38.68 in), and on average it rains much less in the valley Fljótsdalur than outside it. The lowlands get little snow in the winters, but droughts can be detrimental for vegetation, especially in early summer.

=== Geography and geology ===
Fljótsdalur is surrounded by mountains with an average elevation between 600 and 700 m (2,000 and 2,300 ft), forming a plateau. Erosion by glaciers has formed a trough and a portion of the river Lagarfljót, with alluvium forming a plain a short distance from the lake Fljótsbotn. Streams of water flowing from the high elevation plateaus into the valley form a series of waterfalls. The distance from the coast of Héraðsflói to Fljótsdalur is about 80 km. The inner part of the valley is divided at Múli into the South valley with Kelduá and the North valley with Jökulsá. The bedrock in the area largely consists of igneous rock with reddish sedimentary rock in between.

=== Natural hazards ===
The municipality of Fljótsdalur is situated outside earthquake and volcanic eruption areas. Still, volcanic ash has reached the valley, and it is not uncommon for ash and clay to be blown by the wind over the valley from the highlands when the wind comes in from certain directions. There is a considerable risk of landslides where the solid bedrock is only covered by a thin layer of mantle rock. Earthslides tend to occur following heavy precipita tion. It is not known if there is permafrost anywhere in the area. The best known landslide areas are on the eastern slopes of the mountains Múli in the South valley and Valþjófsstaðarfjall above Valþjófsstaður and Skriðuklaustur. No official risk assessment has been made regarding landslides, avalanches or bush and forest fires. An assessment has been made of the risk of the dams bursting at the reservoirs in Kelduárlón and Ufsarlón, which would cause Lagarfljót to swell. If the dams would burst it is considered possible that six farms and their cultivation land could be at risk from the resulting flooding from Ufsarlón, but Kelduárlón is not considered to pose any danger. There are two farms in the North valley and the others are located in the lowlands between Végarður and Hengifoss. However, the risk of the dams bursting is believed to be an extremely unlikely event and it is not believed that there is any particular risk from any other natural hazards than those stated earlier. It is known that heavy flooding can some times occur, when the snow melts at the end of winter and in voluminous rainfalls, and submerge large parts of the lowlands in the valley. The floods cause the water level of Lagarfljót to rise and have a wide spread effect in the region. The last major flooding occurred in the autumn of 2017.

=== Ecosystem ===
The landscape is beautiful and complex. Sedimented basalt mountains have a strong impact on the look of the valley, as does the flood plain through which the rivers Kelduá and Jökulsá run and join to pour into Lagarfljót along with Gilsá. In many places there are hills covered in forests, wild birch and tree farms. There are also hills where the soil has shifted due to landslides that have carried vegetation and soil along with them. Heather and flowery vegetation has spread widely and there are many grassy meadows and fields. Due to the favourable climate there are plentiful and varied options for cultivation. The Fljótsdalur plateau has vast and verdant heathlands, which are used by sheep farmers for the summer grazing. Sheep farming is a major branch of the agriculture in the Municipality. The principal reindeer habitat in Iceland is located within the area. Part of the Vatnajökull National Park is within the boundaries of the municipality, as is Snæfell. Eyjabakkar is a vegetated wetland area on the plateau, in front of the edge of the glacier Eyjabakkajökull at about 640 m above sea level. The area is an inter nationally important habitat for wetland birds, especially pink footed geese, and for biodiversity. The conservation areas within Vatnajökull National Park are managed according to an approved management and conservation plan that addresses nature conservation, outdoor recreational activities and regional development. Public lands within the geographical boundaries of the Municipality of Fljótsdalur are Villingadalur, Suðurfell, Múli and the land below Fell. In addition, a large part of the land at Valþjófsstaður and Skriðuklaustur is defined as public land.

== Transportation ==
=== Road network ===
There is a good road network connecting to the neighbouring communities. Highway no. 931 goes around Lagarfljót and leads to the Fljótsdalur circle route no. 933. That road can be exited into the Norðurdalur circle route no. 934 to get to the Wilderness Centre and back by route no. 9340 (gravel road) past Fljótsdalsstöð and Valþjófsstaður. From Végarður in Fljótsdalur there are about 15 km (9.3 mi) to Hallormsstaður, and from there it is about 42 km (26 mi) to Egilsstaðir and the Route 1 ringroad. There is a similar distance from Végarður by Fell to Fellabær, about 40 km (25 mi). From there an asphalt road leads to the harbour in Seyðisfjörður, Mjóeyri in Reyðarfjörður and the airfield in Egilsstaðir. In addition, there is an asphalt highland road up to the heathland and Kárahnjúkar, as well as a gravel road from there to Jökuldalur. From the highland route, designated 4 wheel drive trails can be accessed that lead to mountain cabins, such as at Fjallaskarð, Snæfell, Geldingafell and other places in the highlands of Fljótsdalur.

=== Footpaths, riding paths and cycle routes ===
Within the municipality of Fljótsdalur there are footpaths with marker posts that lead to such unique nature marvels as Hengifoss, Strútsfoss and Gjáhjalli. Tröllkonustígur (Troll woman path), Fossaganga (Waterfall walk) along Jökulsá í Norðurdal, and Fossahringur (Waterfall circle route) starting at Laugarfell, and various routes at Snæfell. There are also cross country ski paths that start at Lau gafell and the Wilderness Centre when conditions are favourable. For horseback riding there are routes through the forest Hallormsstaðaskógur and the valley Fljótsdalur on a gravel path at Hrafnkelsstaðir. Old travel and trading routes lie to Gautavík in Berufjörður, over Víðidalur and passing over Fljótsdalsheiði to Hrafnkelsdalur and Jökuldalur. The valley and heathland has mountain bike paths that are clearly marked, with coordinates that can be viewed online. A very popular option is to bike the circle route around Lagarfljót and the Fljótsdalur circle route. Since 2012 the popular cycling race Tour de Ormurinn has been held in mid August, on a route that extends as far as the North valley.

== Labour market ==
=== Human resources ===
In the municipality of Fljótsdalur, the population was recorded at about 100 individuals on 1 January 2021, 67 men and 31 women. A substantial number of people from the neighbouring municipality comes to work in the municipality of Fljótsdalur, especially in connection with the National Power Company plant, Skriðuklaustur and Snæfellsstofa. Similarly, inhabitants of the municipality of Fljótsdalur go to work in other municipalities. In 2018, the total number of man years in the municipality was defined at 52, whereas in January 2021 the total number was 55, according to the Directorate of Labour. In the spring of 2021, a survey was also conducted for the companies and institutions in the municipality, and here the findings are used for reference regarding whole year jobs in 2021 and the additional number required for 2026. The majority of jobs are in connection with the public sector and sheep farming, but the increase in economic activity is mostly due to tourism services and derived agricultural jobs. There is hardly any unemployment in the municipality.

=== Services ===
The municipality of Fljótsdalur provides a variety of services to its residents with regard to administration and construction, transportation, waste collection, sheep gathering and more. It guarantees mandatory basic education services through a cooperation agreement with Múlaþing. Health care services and other support services such as banks, post office and shops are obtained from Egilsstaðir. Egilsstaðir has a Department of Civil Protection and Emergency control center, a police station and a fire department. The municipality of Fljótsdalur works together with Austurbrú and the residents on a community project that aims at strengthening and supporting the community and finding the future potential for the region. The municipality encourages its residents to seek education, engage in entrepreneurship and improve the environment through various endeavours and grant offers.

=== Government institutions ===
The municipality of Fljótsdalur had the highest number of jobs per capita (22.4%) in 2019, a total of 15 full time equivalent units. This is due to employment offered by the National Power Company in the Fljótsdalur plant, by Vatnajökull National Park in Snæfellsstofa, and the full-time jobs offered by Gunnarsstofnun (the Gunnar Gunnarsson Institute) at Skriðuklaustur.

Gunnarsstofnun is run as a private non profit institution with a specific organisational chart and defined budget. Gunnarsstofnun has the use and care of Skriðuklaustur, where the Institute runs a culture and education center with cultural activities all the year round, such as exhibitions, concerts, lectures and other events. This is a full year endeavour that employs a director and caretaker in addition to employing people over the summer months and for specific tasks.

Landsvirkjun, the National Power Company operates the Fljótsdalur plant, the largest power plant in the country, with 690 GW of installed capacity and the ability to generate 4,800 GW hours of electricity per year. About 15 individuals work in the plant in fixed shifts.

Vatnajökull National Park covers an area of over 14,141 km^{2} (5,460 sq mi) and is among the biggest national parks in Europe. The National Park's visitor centre, Snæfellsstofa, is located at Skriðuklaustur. There the Park has an information center, a souvenir shop and an exhibition, and it is also the base for the supervision of walkers' huts in the highlands. There is a National Park Director, Assistant Park Director and a number of Park Rangers working in the Park.

At Végarður public workers can avail themselves of work facilities, for example the employees in Austurbrú, who provide services in connection with the economy, education and culture in East Iceland. Embassy attachés and employees from various companies, pioneers in different fields and university students have also used these facilities.

== Commerce ==
In Fljótsdalur, most companies are concerned with farming, processing of raw materials, and tourism services.

Fljótsdalur is the location of considerable contracting activities, such as in earthmoving work, snow clearing, carpentry, car repairs and custom building in connection with farming.

== Opportunities ==
The community in Fljótsdalur looks to the future and has worked on the community project Bright future of Fljótsdalur. Forward looking and targeted steps are taken towards further development of the community. The following contains a list of the opportunities in the region, based on an analysis in connection with that project.

=== Food production ===
Sheep farming is the principal branch of agriculture. There are various opportunities with regard to the use of products and development of various commodities involving meat, milk, wool, bones and other items that become available. Projects involving sheep milk from the area have been successful and met with positive reactions. Nearby, there is access to an experimental kitchen in the former Hallormsstaður school, which offers sustainability and creativity studies. The school provides guidance and officially recognised facilities that enable new opportunities to be explored in the local area. There are also basic facilities available for food processing in the kitchen at Végarður.

Similarly, there are opportunities inherent in horse and cattle breeding. The use of farms for educational purposes and as part of treatment resources can also be considered, with emphasis on encouraging people to enter the labour market or empower them mentally and physically.

The region supports wildlife such as rock ptarmigans, geese, and reindeer. Several lakes on the Fljótsdalsheiði heath contain fish, with fishing licenses sold at Kelduá in the southern valley. The area is used for game hunting, angling, and outdoor tourism activities near local landmarks such as Hengifoss.

There has been a great increase in the use of herbs for human consumption, also among the local restaurants. Commodities have been produced for sale using rock bramble, rhubarb, mushrooms and other raw materials. Experiments have also been done with growing barley for beer production, cultivating rose wort for food supplements among many other efforts. Various opportunities are therefore available in the use of wild vegetation and cultivation of plants, whether for specific products, for admixture, food or handicraft of any form.

The municipality of Fljótsdalur is considered to be well suited for the cultivation of corn, such as barley, oats, rapeseed and hops. These opportunities consist of local cultivation and cooperative processing and marketing efforts.

=== Forestry ===
The valley is a great repository of knowledge in the field of forestry, as the people of Fljótsdalur were the first to begin organised commercial forestry in Iceland. Cultivation of forests for the production of wood has been going on for 50 years. Christmas trees have been produced for a long time and there is room for increasing that production, and also to combine efforts to further improve the quality of the trees and their commercial value. Forest areas include a considerable amount of undergrowth that can be used for pasturing, such as mushrooms, rock bramble, medicinal herbs and herbs suitable as food supplements. It is a custom in the region to use the sap, branches, bark, cones and other parts of birch trees for coloring, tanning or food artistry. There is potential for the sale of carbon units through forestry and there are also various, hitherto unexplored, options whereby forestry could be connected with tourism and outdoor activities.

=== Industry ===
There are forestry concerns in Fljótsdalur that include the production of parquet, paneling, decking material, fence posts and firewood that is provided to the major pizzerias in the country. Thus there are opportunities inherent in further processing of Icelandic wood. The varied forms of agriculture in the valley additionally offer different processing of agriculture related products, not least in connection with sheep, for example meat processing, the use of wool and tanning of hides. There are opportunities with regard to other branches of agriculture that go unexplored. Processing and completion of wild game products remain among the unexplored options, even in such close proximity to some of the major hunting grounds in the country. The municipality has the largest power plant in the country, Fljótsdalsstöð.

=== Tourism ===
There are many and diverse opportunities in connection with tourism, not least when considering the proximity to Vatnajökull National Park and the Eyjabakkar area. The nature of the area is quite unique, as is the local wild animal and bird life. Tourists have flocked to Hengifoss, although their dispersion throughout the valley has been limited. This means that there are opportunities to offer information there regarding other recreational activities and services throughout the region, by providing a staffed service building. Restaurant services are quite sought after between April and October, but at other times it is limited to group bookings. More recreational activities can be offered in the area, both in summer and winter. The area is suitable for water sports, hikes, mountain walks, riding trips, hunting trips, bird watching and other activities. There are numerous opportunities for establishing round the year tourism and to increase the use of buildings connected with the tourisms try, such as the mountain hotel Laugarfell and the mountain cabins in the highland area.
