= Systrafoss =

Coordinates: 63°47′9.41″N 18°3′34.71″W

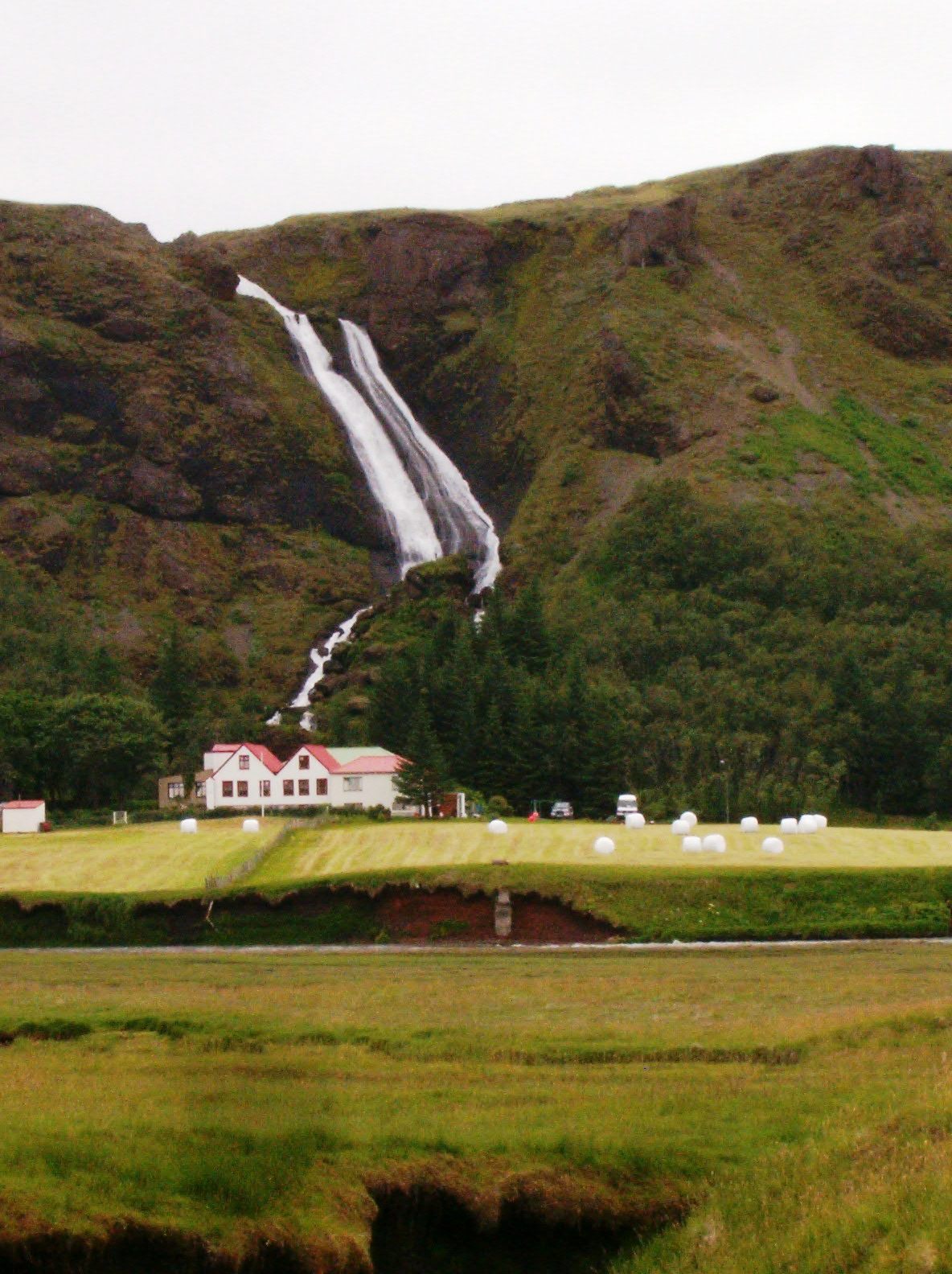
- Location: South of Iceland
- Number of drops: 2

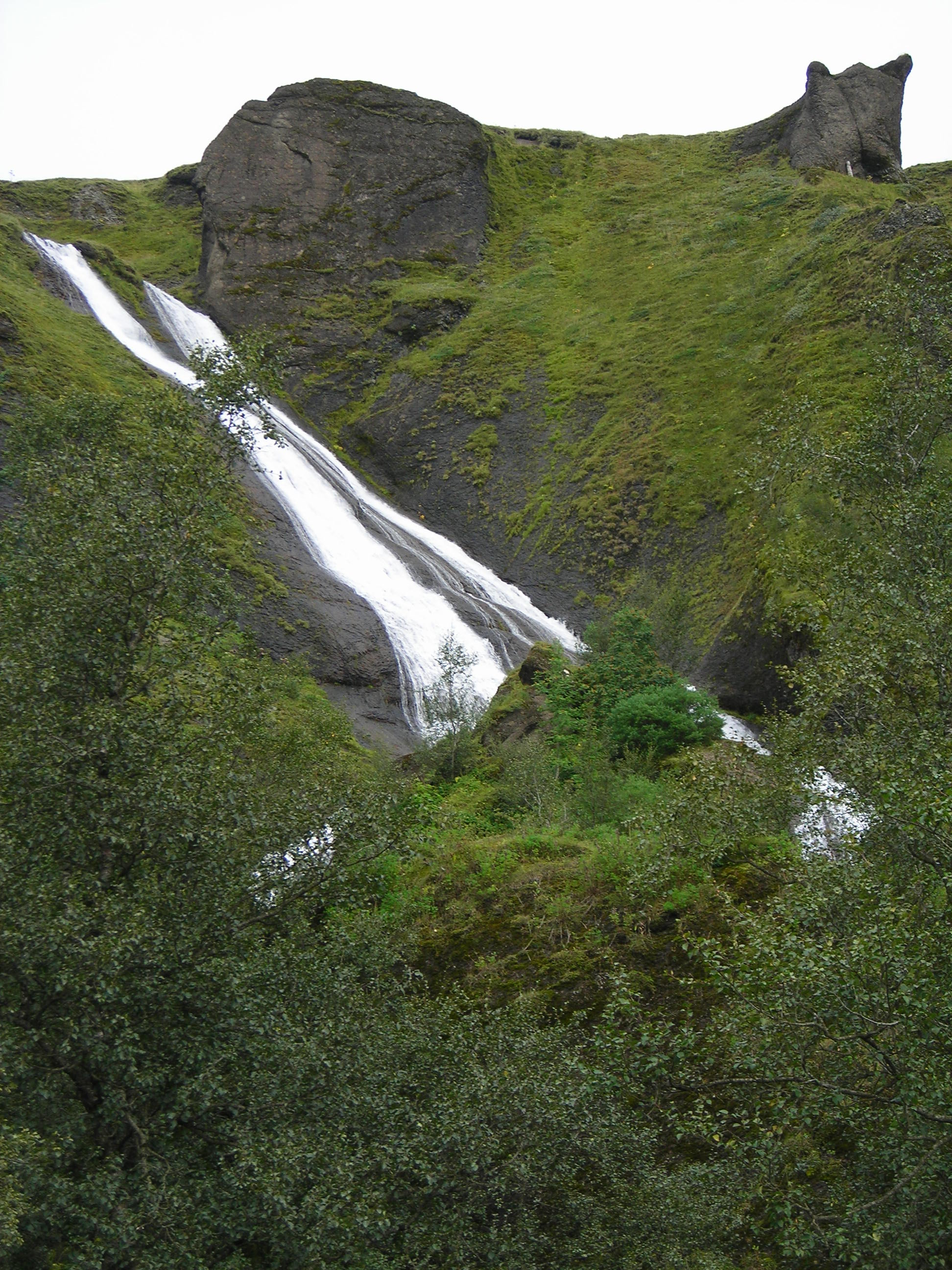
Systrafoss close-up

Systrafoss (Icelandic pronunciation: [ˈsɪstraˌfɔsː], "sisters' waterfall") is a waterfall in Iceland, found at Kirkjubæjarklaustur in Skaftárhreppur in the Suðurland region.

== Geography ==
The waterfall is part of the river Fossá, which runs south from its source Systravatn. To the south of Systrafoss runs the glacial river Skaftá.

== Name ==
Both the waterfall and Systravatn take their name from the sisters of the nearby Kirkjubæjar Abbey.

== See also ==
- List of waterfalls
- List of waterfalls of Iceland

== Sources ==
- Jens Willhardt, Christine Sadler: Island. 3rd edn. Michael Müller, Erlangen 2003, ISBN 3-89953-115-9, p. 346f.
- Borowski, Birgit (ed.): Lonely Planet Publications Ltd. Melbourne: Island. 3rd German edn, Sept. 2013, ISBN 978-3-8297-2310-7, p. 285
