= Fagrifoss =

Waterfall in Iceland

Coordinates: 63°52′01″N 18°15′00″W

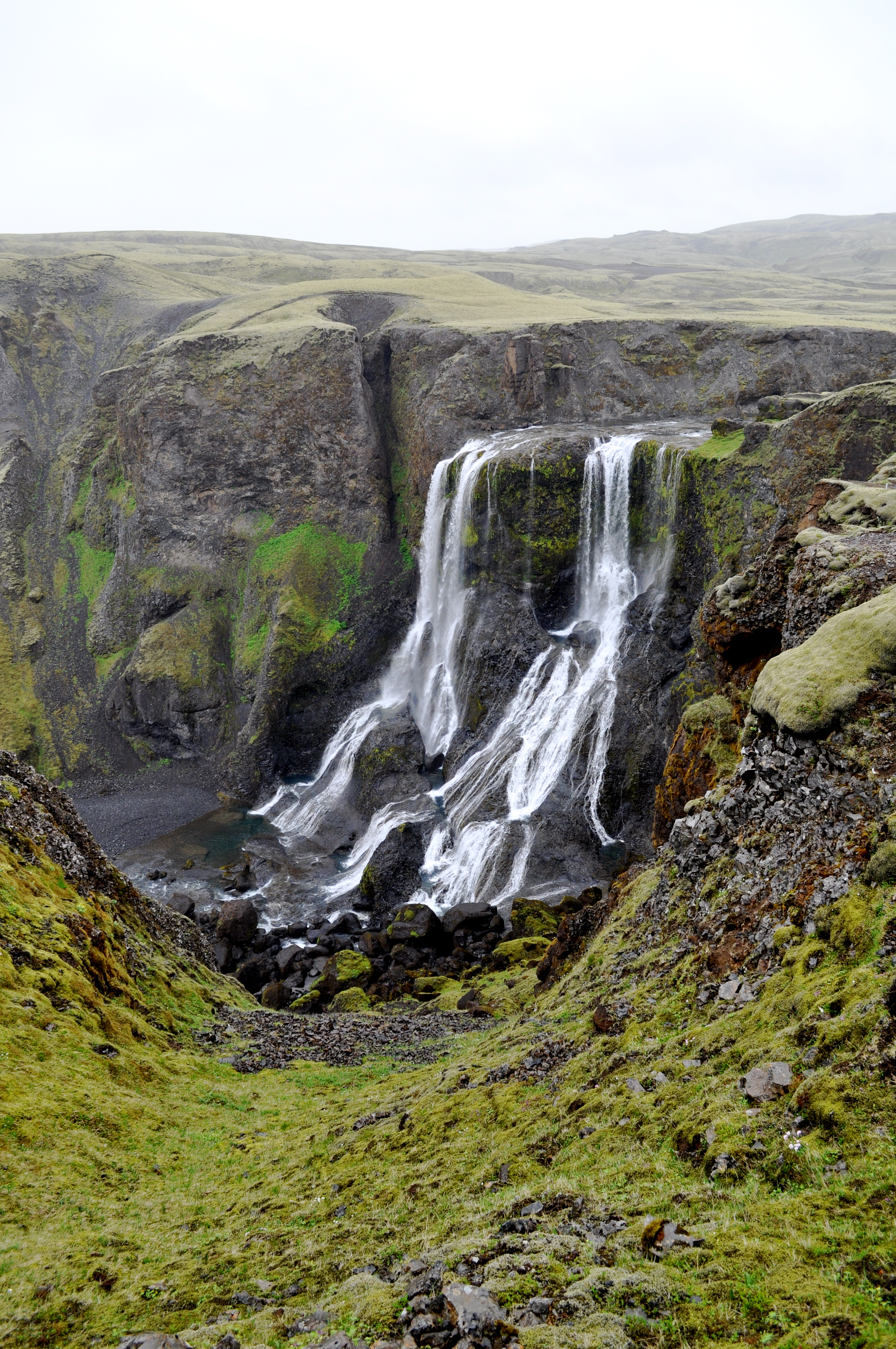
- Fagrifoss
- Location: Highland
- Number of drops: 1

Fagrifoss is a waterfall located in the Highland in Iceland. It is almost on the road leading to Lakagígar craters on road F206.24 km (15 mi) from Kirkjubæjarklaustur and 40 km (25 mi) from Laki. Access to the waterfall requires the crossing of a river ford, for which a 4x4 vehicle is needed.

== See also ==
- List of waterfalls
- List of waterfalls of Iceland
