= Gluggafoss =

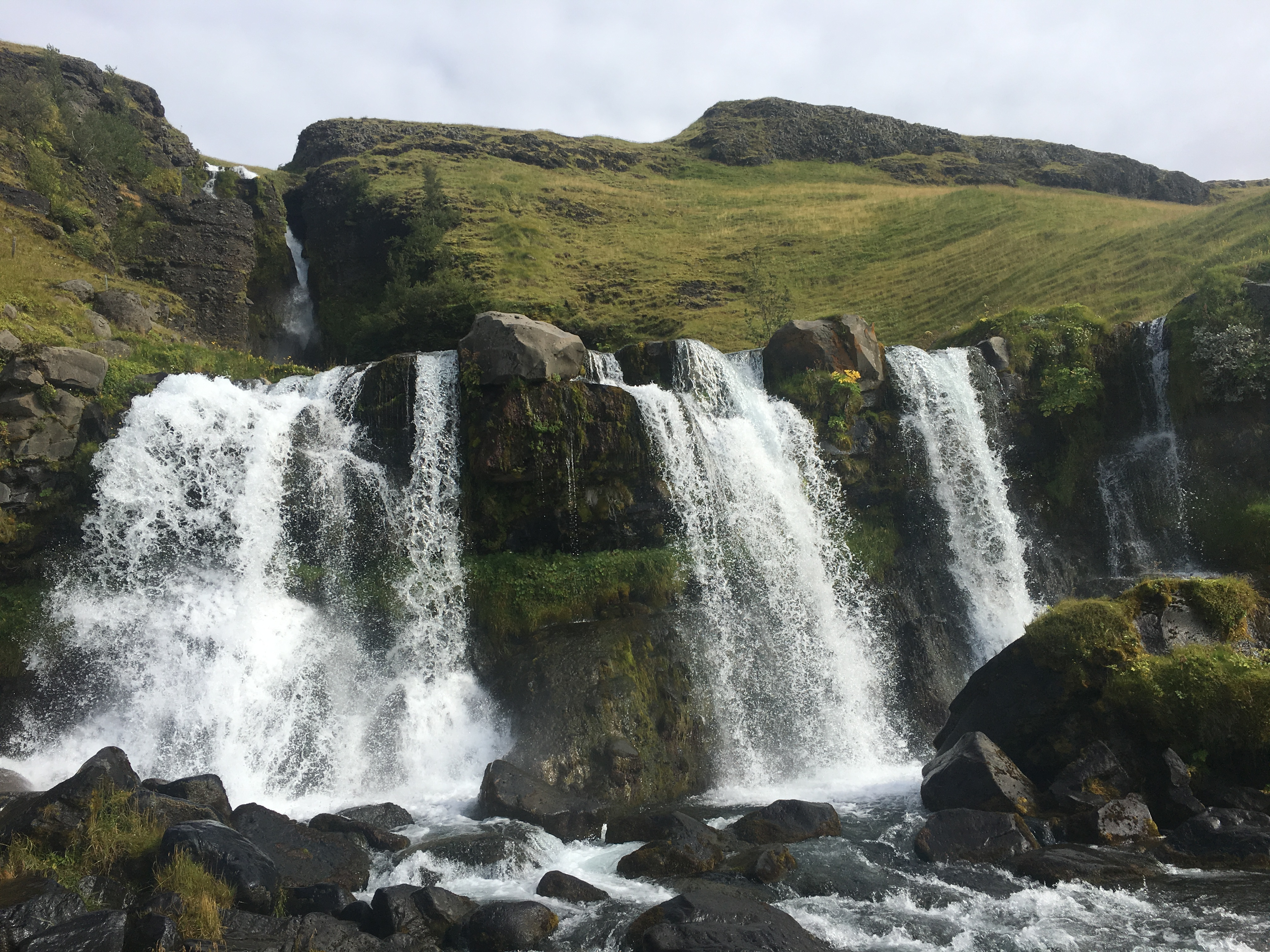
- Gluggafoss waterfall
- Location: 63.7200°N 19.8927°W
- Total height: 52 m (171 ft)
- Number of drops: 2

Gluggafoss (Icelandic pronunciation: [ˈklʏkːaˌfɔsː]) is a waterfall in southern Iceland, specifically in the Fljótshlíð area. As the most prominent member of a series of waterfalls running from the river Merkjá [ˈmɛr̥cauː], it is also known as Merkjárfoss [ˈmɛr̥caurˌfɔsː]; both names are acknowledged on an on-site signpost. The waterfall is accessible off Route 261, some 17.3 km (10.7 mi) from the closest major town, Hvolsvöllur (which in turn is 106 km (66 mi) east of Reykjavík).

Gluggafoss has a total height of approximately 52 m (171 ft) and features two main drops: one for 44 m (144 ft) into a narrow recess, then another for a further 8.5 m (28 ft) (in three main channels). The cliff supporting Gluggafoss has an upper palagonite (or tuff rock) portion and a lower basalt portion. Distinctive of Gluggafoss' geology are the holes and tunnels formed by the river through the soft palagonite. Known in Icelandic as gluggar, or 'windows', these holes allow observers at the base of the waterfall to see partly obscured water flow. According to the on-site signpost, the upper half of the waterfall could be seen only through three such vertically arranged holes prior to 1947. Hekla, roughly 30 km (19 mi) north-northeast, erupted in that year, filling the river Merkjá and the tunnels of Gluggafoss with volcanic ash; this severely diminished the waterfall's exterior visibility for decades. Since then, however, erosion has undone the blockages.

Small trails on the adjacent hills allow visitors to see both drops of the waterfall up close, and also to obtain a view from above. Seljalandsfoss is another waterfall nearby and of similar (or larger) size.

== Gallery ==
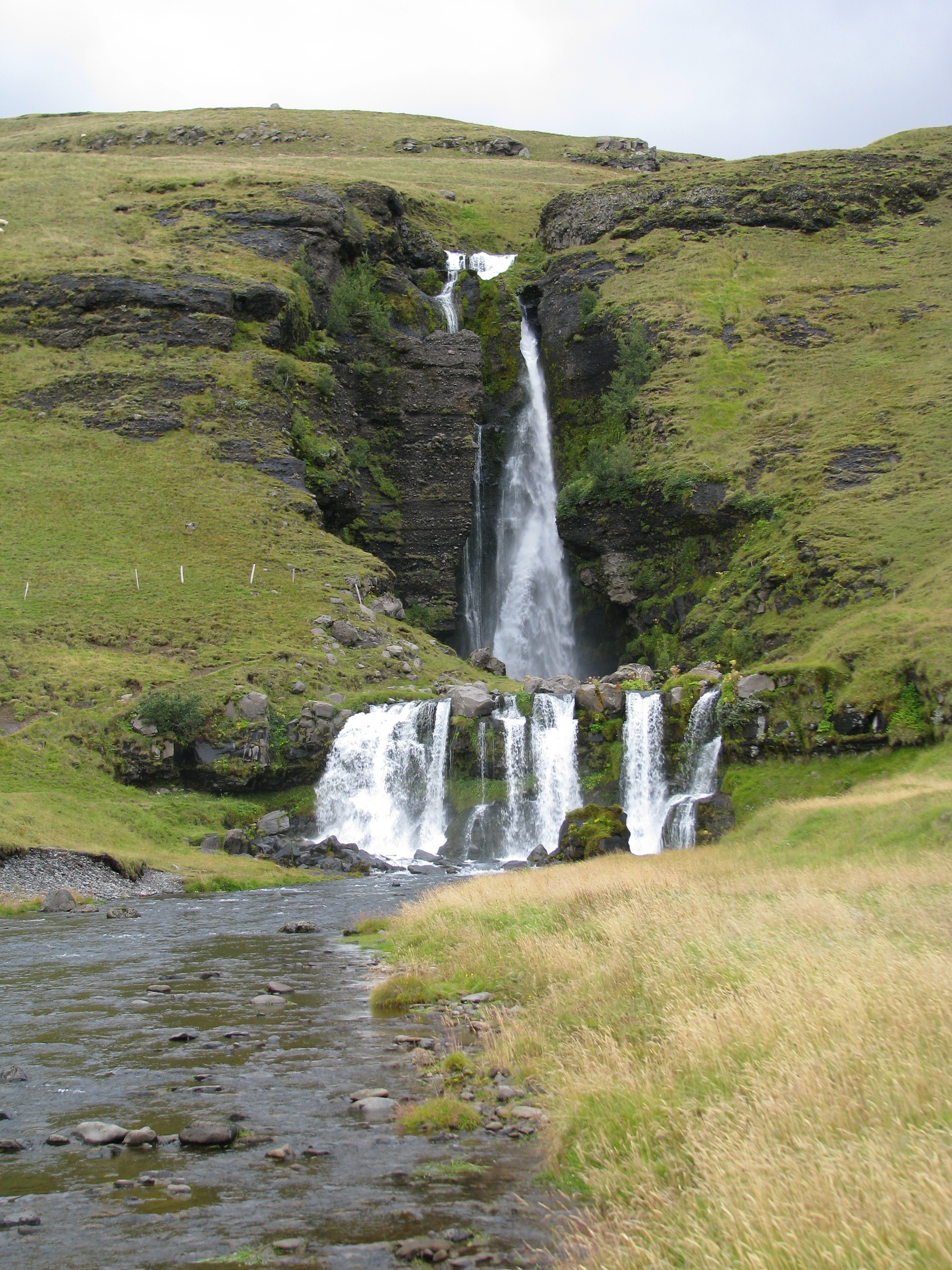
View from base

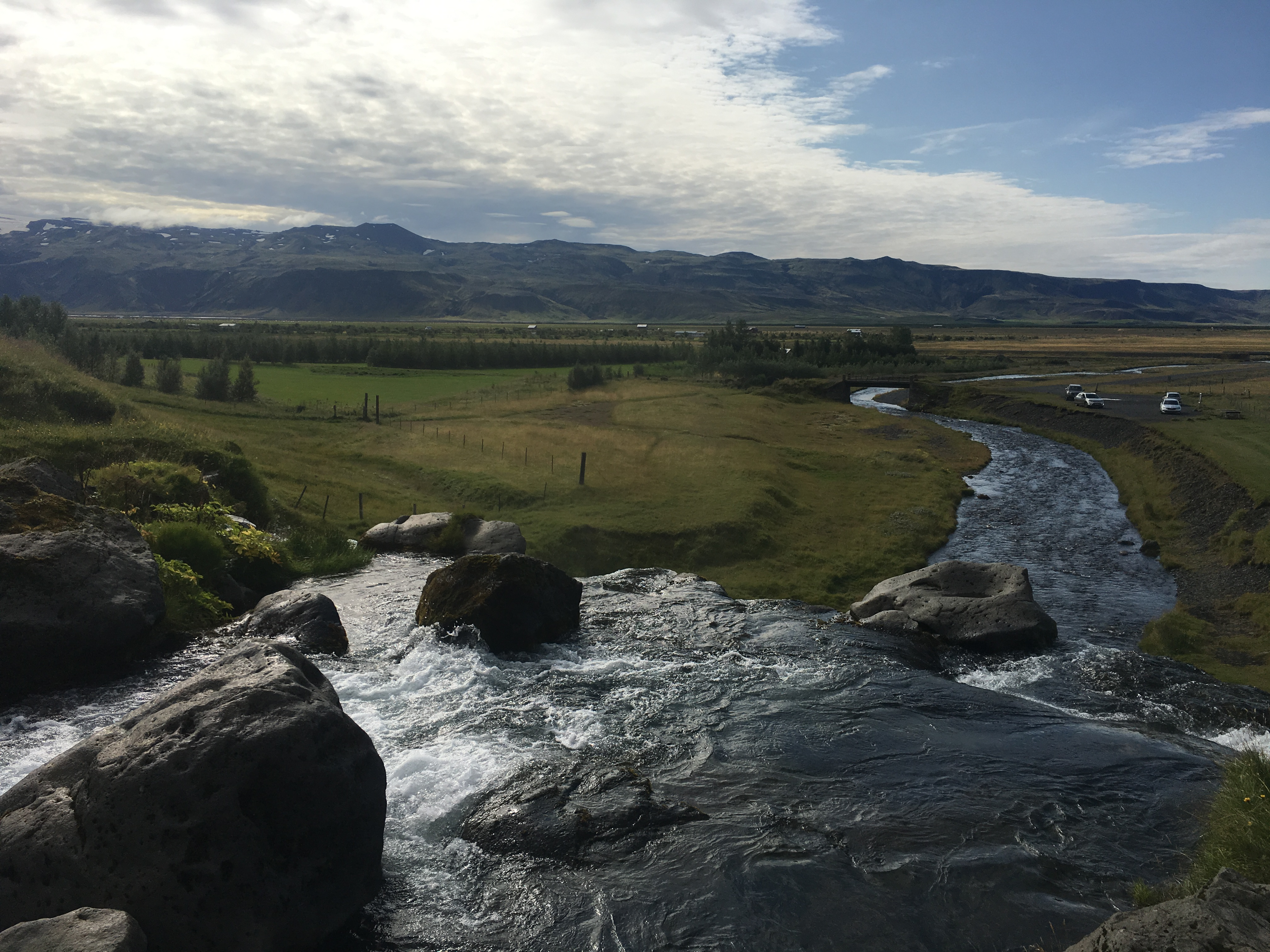
View of the river Merkjá over the second drop

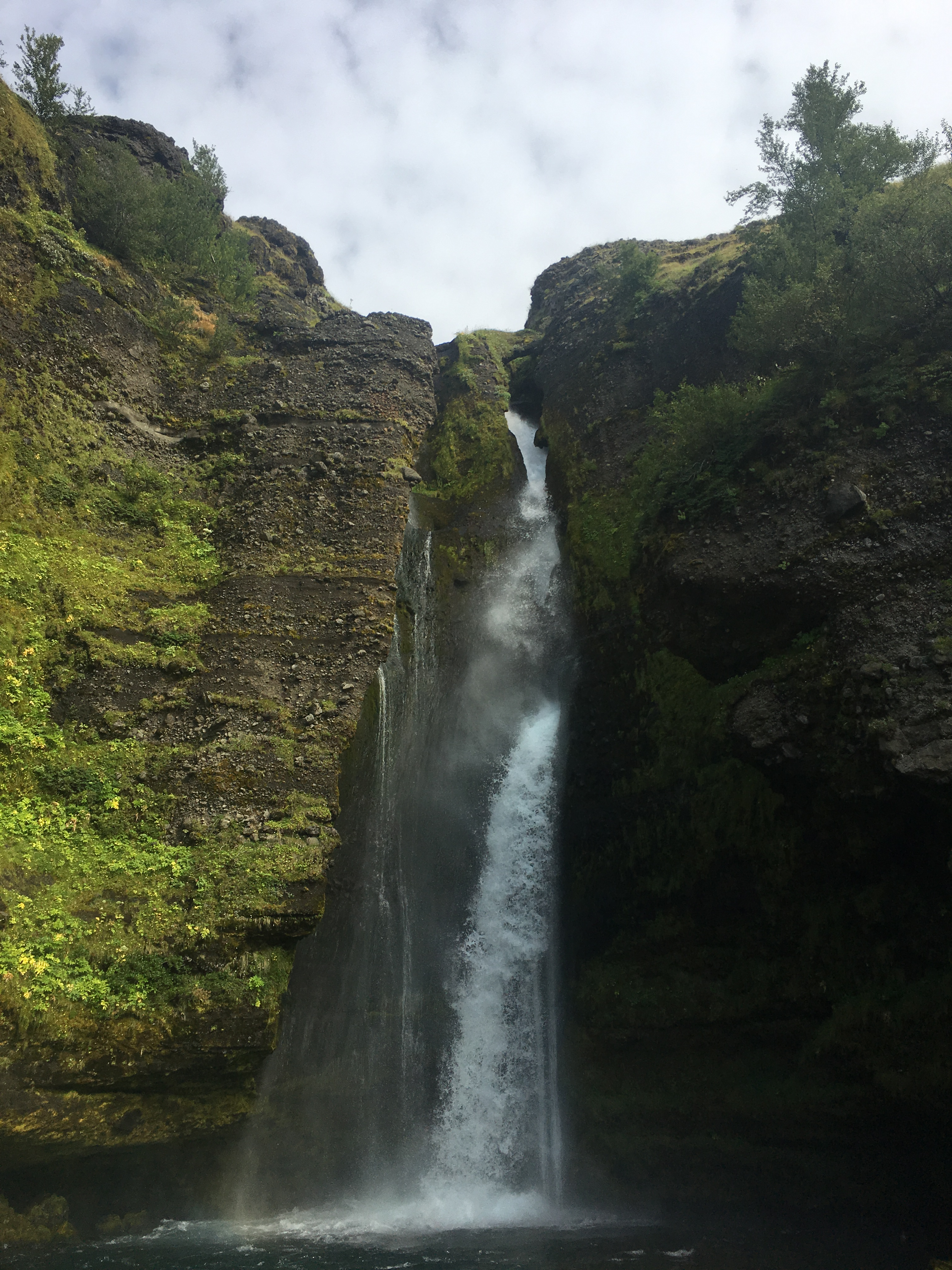
The higher drop

== See also ==
- Waterfalls of Iceland
- List of waterfalls
