= Granni Waterfall =

Waterfall in Iceland

Granni
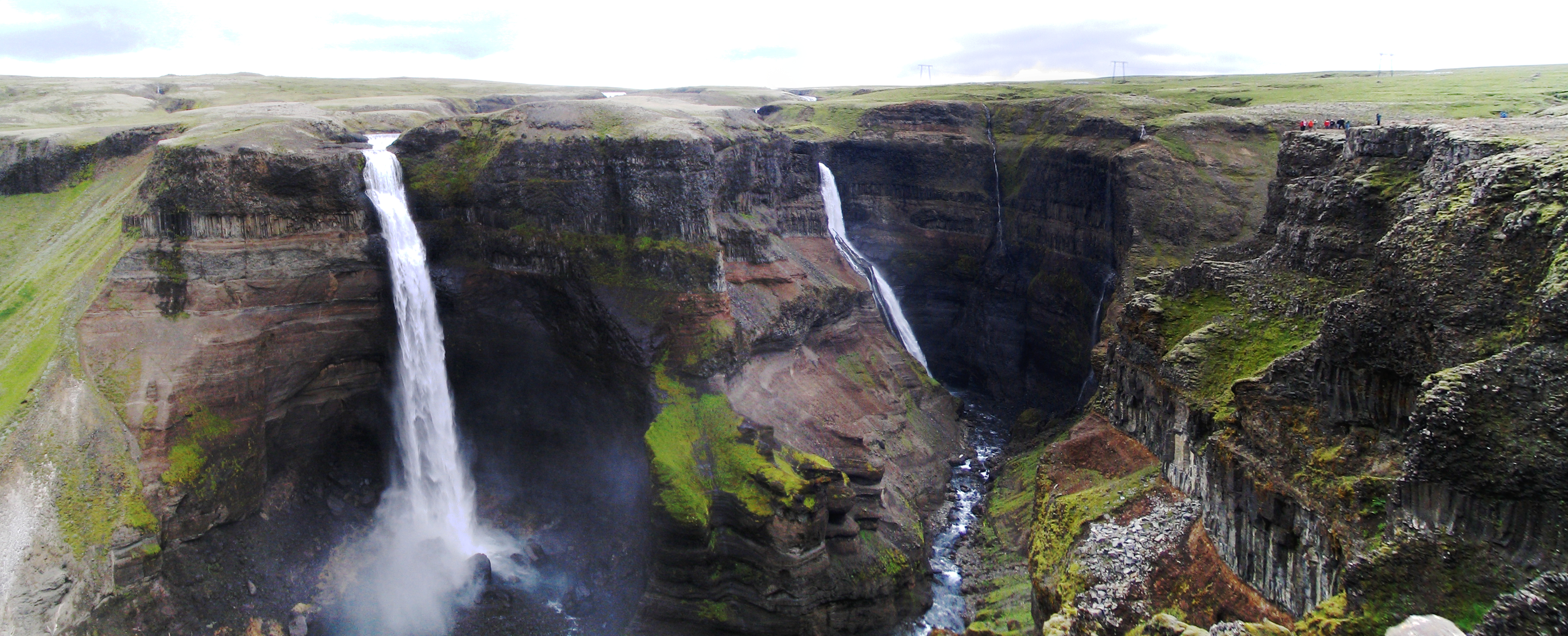
- Háifoss (left) and Granni (right)

- Location within Iceland
- Location: Iceland
- Coordinates: 64°12′33″N 19°41′01″W
- Total height: 101 m (331 ft)
- Number of drops: 2

The Granni (Icelandic pronunciation: [ˈkranːɪ]) is a waterfall that cascades into the Fossardalur right beside the Háifoss.

== History ==
These two waterfalls did not have a name until the beginning of the 19th century, but Nágranni or granni is the Icelandic word for neighbor while Hái means tall. The name of the waterfall is based on the proximity to the neighbouring waterfall Háifoss, which is less than 250 meters away and fed by the same river. The river Fossá í Þjórsárdal is divided into two arms some 750 meters upstream from the waterfalls. Granni has a height of 101 meters and less power than the 122 meters high Háifoss. Downstream at the bottom the two separate rivers converge again into the Fossa river. Both waterfalls can be seen from a sightseeing platform which is on the south side of the falls. The volcano Hekla is within sight in the background.

== See also ==
- List of waterfalls
- Waterfalls of Iceland
