= Kirkjubæjar Abbey =

12th-century Icelandic monastery

Kirkjubæjar Abbey (Icelandic: Kirkjubæjarklaustur), in operation from 1186 until the Icelandic Reformation, was a monastery in Iceland of nuns of the Order of St. Benedict. It was located at Kirkjubæjarklaustur. Iceland had nine religious communities before the Reformation, two of which were monasteries of nuns, of which this is the first and oldest.

In contrast to the other women's monastery in Iceland, Reynistaðarklaustur (1295–1563), which was placed under the authority of the Bishop of Hólar, at Kirkjubæjar Abbey the Abbess was left in full authority over the community, free of episcopal oversight.

== History ==
The Abbey was founded in 1186. The first abbess was Halldóra Eyjólfsdóttir, who died in 1210. The abbey was regarded as a center of culture and literature.

In the mid-14th-century, the abbey was given a name of being in opposition to the Pope. A nun named Karin or Kristin held what was heretic sermons in the convent. She was put on trial on charges of having sold her soul to the Devil, of carrying the Blessed Sacrament outside the church, having carnal knowledge with men and speaking blasphemously of the Pope. She was sentenced guilty as charged of heresy and fornication and executed by burning. This event reportedly occurred in 1343. This event became the subject of legend and the nun in question was split in two: one executed for fornication, and the other one for heresy. After the Icelandic Reformation, the latter nun was vindicated, and flowers are said to bloom on her grave, but not that of the first nun. The Systrastapi (Sister's rock) is where one of the nuns of the Abbey was buried after being burned at the stake.

In 1402, most of the abbey's servants and many nuns died of the plague, and the nuns themselves were, for a period, forced to tend to the cattle. This they are said to have done badly, as the majority of them were from wealthy families and unused to manual labor.

=== Dissolution ===
During the Icelandic Reformation, Kirkjubæjar Abbey was declared dissolved and the property of the king and banned from accepting new novices, but the former nuns were allowed to remain in the building if they wished. At the time of the reformation, the reformation bishop Gissur Einarsson had two relatives in the convent, as his sister was a nun there and his aunt its abbess.

The former nuns are last mentioned in 1544, when six of them, Guðríður, Oddný (sister of the reformation bishop Gissur Einarsson) Arnleif, Ástríður, Margrét and Valgerður were still in residence in the abbey buildings with their abbess Halldóra Sigvaldadóttir.

== Legacy ==
The place names of Systrafoss ('Waterfall of the Sisters') and of Lake Systravatn ('Water of the Sisters') in the mountains above the village refer to this abbey. Folk tales illustrate history with stories about both good and bad nuns.

Systravatn also has a legend related to the cloister. The nuns traditionally bathed in the lake, and one day two nuns saw a hand with a gold ring extending from the water. When they tried to seize the ring, they were dragged below the water and drowned.

== See also ==
- Kirkjubæjarbók
