= Hengifoss =

Waterfall in Iceland

Coordinates: 65°5′43″N 14°53′23″W

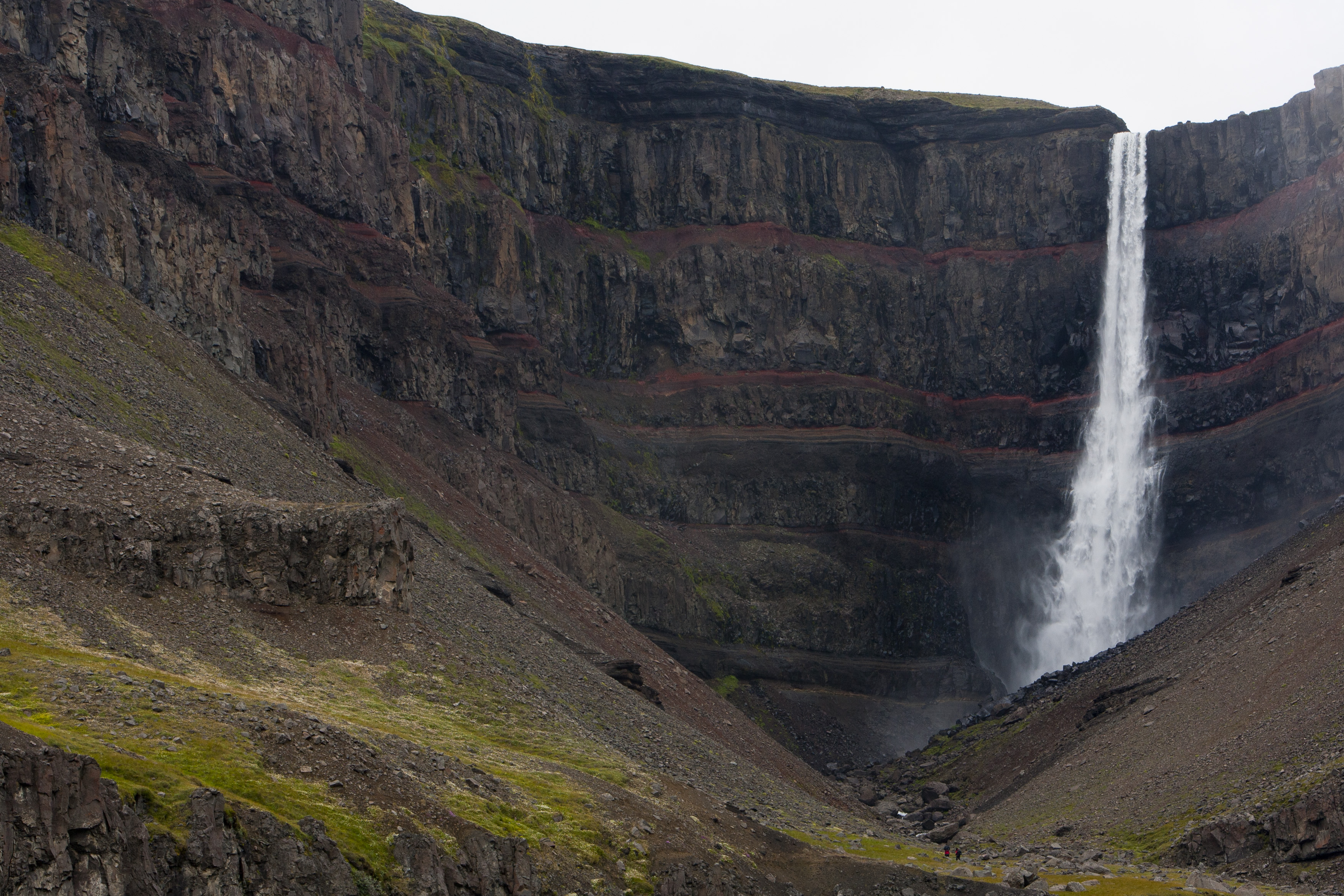
- Location: East of Iceland
- Total height: 128 metres (420 ft)

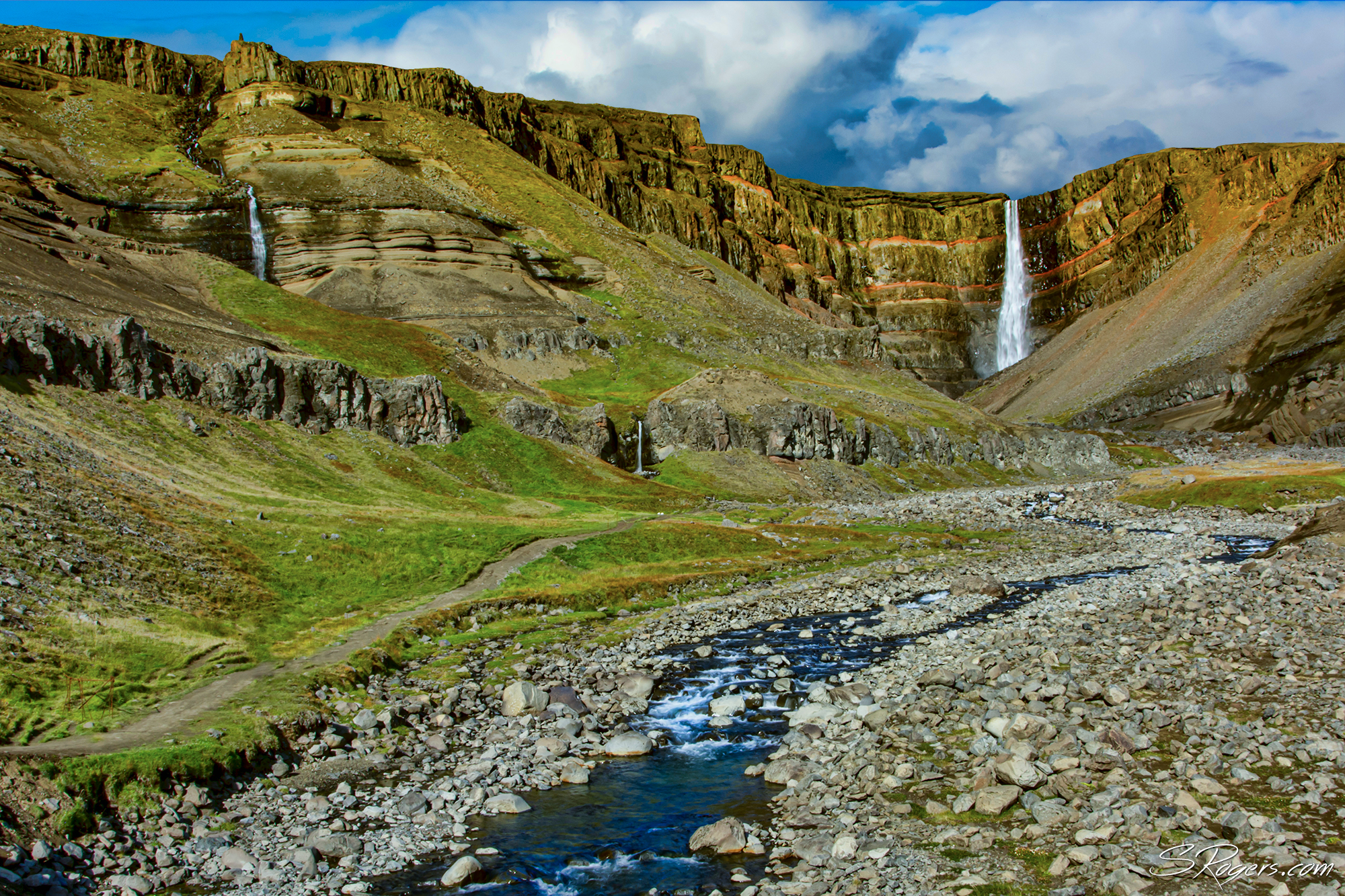
Hengifoss - September 2019

Hengifoss (Icelandic pronunciation: [ˈheiɲcɪˌfɔsː]) is the third highest waterfall in Iceland, 128 meters. It is located in Hengifossá in Fljótsdalshreppur, East Iceland. It is surrounded by basaltic strata with thin, red layers of clay between the basaltic layers. Fossilized trunks of coniferous trees, sensitive to cold, and lignite, which depict warmer climates during the latter part of Tertiary. Further down the Hengifossá river is Litlanesfoss, notable for the columnar jointed volcanics around it. Hengifoss is the most popular hiking site in East Iceland with path leading from the parking lot to the falls. It takes 40–60 minutes to walk to the waterfall.

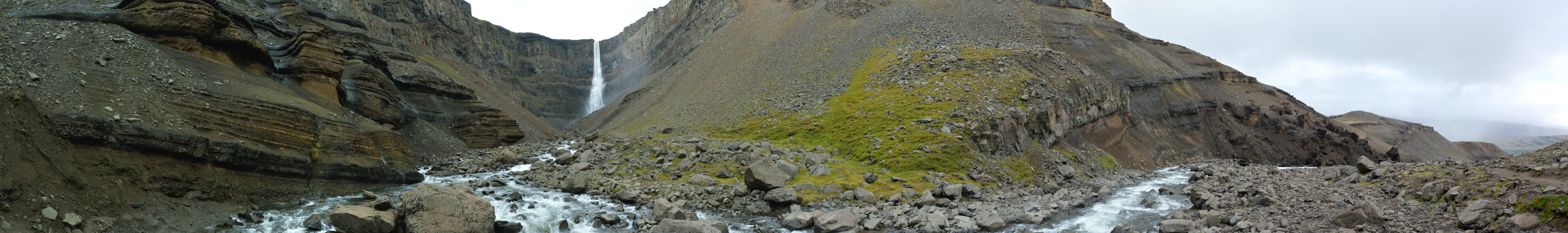
Hengifoss

== See also ==
- List of waterfalls
- List of waterfalls in Iceland
