= Faxi =

Coordinates: 64.2256°N 20.3381°W

Faxi, or Vatnsleysufoss
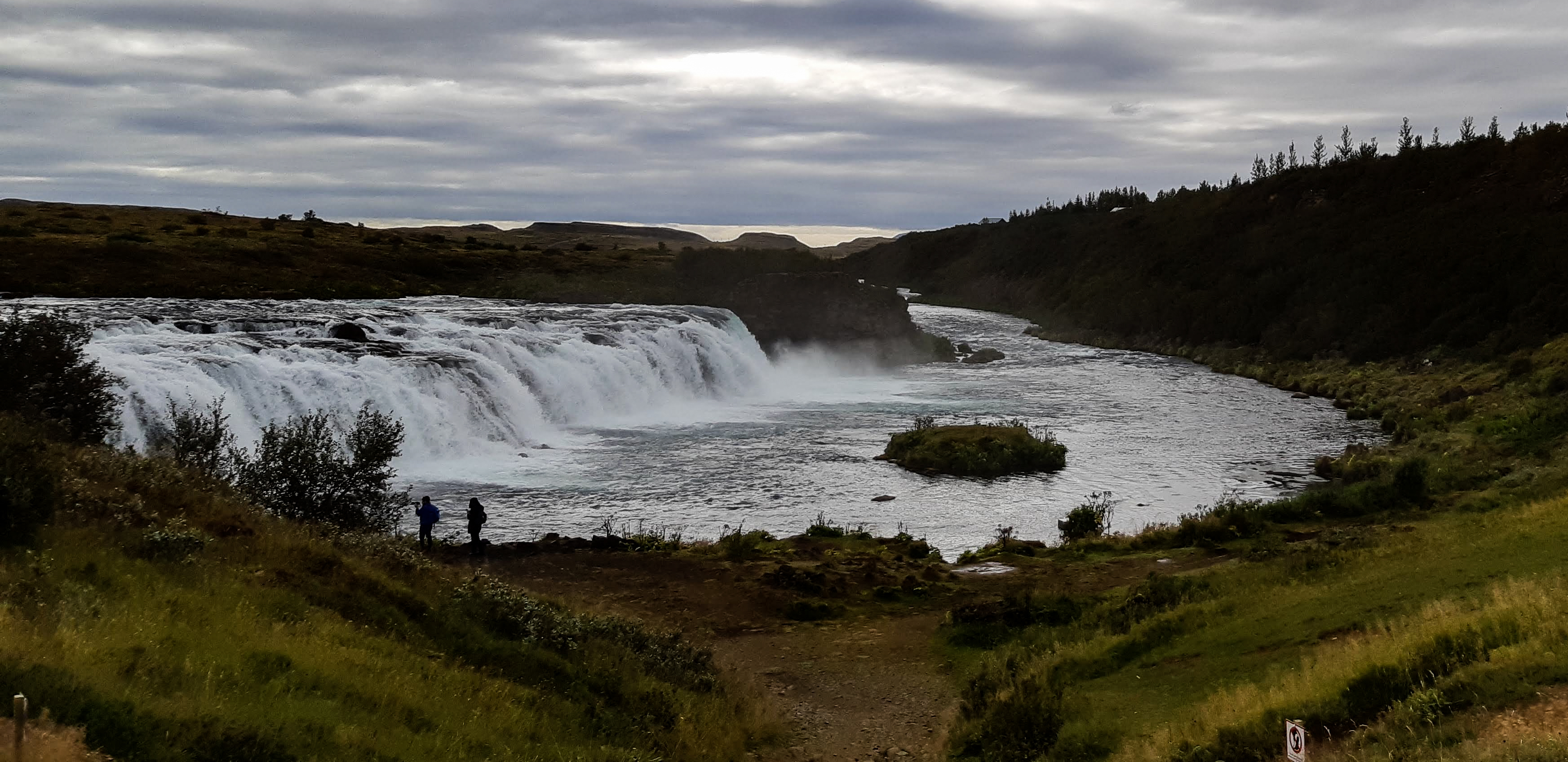
- Location: South of Iceland
- Number of drops: 1

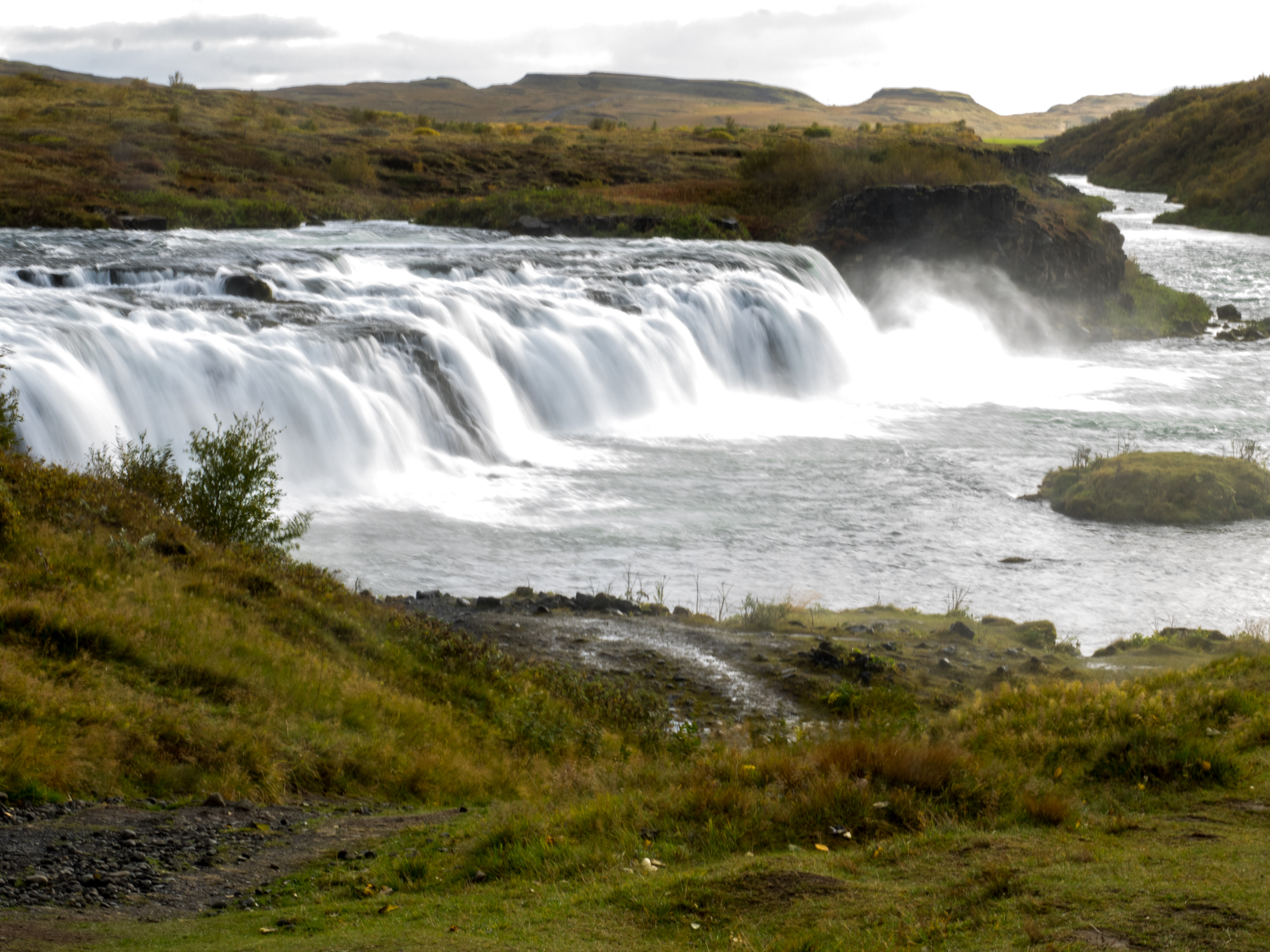
Side Profile of the Waterfall (Sept 2016)

The Faxi (Icelandic pronunciation: [ˈfaksɪ], or Vatnsleysufoss [ˈvasːˌleiːsʏˌfɔsː]) waterfall is located on the Golden Circle, a popular tourist trail approximately 120 km east of Reykjavik. The waterfall is located on the Tungufljót river, a tributary of the river Hvita.

Faxi can be found around twelve kilometres from Geysir, 21 kilometers from Gullfoss, and 17 kilometres from Skalholt, away from the main road on a gravel track which includes a picnic area and a small car park. It is also close to the village of Reykholt, and 60km from the þingvellir National Park, a UNESCO World Heritage Site. The waterfall itself is located in the municipality of Bláskógabyggð.

The waterfall is approximately 7 meters high, and 91 meters wide, and can be viewed from an observation platform.

The waterfall is full of salmon, and features a fish ladder constructed to aid salmon in their upstream migration, serving a crucial role in preserving the salmon population in the Tungfljót river. Due to the salmon presence, it is a popular spot for fishing. Close to the waterfall is a restaurant called Við Faxa. There is also a rich presence of native birds, and a large variety of flowers and shrubs, nourished by the spray and mist from the waterfall.

The name Faxi comes from the Icelandic for "the mane of a horse", and signifies the waterfall's unique and gentle cascade, akin to a horse's mane fluttering in the wind.

== See also ==
- List of waterfalls
- Waterfalls of Iceland
