= Glymur =

Waterfall in Iceland

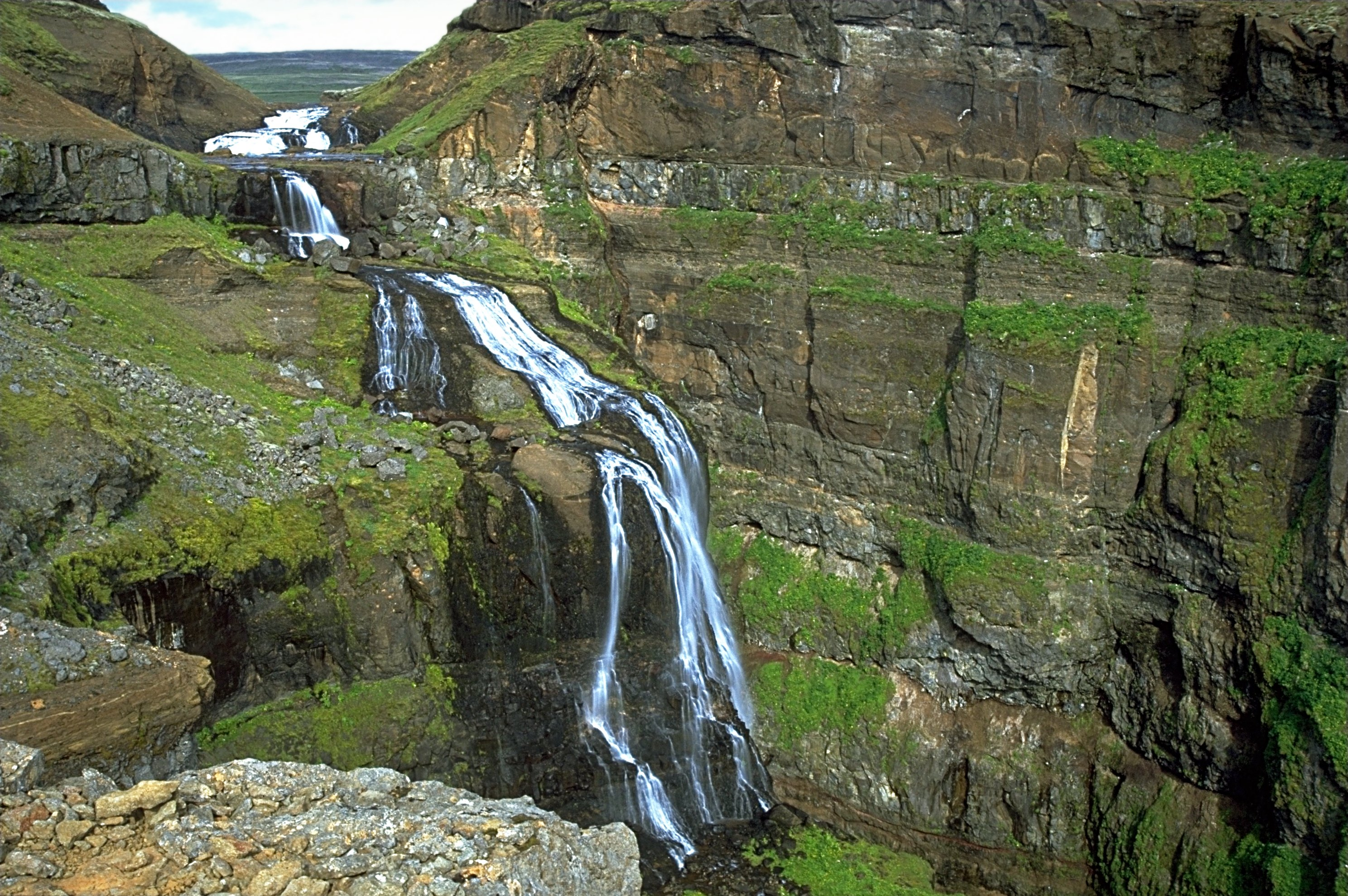

- Location within Iceland
- Location: Hvalfjarðarsveit, Vesturland, Iceland
- Coordinates: 64°23′45″N 21°14′28″W
- Type: Horsetail
- Total height: 198 m (650 ft)
- Number of drops: 1

Glymur (Icelandic pronunciation: [ˈklɪːmʏr̥]) is a waterfall in Hvalfjarðarsveit, Vesturland, Iceland. It is the second-tallest in the country with a cascade of 198 metres (650 ft). Glymur was long regarded as the tallest until being surpassed by Morsárfoss, a newly measured waterfall near Morsárjökull in 2011.

It is situated at the rear end of the Hvalfjörður. Since the opening of the Hvalfjörður Tunnel under this fjord, visitor numbers have dropped.

The river Botnsá [ˈpɔsːˌauː] runs from the Hvalvatn lake and after a short distance the water falls down alongside the Hvalfell mountain into a steep canyon. The waterfall can be accessed from a parking area at the end of the road. Hikers can view the waterfall from marked paths on the east side of the river Botnsá.

== Gallery ==
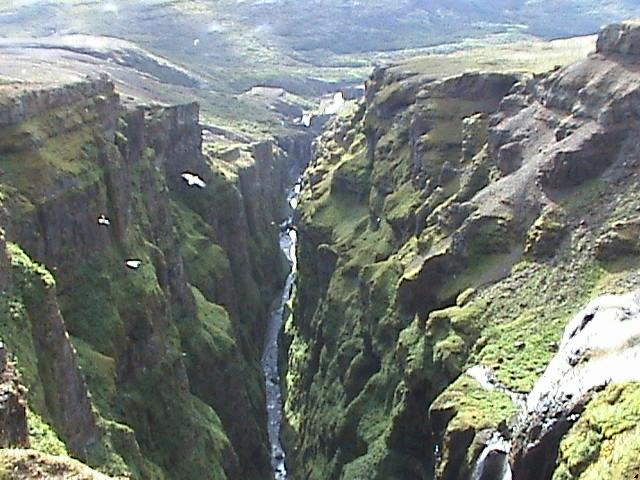
Downstream view of the canyon

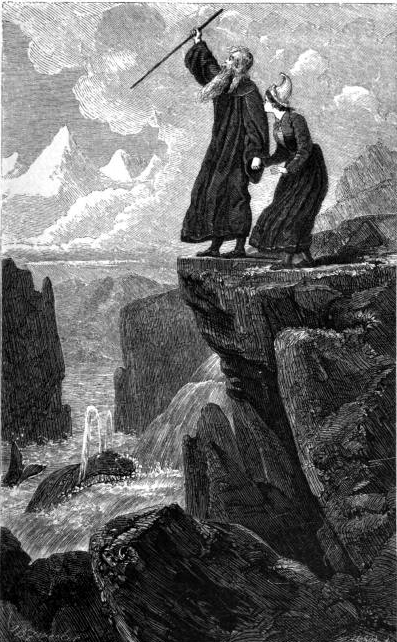
Legend of Rauðhöfði

The second picture is an engraving showing people trying to escape from a monster whale. It is an illustration of the Icelandic legend of Redhead (Rauðhöfði [ˈrœyðˌhœvðɪ]) which is said to be the cause of the formation of Glymur.

== See also ==
- List of waterfalls
- Waterfalls of Iceland
