= Litlanesfoss =

Waterfall in Iceland

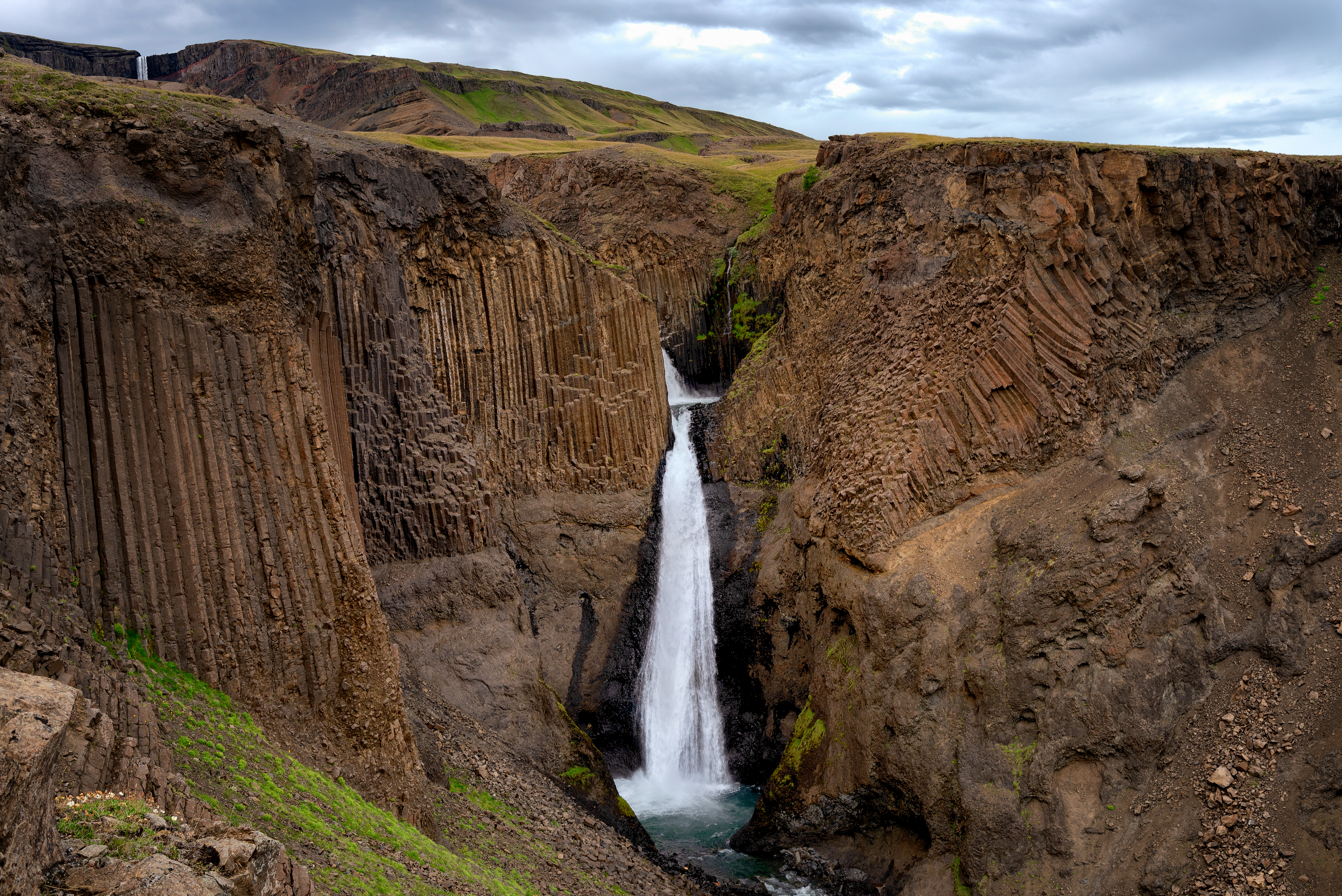

- Location within Iceland
- Location: East of Iceland
- Coordinates: 65°05′01″N 14°53′02″W
- Total height: 30 metres (98 ft)
- Number of drops: 2

Litlanesfoss (Icelandic pronunciation: [ˈlɪhtlaˌnɛsˌfɔsː]) is a waterfall in Hengifossá in Fljótsdalur, Eastern Iceland, also known as Stuðlabergsfoss [ˈstʏðlaˌpɛrksˌfɔsː, -ˌpɛr̥s-]. The waterfall is about 30 meters high and forms an apron in a cliff. The waterfall is in a large rock choir with an unusually regular supporting rock made of high and straight columns.

== See also ==
- List of waterfalls
- List of waterfalls in Iceland
