= Héraðsflói =

Bay in Iceland

Coordinates: 65.678°N 14.164°W

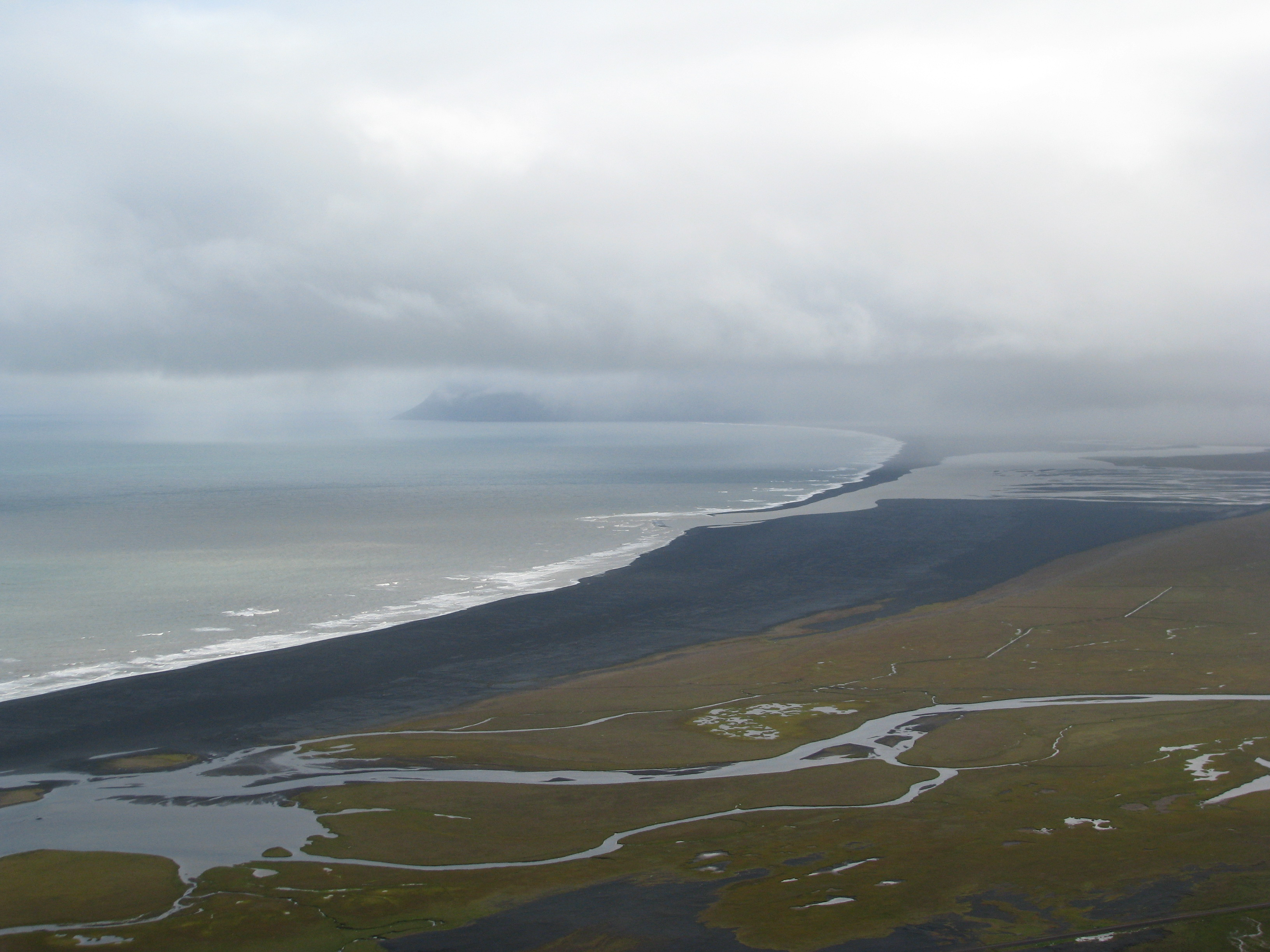
Héraðsflói

Héraðsflói (Icelandic pronunciation: [ˈçɛːraðsˌflouːɪ]) is a bay in eastern Iceland, formed by the outflowing of the Jökulsá á Brú and Lagarfljót rivers. The ~25 km-long beach is the Héraðssandur.
