= Morsárfoss =

Waterfall in Iceland

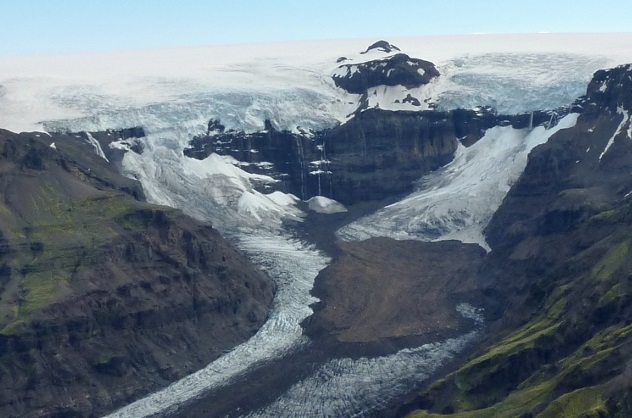
- Morsárfoss and Morsárjökull seen from Kristínartindar, Iceland
- Interactive map of Morsárfoss
- Location: Vatnajökull National Park, Southeast Iceland
- Coordinates: 64°06′44″N 16°53′05″W
- Total height: 240 m (790 ft)
- Number of drops: 1

Morsárfoss (Icelandic pronunciation: [ˈmɔr̥sˌaurˌfɔsː]) is a waterfall in Vatnajökull National Park, Iceland. Measurements showed that one of the several waterfalls in the area is at least 240 metres (790 ft) in total height, making it the tallest waterfall in Iceland. Morsárfoss became visible in 2007 when Morsárjökull, an outlet glacier of Vatnajökull glacier, started melting.

the name is composed of -foss (old language fors i.e. Helsingfors) meaning waterfall, -ár, genetive of á (aqua) meaning river, but the stem syllable is of obscure and uncertain origin with speculations that it mey imply darkness of the river or in some maner a stoney river

== See also ==
- List of waterfalls
- List of waterfalls in Iceland
