= Seljalandsfoss =

Waterfall in Iceland

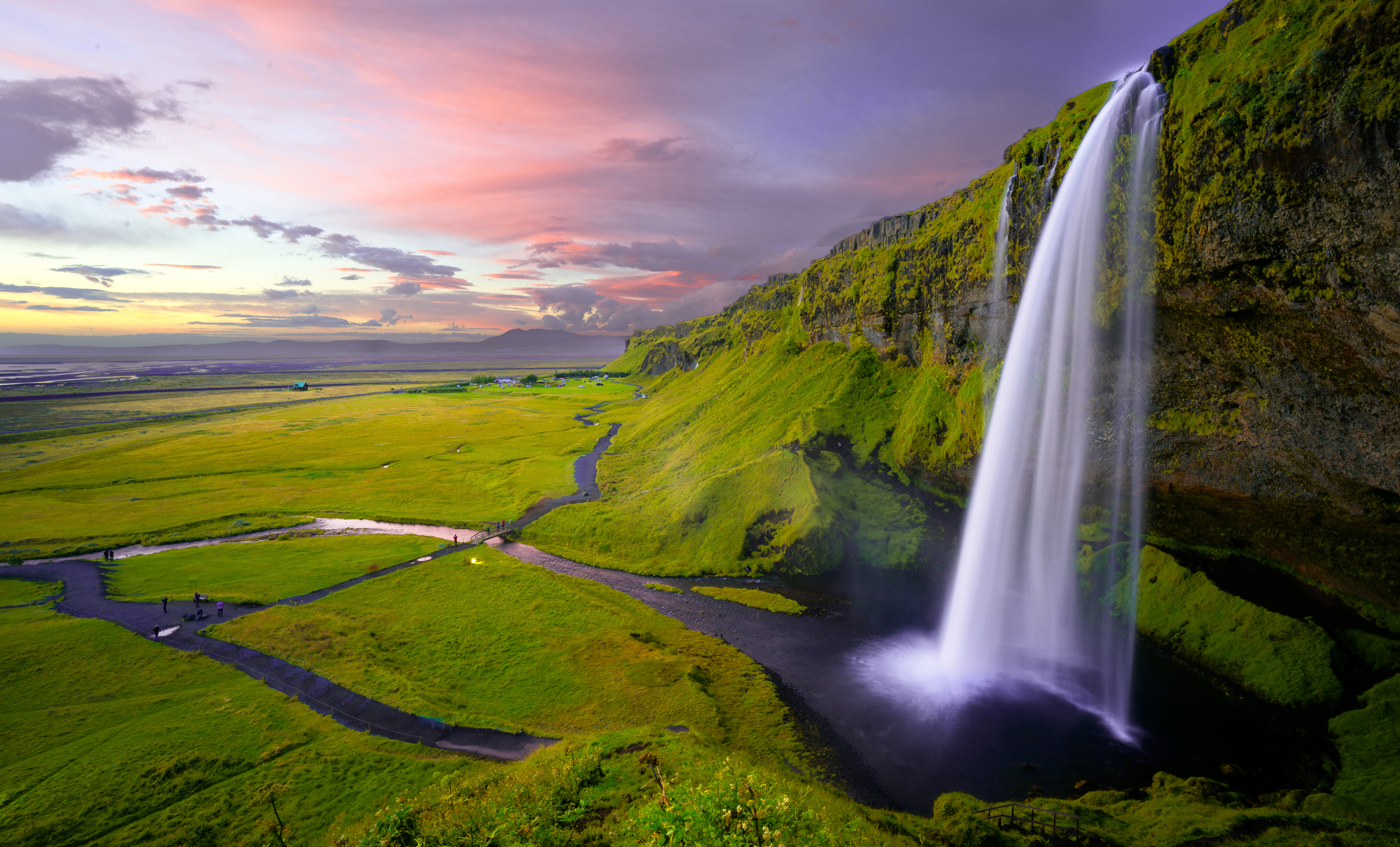
- Seljalandsfoss waterfall

- Location within Iceland
- Location: Southern Region, Iceland
- Coordinates: 63°36′57″N 19°59′34″W
- Total height: 60 m (200 ft)
- Number of drops: 1

Seljalandsfoss (Icelandic pronunciation: [ˈsɛljaˌlan(t)sˌfɔsː]) is a waterfall in Iceland. Seljalandsfoss is located in the South Region in Iceland right by Route 1 and the road that leads to Þórsmörk Road 249. The waterfall drops 60 m (197 ft) and is part of the Seljalands River that has its origin in the volcano glacier Eyjafjallajökull. Visitors can walk behind the falls into a small cave.

== Controversy ==
Plans to build an 8-metre-high (26 ft), 2,000-square-metre (22,000 sq ft) information centre near the waterfall provoked controversy in Iceland in May 2017. Opponents of the plans argued that the building would spoil the view of the waterfall and interrupt the natural look of the area.

== In popular culture ==
Seljalandsfoss was a waypoint during the first leg of The Amazing Race 6.

Seljalandsfoss was featured in the movie CKY2K along with music from Björk Guðmundsdóttir.

A scene from the 1990 movie The Juniper Tree has Björk's character walk behind the waterfall.

The official music video of "I'll Show You" by Justin Bieber features glacial lagoons and rivers in South Iceland, including Seljalandsfoss.

The first episode of season three of Star Trek: Discovery "That Hope Is You, Part 1" featured a brief scene at the waterfall.

== Gallery ==
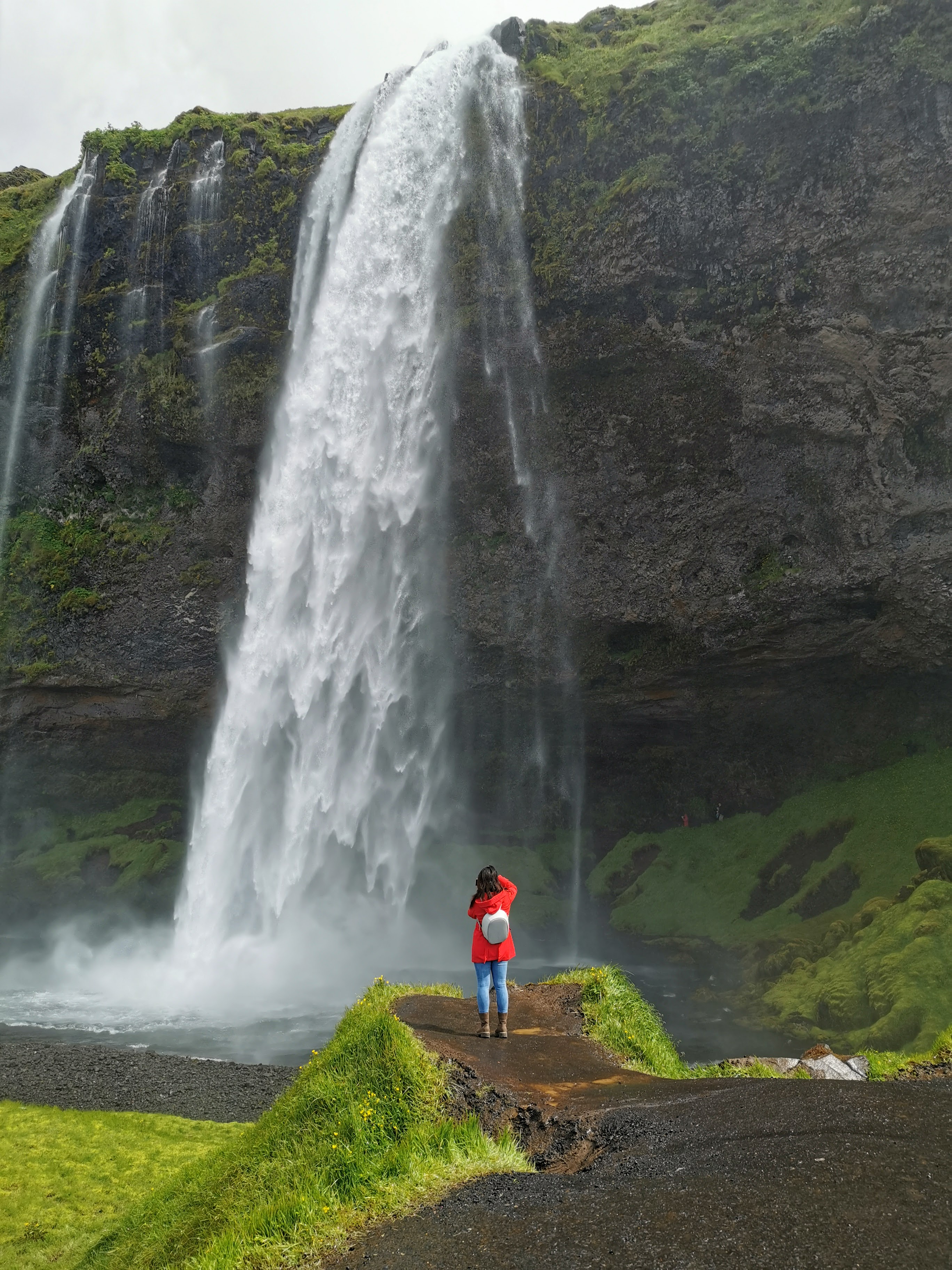
Front Face of the Waterfalls

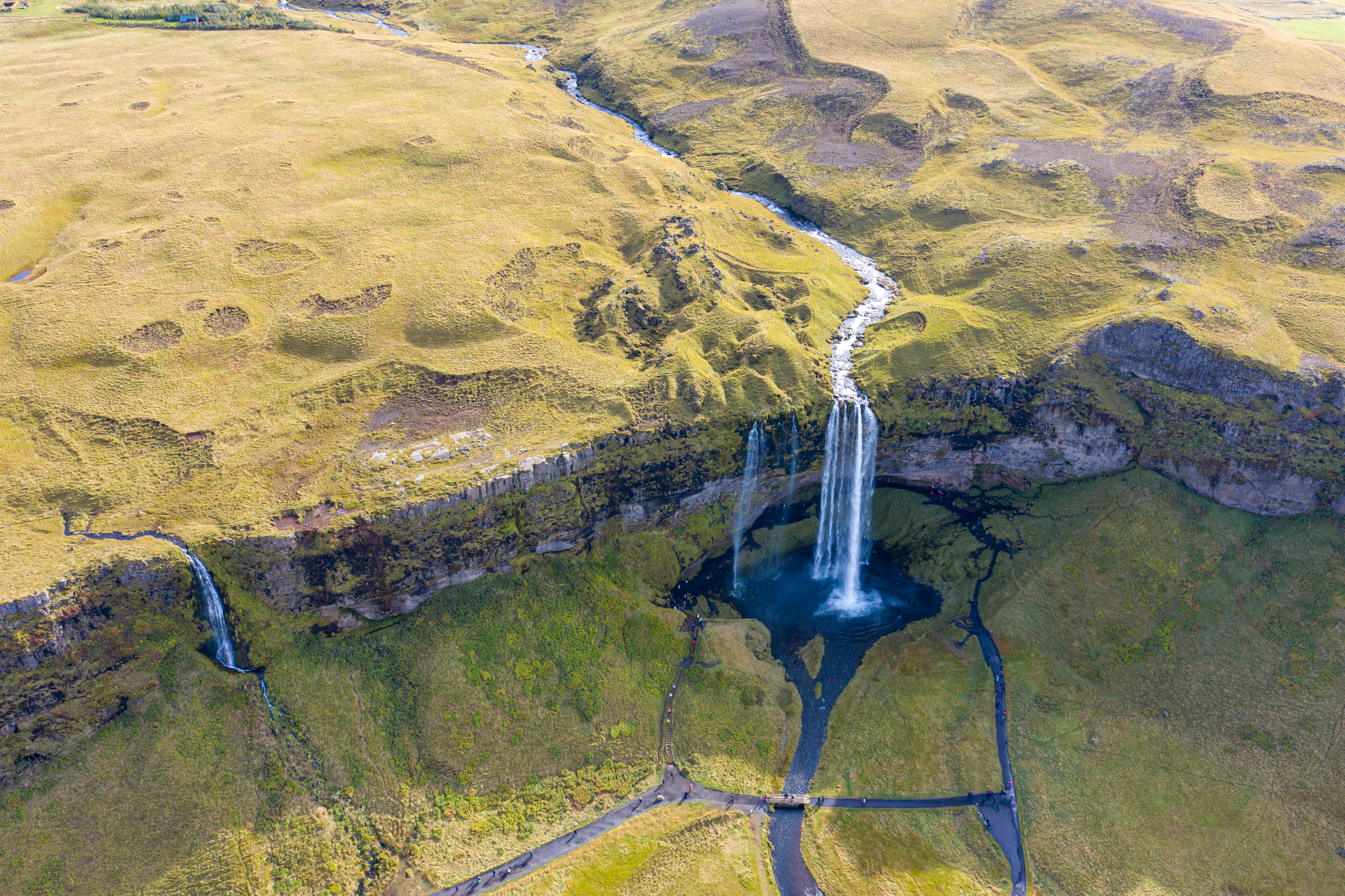
Seljalandsfoss aerial view

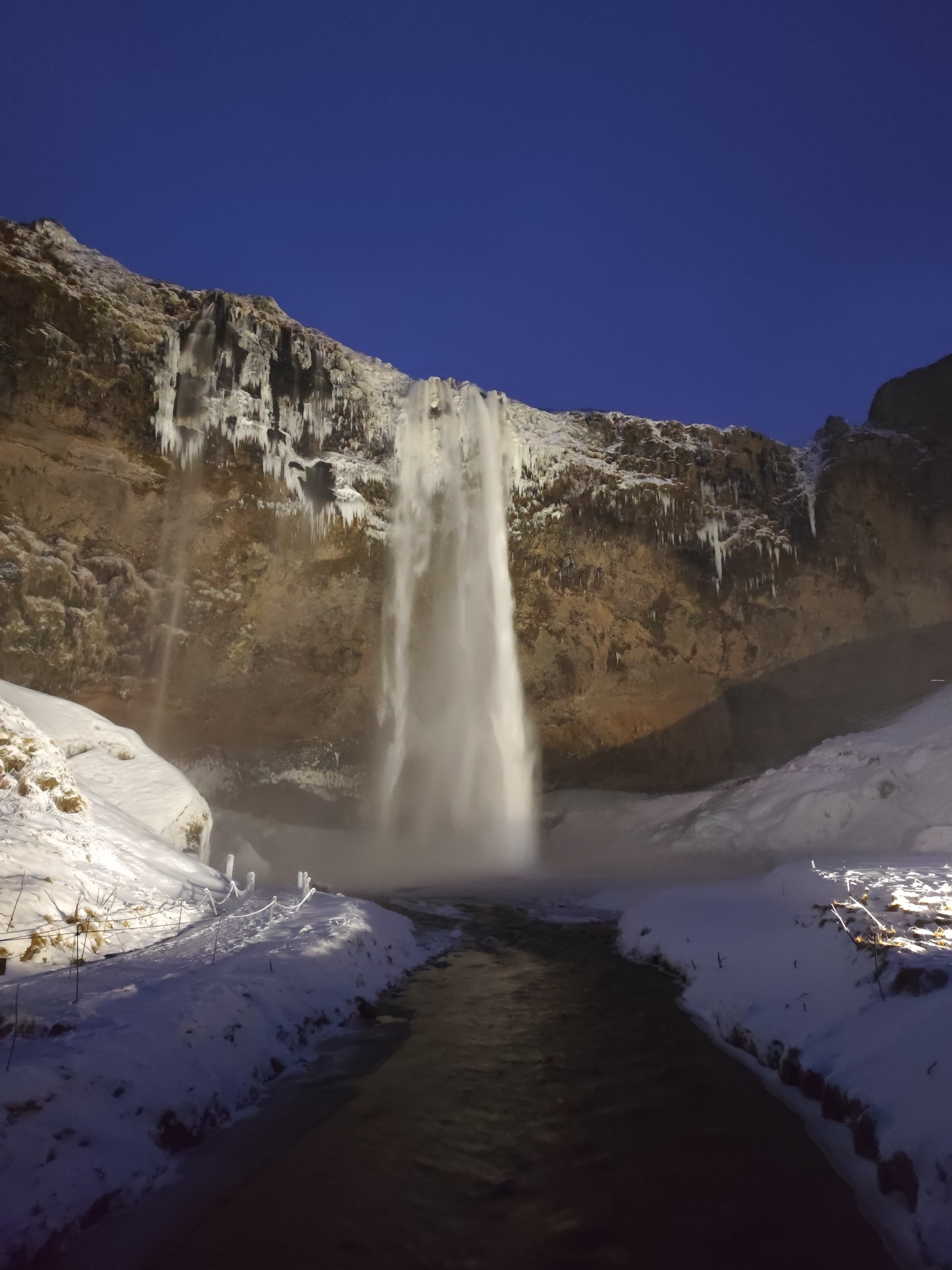
Seljalandsfoss at night

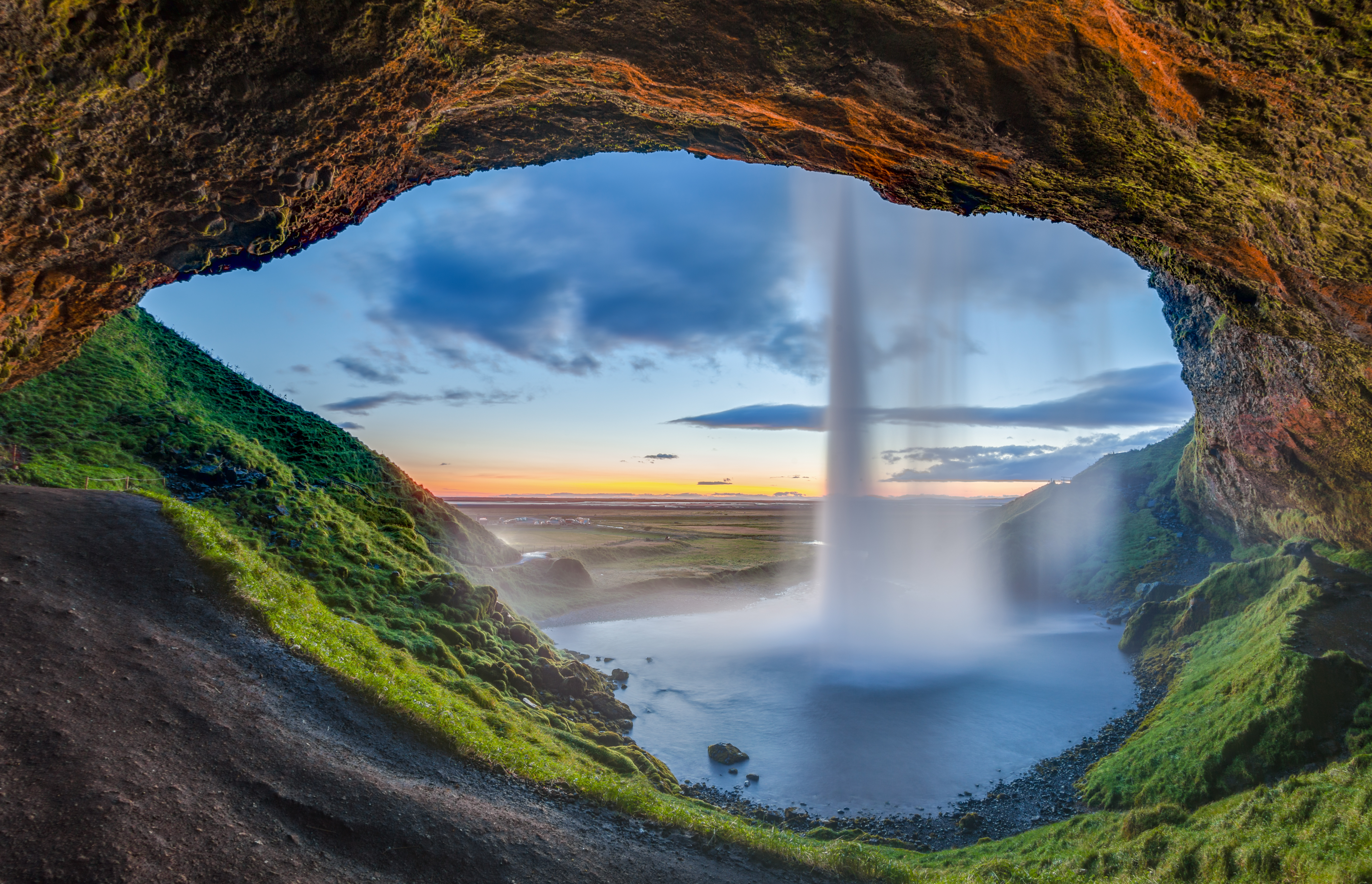
Seljalandsfoss seen from behind

== See also ==
- Waterfalls of Iceland
- List of waterfalls
