= Skaftárhreppur =

- Municipality
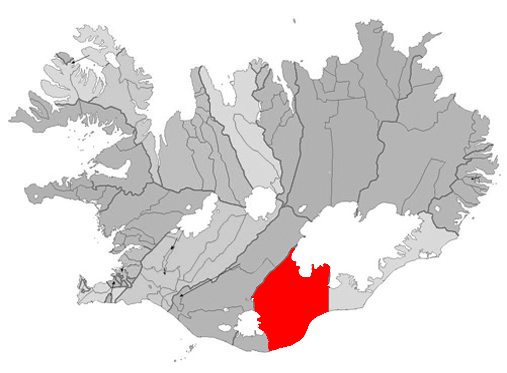
- Location of the municipality

- Location within Iceland
- Coordinates: 63.789°N 18.054°W
- Country: Iceland
- Region: Southern Region
- Constituency: South Constituency

Government
  - Manager: Eygló Kristjánsdóttir

Area
  - Total: 6,946 km^{2} (2,682 sq mi)

Population
  - Total: 452
  - Density: 0.07/km^{2} (0.18/sq mi)
- Postal code(s): 880
- Municipal number: 8509
- Website: klaustur.is

Skaftárhreppur (Icelandic pronunciation: [ˈskaftˌaur̥ˌr̥ɛhpʏr̥]) is a rural municipality in southern Iceland. The largest settlement is Kirkjubæjarklaustur, which is home to the Vatnajökull National Park Visitor Centre. The municipality was formed in 1990 after five smaller districts were merged together.

Notable people from the district include Kristín Larúsdóttir, a tölt riding champion.
