= Kirkjubæjarklaustur =

Kirkjubæjarklaustur Klaustur
- Village
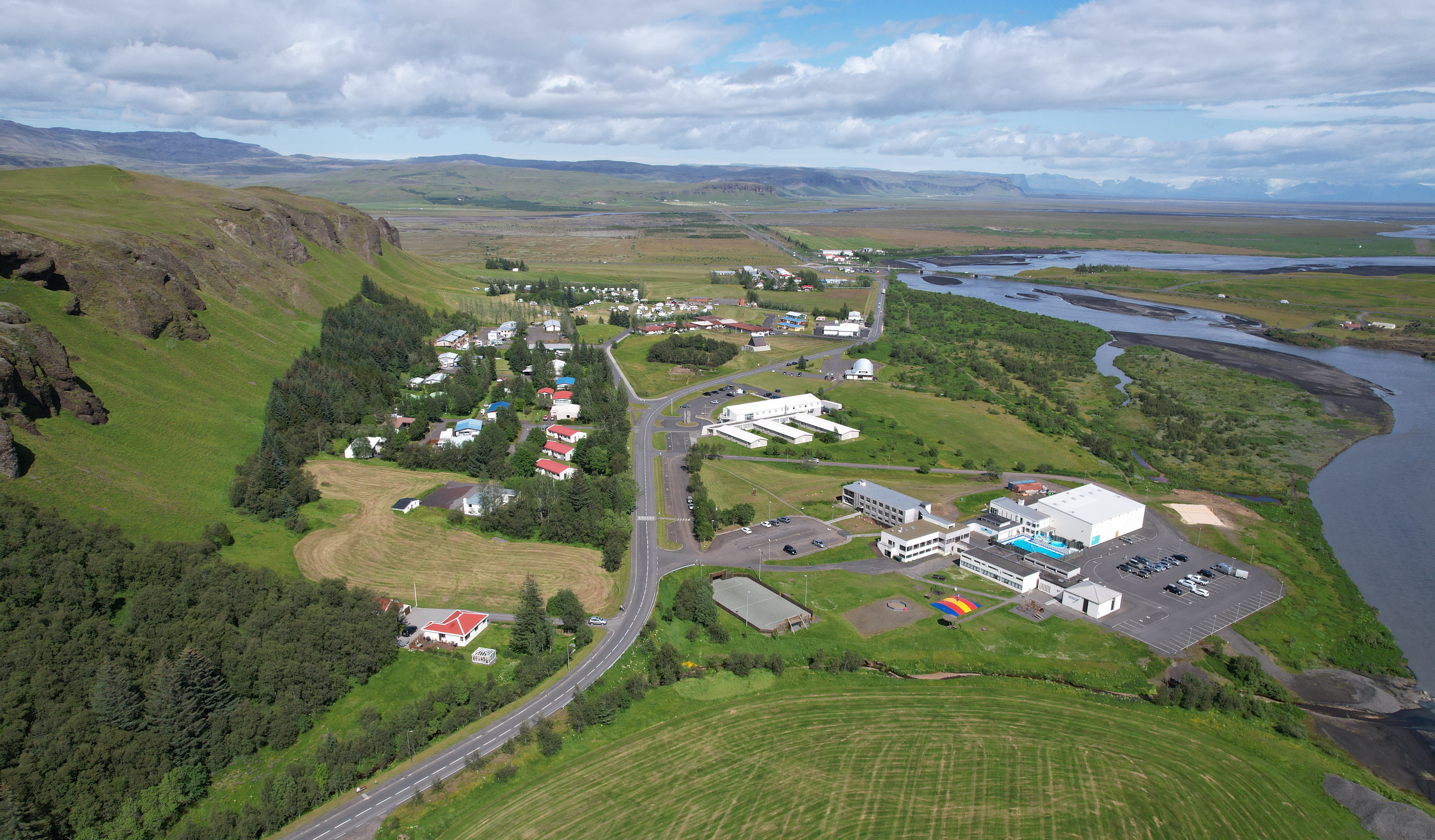
- Kirkjubæjarklaustur

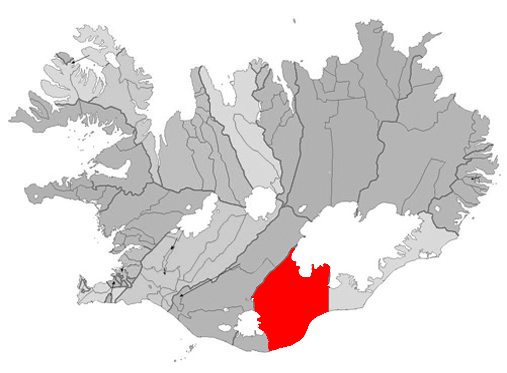
- Location of the Municipality of Skaftárhreppur

- Location in Iceland
- Coordinates: 63°46′N 18°4′W
- Country: Iceland
- Constituency: South Constituency
- Region: Southern Region
- Municipality: Skaftárhreppur

Population (2018)
  - Total: 176
- Time zone: UTC+0 (GMT)
- Website: Official website

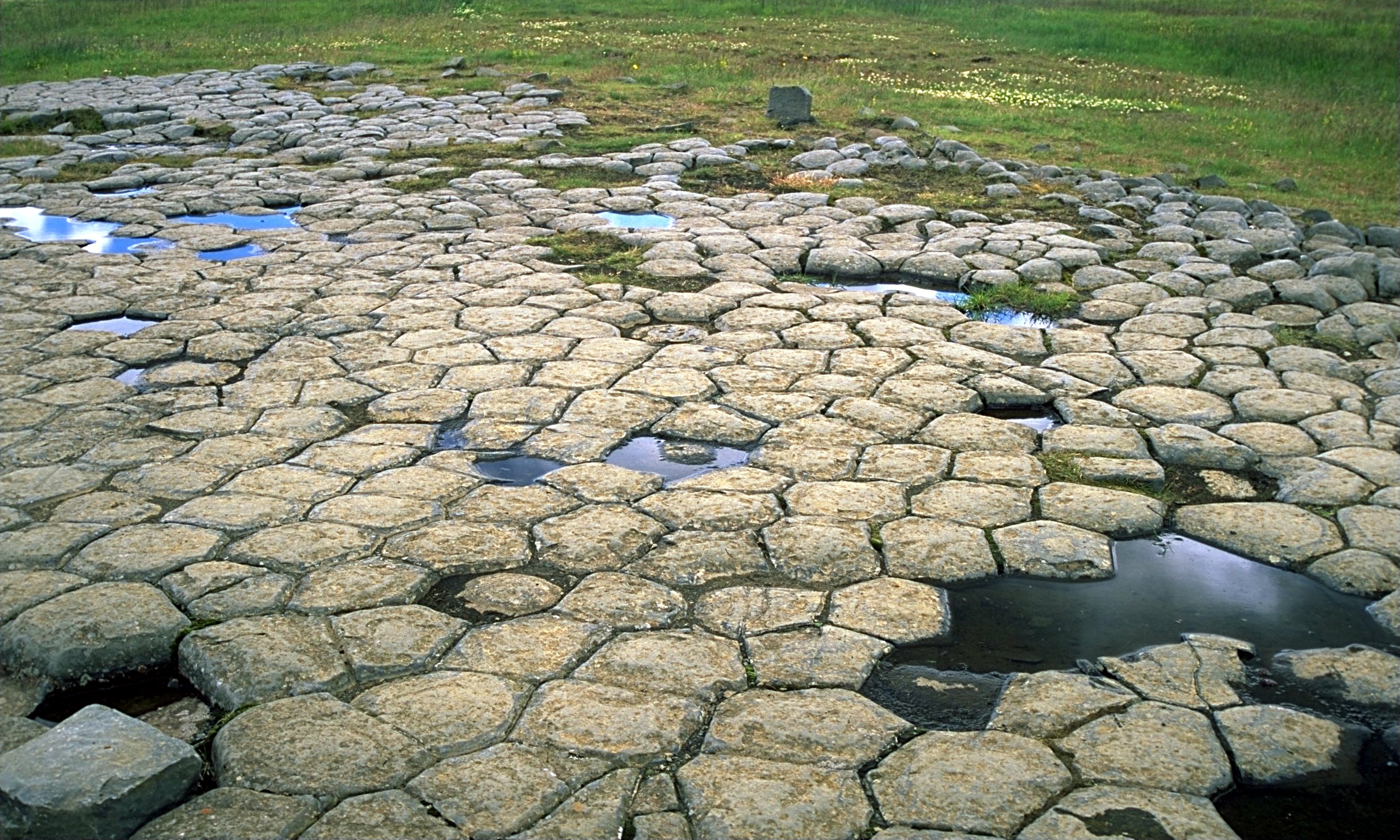
Kirkjubæjarklaustur's basalt Kirkjugólf (Church Floor)

Kirkjubæjarklaustur (Icelandic for "church farm cloister", pronounced [ˈcʰɪr̥cʏˌpaiːjarˌkʰlœystʏr̥]; often referred to locally as just Klaustur) is a village in the south of Iceland on the hringvegur (road no. 1 or Ring Road) between Vík í Mýrdal and Höfn. It is part of the municipality of Skaftárhreppur and has about 500 inhabitants. It is surrounded by hills and plateaus to the north. Kirkjubæjarklaustur is roughly 190 kilometres (120 mi) east of the capital city of Reykjavik.

== Location ==
Kirkjubæjarklaustur is located between Vík and Höfn, and it includes a fuel station, a bank, a post office and a supermarket. Nearby tourist attractions include the Laki craters, the Eldgjá and Skaftafell, all in Vatnajökull National Park. A visitor center for the park opened in 2024 and acts as an information center for Skaftárhreppur. An attraction close to the village is Kirkjugólf [ˈcʰɪr̥cʏˌkoulf] ("Church floor"), a natural pavement of basalt. These are basalt columns in the earth, the visible tops of which have the appearance of a paved church floor. This lava formation has similar origins to the Giant's Causeway in Ireland.

== History ==
Even before the time of the first Norse settlement in Iceland, Irish monks are thought to have lived here. Since 1186, a well known convent of Benedictine nuns, Kirkjubæjar Abbey, was located in Kirkjubæjarklaustur, until the Reformation in 1550. The names of the waterfall Systrafoss ('waterfall of the sisters') and of the lake Systravatn [ˈsɪstraˌvahtn̥] ('water of the sisters') on the highland above the village refer to this abbey. Folk tales illustrate the history with stories about good and sinful nuns. The Systrastapi [ˈsɪstraˌstaːpɪ] ('sisters' rock') is where two of the convent's nuns were buried after being burned at the stake. One of the nuns was accused of selling her soul to the Devil, carrying Communion bread outside the church, and having carnal knowledge with men; the other was charged with speaking blasphemously of the Pope. After the Reformation, the second sister was vindicated, and flowers are said to bloom on her grave, but not that of the first nun. Systravatn also has a legend relating to the convent. According to the English text on the Katla Geopark sign next to the lake, the nuns frequently bathed in the lake, and one day two nuns saw a hand holding a gold comb reach out from the water. When they tried to seize the comb, they were dragged below the water and drowned.

The village became well known in Iceland during the Lakagígar volcano eruptions in 1783. The pastor of the local church and dean of Vestur-Skaftafellssýsla, Jón Steingrímsson (1728–1791), delivered what became known as the "Fire Sermon" (eldmessu [ˈɛltˌmɛsːʏ]) on July 20, 1783. The legend says that this sermon stopped the lava flow, and the village was spared at the last moment. The current church, constructed in 1974, was built in memory of Rev. Jón.

Today, the village is an important service center for the farms in the region as well as for tourists and weekend visitors. Many people from Reykjavík, the country's capital, have weekend huts by a nearby lake.

Some filming for Christopher Nolan's 2014 film Interstellar took place in and around Klaustur. The filmmaker, actors and crew reportedly filled up all of the hotel rooms in Klaustur when shooting was happening.

== Climate ==
Kirkjubæjarklaustur has a subarctic climate according to the koppen-geiger classification with warm, short summers and long, mild winters.

In January Kirkjubæjarklaustur's average temperature is approximately 0.1 °C (32.2 °F). In July the average temperature is 11.6 °C (52.9 °F). The highest temperature ever recorded was 30.2 °C (86.4 °F) on June 22, 1939, whilst the lowest temperature ever recorded was −19.1 °C (−2.4 °F) on February 6, 1969.

Climate data for Kirkjubæjarklaustur, 1981–2010 normals, extremes 1935–2013
Month	Jan	Feb	Mar	Apr	May	Jun	Jul	Aug	Sep	Oct	Nov	Dec	Year
Record high °C (°F)	10.7 (51.3)	13.5 (56.3)	14.0 (57.2)	17.9 (64.2)	21.5 (70.7)	30.2 (86.4)	29.2 (84.6)	24.4 (75.9)	20.1 (68.2)	15.6 (60.1)	12.5 (54.5)	10.0 (50.0)	30.2 (86.4)
Mean daily maximum °C (°F)	2.4 (36.3)	2.6 (36.7)	3.7 (38.7)	6.7 (44.1)	10.6 (51.1)	13.6 (56.5)	15.4 (59.7)	14.7 (58.5)	11.3 (52.3)	7.2 (45.0)	4.1 (39.4)	2.7 (36.9)	7.9 (46.2)
Daily mean °C (°F)	0.1 (32.2)	0.0 (32.0)	0.8 (33.4)	3.3 (37.9)	6.9 (44.4)	9.8 (49.6)	11.6 (52.9)	11.0 (51.8)	8.1 (46.6)	4.6 (40.3)	1.8 (35.2)	0.3 (32.5)	4.9 (40.8)
Mean daily minimum °C (°F)	−2.5 (27.5)	−2.5 (27.5)	−1.8 (28.8)	0.6 (33.1)	3.8 (38.8)	6.9 (44.4)	8.7 (47.7)	8.3 (46.9)	5.6 (42.1)	2.3 (36.1)	−0.6 (30.9)	−2.2 (28.0)	2.2 (36.0)
Record low °C (°F)	−15.8 (3.6)	−19.1 (−2.4)	−15.3 (4.5)	−18.2 (−0.8)	−6.6 (20.1)	−1.0 (30.2)	2.9 (37.2)	0.0 (32.0)	−3.8 (25.2)	−9.8 (14.4)	−13.2 (8.2)	−18.5 (−1.3)	−19.1 (−2.4)
Average precipitation mm (inches)	156.6 (6.17)	140.9 (5.55)	132.8 (5.23)	120.9 (4.76)	104.3 (4.11)	113.4 (4.46)	123.2 (4.85)	165.8 (6.53)	157.7 (6.21)	162.6 (6.40)	144.7 (5.70)	176.8 (6.96)	1,699.7 (66.92)
Average precipitation days (≥ 1.0 mm)	16.8	15.6	15.4	14.1	13.7	14.0	13.8	15.7	15.8	15.9	14.8	16.7	182.0
Average snowy days (≥ 0 cm)	15.8	16.1	13.7	4.6	0.8	0.0	0.0	0.0	0.2	1.6	8.5	14.3	75.6
Average relative humidity (%)	77.5	78.5	76.6	76.9	76.2	79.0	79.1	81.2	78.9	79.1	76.7	77.1	78.1
Average dew point °C (°F)	−3.4 (25.9)	−3.4 (25.9)	−3.0 (26.6)	−0.8 (30.6)	2.8 (37.0)	6.4 (43.5)	8.4 (47.1)	8.2 (46.8)	5.0 (41.0)	1.0 (33.8)	−1.8 (28.8)	−3.0 (26.6)	1.4 (34.5)
Source 1: NOAA (humidity 1961-1990)
Source 2: Iceland Met Office (extremes)

== See also ==
- List of settlements in Iceland
- History of Iceland
- Kirkby, a place name in England with a parallel etymology and meaning
