= Þjórsárdalur =

Valley in Iceland

Coordinates: 64°06′22″N 19°54′17″W

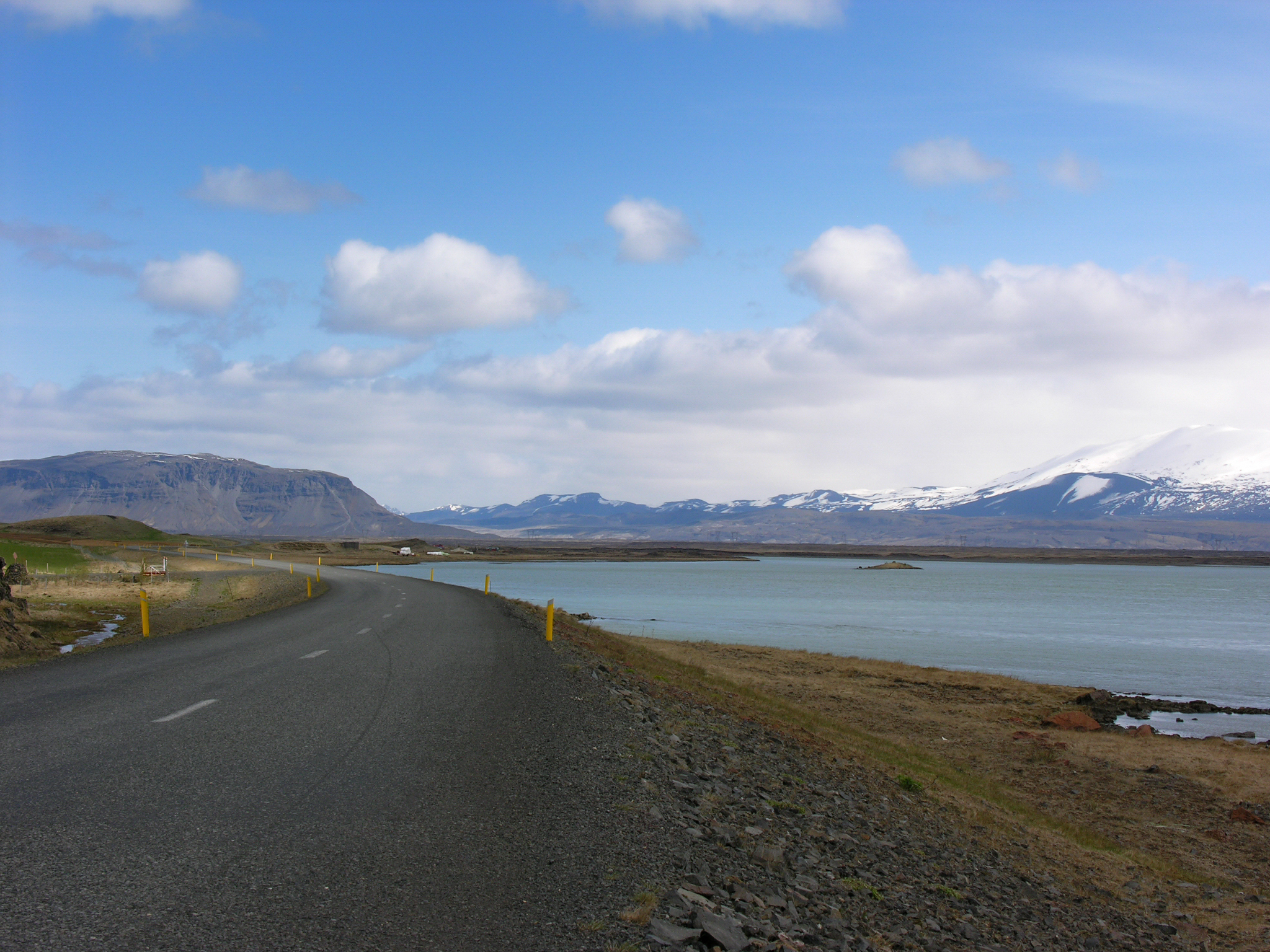
Þjórsárdalur with Búrfell (Þjórsárdal) to the left and Hekla to the right

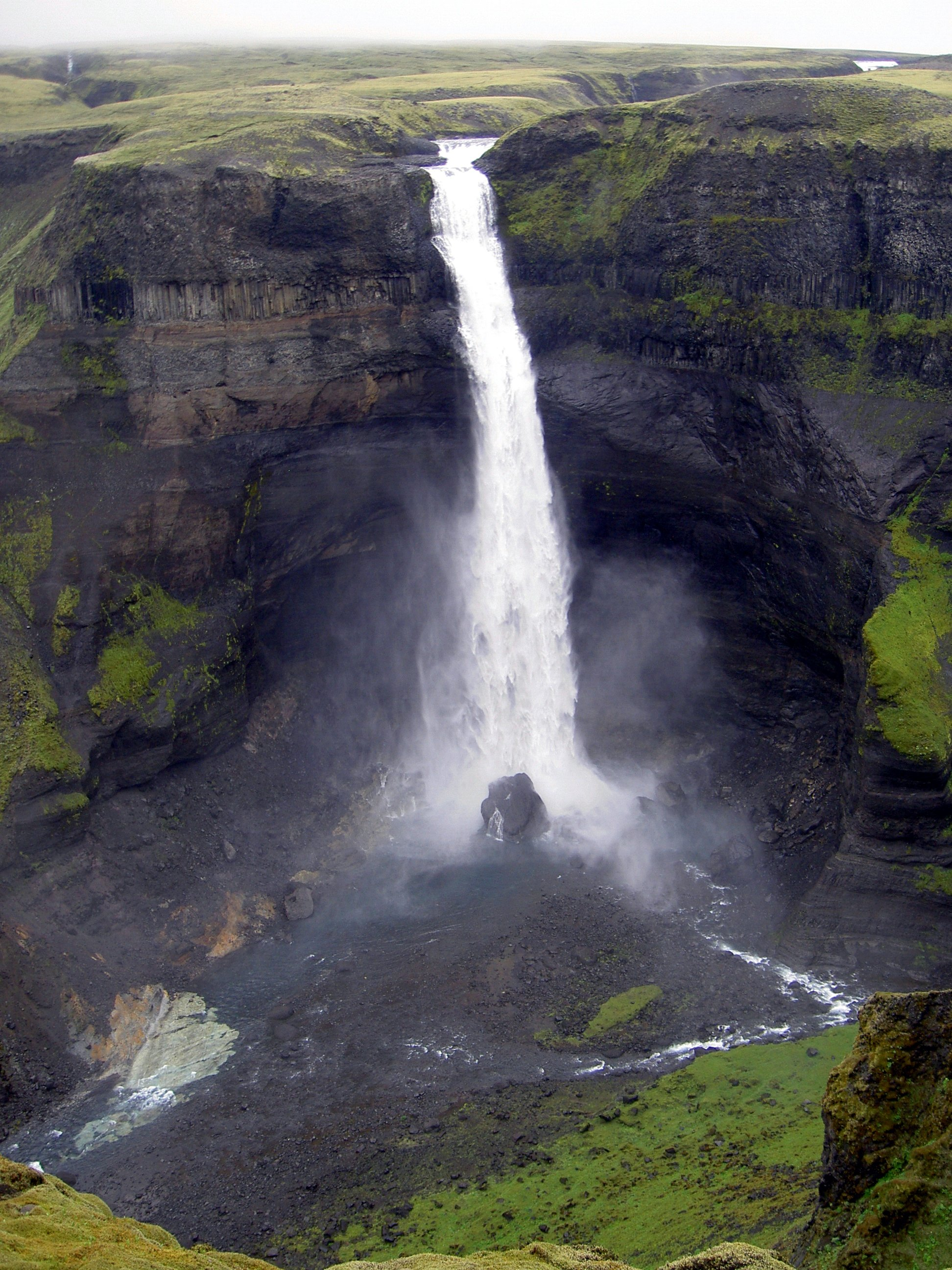
Háifoss waterfall

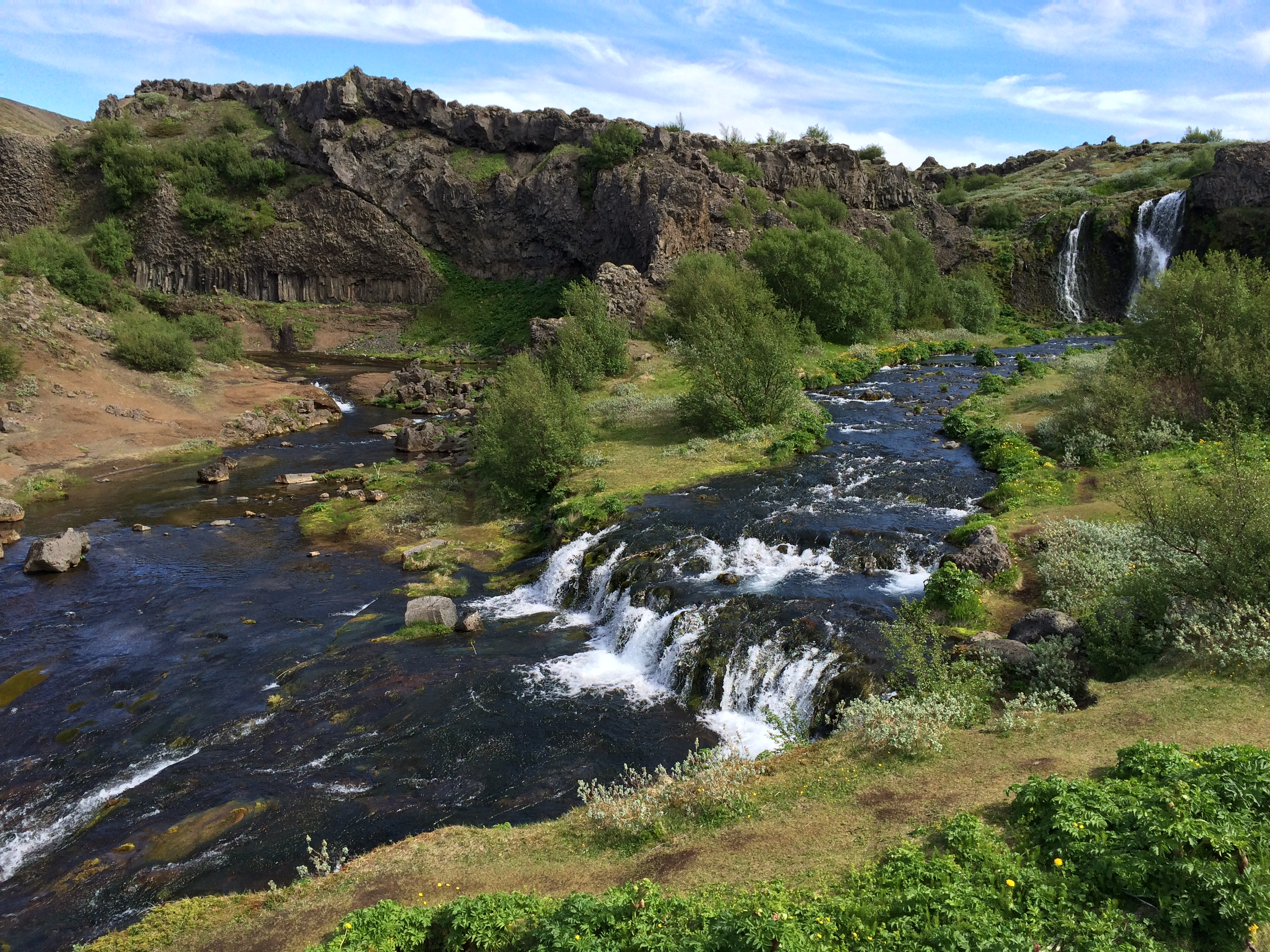
Gjáin

Þjórsárdalur (Icelandic pronunciation: [ˈθjour̥sˌaurˌtaːlʏr̥], lit. 'Þjórsá Valley') is a valley in Árnessýsla county in Iceland that lies between the mountain Búrfell, alongside the river Þjórsá to the east and the mountain Skriðufell to the west. The valley is quite flattened over and pumicey after repeated eruption of the nearby volcano Hekla as well as other volcanoes in the vicinity like the Vatnaöldur volcanic system which produced Iceland's biggest known lavafield Þjórsá Lava (Þjórsárhraun) in prehistoric times or the Grímsnes volcanic system with the crater Kerið. Landmarks in Þjórsárdal include Þjóðveldisbærinn Stöng, Gjáin, Háifoss, and Vegghamrar.

== Geography and Nature ==
Þjórsárdalur valley is divided into two valley floors: Rauðukamba in the eastern part; and Bergólfsstaðaá (towards the river Sandá) in the west.

On the inside of both valleys is the mountain Fossalda, and east of the river Fossá is Stangarfell. The next mountain towards the southwest is Skeljafell; after that, Sámsstaðamúli, and finally Búrfell. The valleys join at the south end. West of Fossöldu are the mountains Flóamannafjöll, then Dímon, Selhöfði, Skriðufell and Ásólfsstaðafjall. Under Hagafjall are the capes Bringa and Gaukshöfði.

== Vegetation ==
In the corner of the valley besides Ásólfsstöðum and Skriðufelli is a large forest. This area of Þjórsárdals is lush with vegetation, as are Búrfell's woods. Yet Landgræðsla Ríkisins (the Soil Conservation Service of Iceland) has continued to conduct extensive soil reclamation on the grounds covered by pumice with among other things lupins and grass species. Western Fossár has pumice as well that is cultivated, mostly within the enclosure of highland pasture called Gnúpverjaafréttur, but there are different grass species, including a lot of sea lyme grass. Landsvirkjun (Iceland's national electricity company) has cultivated the area around Búrfellsvirkjun and Þjóðveldisbærinn, and one can find there, among other things, a golf course.

In Gjáin and Kjóaflöt there is an abundance of vegetation, It is especially scenic in Gjáin, since the Rauðá river winds through the cliff the ravine. There is a lot of angelica around the spring, as well as many species of moss and grass.

== Places of interest ==
The farm of Þjóðveldisbærinn Stöng, which was covered by the ashes of mount Hekla's 1104 eruption, was excavated in 1939.

It was rebuilt at about 10 km (6.2 mi) to the south of its former place near Búrfellsvirkjun hydroelectric power station as the farm museum Þjóðveldisbærinn Stöng so that now one can see how fireplaces and other house fixtures looked during the Saga Age (ca 930-1030).

A footbridge goes across the river Rauðá right at the bottom of the original place of Stöng. From Stöng there is a popular walk on foot to Gjáin.

Þjórsárdals's hot spring is west of the waterfall, east near Rauðukambar. There is a hot spring bath, and an abundance of hot- and cold water that is freely flowing into the hot spring. Inside the valley is Háifoss, one of the highest waterfalls of Iceland. Skeiða- og Gnúpverjahreppur has provided a viewing platform west of Stangarfelli which is situated on the way from Hólaskógur.

Near the farm museum is Hjálparfoss, which is a split waterfall in a dell that joins together in Búrfell.

Vegghamrar are rocky cliffs midway between Hallslaut and Rauðukamba. Under them lies the ancient Sprengisandsleið, and the mountain men Gnúpverja ride through here on the way to the mountains.

== Tourism development ==
Construction is underway at Rauðukambar in the eastern part of the valley. The project comprises a hotel built into the rock formation, a bathing lagoon, a visitor centre, accommodation, and parking facilities. Cabins and lodges are due to open in 2027, with the rest of the destination following as the development progresses.
