= Fossafélagið Títan =

Icelandic company

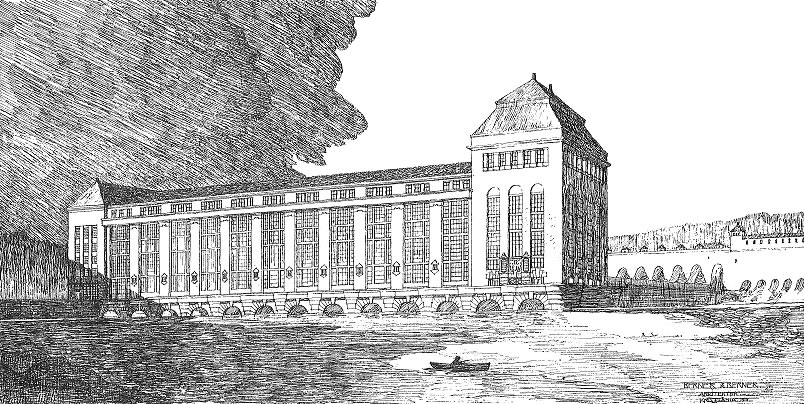
- 1918 drawing by Gotfred Sætersmoen showing the proposed Urriðafoss power plant on the Þjórsá river
- Industry: Power generation
- Founded: 1914; 112 years ago in Iceland
- Defunct: 1951
- Fate: Dissolved

Fossafélagið Títan (Titan Waterfall Company) was an Icelandic company founded in 1914 to develop hydroelectric power plants. From 1914 to 1919 the company acquired shares of water rights and contracts with mine owners in Iceland. In 1927 the company received permission to build a 160,000 horsepower (120,000 kW) power station at Urriðafoss but was unable to raise capital for construction. The company became dormant and was wound up in 1951.

== Origins ==
Frímann B. Arngrímsson came to Iceland in 1894 with proposals to mobilize water power to illuminate streets and buildings, but did not obtain backing. He met the poet and entrepreneur Einar Benediktsson, who encouraged him. Einar became fascinated by the potential of hydroelectric power, and his poetry discusses the power of waterfalls. In 1906 he began to engage in power generation enterprises, joining the boards of two companies, Skjálfanda and Gigant. These were formed to build and operate hydroelectric power plants, particularly the northern waterfalls of the Skjálfandafljót and Jökulsá á Fjöllum rivers.

In the fall of 1907 Einar Benediktsson travelled overseas to try to attract foreign capital to Iceland. He saw Norway as a model, a poor country that had used foreign investment to develop heavy industry. Over the next years Einar worked hard to establish overseas companies to exploit Icelandic waterfalls, and to buy or lease water rights in many of Iceland's major streams. His main partners were the brothers Sturla and Friðrik Sturlubræður, two of the wealthiest merchants in Reykjavík. Fund raising began, but there was opposition from people who objected to foreign involvement. Parliament passed a new law on waterfalls in 1907 that imposed further restrictions.

== Foundation ==
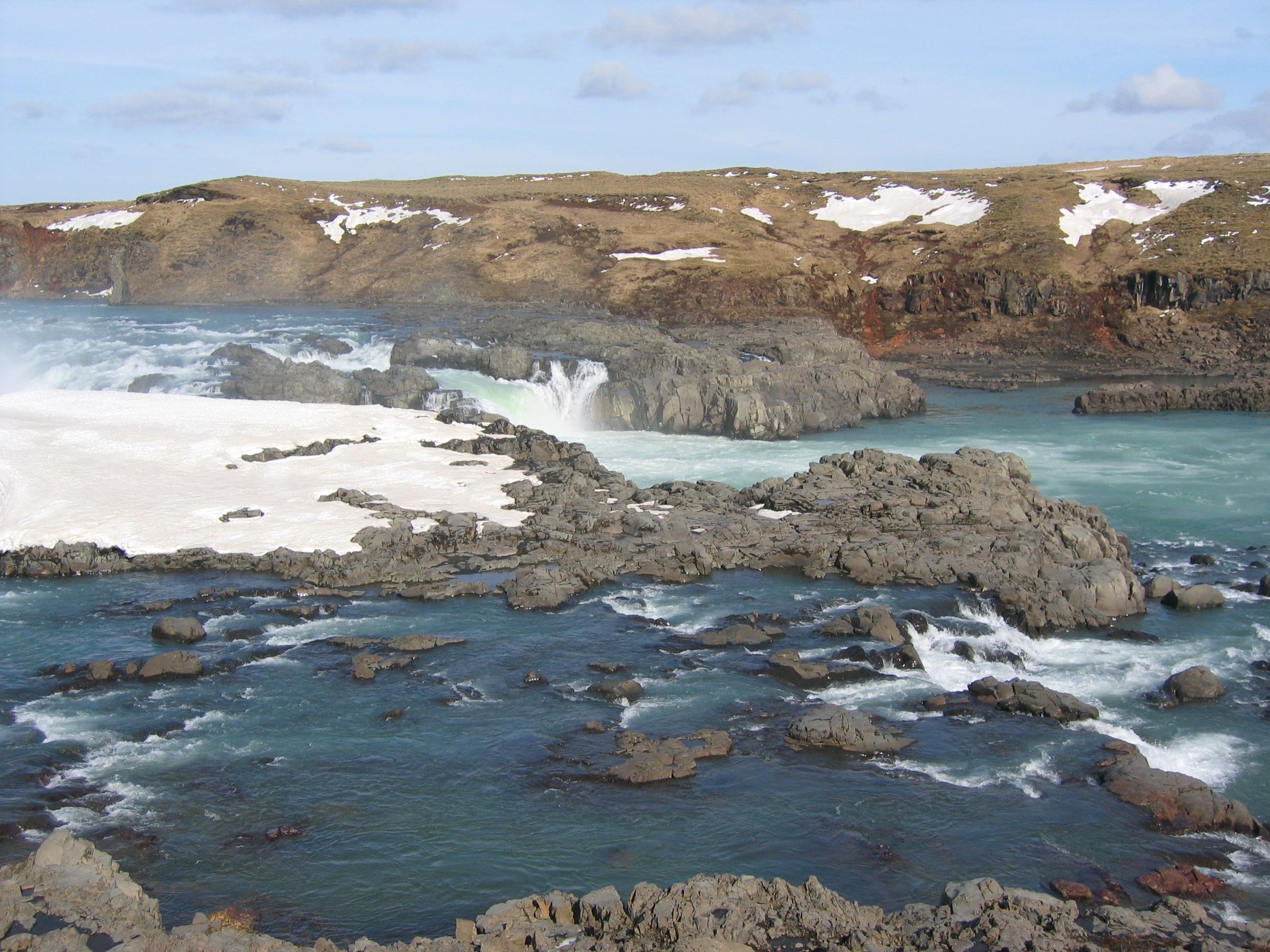
Urriðafoss waterfall on the Þjórsjá

In 1914 Einar Benediktsson was one of the founders of Fossafélagið Títan and three sister companies Sirius, Orion and Taurus, established to harness the power of the Þjórsá waterfalls. Titan was the largest of the companies, and later absorbed the others. The Titan company was established in February 1914 with a nominal capital of ISK 12 million, double the budget of the state of Iceland.

The Norwegians associated with the company included highly regarded lawyers, engineers and businessmen in Kristiania (now Oslo). They were led by Oluf Aall, a Supreme Court Attorney who was chairman of the Titan company for many years. Oluf Aall was ten years younger than Einar Benediktsson, and specialized in legal counseling for Norwegian companies in foreign enterprises. He was chairman of many companies, was wealthy in his own right and was active in Norwegian politics. Icelanders who were involved in Titan from the first included the Sturlubræður brothers and the lawyer Eggert Claessen.

== Operations ==
The company obtained share capital, purchased water rights and carried out extensive surveys of Þjórsá and its surroundings. Norwegian engineers undertook the surveys led by Gotfred Sætersmoen, who was also a member of the board of directors. The studies of the Þjórsá were undertaken in 1915–17. In 1918 the company published the book Vandkraften i Thjorsá elv, Island which gave the results of the research and described the company's plans. The Búrfell Power Plant was by far the largest of the planned power plants, but the Urriðafoss power plant was to be the first. Parliament had set up a water committee to draft a future energy policy, and the management of Fossafélagið Títan hoped this committee would support their plans. On 20 March 1919 Titan applied for a concession to use all the power of the Þjórsá river.

The committee submitted its proposals in 1919. It was thought to be mostly based on Titan's application, and indicated that the government was in favor of development of the power plants. Despite this, changes in the needs of heavy industry and the crisis that followed World War I (1914–18) had the effect of considerably reducing the influence of Titan. The company continued planning, and Einer visited America to try to obtain funding, but did not succeed. However, after the railway company gave its backing to the Þjórsár power plant there was renewed support for Titan, and by a law of 31 May 1927 the company was granted permission to harness Urriðafoss on the Þjórsá.

The proposed power plant was to generate up to 160,000 horsepower (120,000 kW). It was assumed that the river would deliver about 500 cubic metres per second (18,000 cu ft/s) rather than the 360 cubic metres per second (13,000 cu ft/s) that is delivered today. Due to shortage of funds none of the power plants were built, and the company became dormant. It was officially wound up in 1951.

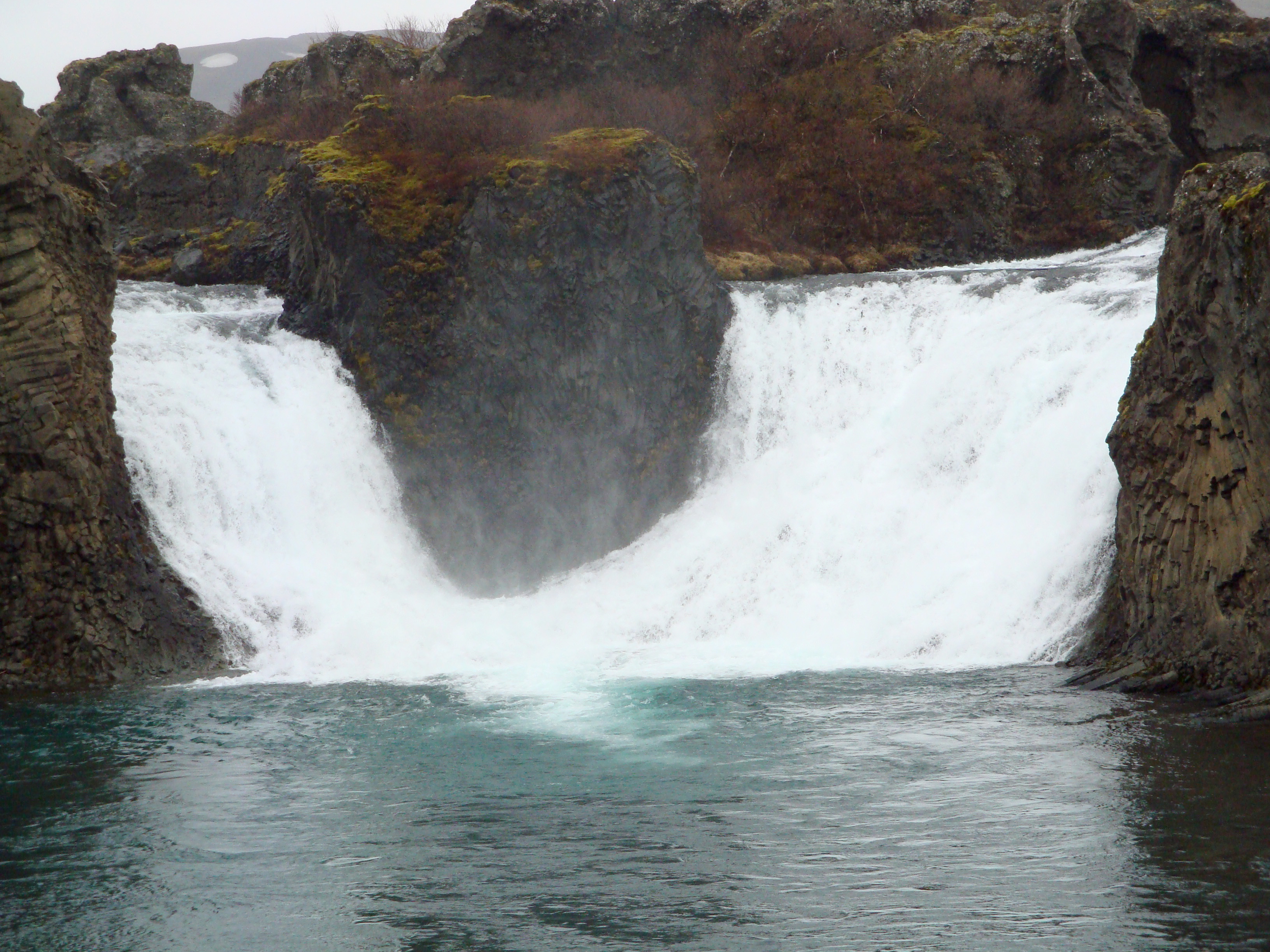
Hjálparfoss, a waterfall in south Iceland off the Fossá river

== Water rights ==
In 1914 Titan obtained rights to use the Þjófafoss, Tröllkonufoss and Gljúfurleitarfoss falls along the Þjórsá river. The company continued to purchase water rights from other southern municipalities, including a stake in Skeiðahreppur on the Háfoss and Hjálparfoss on the Fossá for 3,000 krónur. Einar Benediktsson purchased water rights on the Landmannaafrétti in 1916, which he assigned to the company in 1917, and also in 1916 bought water rights in the Ásahreppur, Holtahreppur and Landmannahreppi municipalities which he assigned to the company in 1918.

In 1918 the government notified all the municipal officials that the water rights were public property, and that the water committee considered that contracts to sell these rights were invalid. The districts had been granted the right to use the water, but did not own the water and therefore could not sell the rights. However, Fossafélagið Títan retained the rights until 1952, when the rights in the Þjórsá, Tungnaá, Köldukvísl, Þórisvatn and other rivers were sold to the Icelandic state for 600,000 Norwegian kroner and 200,000 Icelandic kroner.

== Sources ==
- Eyjólfsson, Pálma (22 August 1998), "Draumurinn um eimreið austur í sveitir", Morgunblaðið (in Icelandic)
- Friðriksson, Guðjón (17 December 1999), "Raunhæf áform eða loftsýn? Einar Benediktsson og Titanfélagið", Vísbending (in Icelandic), 17
- HNIT (April 2003), Urriðafossvirkjun í Þjórsá allt að 150 MW og breyting á Búrfellslínu 2 (PDF) (Environmental Impact Assessment Report) (in Icelandic), Landsvirkjun, archived from the original (PDF) on 2017-10-24
- HÓ (7 January 1989), "Hlutabréf í fossafélaginu Titan á uppboði í Noregi", Morgunblaðið (in Icelandic)
- Kjeld, Alexandra; Bjarnadóttir, Helga J.; Árnason, Ólafur; Höskuldsson, Páll (2 July 2015), Hvammsvirkjun, 93 MWe (PDF) (Review of environmental impact assessment) (in Icelandic)
- rsj (2 April 2002), "Á Landsvirkjun að greiða auðlindagjald?", Morgunblaðið (in Icelandic)
