= Búrfell (Þjórsárdal) =

Mountain in Iceland

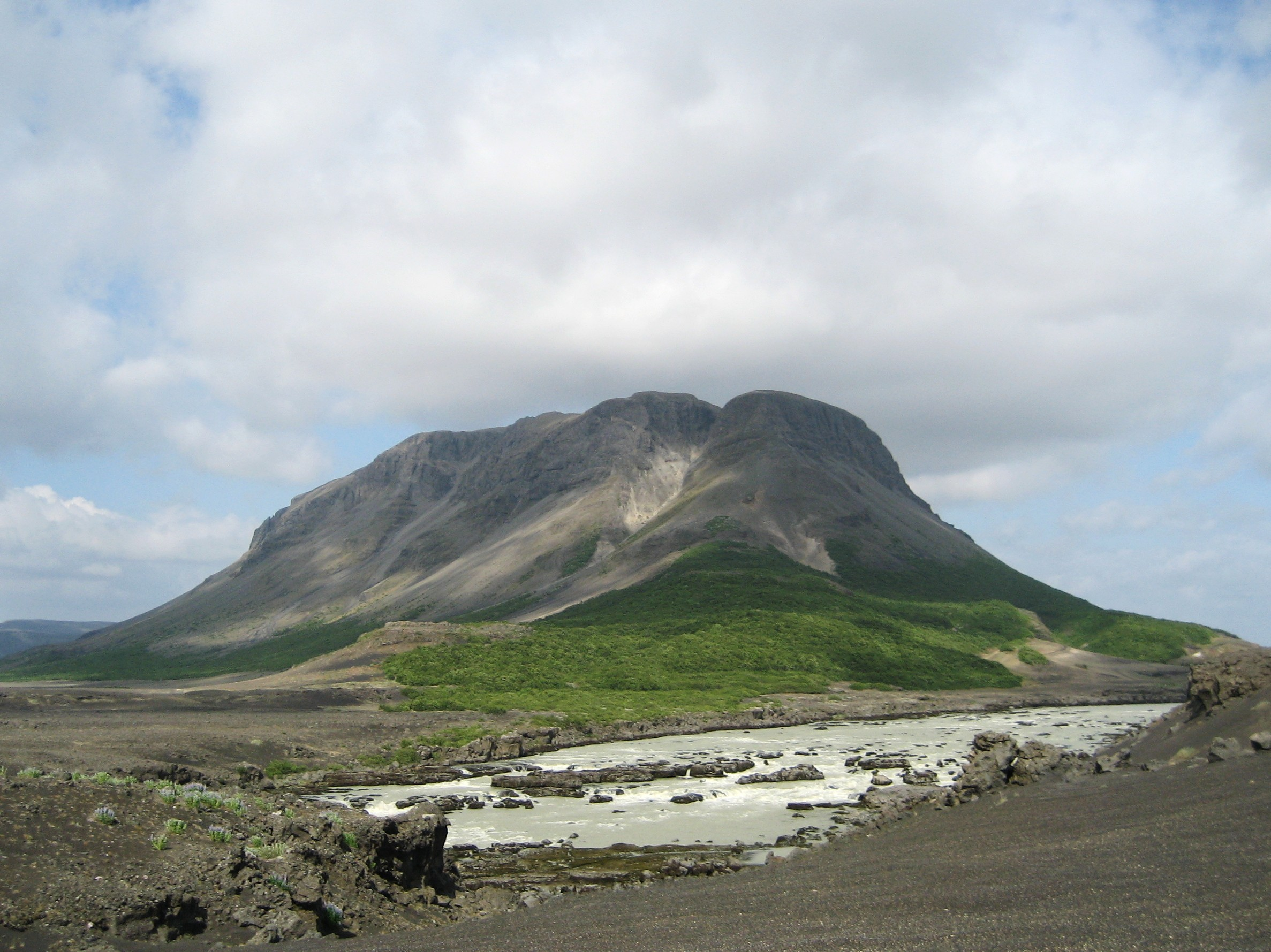
- Búrfell as seen from the south, with the Þjórsá in the foreground

Highest point
- Elevation: 669 m (2,195 ft)
- Coordinates: 64°04′47″N 19°49′04″W

Geography
- Location: Iceland

Geology
- Mountain type: Tuya

Climbing
- Easiest route: Hike

Búrfell (Icelandic pronunciation: [ˈpurˌfɛtl̥]) is a 669 m (2,195 ft) basalt tuya located in Iceland. It is situated in the south of the country along the western boundary of the Þjórsárdalur valley.

== Name ==
There are many different mountains in Iceland by the name of Búrfell.

The Icelandic word búr means cage or pantry in English.

== Búrfellsvirkjun ==
In 1918 the power company Fossafélagið Títan published plans that included a large hydroelectric plant on the mountain. However, due to lack of funding this came to nothing at the time. Today Búrfellsvirkjun, at the foot of the mountain as well as in the mountain itself, is one of the biggest hydroelectric power stations of Iceland. It started working in 1972 after being erected mainly to produce energy for the aluminium factory (Alcan) in Straumsvík in the vicinity of Reykjavík. It is producing at the moment 270 MW.

A lot of the tubes as well as the main power station are lying in tunnels within the mountain.

The Viking farm museum of Þjóðveldisbær is also situated at the foot of this mountain.

== See also ==
- Geology of Iceland
- Volcanism of Iceland
