= Hellnahellir =

Artificial cave in Iceland

Coordinates: 63°50′00″N 20°24′00″W

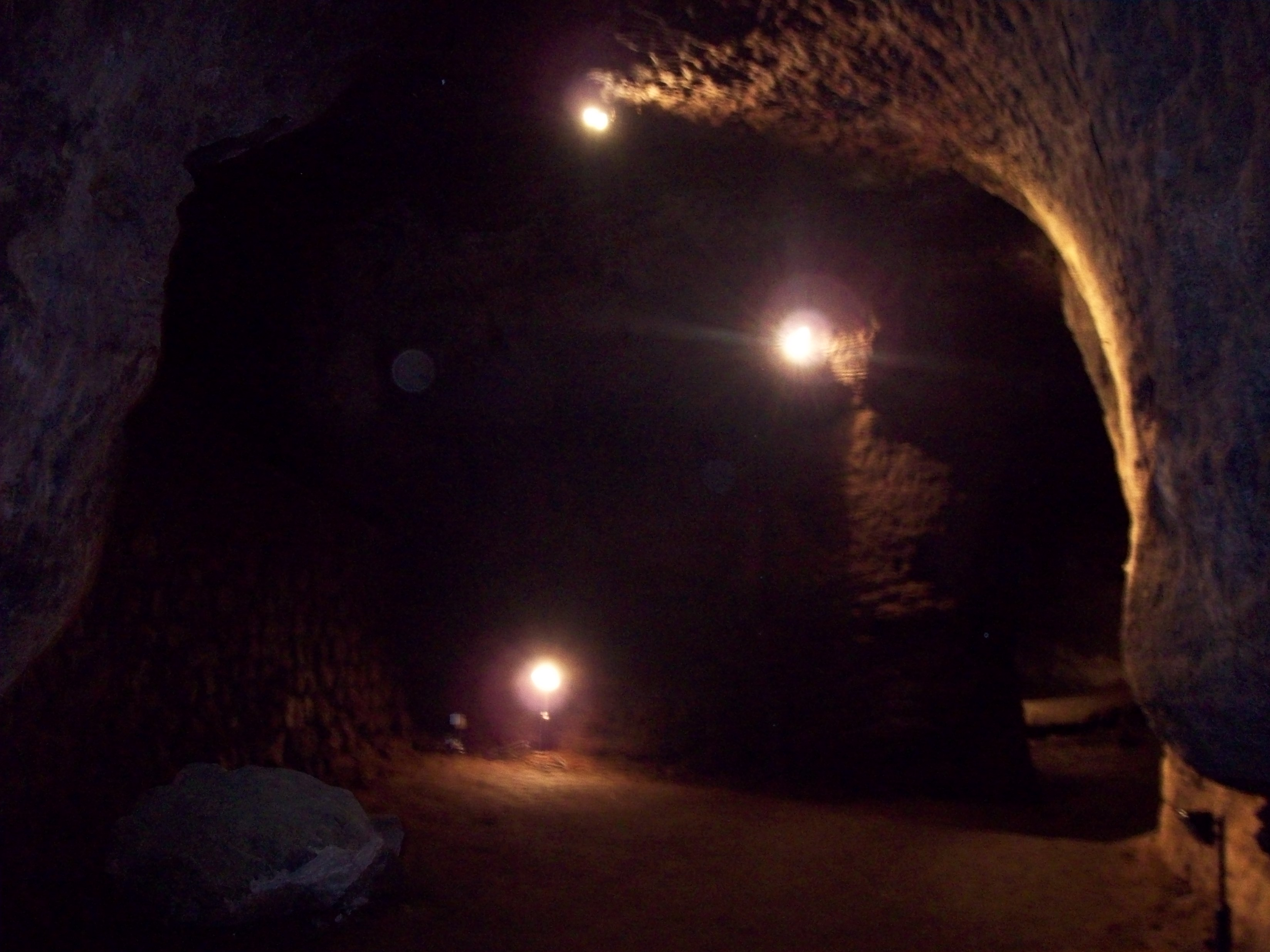
Hellnahellir

Hellnahellir (Icelandic pronunciation: [ˈhɛtlnaˌhɛtlɪr̥]) is the largest man-made or artificial cave in Iceland. It is located in Landsveit, South Iceland. The cave is almost 50 metres (160 ft) long and the walls are covered with engravings. Its age is unknown but it is most probably from 12th or 13th century.

== Hellnahellir ==
Hellnahellir is Iceland's biggest man made cave, approximately 50 meters long. It has two exits, one at each end, and five chimneys built up from the ceiling whose purpose is likely to have been to provide daylight and perhaps to allow smoke from fireplaces to escape from the cave. The cave is built into the mountain Skarðsfjall and lies far enough beneath the surface for it to be free of frost in the winter. In fact the temperature in the cave is about the same the whole year round.

The name Hellnahellir roughly translates into The Cave at Caves – hellir meaning cave and Hellar being both the name of the farm where Hellnahellir is located and also plural for the word cave.

== Origins ==
It will probably never be known for certain how old Hellnahellir really is. Some believe that the cave, or at least some parts of it, was dug out and lived in by Papar, Irish monks who dwelled in Iceland shortly before the Vikings settled in, around the year 900. If this is really the case it makes the cave just about 1,000 years old. Cross marks on the walls and a somewhat large niche, dug into the wall in one place and believed to be the something of an altar, are among the things that support this theory.

If the Irish monks were not responsible for building Hellnahellir it must instead have been built by the farmers living in the area sometime between the years 900 and 1332 because in documents from the latter year the name of the farm, Hellar (Caves), turns up. Since the name of the farm so obviously derives from the existence of caves on the premises it shows that there must have been at least more than one cave there at the time, and what is more, impressive enough to give the farm its name. These facts therefore make Hellnahellir at least 700 years old.

Hellnahellir's original purpose is a bit dependent on the time when it was built but the later it happened we can suppose it becomes less likely to have been inhabited by people. On there are questions about why it has all those chimneys in the ceiling if its sole purpose was to house farm animals, hay or food which would not have needed that much daylight and certainly no smoke-spewing fireplaces.

No archaeological remains have been found in the cave which can support theories about its origin in one way or another. It is however quite clear that Hellnahellir is made by man, dug out of sandstone with the primitive tools of the time when it was made.

== The opening of Hellnahellir ==
The front half of Hellnahellir, the area closest to the barn was used for a long time to store hay in the winter. The other half was at the same time full of loose sand, so much of it that there was only about enough space for a person to crawl between the sand and the ceiling – if in fact anyone had the unlikely urge or the nerve to be crawling about in such a confined and dark place. The sand was finally removed from this end of the cave in the years around 1950, leaving the cave in about the same state it is now.

It is not clear when all this sand entered the cave but landslides coming from the mountain above are however the reason it came to be there. Since big earthquakes have frequently shaken this area through the years, it being both in the neighbourhood of the famous volcano Hekla and also in a part of Iceland which is subject to large earthquakes several times each century, there are ample opportunities for this to have happened.

Since the grassy green mountainside above the cave does not bear any signs of landslides nowadays, it seems clear that the sand must have entered the cave some centuries ago. In Icelandic historical references regarding farmland in Iceland, written in 1702–1714, it says that landslides spoilt fields at the Hellar farm which perhaps refers to the ones that fell into the cave. The descriptions are not accurate enough though for anything but speculations and it could just as well refer to other landslides, elsewhere on the mountain.

Although those landslides must have been a great curse to whoever lived at this farm at the time, they may have been something of a blessing in disguise for Hellnahellir. This is because the landslides have put a several-metres-thick layer of earth on top of the cave essentially putting it farther into the ground than it originally was. The layer of earth contributes to a better preservation of the cave as a form of insulation that makes the temperature inside it more even and the cave less likely to be subject to frost and water damages.

== The Singing-Cave ==
Cow-farming was discontinued at Hellar farm in 1982 and since then Hellnahellir has not been used to store hay in it. Its occupation nowadays is mostly to be viewed by those travellers interested in taking a look at it and to house a few gatherings that have been held there in recent years. The acoustics in Hellnahellir are quite good so concerts have been held there on several occasions and in the year 2000 the bishop of Iceland even held mass in the cave.

Those happenings have made this cave known to some people as The Singing-Cave rather than by its actual name Hellnahellir.

== The calf that got lost in Hellnahellir ==
Hellnahellir has the old legend that a small calf stumbled into the cave and got lost. To look for the poor little calf a workman was sent in after it who wandered around in the cave in the darkness for some time without any success in finding the calf. When the workman however heard the humming of a river on top of his head he got scared and turned back. When he returned to the surface, quite embarrassed with no calf to show for his efforts, there was golden sand in his shoes which he had unwittingly picked up along the way.

The calf turned up several days later when the farmer at Stóri-Núpur, a farm at several kilometres distance away from Hellar and on the other side of Þjórsá-river, heard mooing coming out from under his bed. Upon a closer look it turned out to be the calf that got lost in the cave, safe and sound except for its tail which it had somehow lost along the way.
