= Þjófafoss =

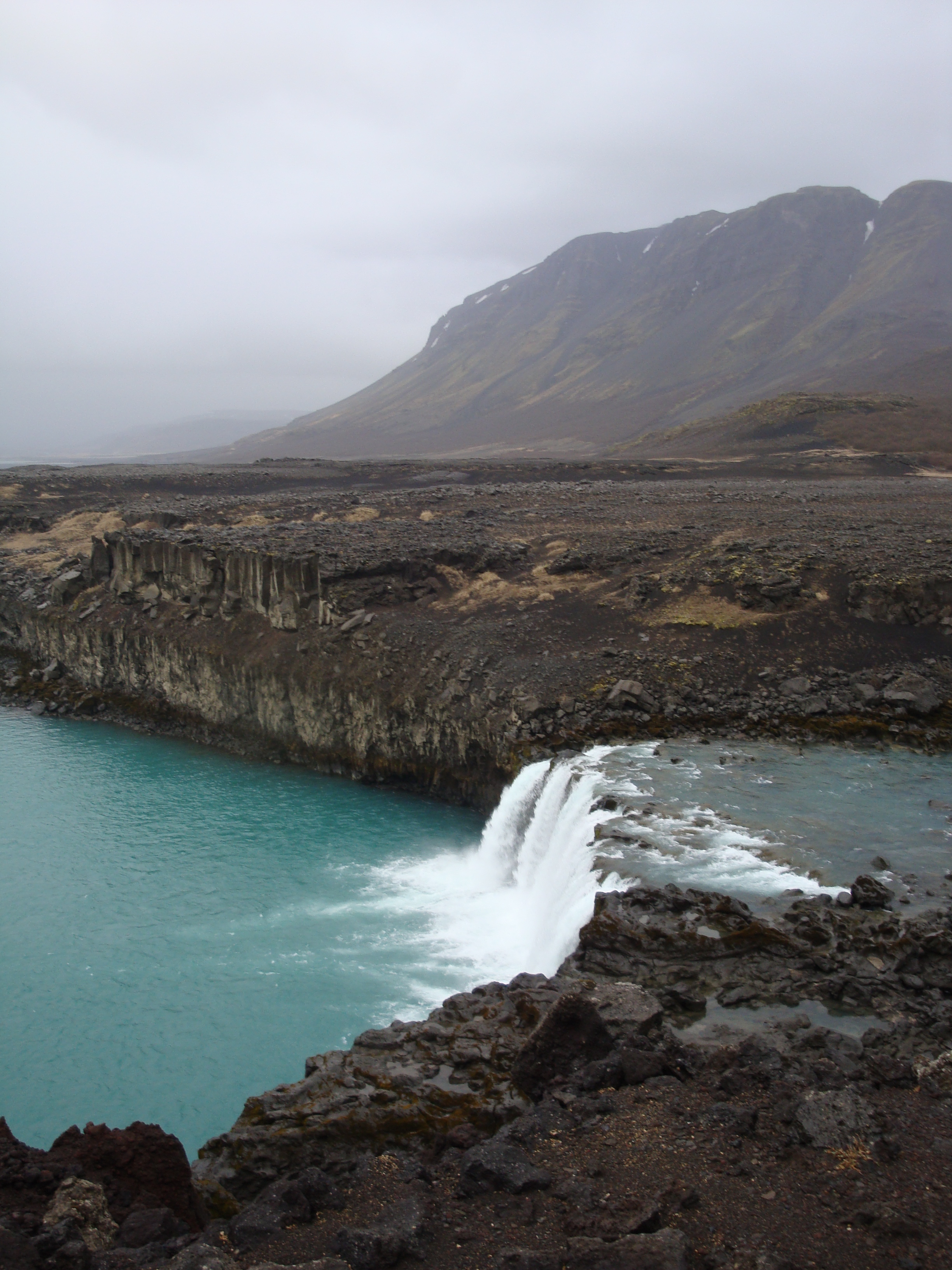
- Þjófafoss and Búrfell, as seen from the Merkurhraun lava fields

- Location within Iceland
- Location: South of Iceland
- Coordinates: 64°3′25″N 19°52′1″W

Þjófafoss (Icelandic pronunciation: [ˈθjouː(v)aˌfɔsː], "thieves' waterfall"; also Thjofafoss) is located on the river Þjórsá on the east side of the Merkurhraun lava fields in the south of Iceland, at the southwest tip of the hill Búrfell. A viewing point for the waterfall can be accessed by a gravel track that leads about 4 kilometres (2.5 mi) northwest from Route 26 or by a track that leads south from Route 32 past the hydroelectric power station Búrfellsstöð and Hjálparfoss.

== Gallery ==
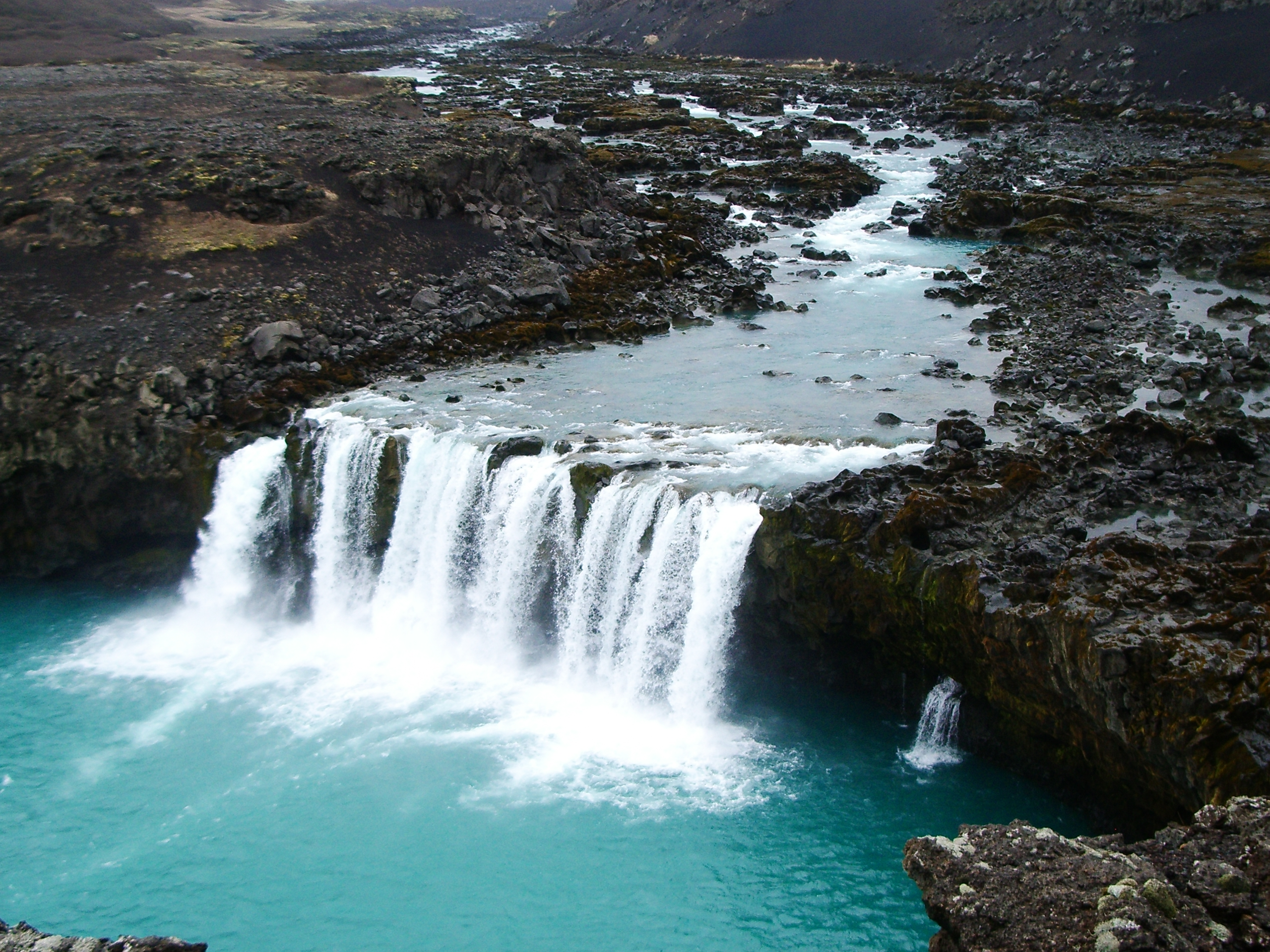
The view east from Merkurhraun showing Þjófafoss and Þjórsá.

== See also ==
- Waterfalls of Iceland
- List of waterfalls
