= Gjáin =

Coordinates: 64.15148°N 19.73835°W

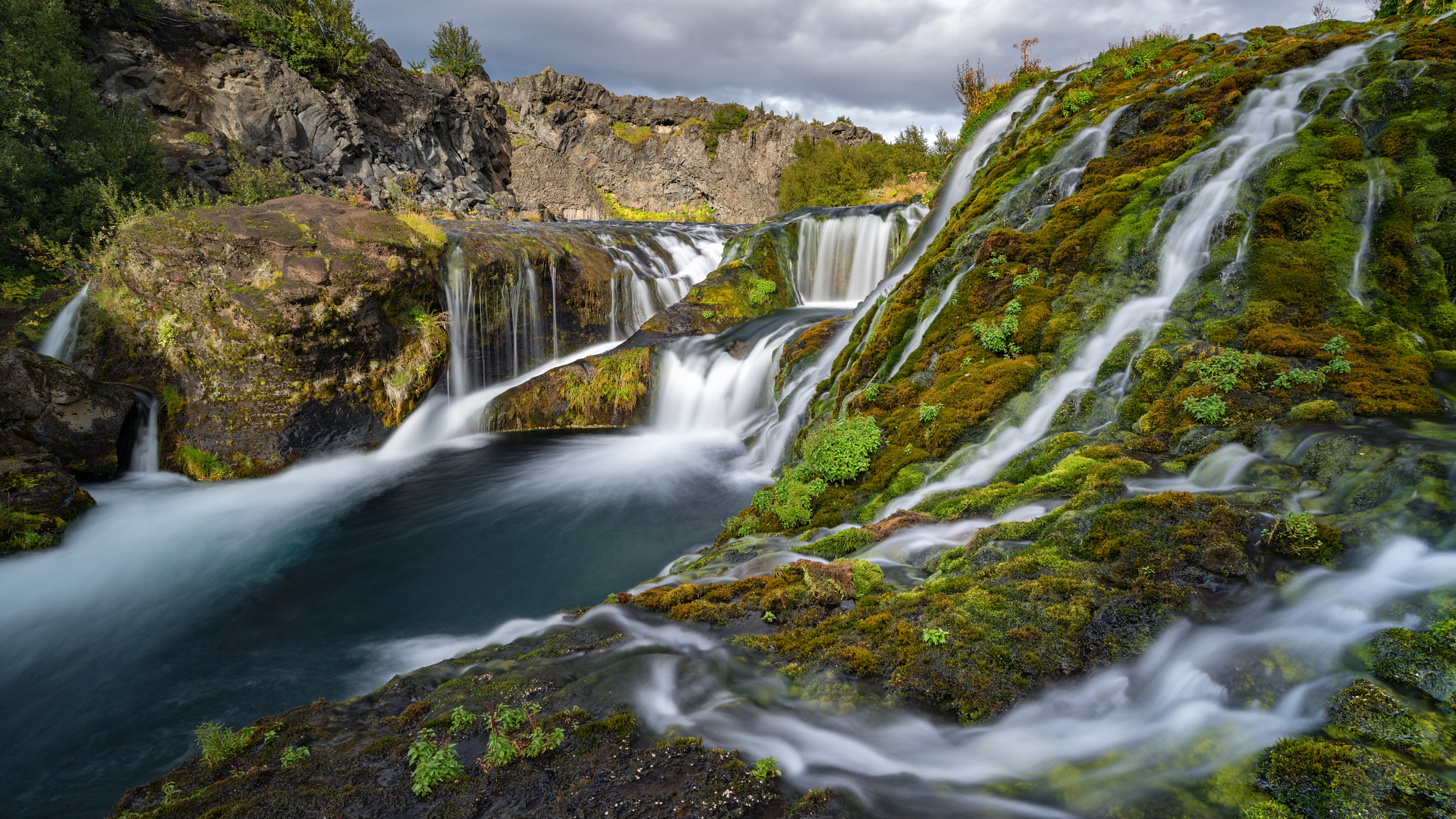
- Location: South of Iceland

Gjáin (Icelandic pronunciation: [ˈcauːɪn]) is a small valley with small waterfalls, ponds, and volcanic structures situated in Þjórsárdalur in the south of Iceland. It is to be found at about half an hour walking distance from the historical farm Þjóðveldisbærinn Stöng. Through the valley runs the river Rauðá with the waterfall Gjárfoss.

== See also ==
- Waterfalls of Iceland
- List of waterfalls
