= Urriðafoss =

Coordinates: 63°55′26″N 20°40′26″W

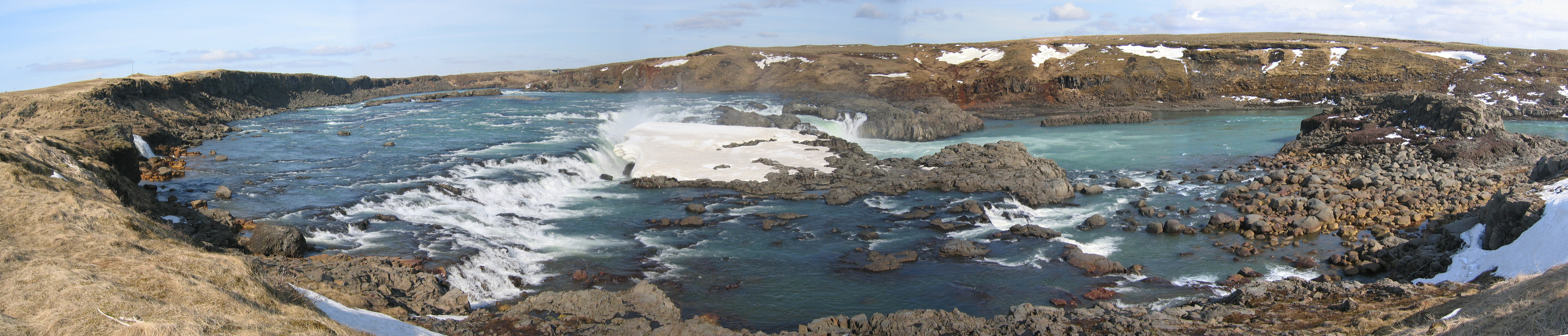
- Location: South of Iceland
- Average flow rate: 360 m³/s

Urriðafoss (Icelandic pronunciation: [ˈʏrːɪːðaˌfɔsː], "sea trout waterfall") is a waterfall located in the river Þjórsá in southwest Iceland. With a flow rate of 360 m³/s, it has the highest average water flow of any waterfall in Iceland, and the second highest in Europe behind the Rheinfall.

The Fossafélagið Títan company was given permission in 1927 to build a power plant in Urriðafoss in connection with a railway to Reykjavík from the waterfall. It did not happen but now Landsvirkjun is planning to build hydropower stations on the lower part of Þjórsár river, at Urriðafoss and Núpur.

The proposed Urriðafoss Power Plant is expected to have a capacity of approximately 125 MW and a power-generating capacity of 930 GWh per year. The powerhouse will be underground and a tunnel leading from the powerhouse will open out into Þjórsá river below Urriðafoss waterfall. The waterfall is expected to disappear if the powerhouse is built. Local residents in the area are protesting against the construction in an effort to save Urriðafoss.

== See also ==
- List of waterfalls
- List of waterfalls in Iceland
- List of waterfalls by flow rate
