= Hörður Ágústsson =

Famous Icelandic painter and historian

- Born: 4 February 1922
- Died: 10 September 2005 (aged 83)
- Education: Royal Danish Academy of Fine Arts
- Occupations: Painter; Architectural historian; Educator; Designer; Cultural critic
- Writing career
- Notable works: Íslensk byggingararfleifð (Icelandic Architectural Heritage) series; Skálholt: kirkjur (Skálholt: Churches); Þjóðveldisbærinn (design and construction oversight)
- Notable awards: Icelandic Literary Prize (1990, 1998); Honorary Doctorate, University of Iceland (1991)

Hörður Ágústsson (4 February 1922 – 10 September 2005) was an Icelandic painter, architectural historian, educator, and designer. He was a key figure in the introduction of geometric abstraction to Icelandic art and is recognized for his pioneering research into the nation's architectural heritage. His work across multiple disciplines had a significant influence on Iceland's cultural identity in the 20th century.

== Career ==
=== Visual Art ===
In the 1950s, after studying in Copenhagen and Paris, Hörður became a leading proponent of geometric abstraction in Iceland, influenced by the principles of the Bauhaus school. He developed a unique technique using colored adhesive tape instead of paint to create hard-edged, formal compositions. He retired from his art practice in 1978 to dedicate his focus to historical research.

=== Architectural History and Preservation ===
Beginning in the 1960s, Hörður conducted extensive research into Iceland's building traditions. He elevated the study of vernacular structures like the Icelandic turf house, arguing for their architectural significance. His work on the historical churches of Skálholt was foundational for architectural preservation in Iceland. He was a key figure in the establishment of the State Architectural Heritage Committee and designed the reconstructed Viking-era farmstead, Þjóðveldisbærinn.

=== Cultural and Educational Roles ===
Hörður was a co-founder, editor, and the primary designer for Birtingur, an Icelandic modernist cultural journal, from 1955 to 1968. He was also an influential teacher and director at the Icelandic College of Art and Handicrafts for nearly three decades, mentoring a generation of artists and designers.

== Major Publications and Awards ==
=== Selected publications ===
Title (Icelandic)	English Translation	Notes	Ref.
Íslensk byggingararfleifð I & II	Icelandic Architectural Heritage I & II	—	
Skálholt: kirkjur	Skálholt: Churches	—	
Skálholt: skrúði og áhöld	Skálholt: Vestments and Implements	co-authored with Kristján Eldjárn	
Dómsdagur og helgir menn á Hólum	Doomsday and Holy Men at Hólar	—	

=== Awards and recognition ===
- Icelandic Literary Prize: Received twice for non-fiction, in 1990 and 1998.
- Honorary Doctorate: Awarded by the University of Iceland in 1991 for his work in architectural history.

He was a fellow of the Norwegian Academy of Science and Letters from 1991.
