= Búrfell hydroelectric power station =

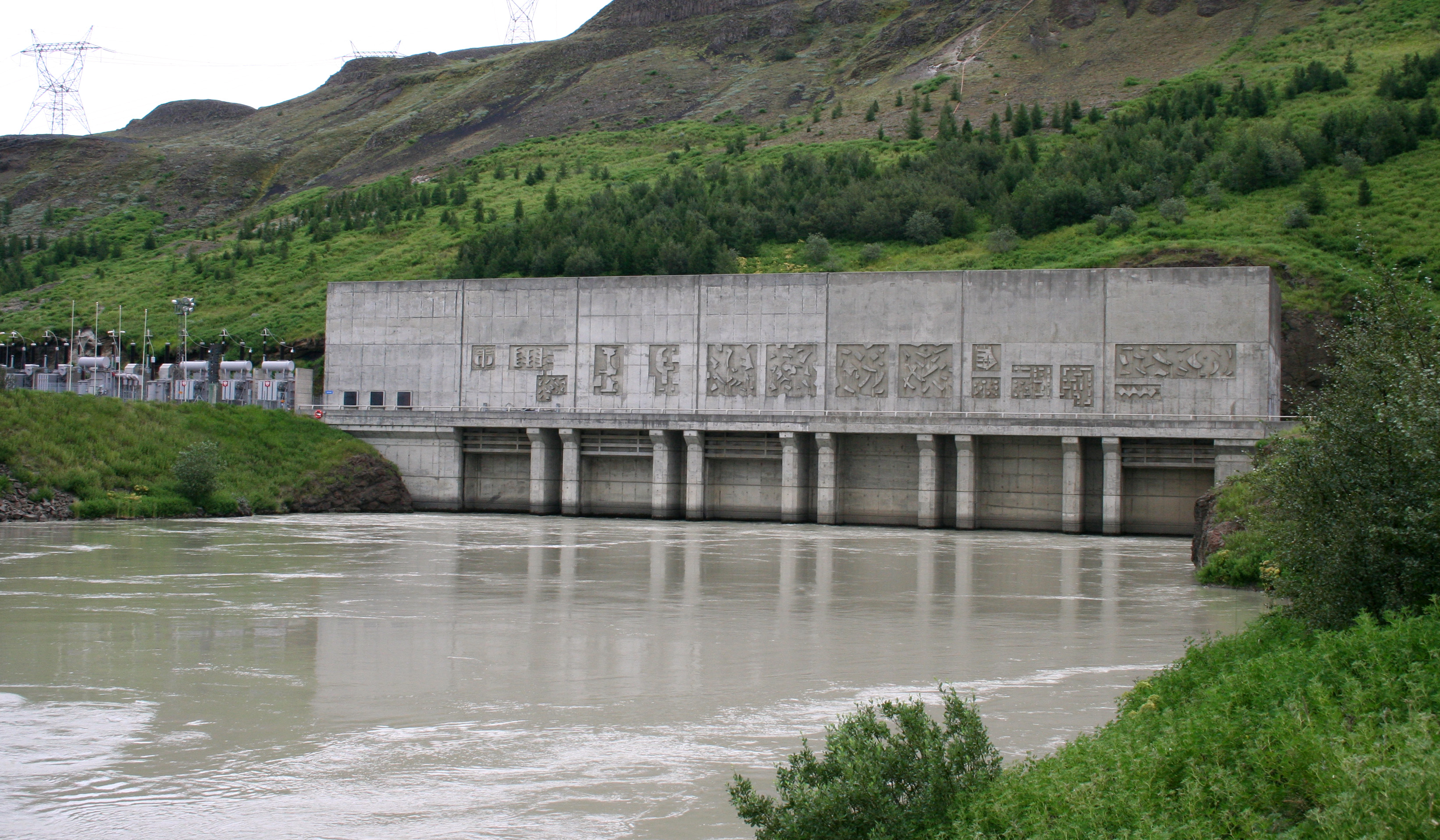

- Location within Iceland
- Interactive map of Búrfell hydroelectric power station
- Country: Iceland
- Coordinates: 64°6′15.3″N 19°50′15.61″W
- Status: Operational

Dam and spillways
- Length: 370 m (1,214 ft)

Reservoir
- Creates: Bjarnalón
- Surface area: 1.18 km^{2} (0.46 sq mi)
- Normal elevation: 270 m (886 ft)

The Búrfell hydroelectric power plant (Búrfellsstöð or Búrfellsvirkjun in Icelandic) is a run-of-river hydroelectric power plant located in the Þjórsá valley in southwest Iceland. It is operated by Landsvirkjun. It was, since its construction in 1969, until the construction of the Kárahnjúka power plant in 2008, the largest power plant in Iceland with a capacity of 270 MW (increased to 370 MW in 2018).

It was mainly built to supply electricity to an aluminum factory located in Straumsvík, 3 km west of Hafnarfjörður.

== History ==
The idea of harnessing the energy of the Þjórsá River at Búrfell Mountain was proposed in 1917. For two years, the Norwegian engineer Gotfred Sætersmoen conducted a study on the development of hydroelectricity in the Þjórsá region. He proposed five stations, Búrfell being by far the most important.

In 1960, the project was seriously considered. A project of this magnitude could be economically very interesting if the electricity could be used quickly, but Icelandic consumption was not increasing fast enough to make the project viable. The country then had the idea of supplying this electricity to energy-intensive industries. In 1966, an agreement was signed with Alusuisse for the construction of the aluminum plant in Straumsvík and the green light was given for the plant.

Construction began in June 1966. The power plant started to deliver its power in 1969, with the commissioning of 3 turbines of 35 MW each. The capacity was doubled in 1972 with the commissioning of the last three turbines, bringing the installed power to 210 W. The plant was renovated between 1997 and 1999, bringing its capacity to 270 MW.

== Extension ==
In the 2010s, the project has undergone an important extension, with the construction by Landsvirkjun of a second hydroelectric power station not far from the existing one. This is a response to the observed increase in the flow of the Þjórsá: it is indeed fed in large part by meltwater from glaciers, whose volume is increasing due to global warming. The average flow of Icelandic rivers should increase by 15% between 2015 and 2050.

Work on the extension, named Búrfell II, began in the spring of 2016 and will last two years. With an installed capacity of 100 MW, the plant was inaugurated on June 28, 2018, in the presence of Icelandic President Guðni Th. Jóhannesson.

== Specifications ==
=== Dam ===
The power station exploits a catchment area of 6,400 km^{2} (2,500 sq mi), offering an average annual flow of 340 m^{3}/s. A 370 m-long (1,210 ft) dam diverts the course of the Þjórsá, which used to flow around the Búrfell mountain from the south. It gave birth to a small reservoir, Lake Bjarnalón, with an area of 1.18 km^{2} (0.46 sq mi). Its altitude fluctuates between and 241 and 247 m (791 and 810 ft).

=== Búrfell I Power Plant ===
From the Bjarnalón lake, the water reaches a 1,564 m-long (5,131 ft) and 10 m-diameter (33 ft) intake gallery. After a 115 m (377 ft) drop in a pressurized penstock, it reaches the power plant, where it drives 6 Francis turbines of 45 MW each. The total equipment flow is 300 m^{3}/s. The water is then released near Hjálparfoss, where it joins the Þjórsá and returns to its normal course. The electricity production reaches an average of 2,300 GWh/year.

=== Búrfell II Power Plant ===
The second plant is underground and has a single 100 MW Francis turbine supplied by Andritz. However, the plant is designed to accommodate an additional 40 MW in the future. The water, which comes from the same reservoir as for the historical power plant, flows through a 370 m-long (1,210 ft) intake tunnel and then drops 110 m (360 ft) into the penstock. The turbinable flow is 92 m^{3}/s. At the outlet of the power station, it is evacuated via a 450 m-long (1,480 ft) escape tunnel, then rejoins the main course of the Þjórsá via a 2.2 km-long (1.4 mi) canal.

The electrical production of the extension should be around 300 GWh/year.

== See also ==
- Hydroelectric power station in Iceland
- Landsvirkjun
