= Hjálparfoss =

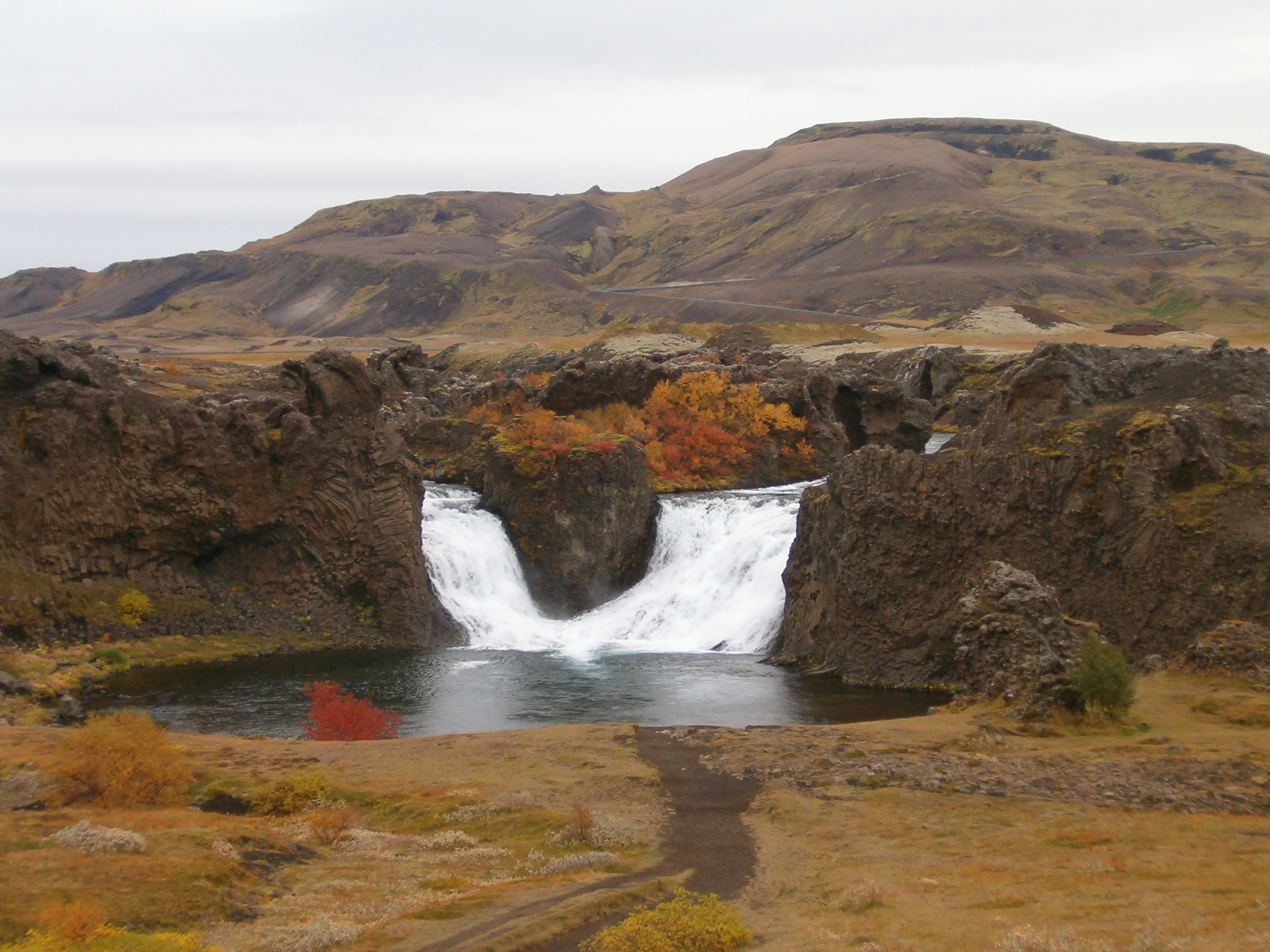

- Location within Iceland
- Location: South of Iceland
- Coordinates: 64°6′58″N 19°51′04″W
- Number of drops: 2

Hjálparfoss (Icelandic pronunciation: [ˈçaul̥parˌfɔsː]) is one of several waterfalls in the south of Iceland situated in the lava fields north of the stratovolcano Hekla near the point where the rivers Fossá and Þjórsá join. Hjálparfoss is located about 30 kilometres (19 mi) east of the village Flúðir and can be reached by a gravel road off Route 32 that winds through the Vikrar lava fields. About 5 kilometres (3.1 mi) south of Hjálparfoss lies Þjófafoss; further east are Háifoss on the Fossá and Tangafoss on the Þjórsá.

Just downstream from Hjálparfoss is Iceland's second-largest hydroelectric power station, Búrfellsstöð.

== Gallery ==
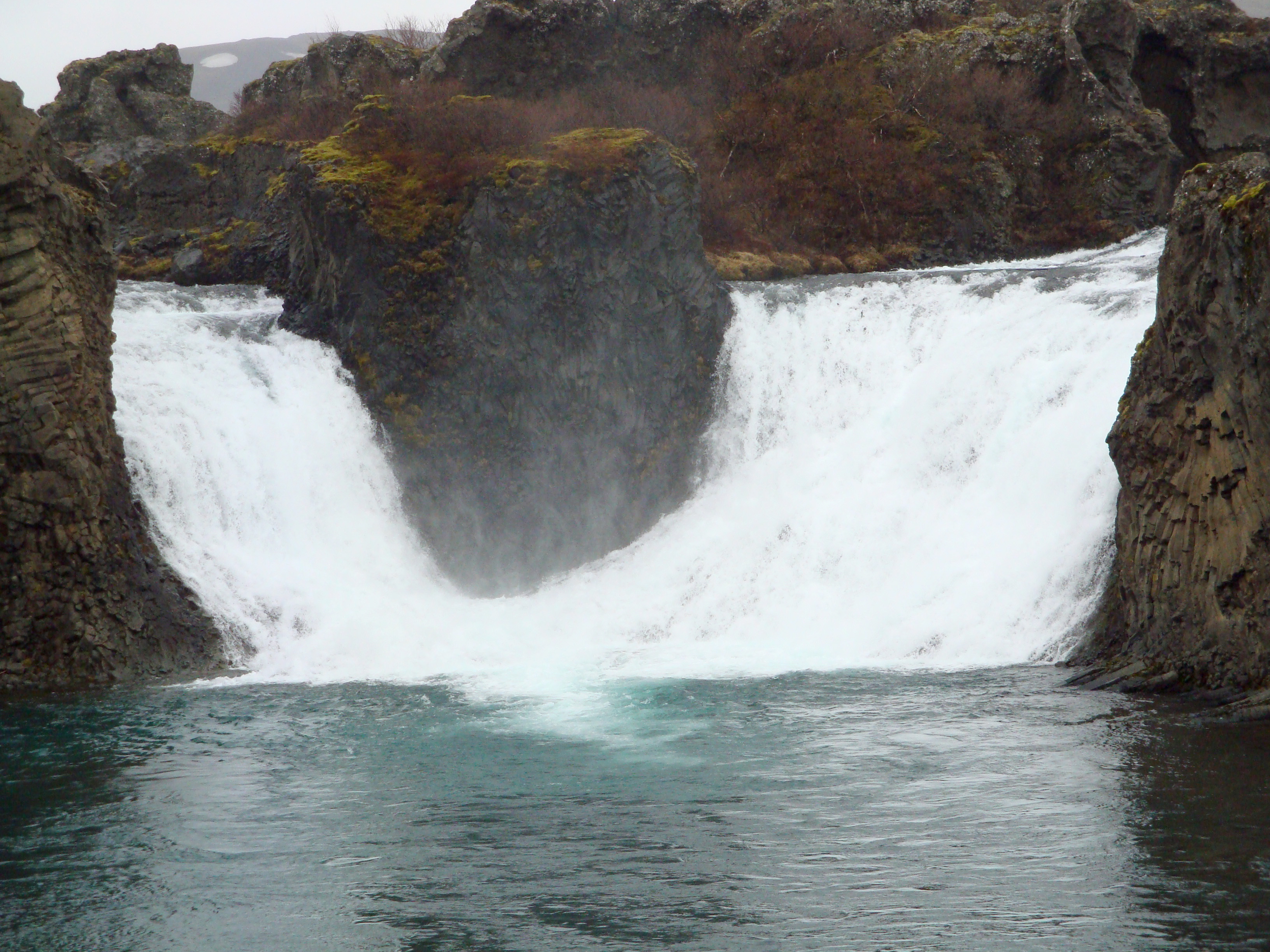
The waters of Fossá merging in the basin of Hjálparfoss.

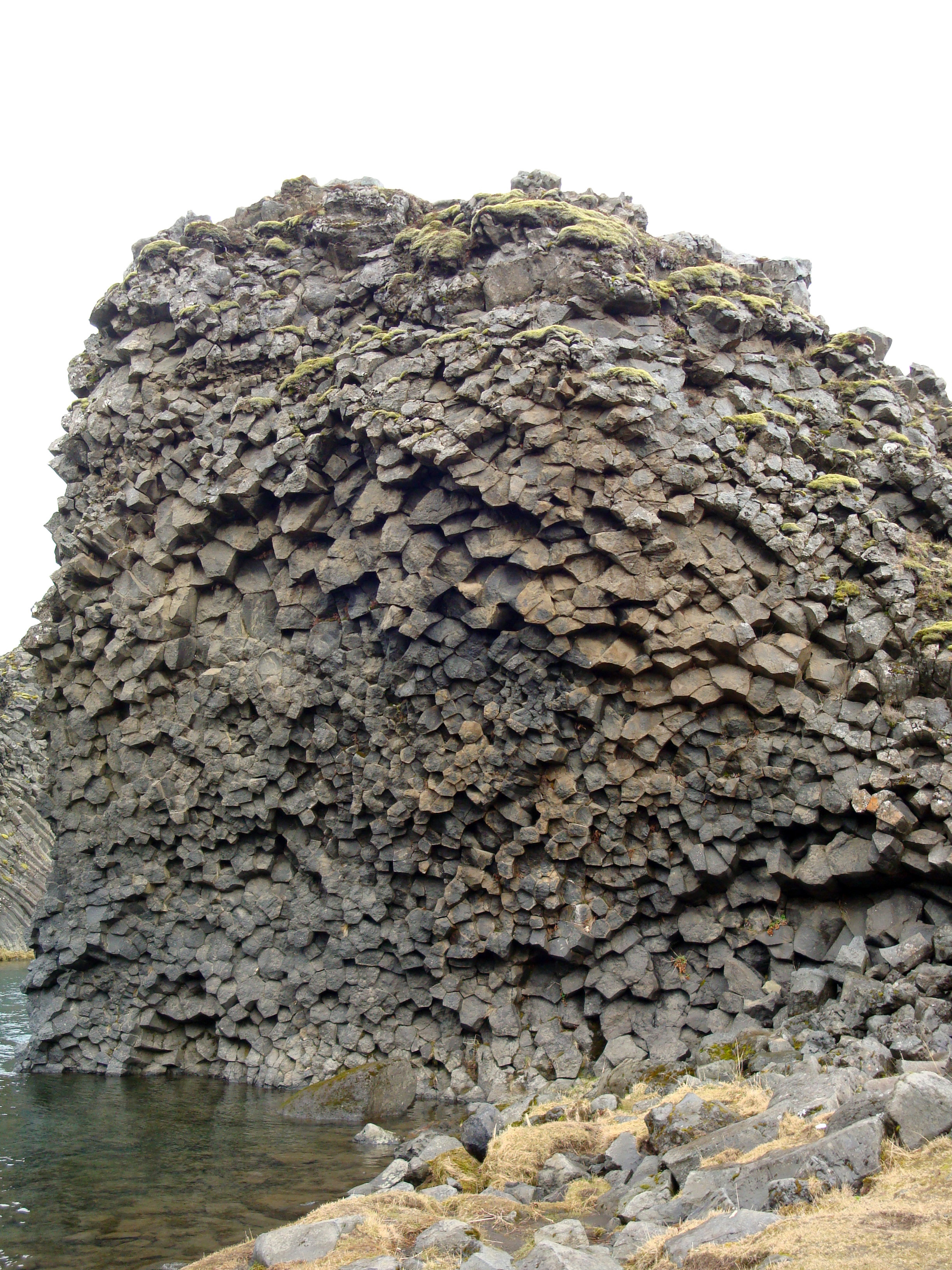
Some of the basalt columns surrounding the basin of Hjálparfoss.

== See also ==
- Waterfalls of Iceland
- List of waterfalls
