= Kerið =

Volcanic crater lake in Iceland

- Volcanic crater
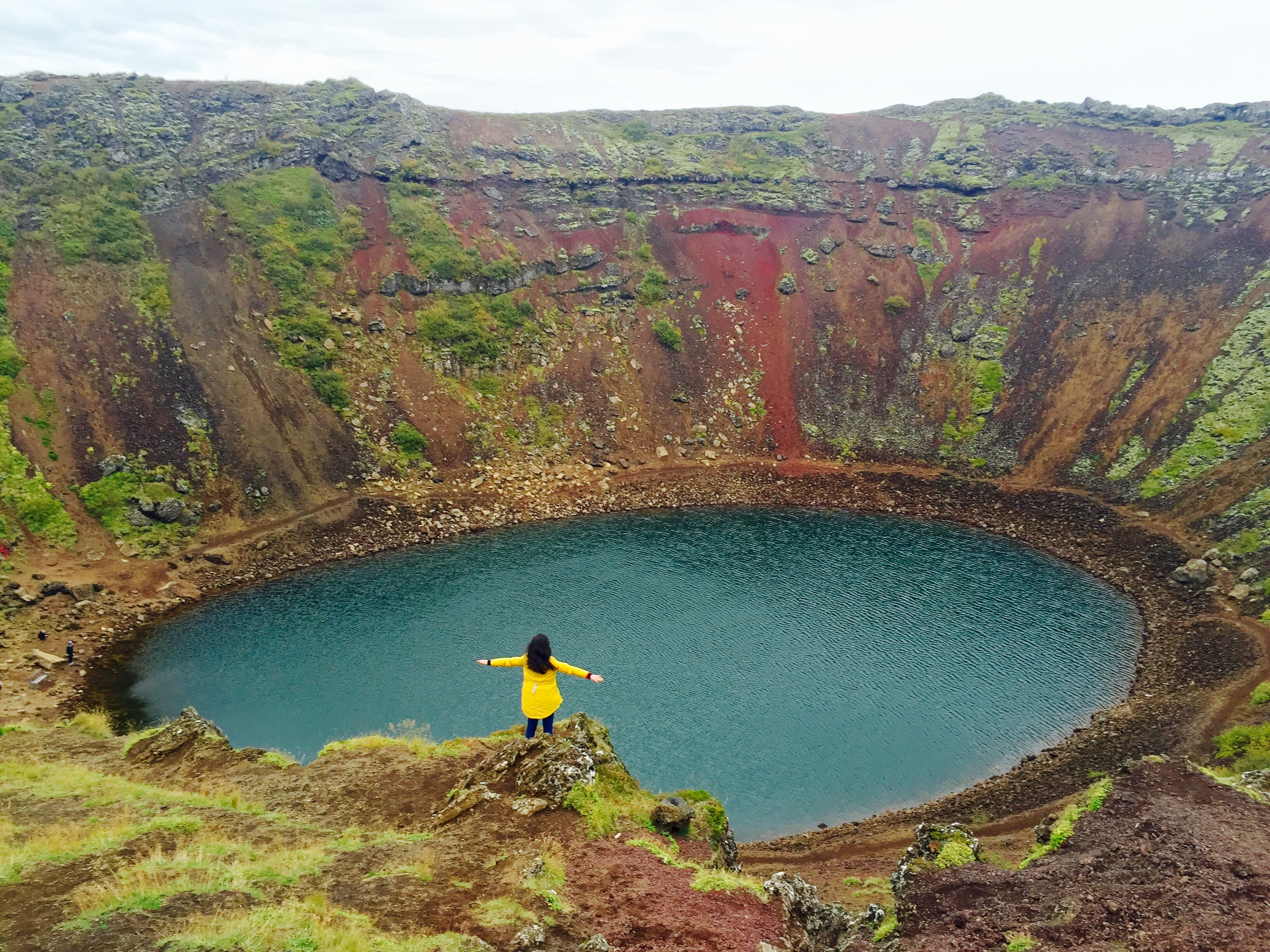

- Location within Iceland
- Coordinates: 64.041°N 20.885°W
- Location: South Iceland

Dimensions
  - Width: 170 m (560 ft)
  - Depth: 55 m (180 ft)

Kerið (Icelandic pronunciation: [ˈcʰɛːrɪθ]; also Kerith or Kerid) is a volcanic crater lake located in the Grímsnes area in south Iceland, along the Golden Circle. It is one of several crater lakes in the area, known as Iceland's Western Volcanic Zone, which includes the Reykjanes peninsula and the Langjökull Glacier, created as the land moved over a localized hotspot, but it is the one that has the most visually recognizable caldera still intact. The site is a popular area for tourists in Iceland.

== Geology ==
Kerið is the northernmost of four craters situated along an 800-meter fissure called the Tjarnarhólar [ˈtʰja(r)tnarˌhouːlar̥] row. It was formed through explosive volcanic activity (classified as a maar) and is elliptical, measuring approximately 55 m (180 ft) deep, 170 m (560 ft) wide, and 270 m (890 ft) across. The wall of the crater consists of basalt, formed following the cooling of lava, and scoria. Sources differ as to when the explosion occurred that created the crater, ranging from 6,420 years ago to 9,000 years ago.

While most of the crater is steep-walled with little vegetation, one wall is sloped more gently and blanketed with a deep moss. The sloped wall can be descended easily. The lake at the bottom of the crater is fairly shallow (6–14 meters, depending on the level of groundwater); due to minerals from the soil, the water appears aquamarine. Researchers have identified 10 taxa of zooplankton in the lake, primarily from the Rotifera phylum.

== Tourism ==
The land on which the crater sits is owned by a private company, Arctic Adventures, which bought the site in 2023. The company charges an entrance fee to see the crater of 700 ISK (as of March 2026).

== Gallery ==
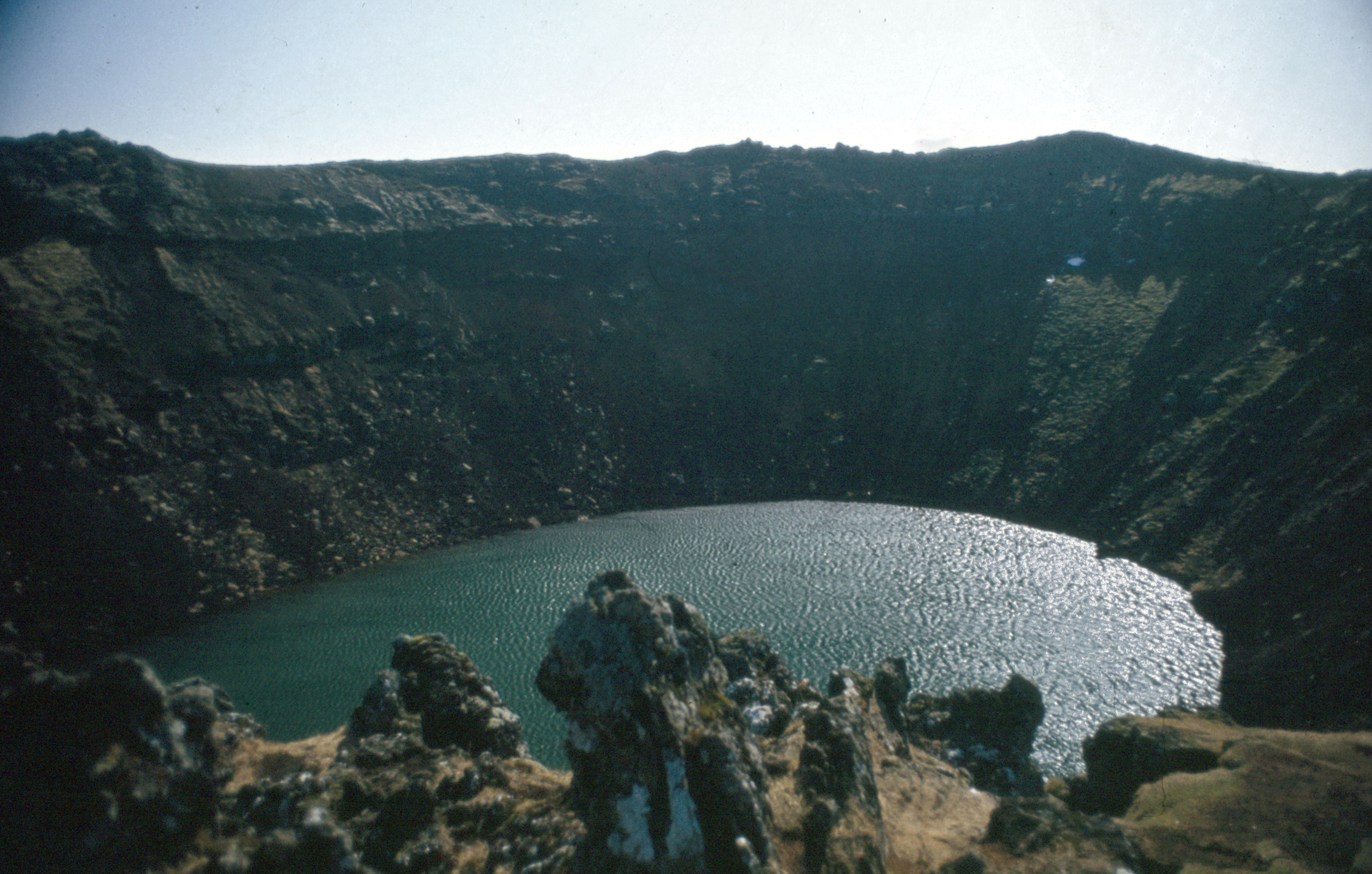
Kerið in April 1980

Kerið frozen over in early April

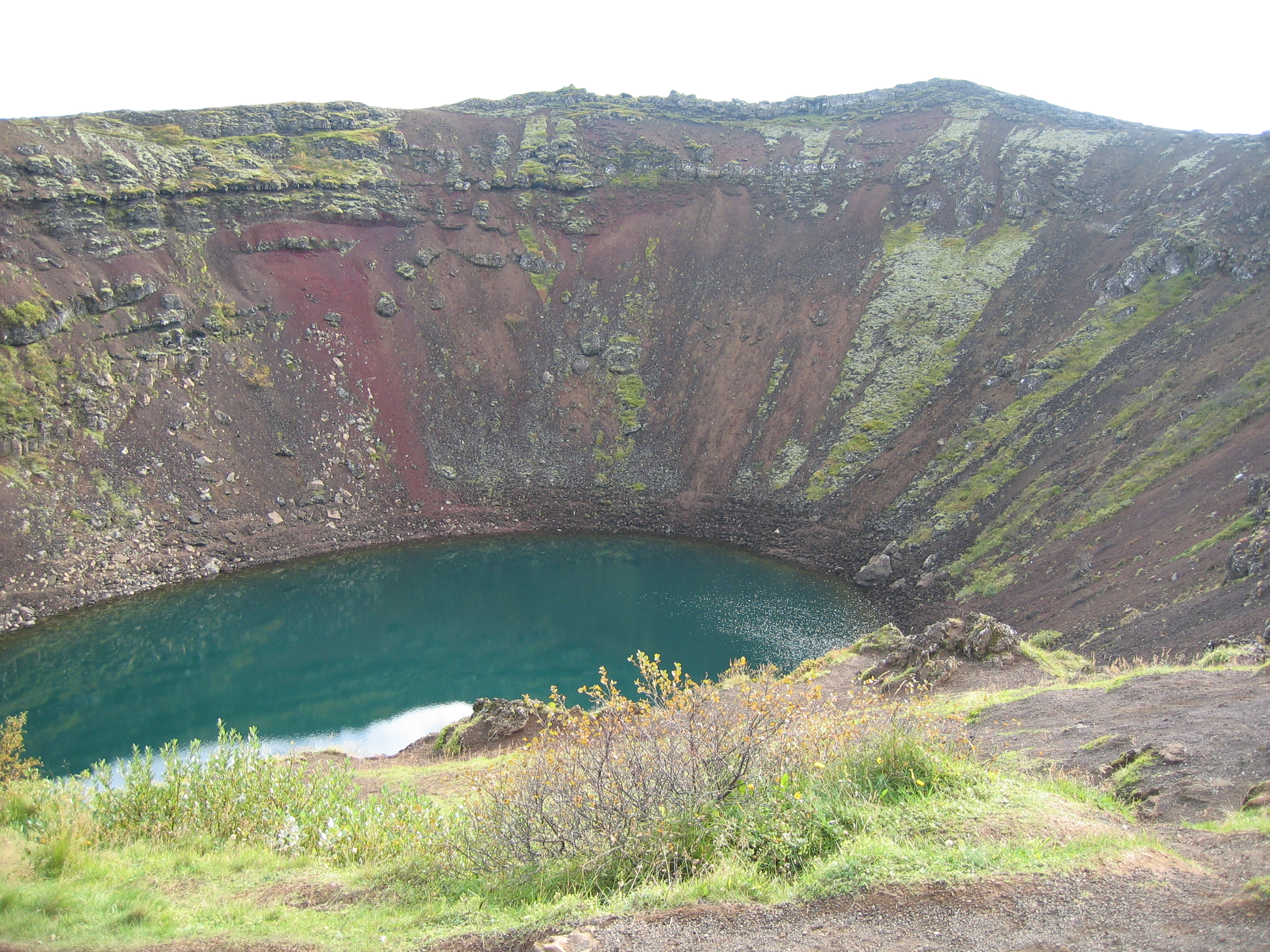
Kerið in September

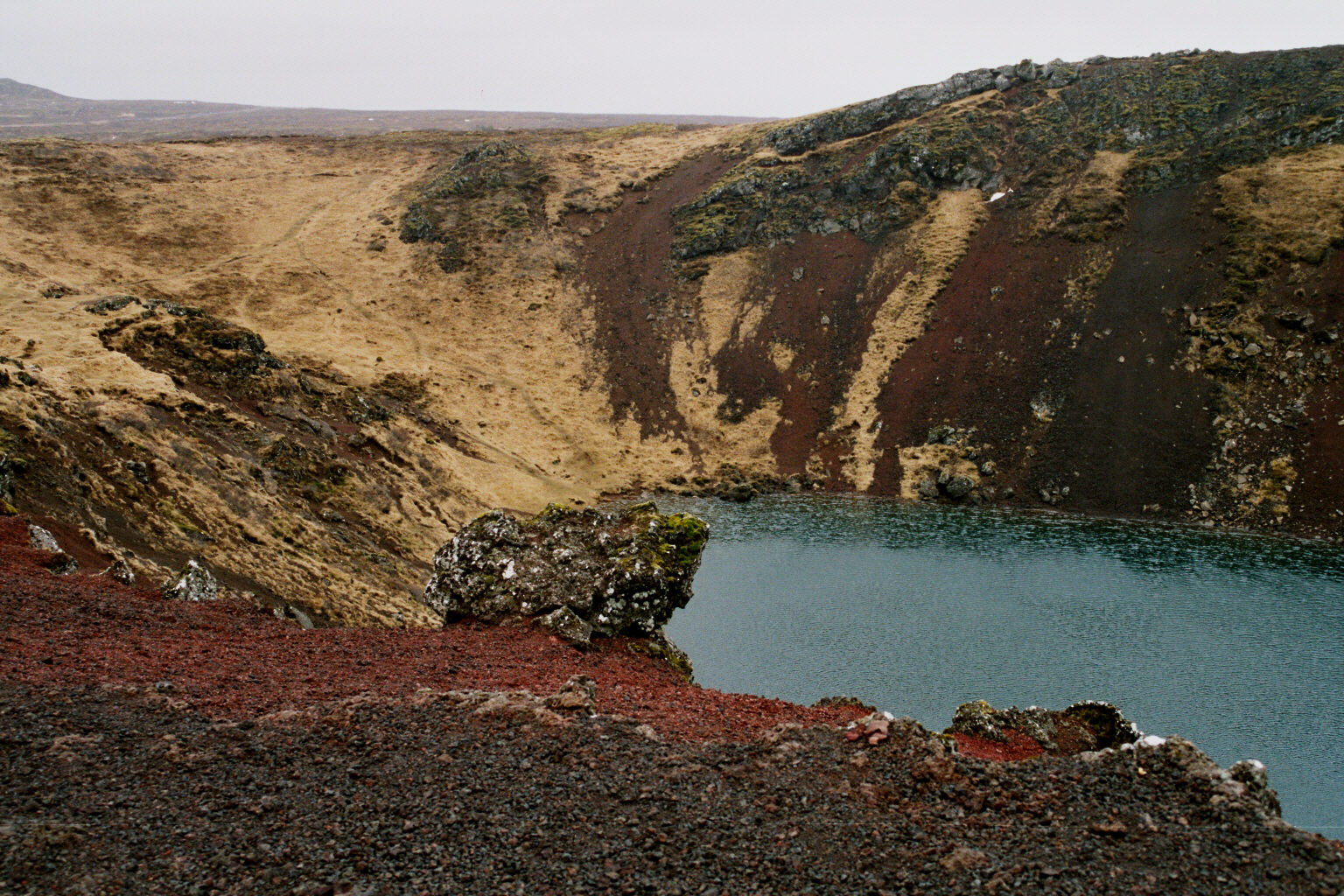
Kerið in April

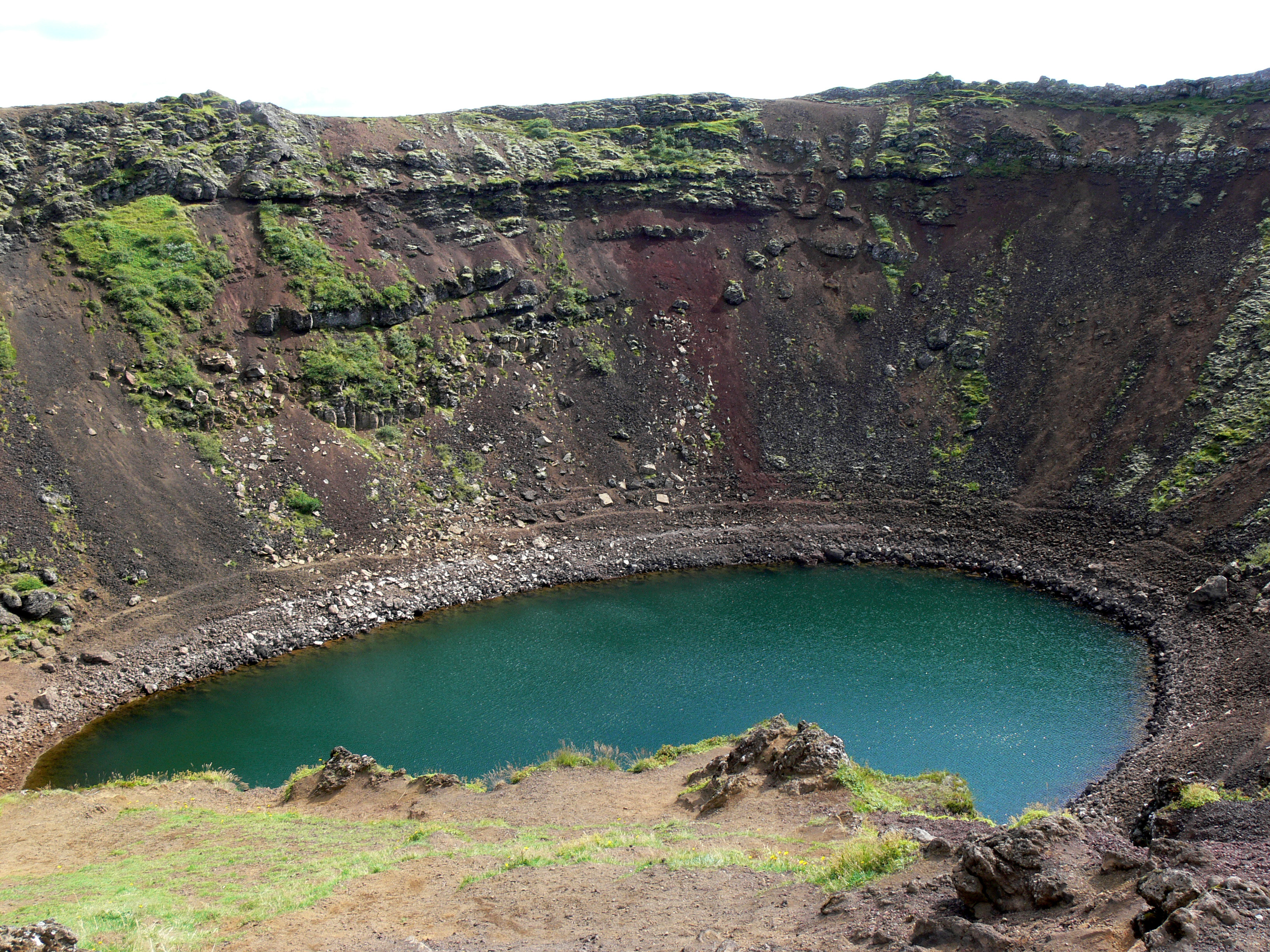
Kerið in August

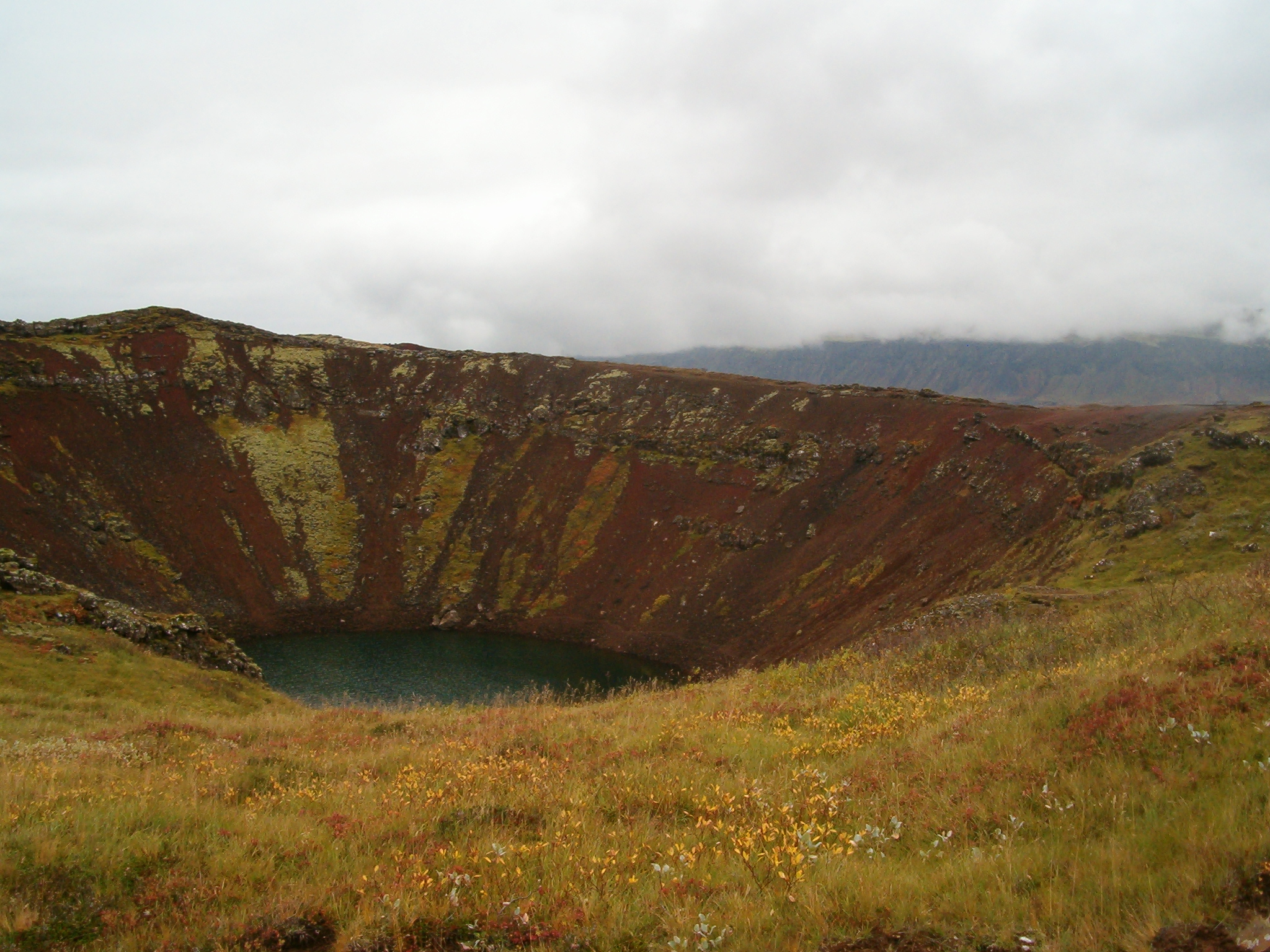
Kerið

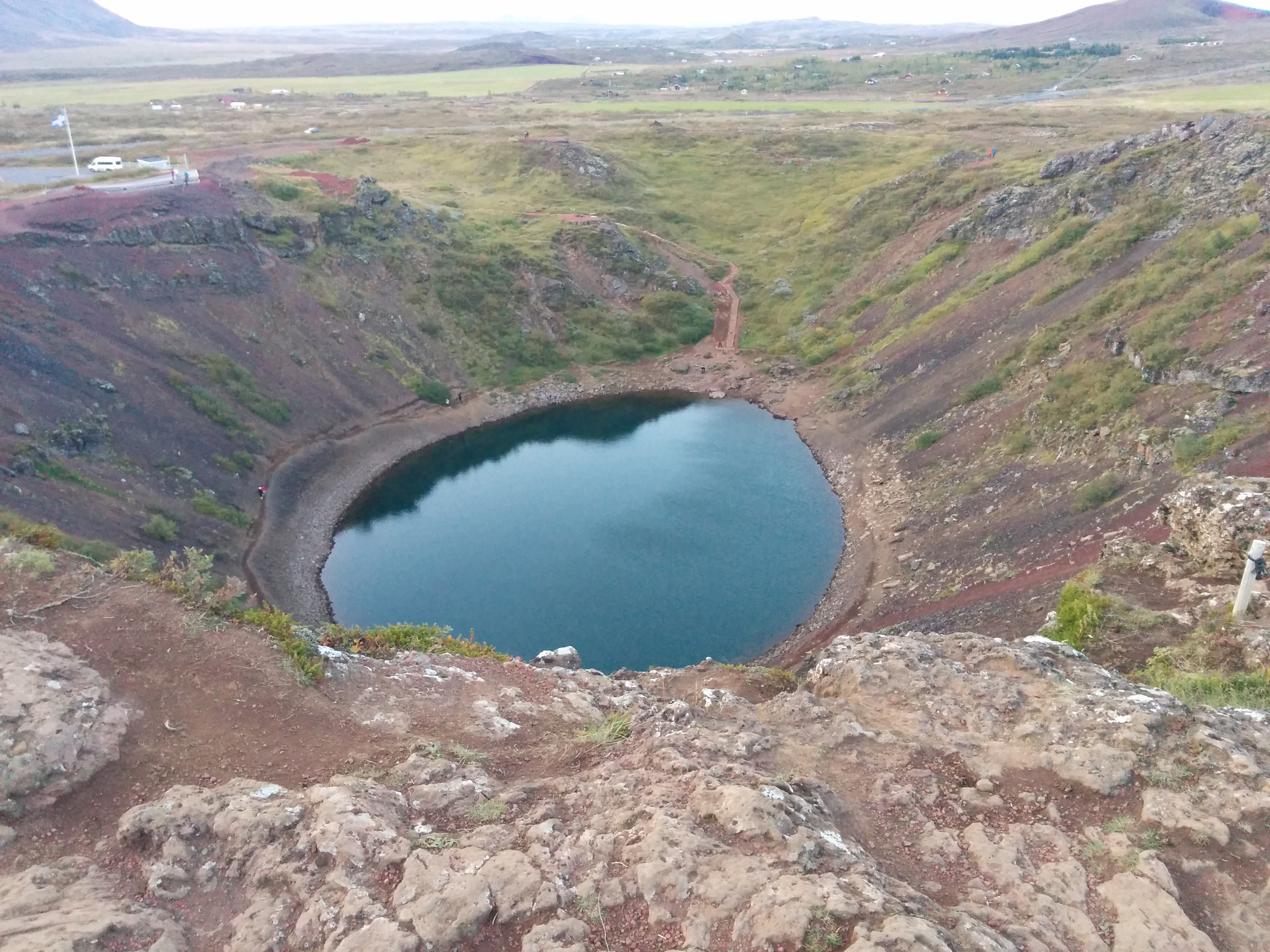
Kerið

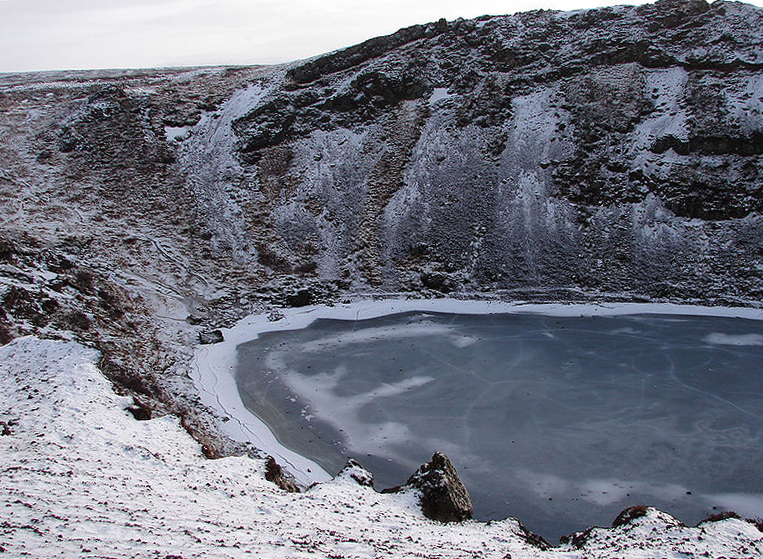
Kerið in early March

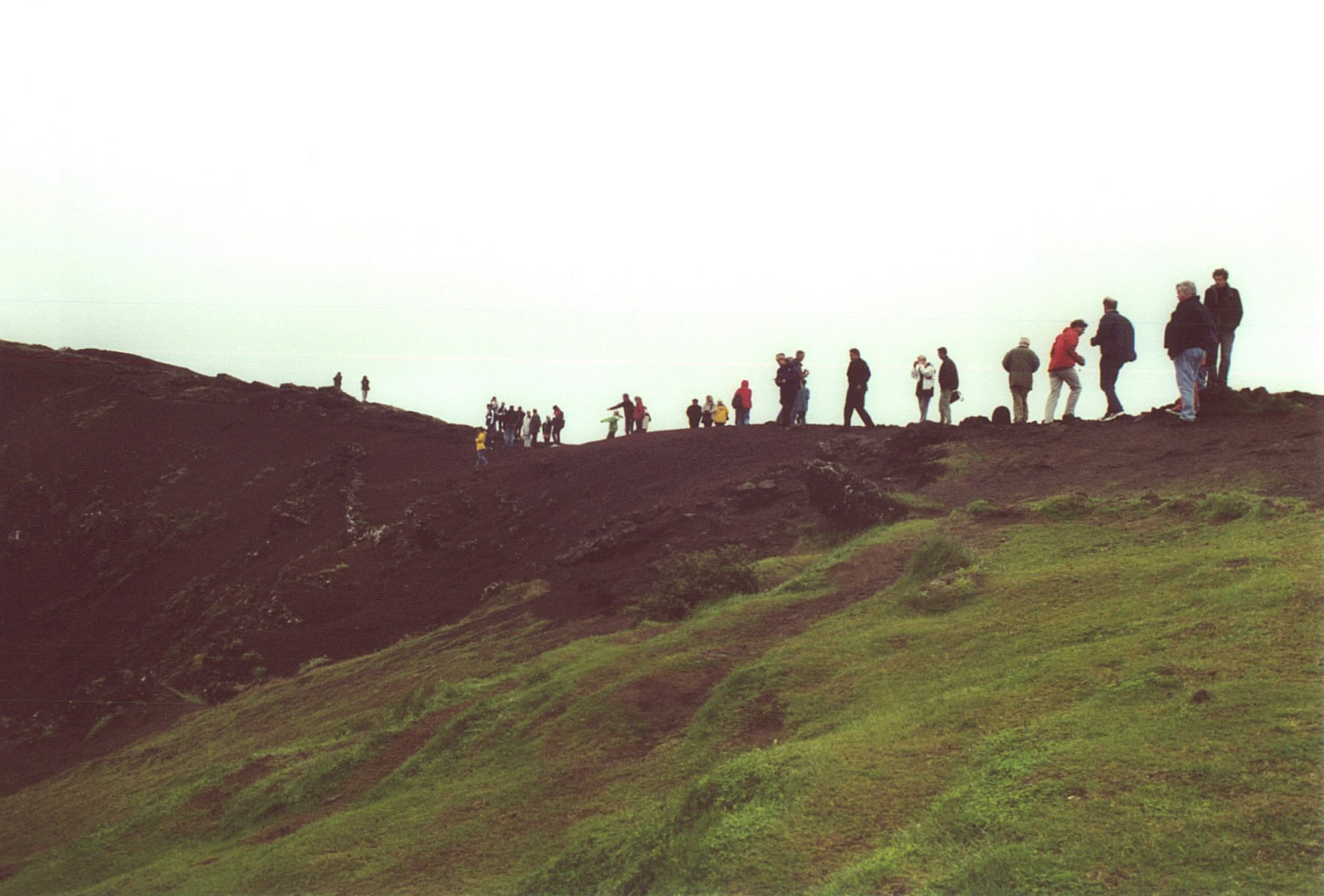
Tourists on the edge of Kerið in July

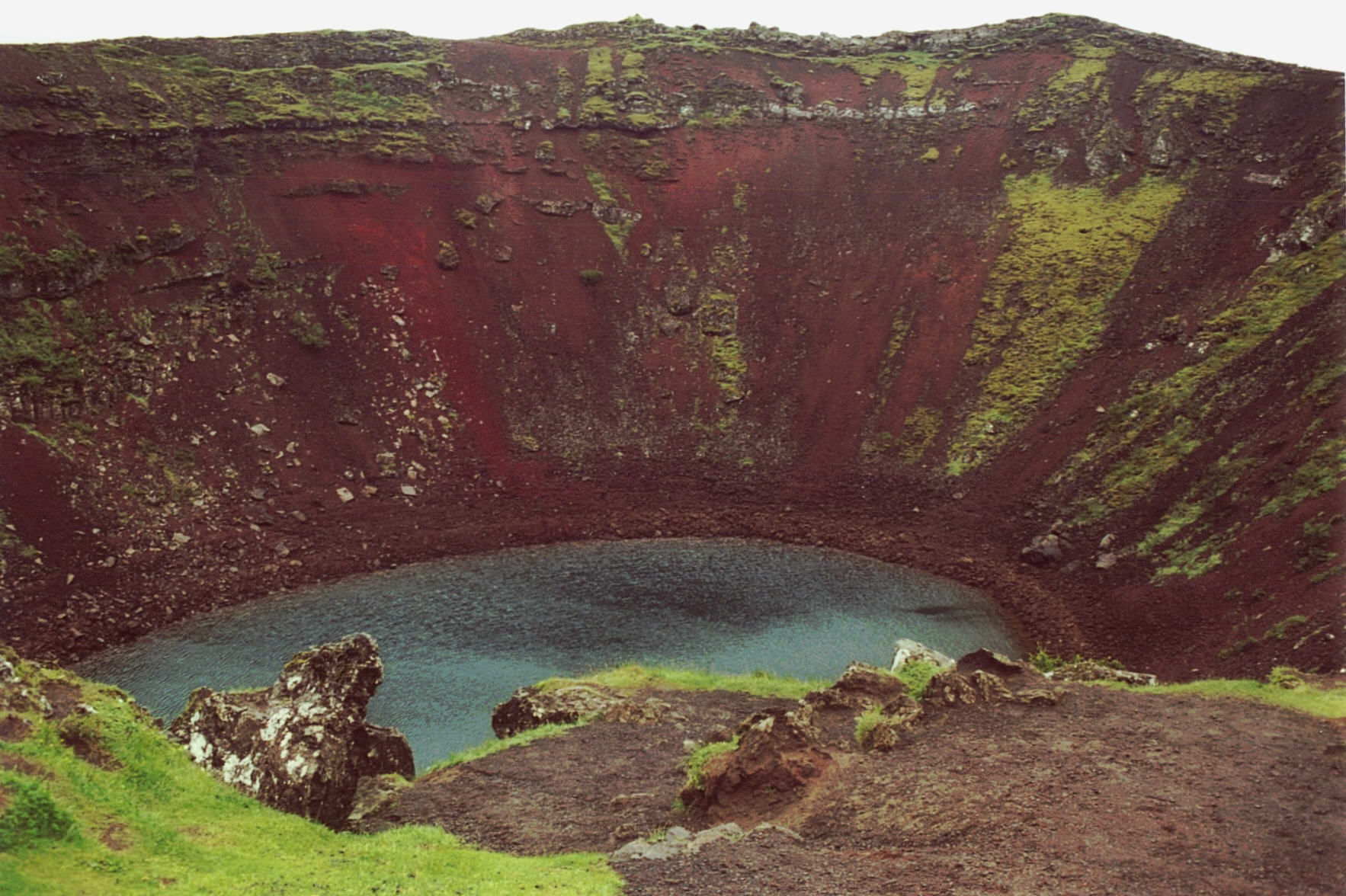
Kerið in July

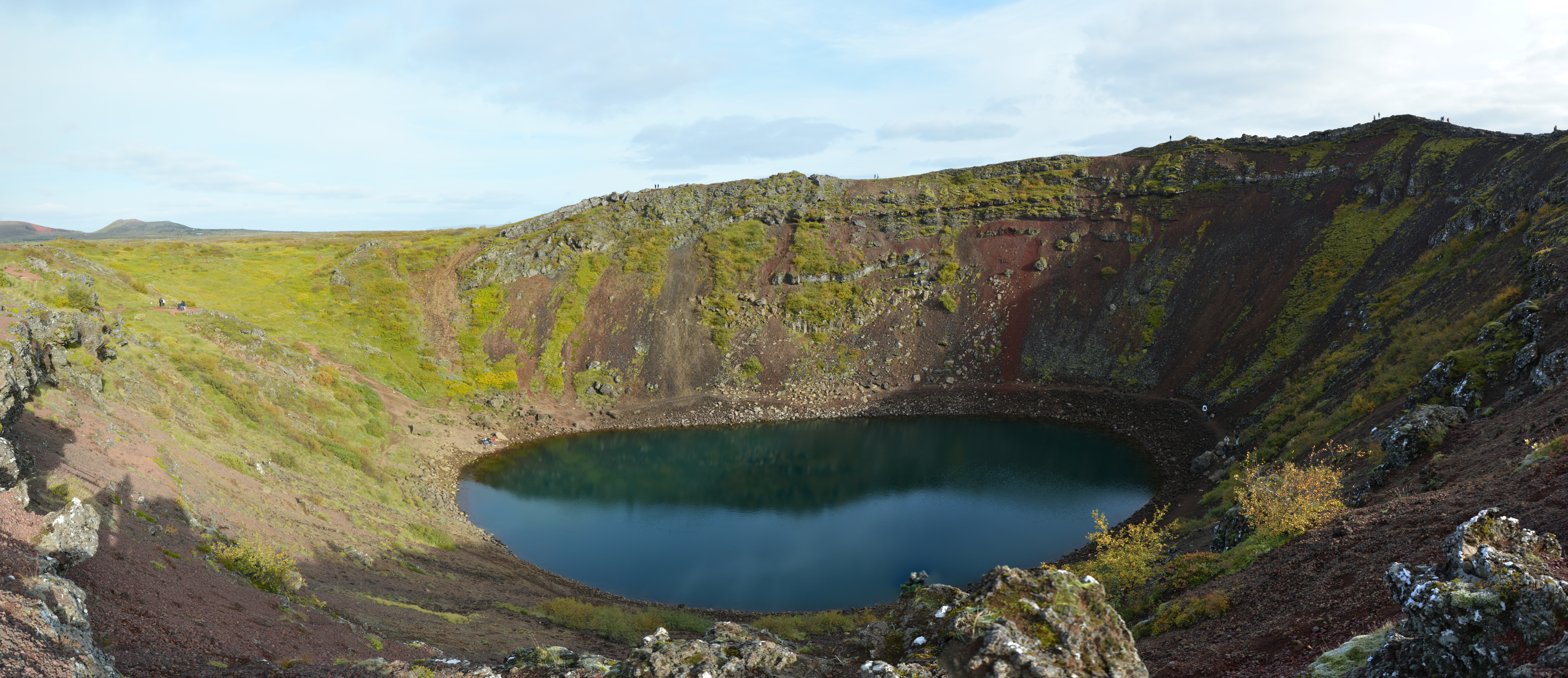

== Sources ==
- Jakobsson, S.P. (1966). "The Grimsnés Lavas SW-Iceland" (PDF). Acta Naturalia Islandica. II (6). Náttúrufraedistofnun Íslands/Museum rerum naturalium Reyknavikensis: 5–35.
