= Grímsnes =

Volcanic system in southwestern Iceland

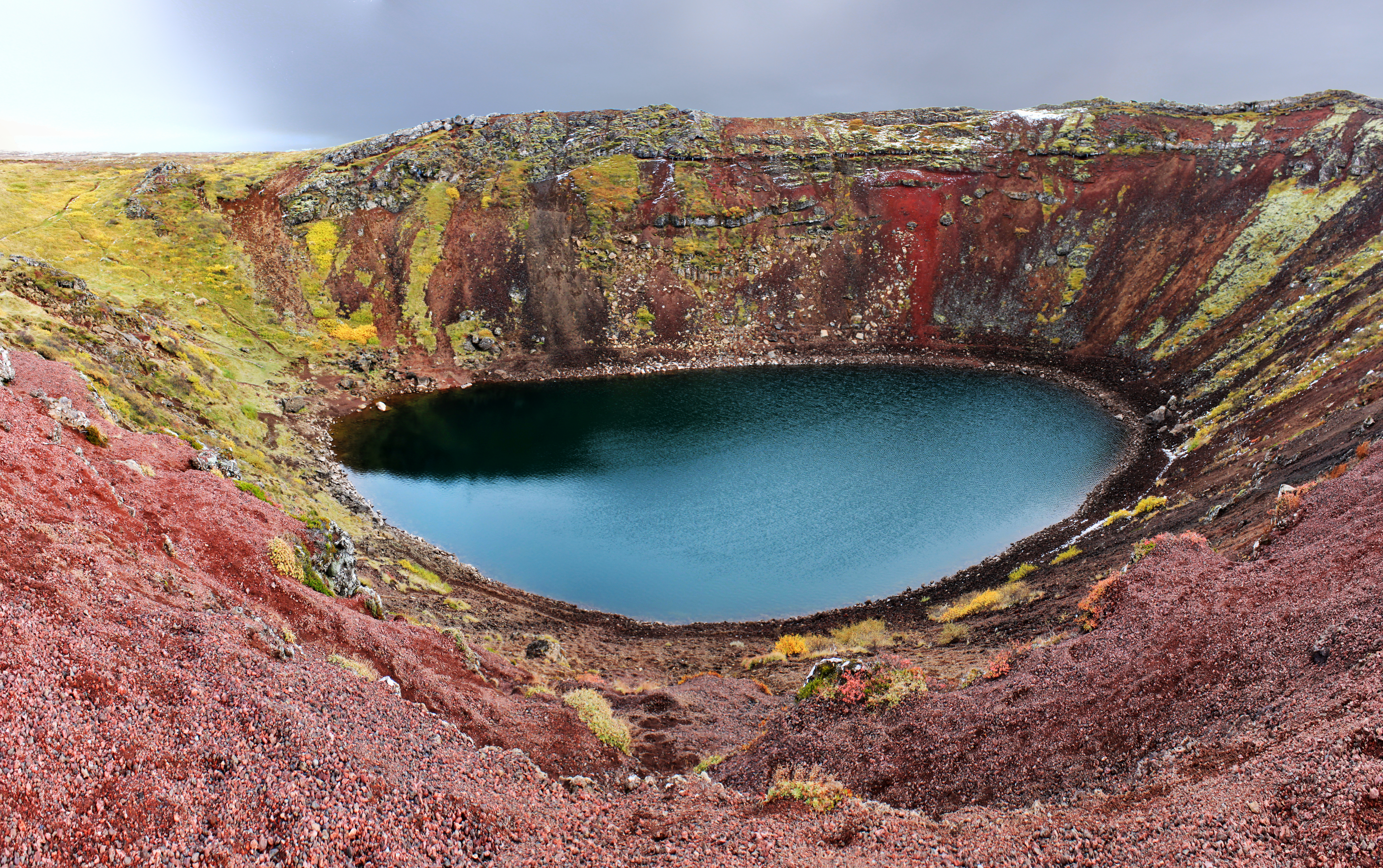
- Kerið - One of many volcanic craters within the volcanic system.

Highest point
- Elevation: 214 metres (702 ft)
- Coordinates: 64°2′N 20°52′W

Geography

Geology
- Mountain type: Crater rows
- Last eruption: ~3500 BCE
- Selected geological features near the Grímsnes volcanic system (red outline) and its Holocene lava flows (violet shading) and vents (violet outlines). Legend: Other shading shows: '"`UNIQ--templatestyles-00000008-QINU`"' calderas; '"`UNIQ--templatestyles-00000009-QINU`"' central volcanoes; '"`UNIQ--templatestyles-0000000A-QINU`"' fissure swarms; '"`UNIQ--templatestyles-0000000B-QINU`"' subglacial terrain above 1,100 m (3,600 ft); '"`UNIQ--templatestyles-0000000C-QINU`"' seismically active areas; Clicking on the rectangle in the image enlarges to full window and enables mouse-over with more detail.; '"`UNIQ--ref-0000000D-QINU`"'

Grímsnes (Icelandic pronunciation: [ˈkrimsˌnɛːs]) is a relatively small fissure or crater row volcanic system located in South Iceland, located south–east of Lake Thingvallavatn and east of the en echelon group of volcanic systems extending across the Reykjanes Peninsula, that erupted last in the Holocene.

== Geography ==
The lava fields are spread out to the south-east of the older edifice of Búrfell [ˈpurˌfɛtl̥] being bounded to the east by the water body of Álftavatn [ˈaul̥taˌvahtn̥], on the river Sog (Sogið) and reaches to the south the confluence of the Sog with the Hvítá. From these river boundaries at about 20 m (66 ft) the field reaches its highest point at the Seyðishólar [ˈseiːðɪsˌhouːlar̥] cone of 214 m (702 ft). Most of the lava fields are covered by birch and willow.

== Geology ==
Tephrochronology approximates the volcano's last eruption as about 7000 years ago. There are at least ten vents and all have erupted olivine tholeiite basalt in effusive eruptions although one small tephra eruption is known. It has been classified as part of the Western Volcanic Zone, but is also part of the South Iceland seismic zone. The northern parts of the lava fields overlay lava fields erupted before the last ice age by the shield volcano Lyngdalsheiði [ˈliŋkˌtalsˌheiːðɪ] to the north. This is known as the maar volcanic crater of Kerið towards the middle of the field has 7–8 m (23–26 ft) of the distinctive Lyngdalsheiði basalt exposed. The maar has a total depth of 55 m (180 ft) with 10 m (33 ft) being water filled.. In a crater row line extending 800 m (2,600 ft) to the south–east from Kerið are the Tjarnarhólar [ˈtʰja(r)tnarˌhouːlar̥] craters. These erupted what was historically called the Tjarnarhólahraun [-ˌhouːlaˌr̥œyːn] lavas, a name not currently used in this context, extending mainly to the south of about 12 km^{2} (4.6 sq mi), now covered by up to four more recent lava flows in part. This central area of the field also has the vent Rauðhólar to the south–east, that contributed some of the youngest lavas in the area, which is part of the many vent Rauðhólahraun [ˈrœyðˌhouːlaˌr̥œyːn] flow, although true young Rauðhólar [-ˌhouːlar̥] lava flows (Svönkuhraun [ˈsvœyŋkʏˌr̥œyːn]), that erupted more recently that 7050 BP, at a volume of 0.009 km^{3} (0.0022 cu mi) are much smaller. To the east of the Rauðhólar vent are the also young Kolgrafarhóll [ˈkʰɔlˌkraːvarˌhoutl̥] and Borgarhóll [ˈpɔrkarˌhoutl̥] vents and east of that the Selhóll I (Selhóll south) [ˈsɛlˌhoutl̥] vent that is one of oldest vents and erupted 0.01 km^{3} (0.0024 cu mi) more than 9500 years BP (cal). Kolgrafarhóll had a small eruption at 0.004 km^{3} (0.00096 cu mi) more recent than 7050 years BP (cal) and so did Borgarhóll 0.001 km^{3} (0.00024 cu mi). To the south of Selhóll I is the most southern vent of the field Álftarhóll [ˈaul̥tarˌhoutl̥] (Álftarhólar [-ˌhouːlar]) that produced the larger 6.2 km^{2} (2.4 sq mi) (0.126 km^{3} (0.030 cu mi)) Álftarhólshraun [-ˌhoulsˌr̥œyːn] flow, that is less than 7050 years BP (cal).

The most eastern vent and its Borgarhólar lava field (Borgarhólahraun [ˈpɔrkarˌhouːlaˌr̥œyːn]) is separate from the rest of the Grímsnes lava fields with a small eruptive volume of 0.03 km^{3} (0.0072 cu mi) and dated to 8200 years BP (cal).

The largest lava field to the north and east of Kerið is the 23.5 km^{2} (9.1 sq mi) Seyðishólar-Kerhólahraun [ˈcʰɛrˌhouːlaˌr̥œyːn] field. Its vents are Seyðishólar that produced a volume of 0.26 km^{3} (0.062 cu mi) dated accurately by tephrochronology to 9500 years BP (cal) and Kerhóll that produced a volume of 0.36 km^{3} (0.086 cu mi) also dated well to 7050 years BP (cal). The Kálfshólar [ˈkʰaul(f)sˌhouːlar̥] vent just to the east of Seyðishólar and Kerhóll [-ˈhoutl̥] produced the Kálfshólahraun [-ˌhouːlaˌr̥œyːn] field that flowed to the east to the Sog within area of 8.0 km^{2} (3.1 sq mi) (0.14 km^{3} (0.034 cu mi)) and is more recent than 7050 years BP (cal).. The most northerly vent to the north of Kálfshólar is old at 9500 years BP (cal) or more and called Selhóll-north (Selhóll II) with a lava erupted volume of 0.04 km^{3} (0.0096 cu mi). To the east of this is Rauðhóll [ˈrœyðˌhoutl̥] (Kerlingarhóll [ˈcʰe(r)tliŋkarˌfjœtl̥]) lava field (Rauðhólshraun [-ˌhoulsˌr̥œyːn]) dated earlier than 7050 BP (cal).

The total volume of lava produced in the lava flows of Grímsnes has been estimated at 1.2 cubic kilometres (0.29 cu mi).

== See also ==
- Geography of Iceland
- List of lakes of Iceland
- Volcanism of Iceland
  - List of volcanic eruptions in Iceland
  - List of volcanoes in Iceland
