= Straumsvík =

Harbour on the Reykjanes Peninsula in Iceland

Coordinates: 64.045°N 22.043°W

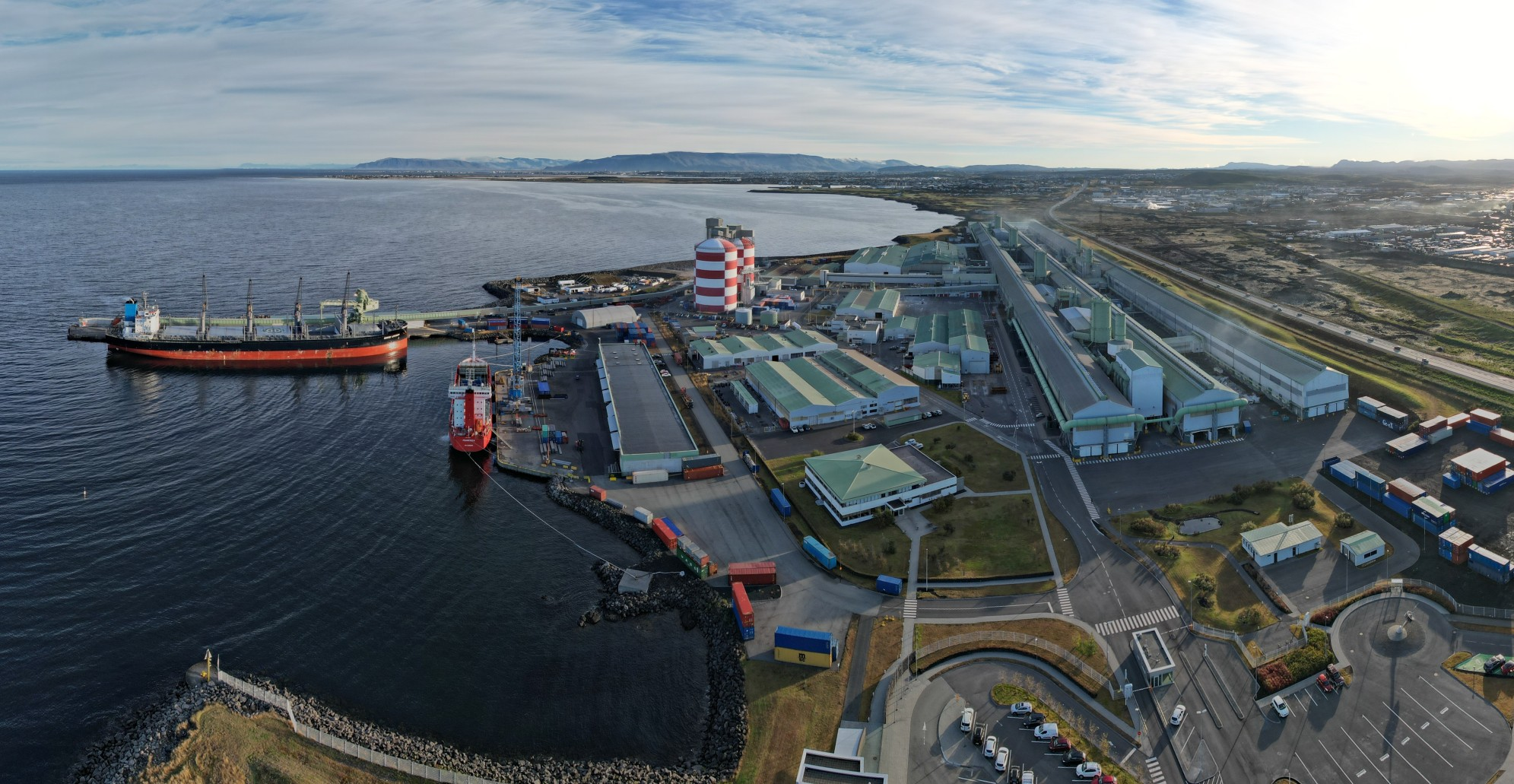
Straumsvík in 2022

Straumsvík (Icelandic pronunciation: [ˈstrœymsˌviːk], "stream cove") is a harbour on the northern shore of the Reykjanes Peninsula in Iceland.
