= Þjóðveldisbærinn Stöng =

Reconstructed viking-era farmstead in Iceland

Coordinates: 64°7′12″N 19°49′13″W

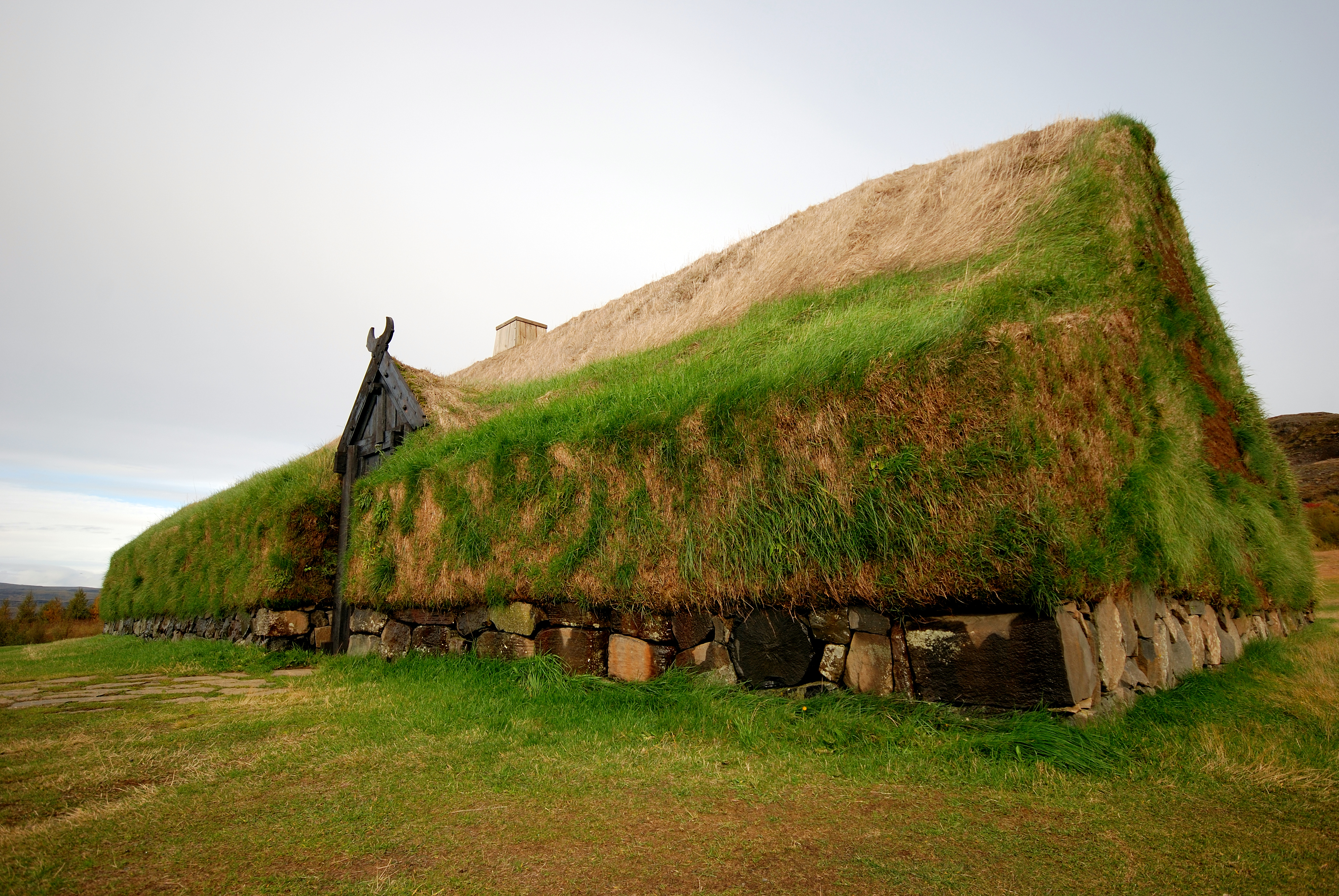
Replica longhouse at Þjóðveldisbærinn

Þjóðveldisbærinn Stöng (Icelandic: [ˈθjouðˌvɛltɪsˌpaiːrɪn ˈstœyŋk], Stöng Commonwealth Farm) is a reconstructed viking-era farmstead in Iceland, located in the Þjórsárdalur valley near road 32 in Árnessýsla county. It includes a historically accurate reconstruction of buildings, including a longhouse, which stood 7 km to the north at Stöng; the farm is believed to have been buried under volcanic ash in 1104 following the eruption of the volcano Hekla. The reconstructed buildings are open in the summer and house an exhibit of medieval Icelandic handicrafts and technology.

The reconstruction of the three buildings that once stood at Stöng was begun in 1974 as part of the national celebrations of the 1100th anniversary of the settlement of Iceland in 874, and completed in 1977. It was overseen by Hörður Ágústsson, an expert in medieval Icelandic architecture.

A church on the model of early Icelandic churches, including one excavated at Stöng in the 1980s and 1990s, was added to celebrate the 1000th anniversary of the christianisation of Iceland, and consecrated in 2000.

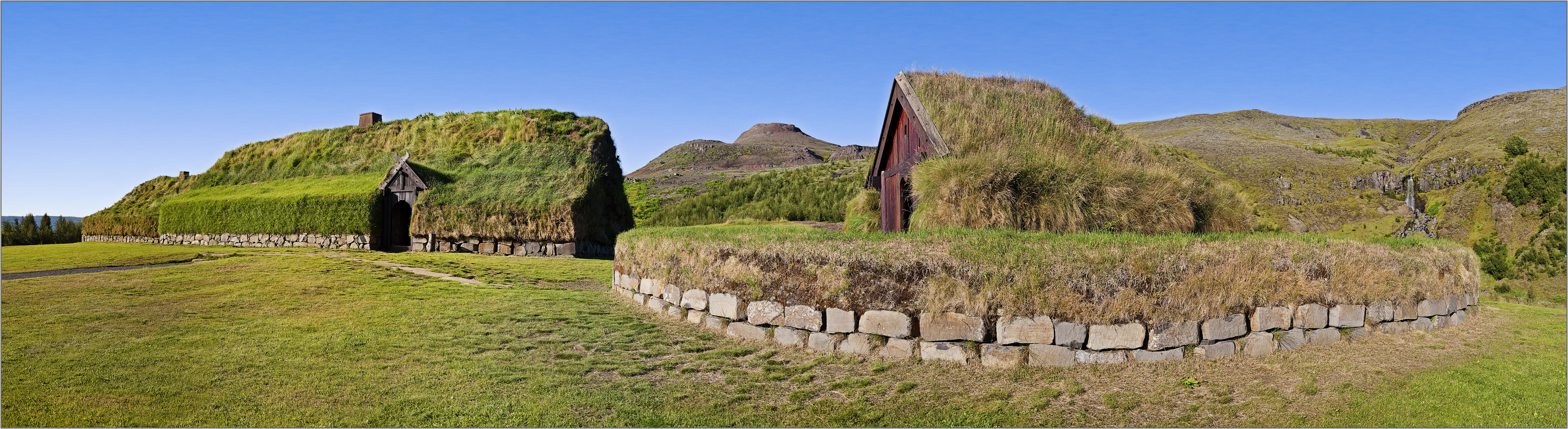
Buildings at Þjóðveldisbærinn; church in foreground
