= Þjórsá =

River in Iceland

Coordinates: 63°46′26″N 20°48′47″W

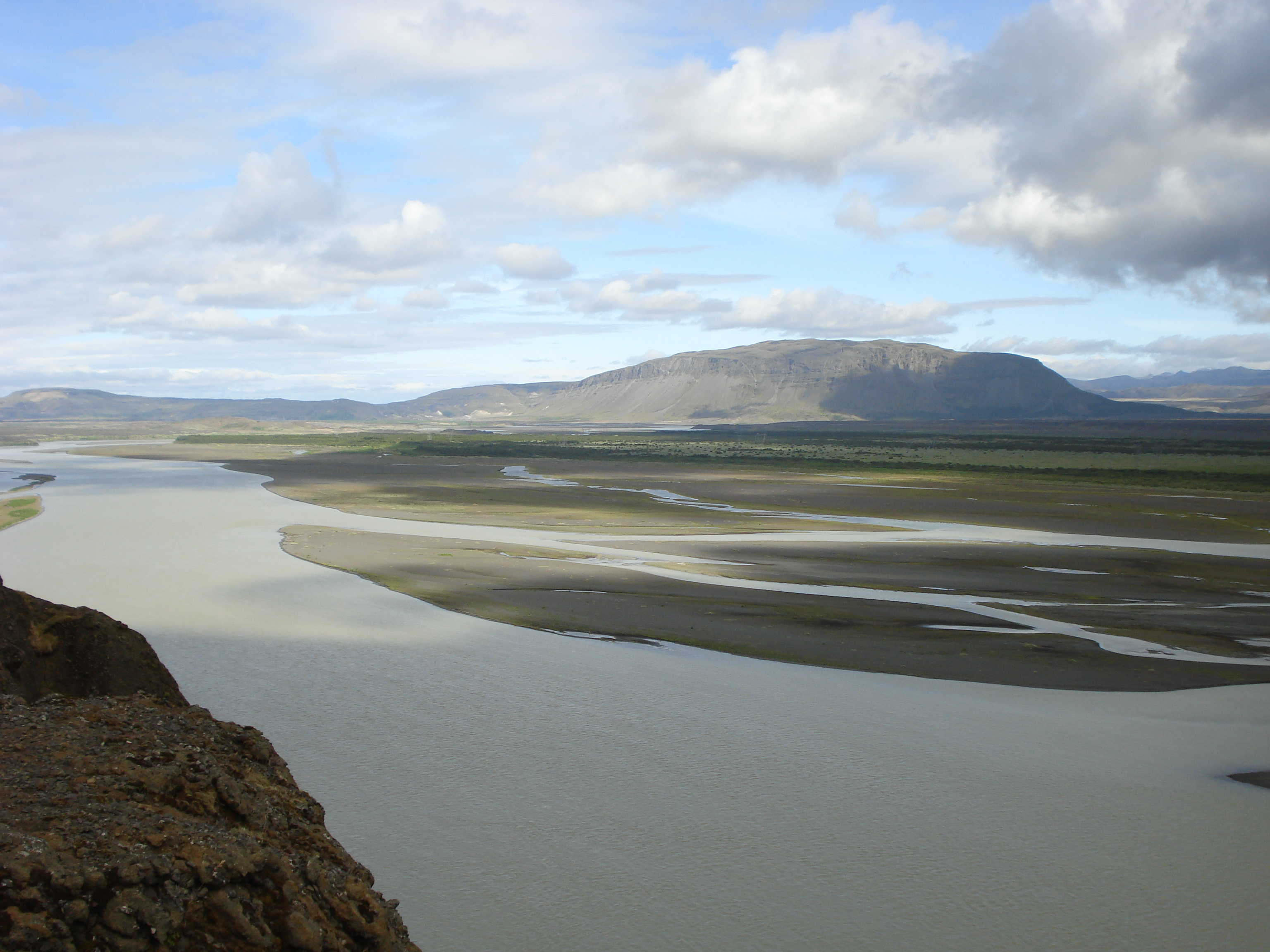

Location
- Countries: Iceland

Physical characteristics
- Length: 230 kilometres (140 mi)

Designations

Ramsar Wetland
- Official name: Thjórsárver
- Designated: 20 March 1990
- Reference no.: 460

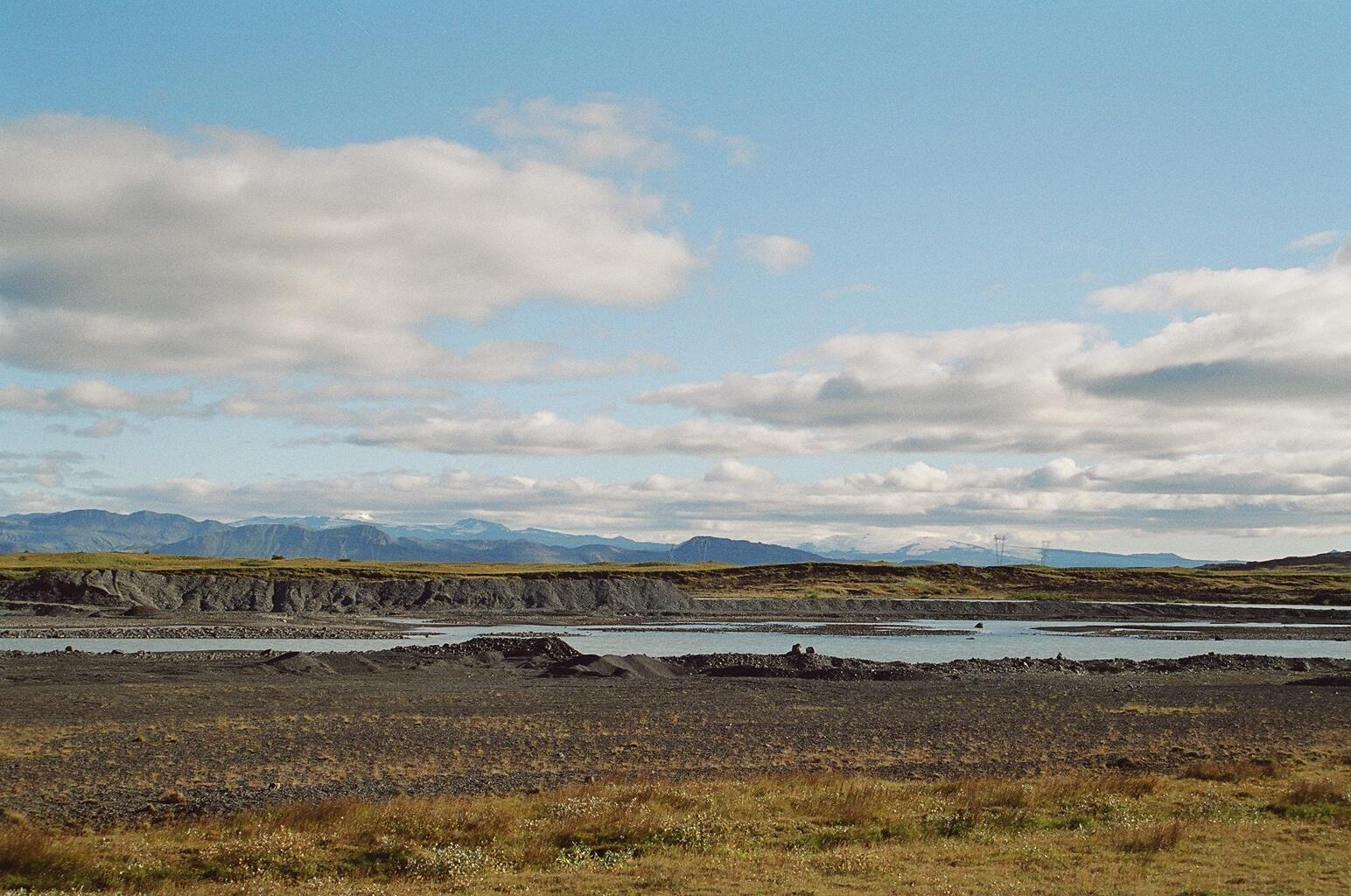
The river Þjórsá with the glaciers Tindfjallajökull and Eyjafjallajökull

Þjórsá (Icelandic pronunciation: [ˈθjour̥sˌauː]) is Iceland's longest river at 230 kilometres (140 mi). It is in the south of the island.

Þjórsá is a glacier river and has its source on the glacier Hofsjökull. It flows out through narrow gorges in the highlands of Iceland. Further downstream, another river, the Tungnaá, flows into it (see also Háifoss), before it enters the lowlands. There it passes the valley of Þjórsárdalur (Thjorsardalur) where the historical farm of Stöng is located. In the lowlands it flows along the eastern border of the Great Þjórsá Lava.

In the middle of the now rather wide river, there is a big island called Árnes [ˈaurˌnɛːs], where there used to be a Þing. The administrative unit of Árnessýsla was named after it.

The hringvegur (Road No. 1) traverses the river via a bridge between Selfoss and Hella. Some distance to the southwest the river flows into the Atlantic Ocean.

'Á' signifies river while 'þjór' means bull and is cognate to Danish - tyr, Swedish - tjur and Latin - taurus. According to the Book of Settlement, the river was named after the bovine prow statue of one of the first settlement ships.

== See also ==
- List of rivers of Iceland
