= SS Hecla =

SS Hecla may refer to the following ships:

- SS Hecla (1871), a Dutch cargo ship lost in 1885
- SS Hecla (1944), a Liberty ship built for the UK, but taken over by the United States Navy as USS Xanthus (AR-19)

== See also ==
- HMS Hecla
