= Hekla =

Stratovolcano in South of Iceland

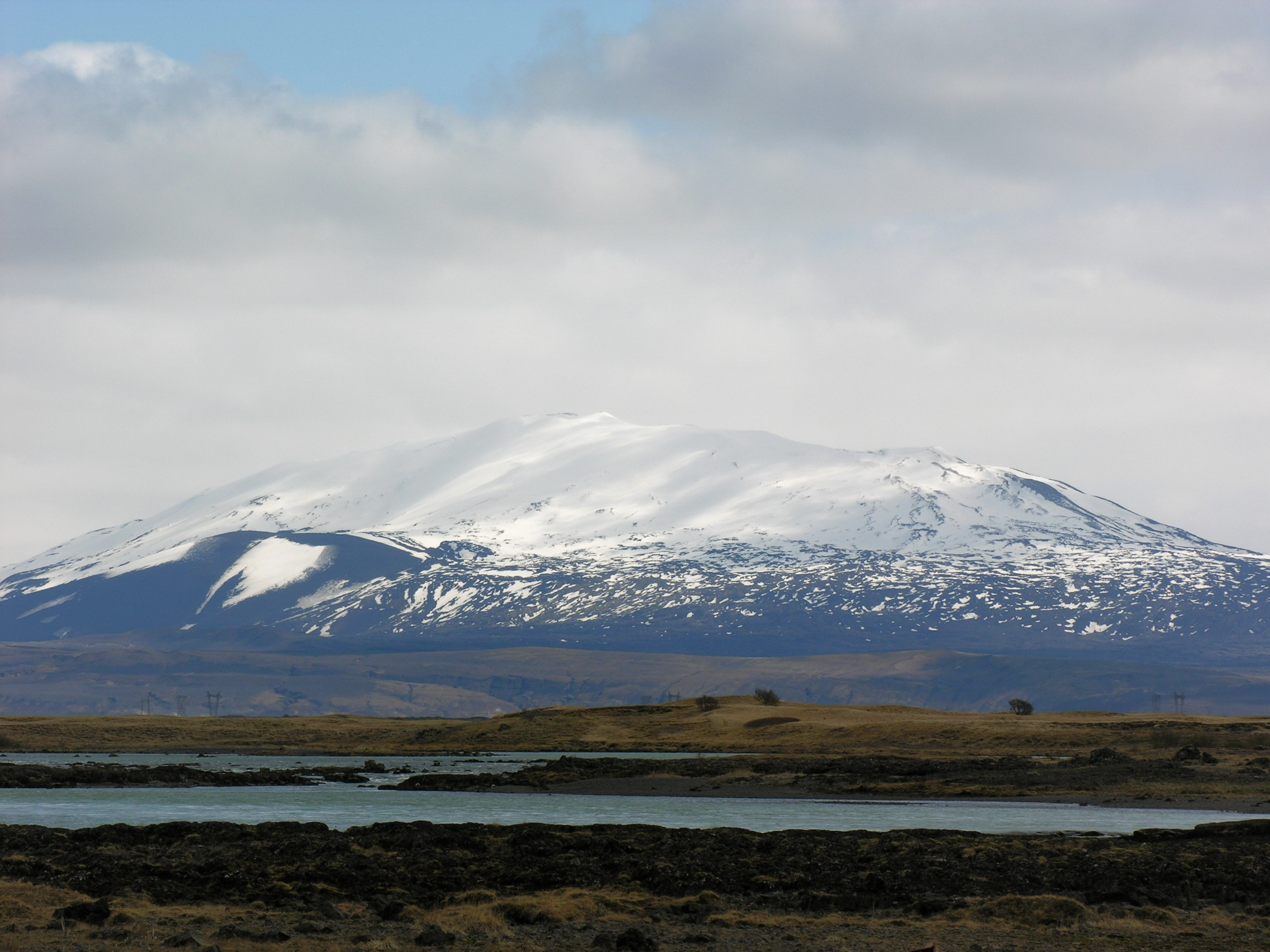
- Hekla and Þjórsá

Highest point
- Elevation: 1,488 m (4,882 ft)
- Coordinates: 63°59′32″N 19°39′57″W

Naming
- English translation: Hooded
- Language of name: Icelandic

Geography
- Location within Iceland
- Selected geological features near Hekla (red outline) and its assigned lavas (light violet). Legend: Other shading shows: calderas; central volcanoes; fissure swarms; subglacial terrain above 1,100 m (3,600 ft); seismically active areas; Clicking on the rectangle in the image enlarges to full window and enables mouse-over with more detail.
- Location: Iceland

Geology
- Mountain type: Active fissure stratovolcano
- Last eruption: February to March 2000

Climbing
- First ascent: Eggert Ólafsson, Bjarni Pálsson, 20 June 1750

Hekla (Icelandic pronunciation: [ˈhɛhkla]), or Hecla, is an active stratovolcano in the south of Iceland with a height of 1,491 m (4,892 ft). Hekla is one of Iceland's most active volcanoes; over 20 eruptions have occurred in and around the volcano since the year 1210. During the Middle Ages, the Icelandic Norse called the volcano the "Gateway to Hell" and the idea spread over much of Europe.

The volcano's frequent large and often initially explosive eruptions have covered much of Iceland with tephra, and these layers can be used to date eruptions of Iceland's other volcanoes. Approximately 10% of the tephra created in Iceland in the last thousand years has come from Hekla, amounting to 5 km^{3} (1.2 cu mi). Cumulatively, the volcano has produced one of the largest volumes of lava of any in the world in the last millennium, around 8 km^{3} (1.9 cu mi).

== Etymology ==
In Icelandic Hekla is the word for a short hooded cloak, which may relate to the frequent cloud cover on the summit. An early Latin source refers to the mountain as Mons Casule.

== Reputation ==
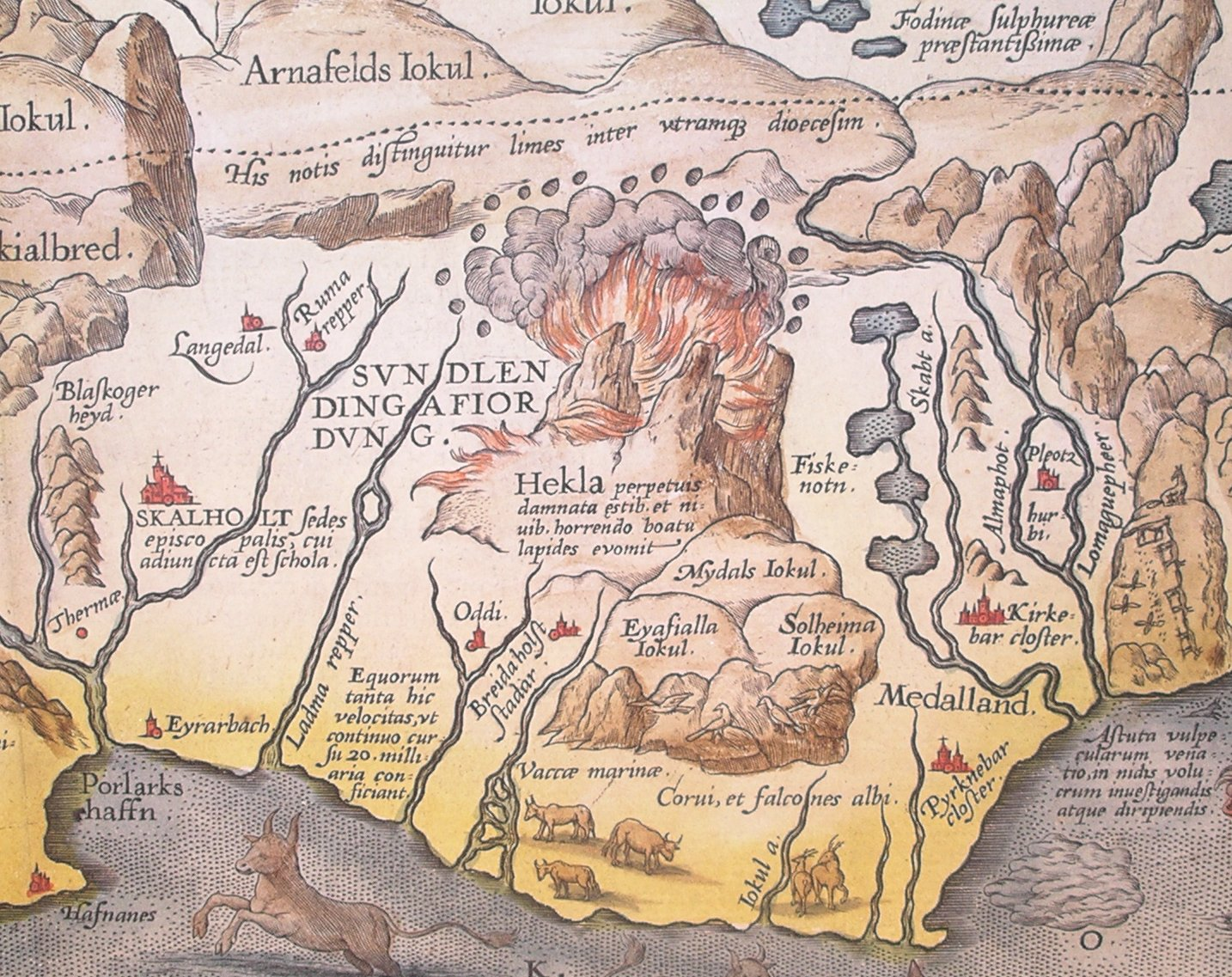
Detail of Abraham Ortelius' 1585 map of Iceland showing Hekla in eruption. The Latin text translates as "The Hekla, perpetually condemned to storms and snow, vomits stones under terrible noise".

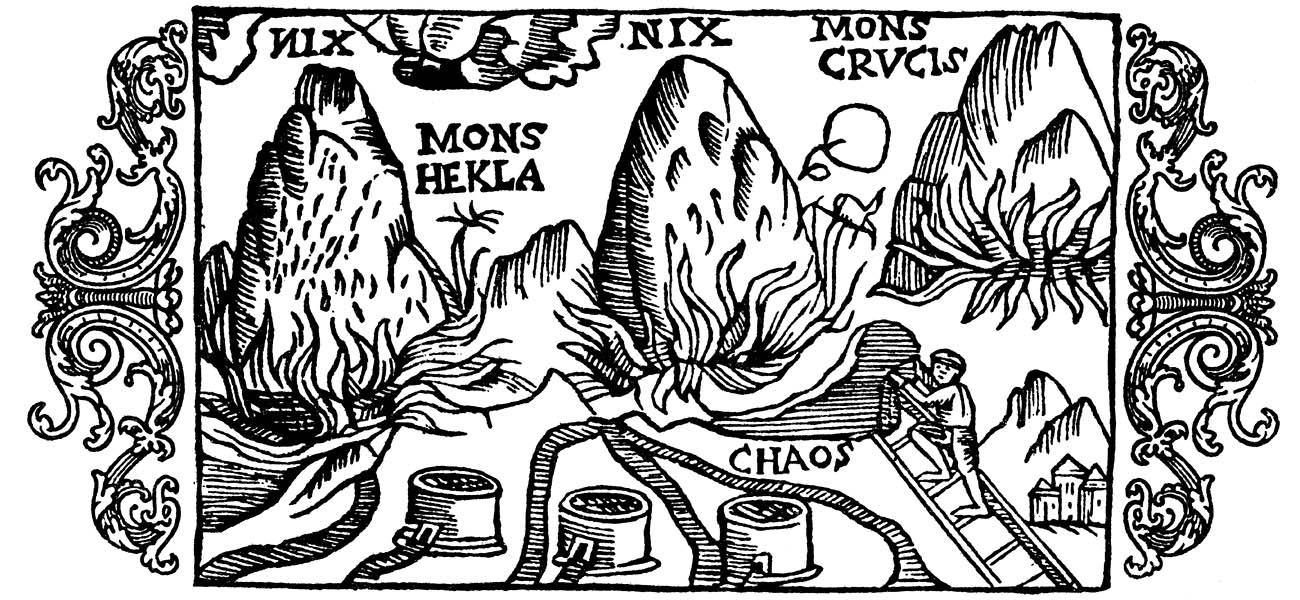
Illustration from Olaus Magnus's Historia de gentibus septentrionalibus, book 2, 1555

After the eruption of 1104, stories, probably spread deliberately through Europe by Cistercian monks, told that Hekla was the gateway to Hell. The Cistercian monk Herbert of Clairvaux wrote in his De Miraculis (without naming Hekla):

The renowned fiery cauldron of Sicily, which men call Hell's chimney ... that cauldron is affirmed to be like a small furnace compared to this enormous inferno.

— Herbert of Clairvaux, Liber De Miraculis, 1180

A poem by the monk Benedeit from c. 1120 about the voyages of Saint Brendan mentions Hekla as the prison of Judas.

In the Flatey Book Annal it was recorded that during the 1341 eruption, people saw large and small birds flying in the mountain's fire which were taken to be souls. In the 16th century Caspar Peucer wrote that the Gates of Hell could be found in "the bottomless abyss of Hekla Fell". The belief that Hekla was the gate to Hell persisted until the 19th century. There is still a legend that witches gather on Hekla during Easter.

== Geography ==
Hekla is part of a volcanic ridge, 40 km (25 mi) long. The most active part of this ridge, a fissure about 5.5 km (3.4 mi) long named Heklugjá [ˈhɛhklʏˌcauː], is considered to be within Hekla proper. Hekla looks rather like an overturned boat, with its keel being a series of craters, two of which are generally the most active.

== Geology ==
A map of the volcanic systems of Iceland

Hekla has a morphological type between that of a fissure vent and stratovolcano (built from mixed lava and tephra eruptions) sited at a rift-transform junction in the area where the south Iceland seismic zone and eastern volcanic zone meet. The unusual form of Hekla is found on very few volcanoes around the world, notably Callaqui in Chile. The 5.5 km (3.4 mi) Heklugjá fissure opens along its entire length during major eruptions and is fed by a magma reservoir estimated to have a top 4 km (2.5 mi) below the surface with centroid 2.5 km (1.6 mi) lower. The chamber extends to an unusual depth of more than 10 km (6.2 mi), and the more silicic lavas have matured at more than 9 km (5.6 mi).

Many of the eruptions commence with thicker more explosive rhyolite, dacite or andesite eruptives which create tephra and have the potential for pyroclastic flows. Other or the later part of eruptions come from thinner basalt tending magma which forms lava fields.

The tephra produced by its eruptions is high in fluorine, which is poisonous to animals. Hekla's basaltic andesite lava generally has a SiO_{2} content of over 54%, compared to the 45–50% of other nearby transitional alkaline basalt eruptions (see TAS classification). It is the only Icelandic volcano to produce calc-alkaline lavas. Phenocrysts in Hekla's lava can contain plagioclase, pyroxene, titanomagnetite, olivine, and apatite.

When not erupting Hekla is often covered with snow and small glaciers; it is also unusually aseismic with activity only starting 30–80 minutes before an eruption. Hekla is located on the mid-ocean ridge, a diverging plate boundary. Hekla is closely studied today for parameters such as strain, tilt, deformation and other movement and seismic activity. Earthquakes in the volcano's vicinity are generally below magnitude 2 while it is dormant and magnitude 3 when erupting.

== Eruption history ==
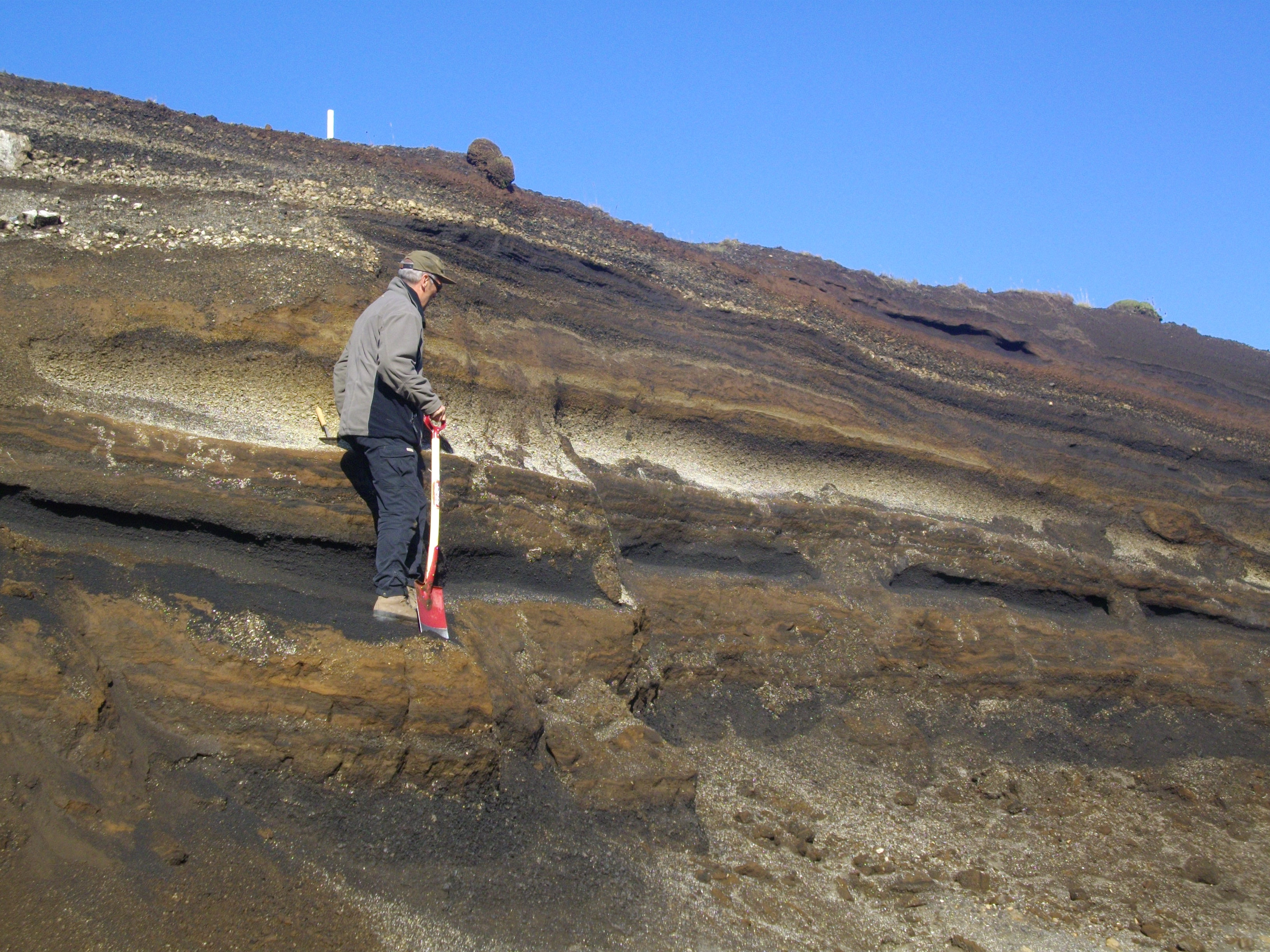
Tephra horizons in south-central Iceland. The thick and light coloured layer at center of the photo is rhyolitic tephra from Hekla.

The earliest recorded eruption of Hekla took place in 1104. Since then there have been between twenty and thirty considerable eruptions, with the mountain sometimes remaining active for periods of six years with little pause. Eruptions in Hekla are varied and difficult to predict. Precursor seismic activity may only be for a couple of hours or less. Some are very short (a week to ten days) whereas others can stretch into months and years (the 1947 eruption started 29 March 1947 and ended April 1948). But there is a general correlation: the longer Hekla goes dormant, the larger and more catastrophic its opening eruption will be. The most recent eruption was on 26 February 2000.

=== Prehistoric eruptions ===
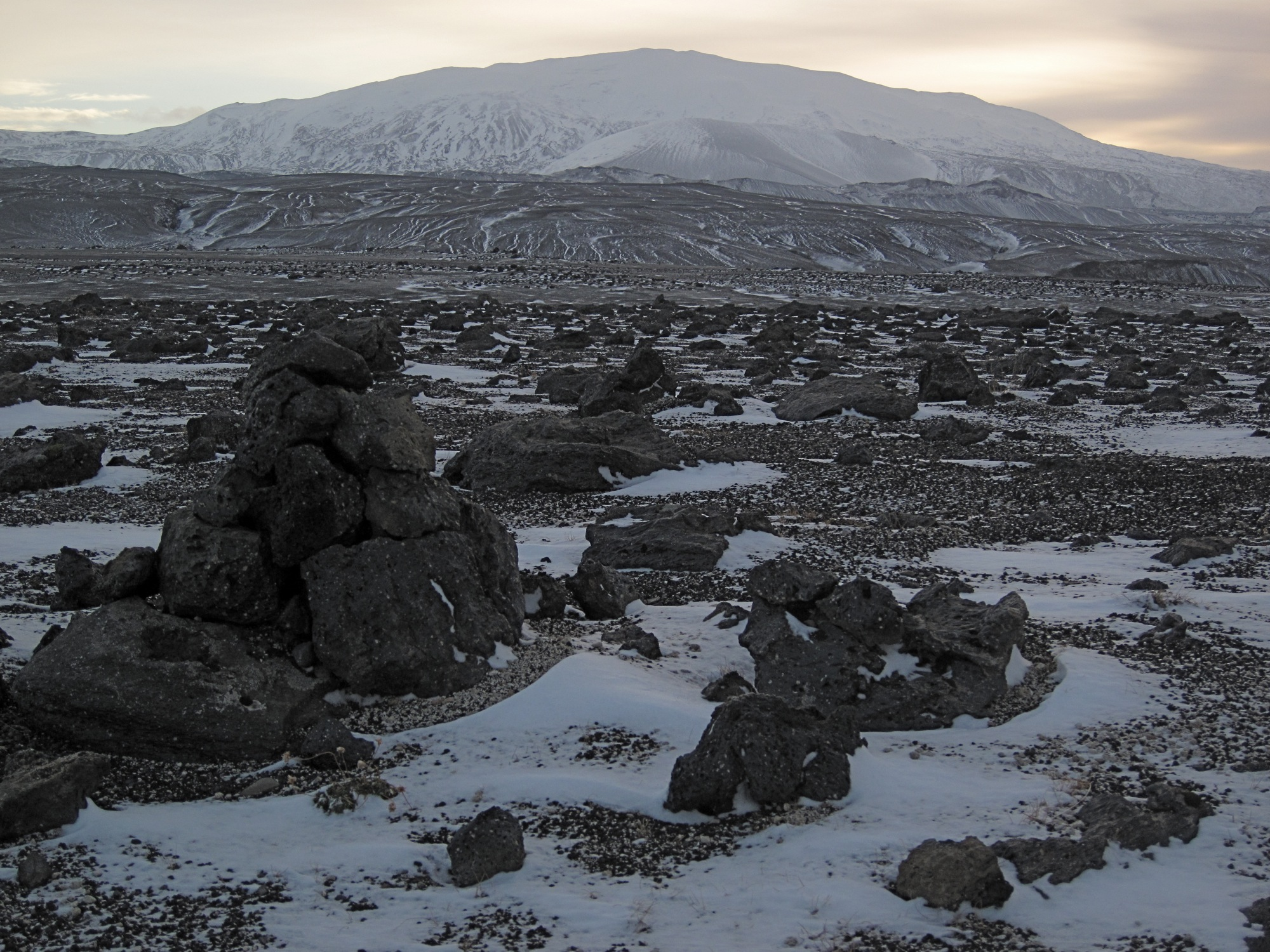
Hekla beyond a snowy field of volcanic ash

One of the largest Holocene eruptions in Iceland was the Hekla 3 (or H_{3}) eruption c. 1000 BC, which threw about 7.3 km^{3} (1.8 cu mi) of volcanic rock into the atmosphere, placing its Volcanic Explosivity Index (VEI) at 5. This would have cooled temperatures in the northern parts of the globe for a few years afterwards. Traces of this eruption have been identified in Scottish peat bogs, and in Ireland a study of tree rings dating from this period has shown negligible tree ring growth for a decade. The dates were recently recalibrated of the major eruptions and a table is given below as the difference in dates could cause confusion.

Dates of major eruptions in prehistoric times:^{[A]}
Eruption	Year (2019 values)	Year (2024 values)
H-5	5050 BCE	5103 ± 260 BCE
H-Sv	3900 BCE	3900 BCE
H-4	2310 ± 20 BCE	2375 ± 8 BCE
H-3	950 BCE	1063 ± 140 BCE

^{A} Unless otherwise stated eruption dates in Year (2019 values) column are from Global Volcanism Program and Catalogue of Icelandic Volcanoes, As other sources can disagree, there has been a recent literature update. The values and range given in the Year (2024 values) column used IntCal20 for H-5 and H-3 and ice core data for H-4 which were not available in 2019.

Hekla 3, 4, and 5 produced huge amounts of rhyolitic ash and tephra, covering 80% of Iceland and providing useful date markers in soil profiles in other parts of Europe such as Orkney, Scandinavia, and elsewhere. H_{3} and H_{4} produced the largest layers of tephra in Iceland since the last ice age. During the last 7,000 years, one third of the volcanic ash deposited in Scandinavia, Germany, Ireland, and the United Kingdom originated from Hekla.

=== 1104 to 1878 ===
1104 (H1)

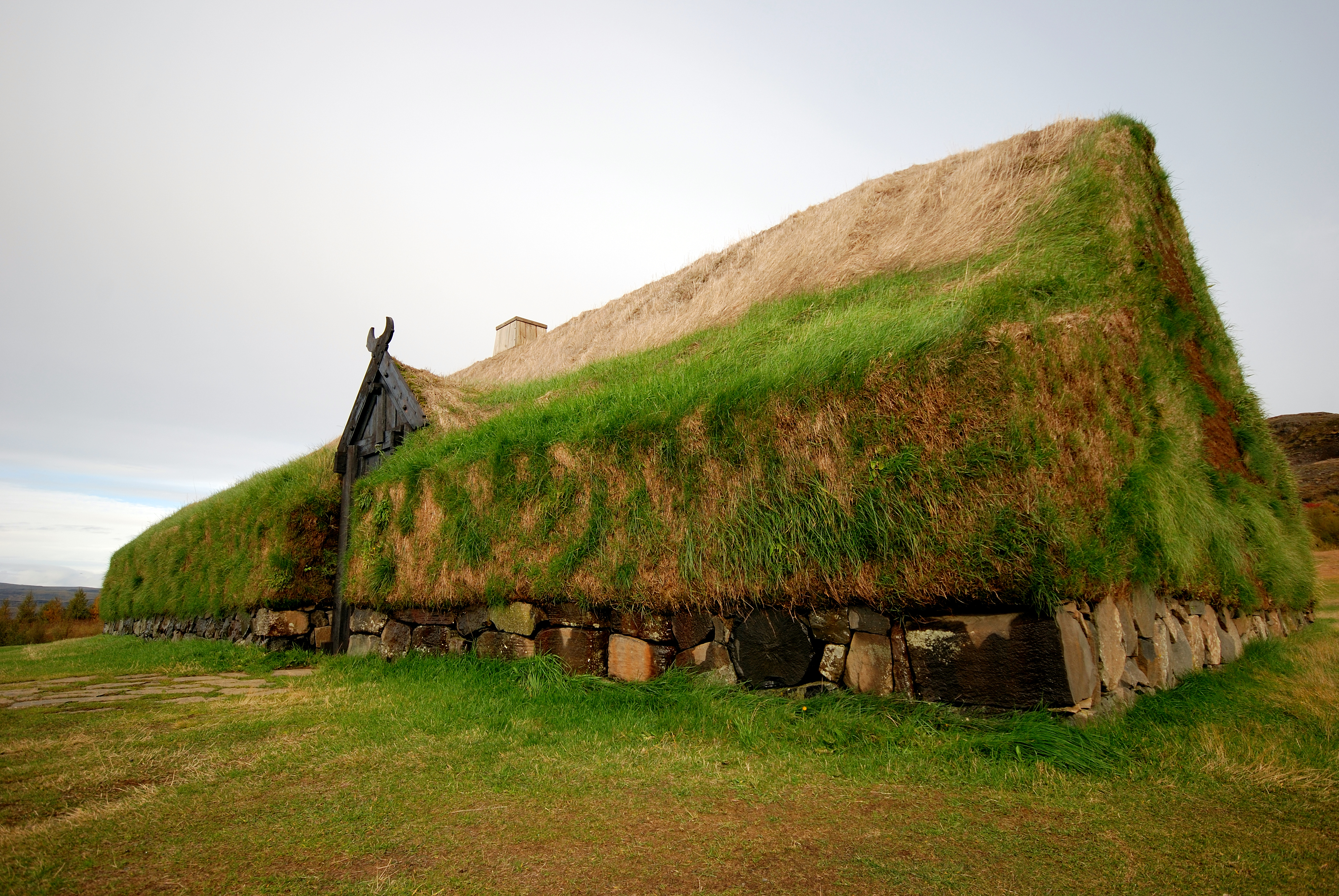
Main building of the replica of Stöng, which was buried under volcanic ash from the 1104 eruption

Hekla had been dormant for at least 250 years when it erupted explosively in 1104 (probably in the autumn), covering 55,000 km^{2} (21,000 sq mi) which is over half of Iceland with 1.2 km^{3} / 2.5 km^{3} of rhyodacitic tephra. This was the second largest tephra eruption in the country in historical times with a VEI of 5. Farms upwind of the volcano 15 km (9.3 mi) in Þjórsárdalur valley, 50 km (31 mi) at Hrunamannaafréttur and 70 km (43 mi) at Lake Hvítárvatn were abandoned because of the damage. The eruption caused Hekla to become famous throughout Europe.

1158

A VEI-4 eruption began on 19 January 1158 producing over 0.15 km^{3} (0.036 cu mi) of lava and 0.2 km^{3} (0.048 cu mi) of tephra. It is likely to be the source of the Efrahvolshraun lava on Hekla's west.

1206

The VEI-3 eruption began on 4 December.

1222

The VEI-2 eruption and the 1206 eruption distributed around 0.24 km^{3} (0.058 cu mi) of tephra mainly to the northeast.

1300–1301

Aerial view of Hekla in 2026

This VEI-4 eruption, which started on 11 July and lasted for a year, was the second largest tephra eruption of Hekla since Iceland was settled, covering 30,000 km^{2} (12,000 sq mi) of land with 0.31 km^{3} (0.074 cu mi) of tephra. Over 0.5 km^{3} (0.12 cu mi) of lava was also expelled. The tephra caused significant damage to the settlements of Skagafjörður and Fljót, leading to over 500 deaths that winter. The material output from this eruption had SiO_{2} levels of between 56% and 64%, and apart from a slight abundance of olivine the lava, was typical of Hekla eruptions.

1341

A small eruption (VEI-3) started on 19 May and deposited around 5×10^{7} km^{3} (1.2×10^{7} cu mi) of tephra over the areas west and southwest of Hekla, leading to many cattle deaths, probably mainly from fluorosis.

1389

In late 1389 Hekla erupted again (VEI-3), starting with a large ejection of tephra to the southeast. Later "the eruption fissure moved itself out of the mountain proper and into the woods a little above Skard". Skard and another nearby farm were destroyed by a large lava flow that now forms the 12.5 km^{2} (4.8 sq mi) Nordurhraun. In total around 0.3 km^{3} (0.072 cu mi) of lava and 5×10^{7} m^{3} (1.8×10^{9} cu ft) of tephra were produced.

1440

An eruption may have occurred around 1440 at Raudölder; despite being close to Hekla this is not classed as an eruption of Hekla based on the SiO_{2} content of the lava.

1510

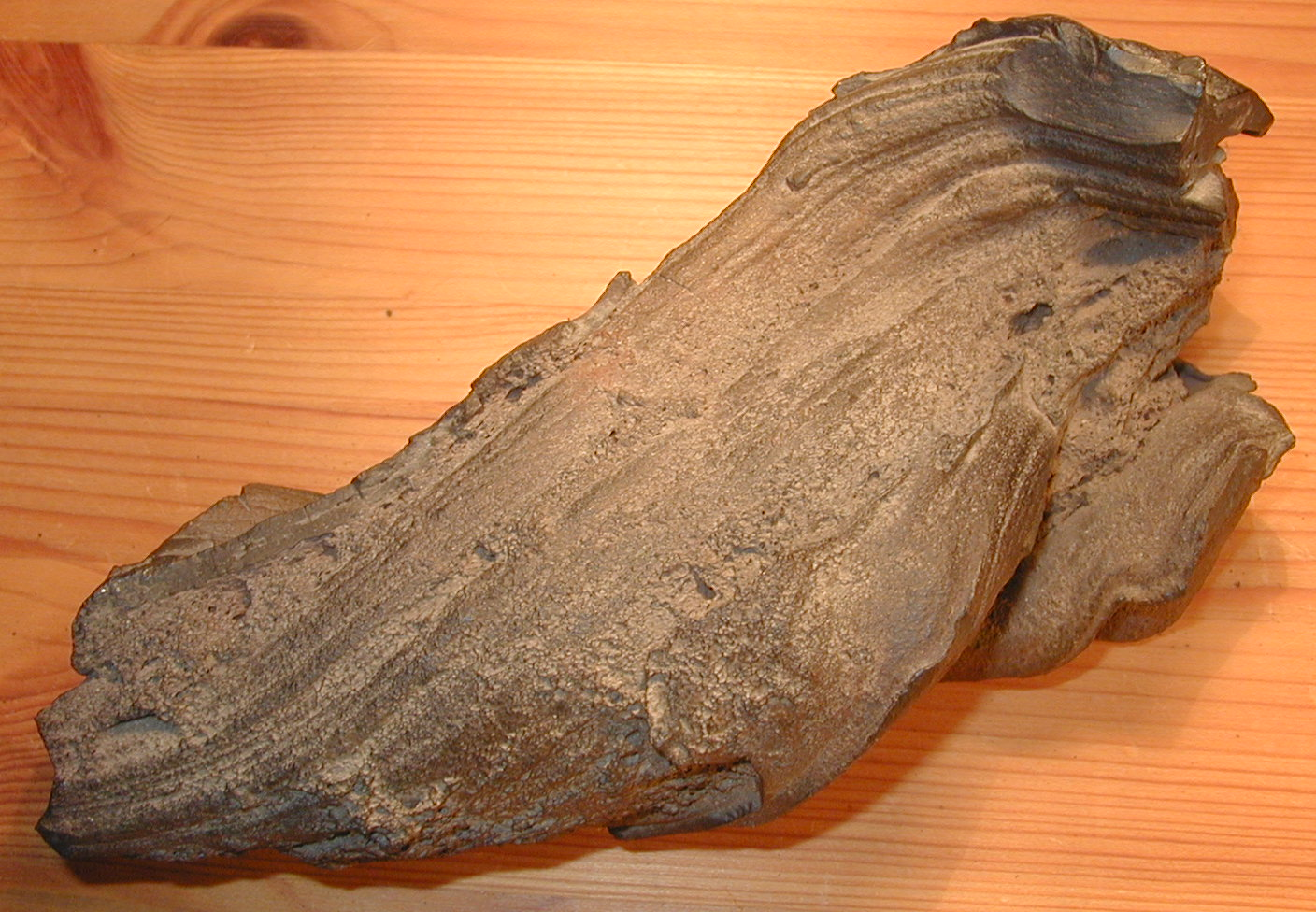
17 cm long volcanic bomb found in the lava-fields of Hekla

Details of the 1510 eruption were not recorded until a century later. It started on 25 July and was particularly violent (VEI 4), firing volcanic bombs as far as Vördufell, 40 km (25 mi) west. Tephra was deposited over Rangárvellir, Holt and Landeyjar, 0.2 km^{3} (0.048 cu mi) in total. A man in Landsveit was killed.

1597

A VEI-4 eruption began on 3 January and lasted for over 6 months, with 0.15 km^{3} (0.036 cu mi) of tephra being deposited to the south-southeast, damaging Mýrdalur.

1636–1637

A small (VEI-3) eruption began on 8 May 1636 and lasted for over a year. The 5×10^{7} m^{3} (1.8×10^{9} cu ft) of tephra from the eruption damaged pasture to the northeast causing death of livestock.

1693

Starting 13 February and lasting for over 7 months the eruption was one of Hekla's most destructive (VEI-4). Initially tephra was produced at 60,000 m^{3}·s^{−1}, 0.18 km^{3} (0.043 cu mi) during the entire eruption, which also caused lahars and tsunami. The tephra was deposited to the northwest, destroying and damaging farms and woodland in Þjórsárdalur, Land, Hreppar and Biskupstungur. Fine ash from the eruption reached Norway. There was damage to wildlife with significant numbers of trout, salmon, ptarmigan and farm animals dying.

1725

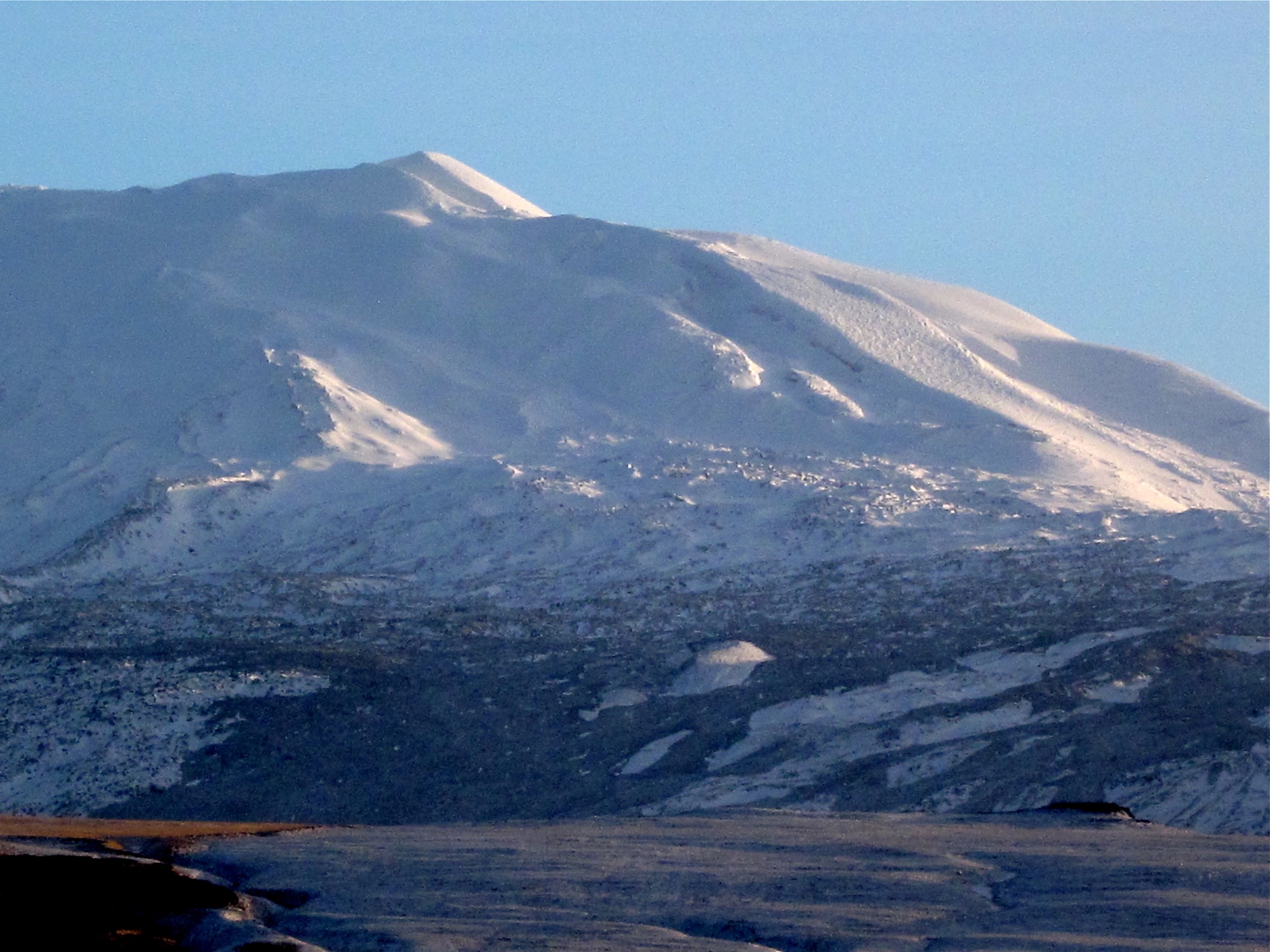
The flanks of Hekla

A very small eruption, possibly only VEI-1, took place on 2 April 1725, producing flows of lava from locations around Hekla which have since been covered by later lava flows. These eruptions are not classed as of Hekla itself based on the SiO_{2} content of the lava.

1766–1768

The eruption of 1766 was large (VEI-4) and produced the second largest lava flow, 1.3 km^{3} (0.31 cu mi) covering 65 km^{2} (25 sq mi), and third largest tephra volume, 0.24 km^{3} (0.058 cu mi), of any Icelandic volcano during the inhabited era. The eruption started at around 3:30 am on 5 April 1766 and ceased in May 1768. Initially a 2–4 cm layer of tephra was deposited over Austur-Húnavatnssýsla and Skagafjördur, resulting in the deaths of both fish and livestock. Rangárvellir, Land and Hreppar also suffered damage. During the eruption up to 0.5 m (1 ft 8 in) lava bombs were thrown 15–20 km (9.3–12.4 mi) away, and flooding was caused by the sudden melting of snow and ice on Hekla's slopes.

1845–1846

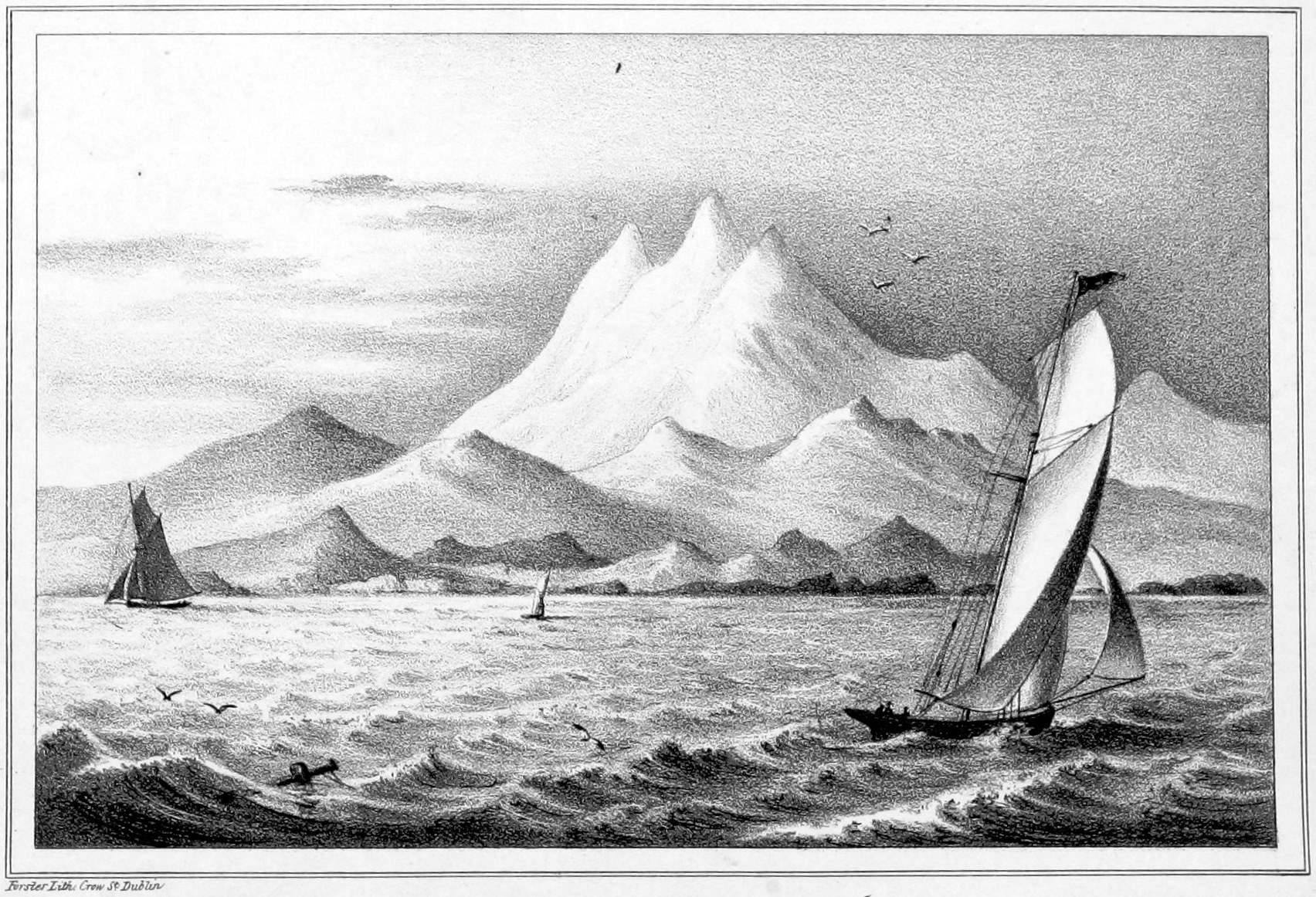
Hekla c. 1851

Hekla was dormant for more than sixty years before 1845, when it suddenly burst forth on 2 September at 9 am:

After a violent storm on the night of the 2nd of September in that year, the surface of the ground in the Orkney Islands was found strown with volcanic dust. There was thus conveyed to the inhabitants of Great Britain an intimation that Hecla had been again at work. Accordingly, tidings soon after arrived of a great eruption of the mountain. On the night of 1 September, the dwellers in its neighbourhood were terrified by a fearful underground groaning, which continued till mid-day on the 2nd. Then, with a tremendous crash, there were formed in the sides of the cone two large openings, whence there gushed torrents of lava, which flowed down two gorges on the flanks of the mountain. The whole summit was enveloped in clouds of vapour and volcanic dust. The neighbouring rivers became so hot as to kill the fish, and the sheep fled in terror from the adjoining heaths, some being burnt before they could escape. On the night of 15 September, two new openings were formed — one on the eastern, and the other on the southern slope — from both of which lava was discharged for twenty-two hours. It flowed to a distance of upwards of twenty miles, killing many cattle and destroying a large tract of pasturage. Twelve miles from the crater, the lava-stream was between forty and fifty feet deep and nearly a mile in width. On 12 October a fresh torrent of lava burst forth, and heaped up another similar mass. The mountain continued in a state of activity up to April 1846; then it rested for a while, and began again in the following month of October. Since then, however, it has enjoyed repose. The effects of these eruptions were disastrous. The whole island was strewn with volcanic ash, which, where it did not smother the grass outright, gave it a poisonous taint. The cattle that ate of it were attacked by a murrain, of which great numbers died. The ice and snow, which had gathered about the mountain for a long period of time, were wholly melted by the heat. Masses of pumice weighing nearly half a ton were thrown to a distance of between four and five miles.

— Anonymous, 1872

The eruption ceased around 5 April 1846. Initially in this VEI-4 eruption tephra was produced at 20,000 m^{3}·s^{−1}. The tephra deposition of a total amount of 0.17 km^{3} (0.041 cu mi) was mainly to the east-southeast; immediately to the east of Hekla the layer was 20–40 cm (7.9–15.7 in) deep. Fine ash was carried to the Faroes, Shetland and Orkney. Lava flows to the west and north-west covered an area of 25 km^{2} (9.7 sq mi) with a volume of 0.63 km^{3} (0.15 cu mi) of lava. Large quantities of dark ash were deposited over pasture in the same directions leading to many livestock deaths through fluorosis for the next two years.

1878

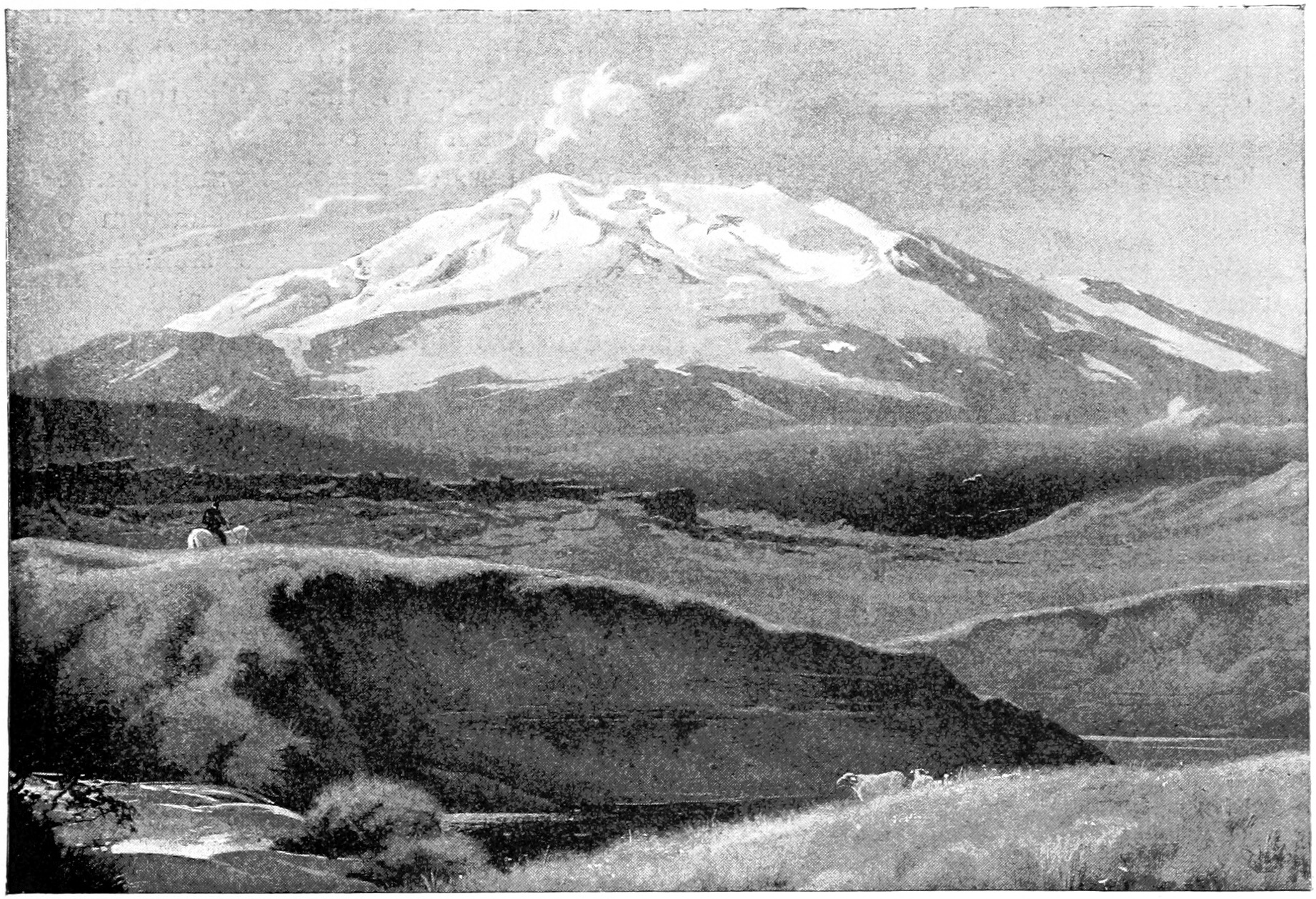
Hekla c. 1893

A small eruption (VEI-2) occurred between 27 February 1878 and April 1878, around 10 km (6.2 mi) east of Hekla, and produced 0.2 km^{3} (0.048 cu mi) of lava from two parallel fissures covering 15.5 km^{2} (6.0 sq mi).

=== 1913 to 1948 ===
1913

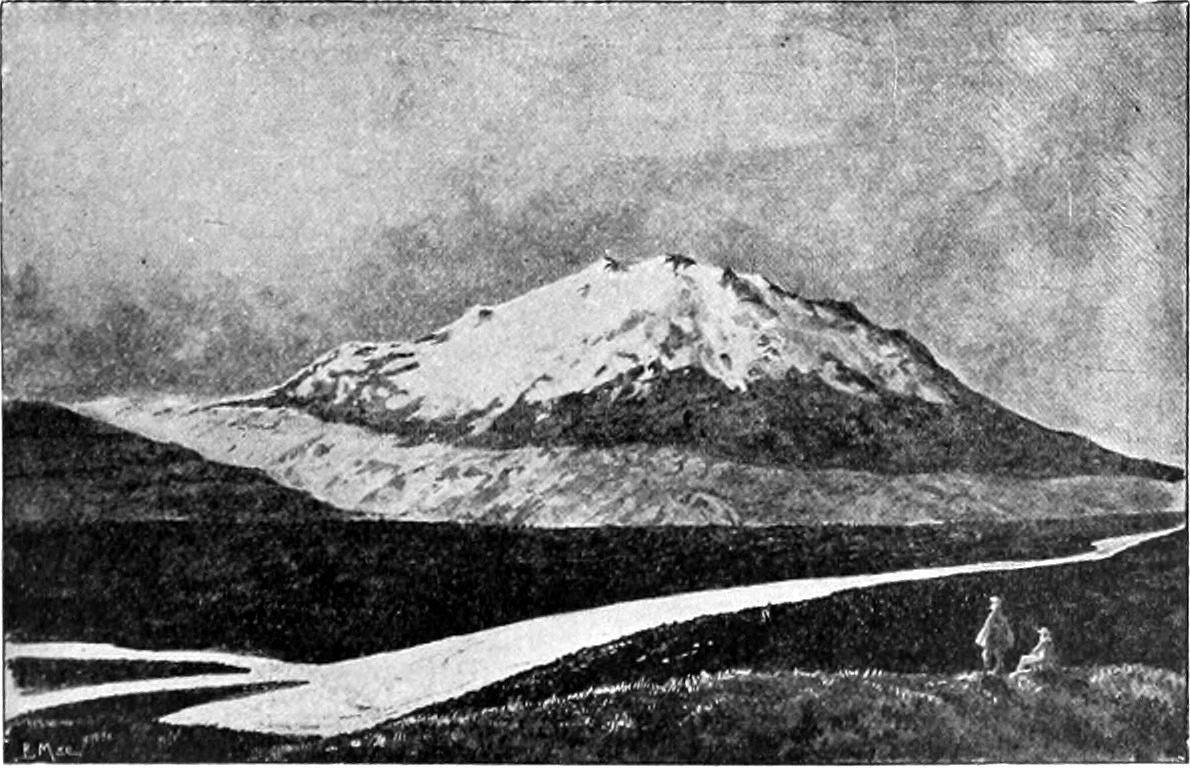
Hekla c. 1904

A small eruption (VEI-2) occurred between 25 April 1913 and 18 May 1913, around 10 km (6.2 mi) east of Hekla, and caused large fissures at Mundafell and Lambafit which produced 3.8 and 6.3 km^{2} (1.5 and 2.4 sq mi) of lava respectively.

1947–1948

The VEI-4 eruption started on 29 March 1947 and ended on 21 April 1948. It is likely that this was both the second greatest lava eruption of Hekla whilst Iceland was inhabited and the second greatest lava eruption in the world in the period 1900–1970. A total lava volume 0.8 km^{3} (0.19 cu mi) was produced with 0.21 km^{3} (0.050 cu mi) of tephra. The height of Hekla was 1,447 m (4,747 ft) before the eruption, increasing to a maximum of 1,503 m (4,931 ft), before dropping to 1,491 m (4,892 ft) subsequently.

The eruption occurred over a century after the last eruption of Hekla proper, the longest dormant period since 1104. Before the eruption the volcano had been visible from the surrounding area but nothing remarkable was noticed. The eruption occurred at 6:41 am ± 3 min with a loud roar; later eruptions could be heard throughout Iceland. An earthquake at 6:50 am measured 6 on the Mercalli intensity scale and increased the eruption intensity until it covered a 4 km (2.5 mi) fissure on the ridge. The cloud from the eruption had ascended to a height of 30 km by 7:08 am, the wind then carried it southwards towards Eyjafjallajökull, turning it black. Pumice first landed on Fljótshlíð at around 7:10 am, and tephra and ash continued falling until it formed a 3–10 cm (1.2–3.9 in) layer. A lava bomb that landed 32 km (20 mi) from Hekla was 0.5 m (1 ft 8 in) across and weighed 20 kg (44 lb). Between Vatnafjöll and Hekla, a layer of tephra up to 1 m (3 ft 3 in) thick was deposited, and this included bombs with a diameter larger than 0.5 m (1 ft 8 in). Bombs with surface areas of 50 m^{2} (540 sq ft) were dropped onto the slopes of Hekla, for up to 1 km (0.62 mi). 51 hours after the eruption had started, ash fell on Helsinki, Finland, having covered 2,860 km (1,780 mi) in this time.

The initial tephra production rate in the first 30 minutes of the eruption was 75,000 m^{3}·s^{−1}, dropping to 22,000 m^{3}·s^{−1} for the next half-hour. The initial phase produced 0.18 km^{3} (0.043 cu mi) of tephra, equating to 4.5×10^{7} km^{3} (1.1×10^{7} cu mi) of Dense-rock equivalent, covering 3,130 km^{2} (1,210 sq mi) of land and sea. 98 farms were damaged by the eruption, but only 2 were no longer farmed in 1970. A large volunteer effort was mobilized to clear the tephra – around 1000 man-days by the end of July. The eruption produced around 3 ML (110×10^{3} cu ft) of water (snowmelt and directly from the fissure) which caused flooding of the Ytri Rangá river.

In the first 20 hours of the eruption approximately 3,500 m^{3}·s^{−1} of lava was produced from the fissure, dividing into various branches and covering 12–15 km^{2} (4.6–5.8 sq mi). On the second day, 8 distinct eruption columns were discernible. A crater formed at 860 m (2,820 ft) called the Lava Crater (Hraungígur), producing a constant flow of lava. Another crater named the Shoulder Crater (Axlargígur) produced a column of smoke every 10 seconds together with loud explosions that created visible compression waves in the smoke. By the fourth, fifth, and sixth days, the eruption was greatly diminished, and only the shoulder and summit craters were erupting explosively.

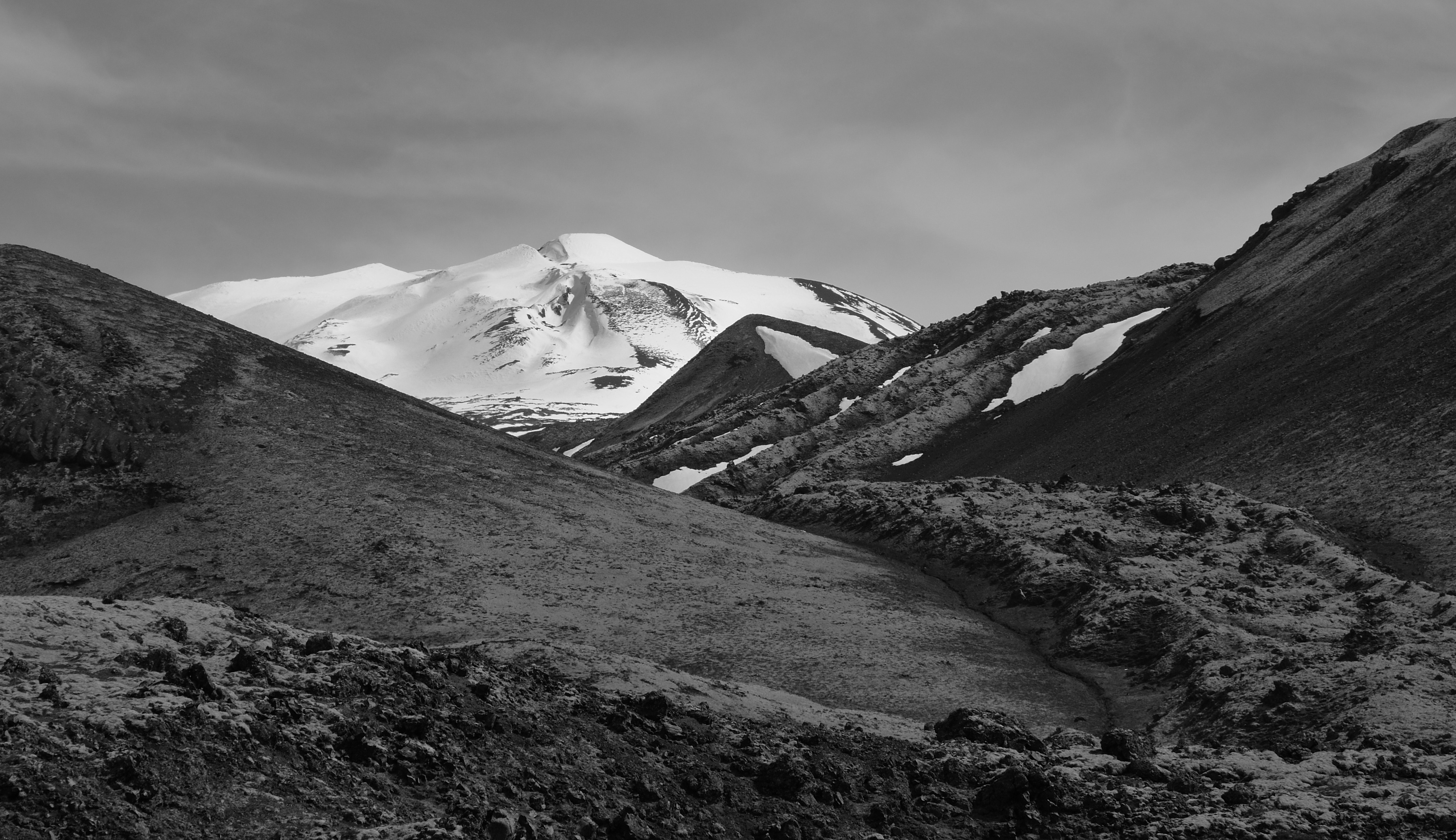
The Pæla lava field in 2009 with a lava river from the 1947 eruption

The explosive eruption increased in strength from 9–12 April and then from 28 April it reduced again. On 3 May, the volcano stopped throwing out lava in sudden explosions from its craters and changed to continuously ejecting tephra and ash for long periods, until early June when this reduced. On 2 September, the Shoulder Crater had a 960 m (3,150 ft) circumference at its top and the Summit Crater a 700 m (2,300 ft)circumference at its highest point, 90 m (300 ft) above the ridge. Sandy tephra and ash fell over Iceland in May and June, sometimes making it dark in the daytime near Hekla. The tephra caused fluorine poisoning of grazing sheep, making them unable to walk. That winter more craters formed, building up cones. Explosive activity had ceased six months after the first eruption. Lava flowed from the Lava Crater continuously during the eruption, starting at a rate of over 100 m^{3}·s^{−1}, dropping to 5–10 m^{3}·s^{−1} in April and early May at a speed of around 20 cm·s^{−1} before increasing, eventually reaching 150 m^{3}·s^{−1} at the end of June and at similar levels until mid-July with a peak flow speed of 2–2.5 m·s^{−1}. From there it gradually decreased to under 10 m^{3}·s^{−1} in November. Initially the lava comprised 57–58% SiO_{2} and 11% Fe_{2}O_{3}, from the time of peak flow onwards this changed to 54% SiO_{2} and 13.5% Fe_{2}O_{3}.

The lava river sometimes ran through lava tubes before emerging again. The lava front had a height of up to 15 m (49 ft). On 15 and 16 June, a branch of lava flow to the south of Melfell traveled over 1 km (0.62 mi) in 30 hours before slowing and stopping by 21 June, 7.8 km (4.8 mi) from the Lava Crater. The longest lava stream produced was 8 km (5.0 mi) long and stopped in Stóraskógsbotnar. A scientist filming one of the lava streams on 2 November was hit by a block of lava and was killed.

The lava flow stopped after 13 months on 21 April, having covered 40 km^{2} (15 sq mi) and with a maximum depth of 100 m (330 ft). The lava beds produced were mainly the ʻAʻā lava type with Pāhoehoe and lava a budella (lava tubes) areas. In April and May 1948 CO_{2} emitted from cracks in the ground pooled in hollows near to Hekla, killing 15 sheep and some wild animals and birds. In total 24,000 tonnes (26,000 tons) of CO_{2} was emitted. Ditches were dug by farmers to drain these hollows, and the CO_{2} emission had stopped by the end of the year.

=== 1970 to 1991 ===
1970

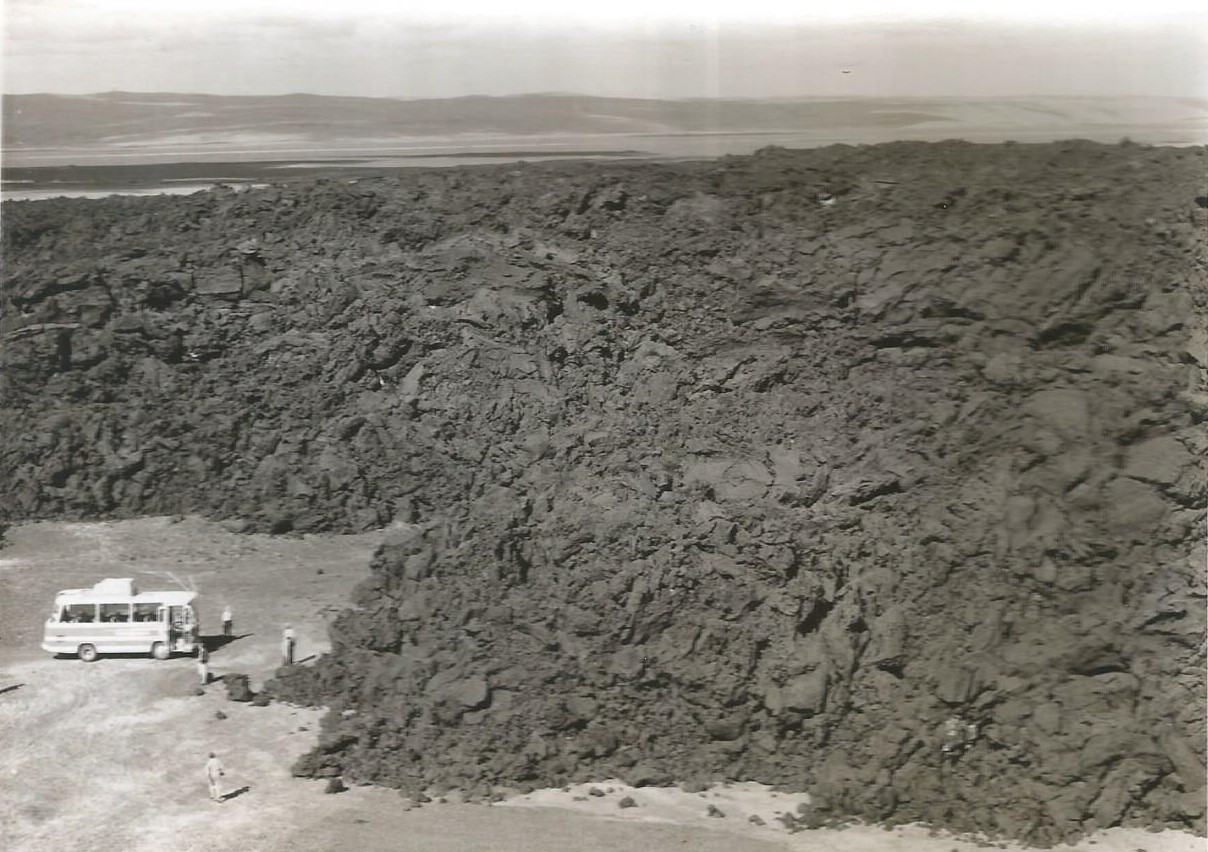
Lava flow from the 1970 eruption, seen in 1971

The 1970 eruption of Hekla started at 9:23 pm on 5 May 1970 and lasted until 5 July. It had a VEI of 3 and produced 0.2 km^{3} (0.048 cu mi) of lava covering an area of 18.5 km^{2} (7.1 sq mi) and 6.6×10 ^{7} m³ of tephra, deposited over an area of 40,000 km^{2} (15,000 sq mi), mainly to the northwest of the volcano.

The main Hekla fissure only erupted at its far southwest end, most of the eruption was from other fissures nearby. The eruption stopped in the south-southwest on 10 May and in Hlídargígar on 20 May, but a new fissure opened on the same day and lava flowed from this until 5 July. The lava was andesite containing olivine, similar to the lava produced later in the eruption of 1947.

Before the eruption, a greater than normal amount of snow melting had occurred, indicating the volcano was heating up. Earth tremors began at 8:48 pm on the evening of the eruption; the largest had a magnitude of 4. The eruption started weakly at 9:23 pm IMT ± 2 min before increasing in power. The first pumice fell on Búrfell power station, 15 km (9.3 mi) away, at 9:35 pm causing people to evacuate. The eruption seems to have started in two locations at the same time – to the Shoulder crater's south-southwest and below the Lava Crater. At 10:30 pm a crater at 780 m (2,560 ft) was producing a lava column which reached an altitude of around 1 km (0.62 mi). During the night a 700 m (2,300 ft) high lava fountain was thrown up from the main crater. A 500 m (1,600 ft) long fissure starting below the Lava Crater opened, and lava fountains and other lava flows emanated from it. One hour into the eruption, a new 400 m (1,300 ft) fissure opened to the northeast, producing two main lava fountains, and shortly after another adjoining fissure opened producing lava fountains to a height of 500 m (1,600 ft). At around midnight, another fissure opened northwest of the Lava Crater, later hurling an over 300 m (980 ft) long lava fountain, 200–300 m (660–980 ft) into the air. By midnight lava had already covered over 1 km^{2} (0.39 sq mi) and this extended to 7.5 km^{2} (2.9 sq mi) by next morning implying a flow rate of around 1500 m³/s.

For the first two hours, tephra was produced at the rate of 10000 m³/s. The cloud from the eruption, which had reached 53,000 feet (16,154 m) by 10:10 pm, caused a lightning storm. The tephra was transported northwards by the wind, causing the sky to turn black in places – 190 km (120 mi) away at Blönduós tephra fell from midnight until 2 am, and ash fell on a trawler 330 km (210 mi) away at 2 am. Icelanders sampled the tephra fall in their locality by putting a plate outside to capture everything that fell onto it. This, and other measurements, showed the area covered was long and narrow with the 1 mm contour (an equivalent of 8 tonnes per hectare) extending to the north coast.

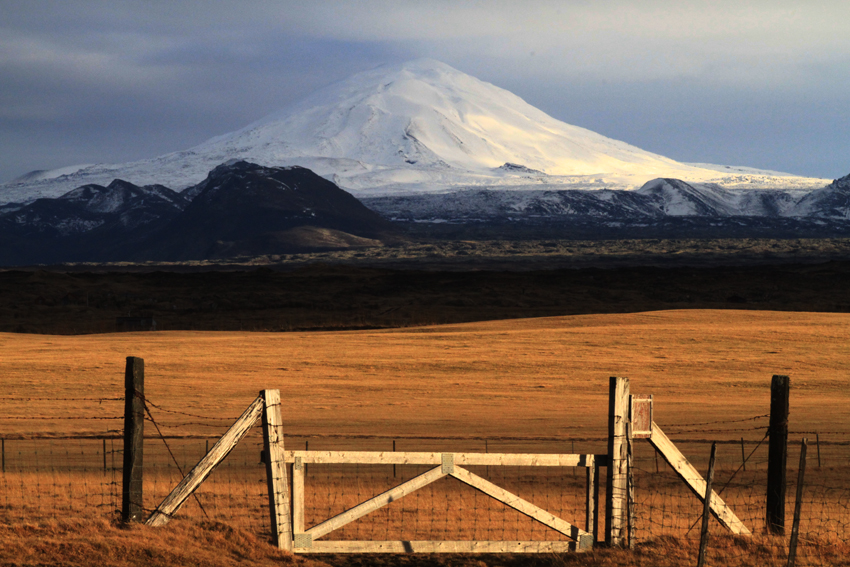
Hekla in winter 2010

By 5:30 on 6 May, the lava flow measured 4 km (2.5 mi) long. Many lava bombs were found near the main crater, one had an area of 6 m^{2} (65 sq ft) and a likely weight of 12 tons. Xenoliths formed around 2% of the material produced by the craters. These were of rock types including basalt, andesite, ignimbrite and sedimentary rock.

The eruption became stronger at Skjólkvíar on 12 May, with columns of steam attaining a height of 2,500 m (8,200 ft). The eruption intensity then gradually reduced until it stopped on 20 May. The lava field then had an area of 5.8 km^{2} (2.2 sq mi). Later that day a 900 m (3,000 ft) long fissure opened 1 m^{2} (11 sq ft)1 km north of the main Hlídargígar crater. That night it contained 17 lava fountains, each 20–50 m (66–164 ft) in height. By the evening of the next day, 10–12 craters had formed, each throwing pieces of lava 50–100 m (160–330 ft) in the air. This row of craters was named Öldugígar. Gradually the number of active craters decreased, the most active of these built a cone 100 m (330 ft) higher than the level of the ridge. Lava flowed from its base until mid-June when the lava cut through the north crater wall. The larger cones produced more tephra, occasionally with lightning within the tephra cloud. By 5 July, the eruption had stopped.

During eruptions of Hekla, fluorine is produced and sticks to the surfaces of the grains of tephra. Fine grains can have a fluorine content of 350 ppm, and fluorine poisoning can start in sheep at a diet with fluorine content of 25 ppm. At 250 ppm, death can occur within a few days. In 1783, 79% of the Icelandic sheep stock were killed, probably as a result of fluorosis caused by the eruption of Lakagígar. Some of the ash produced in this eruption had a fluorine content of 0.2%, and two days after the eruption contaminated grass had a dry weight content of up to 0.4% fluorine. 450 farms and 95,000 sheep were affected by the eruption. Some sheep were kept inside and fed on hay or moved, but other farmers were forced to graze their flocks outside.

1980 and 1981

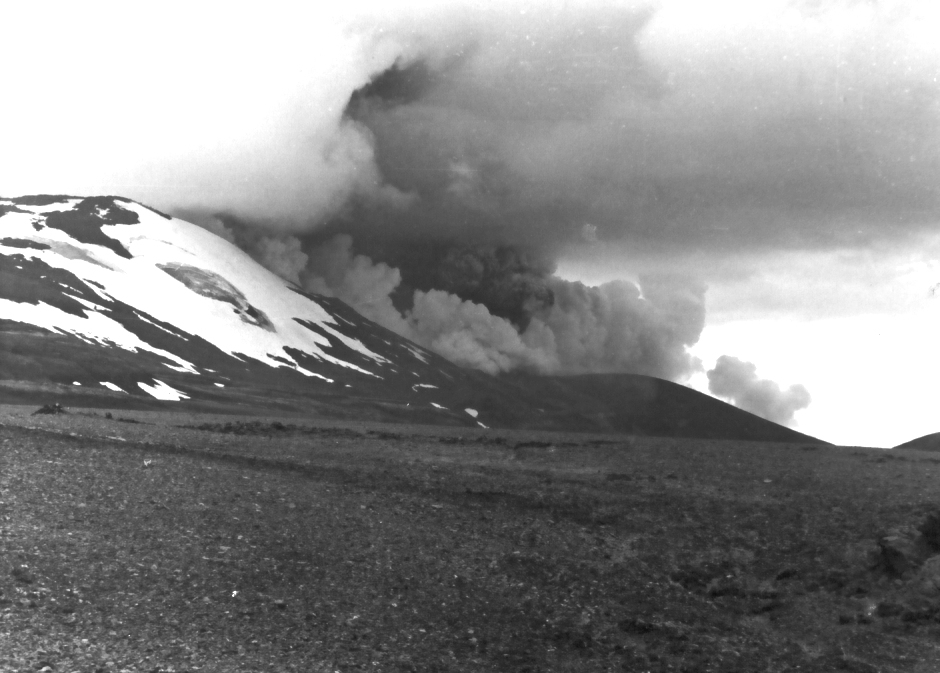
Hekla erupting in 1980. Seen from 4 km NE of the summit.

This VEI-3 eruption started at 13:28 on 17 August 1980 and lasted until 20 August 1980. It was a mixed eruption producing a lava volume of 0.12 km^{3} (0.029 cu mi) and a tephra volume of 5.8×10^{7} m^{3} (2.0×10^{9} cu ft). The fissure opened along a 7 km (4.3 mi) length. Shortly before the eruption started a steam column was produced; eventually the eruption column reached a height of 15 km (9.3 mi). The main tephra deposits were to the north-northeast and lasted for around 2 hours. Deposits were 20 cm (7.9 in) thick 10 km (6.2 mi) from the summit, decreasing to less than 1 mm (0.039 in) at the coast 230 km (140 mi) away. Lava was initially produced from close to the summit, spreading to other parts of the fissure and covering an area of 22 km^{2} (8.5 sq mi) in around 24 hours. The last scoria were seen on the morning of 20 August. This was an unusual eruption both in the short time since the previous eruption – the shortest since 1104, and the length – previous eruptions had lasted from 2 months to 2 years rather than just 3 days.

The 1981 eruption, which is regarded as being a continuation of the previous year's eruption, began at 3 am on 9 April 1981, had a VEI of 2 and produced 3×10^{7} m^{3} (1.1×10^{9} cu ft) of lava, lasting until 16 April 1981. The eruption threw ash to a height of 6.6 km (4.1 mi), and a new crater formed at the summit from which 3 lava flows originated. These extended to a maximum of 4.5 km (2.8 mi) from the volcano, covering 5–6 km^{2} (1.9–2.3 sq mi).

1991

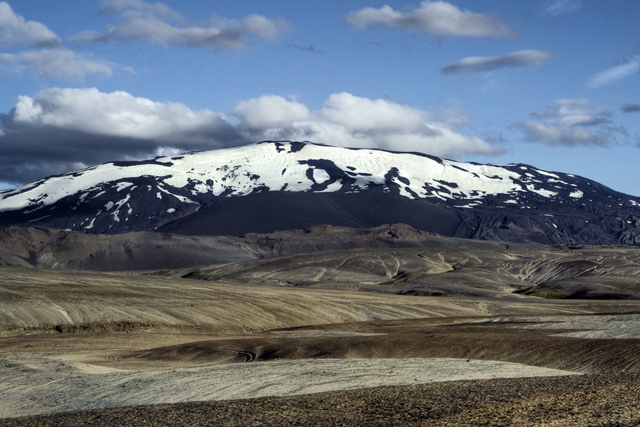
A summer 2009 view of Hekla from the side.

A VEI-3 eruption occurred from 17 January 1991 to 11 March 1991, producing 0.15 km^{3} (0.036 cu mi) of lava and 2×10^{7} m^{3} (7.1×10^{8} cu ft) of tephra. The eruption, which was preceded by sulphurous smells and earthquakes, started as a Plinian eruption, producing an ash cloud reaching an altitude of 11.5 km (7.1 mi) within 10 minutes which had travelled over 200 km (120 mi) north-northeast to the coast within 3 hours. The eruption then began producing andesitic lava, the flows eventually covering an area of 23 km^{2} (8.9 sq mi) to an average depth of 6–7 m (20–23 ft). Initially, part of the Heklugjá fissure and other fissures erupted with lava fountains reaching 300 m (980 ft) in height. By the second day, the activity stopped in all but one fissure where the main crater formed. During these 2 days, 800 m³/s of lava were produced, slowing to between 1 m³/s and 14 m³/s for most of the eruption. This low viscosity lava had a SiO_{2} content of approximately 54%.

=== 2000 ===
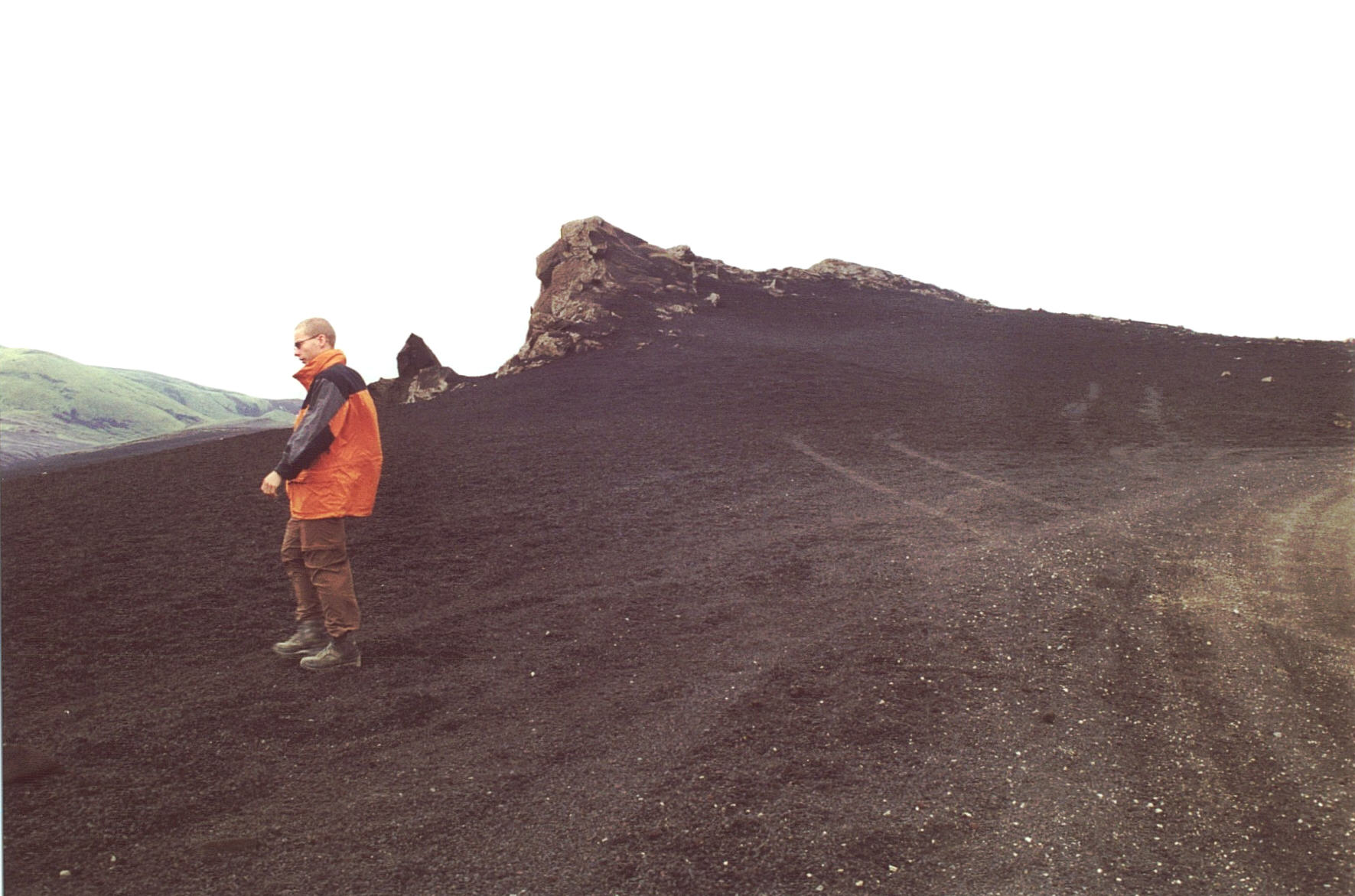
A lava field on Hekla in July 2000

The most recent eruption was relatively short; it started at 18:18 on 26 February 2000 and lasted until 8 March. It was a VEI-3 eruption producing a lava volume of 0.189 km^{3} (0.045 cu mi), DRE 0.29 km^{3} (0.070 cu mi) and 1×10^{7} m^{3} (3.5×10^{8} cu ft)m^{3} of tephra. The eruption went through four phases:

1. initial explosive stage
2. fire fountains
3. bursts of Strombolian eruption
4. effusion of lava

Eruption activity was at a maximum in the first hour, and by the first night the fissure on Hekla had opened to a length of 6–7 km (3.7–4.3 mi). The steam column rose to a height of almost 15 km (9.3 mi), and ash was transported to Grímsey on the North coast of Iceland. During this eruption, a NASA DC-8 aeroplane accidentally flew through the plume with all instruments switched on, resulting in unprecedented measurement of a young volcanic plume.

Up until this eruption, it had been assumed that Hekla was incapable of producing the most dangerous of volcanic phenomena, the pyroclastic flow. In January 2003, however, a team from the Norvol Institute in Reykjavík, under the leadership of Dr. Ármann Höskuldsson, reported that they found traces of a pyroclastic flow, roughly 5 km long, stretching down the side of the mountain. This will call for a reappraisal of volcanic eruptions of the basic rock type, which up to now were generally thought not to produce large pyroclastic flows. It will also require that the public and curious spectators who always rush to the scene at the start of a new outbreak, be kept much further away from the volcanic activity than was thought necessary during previous outbreaks.

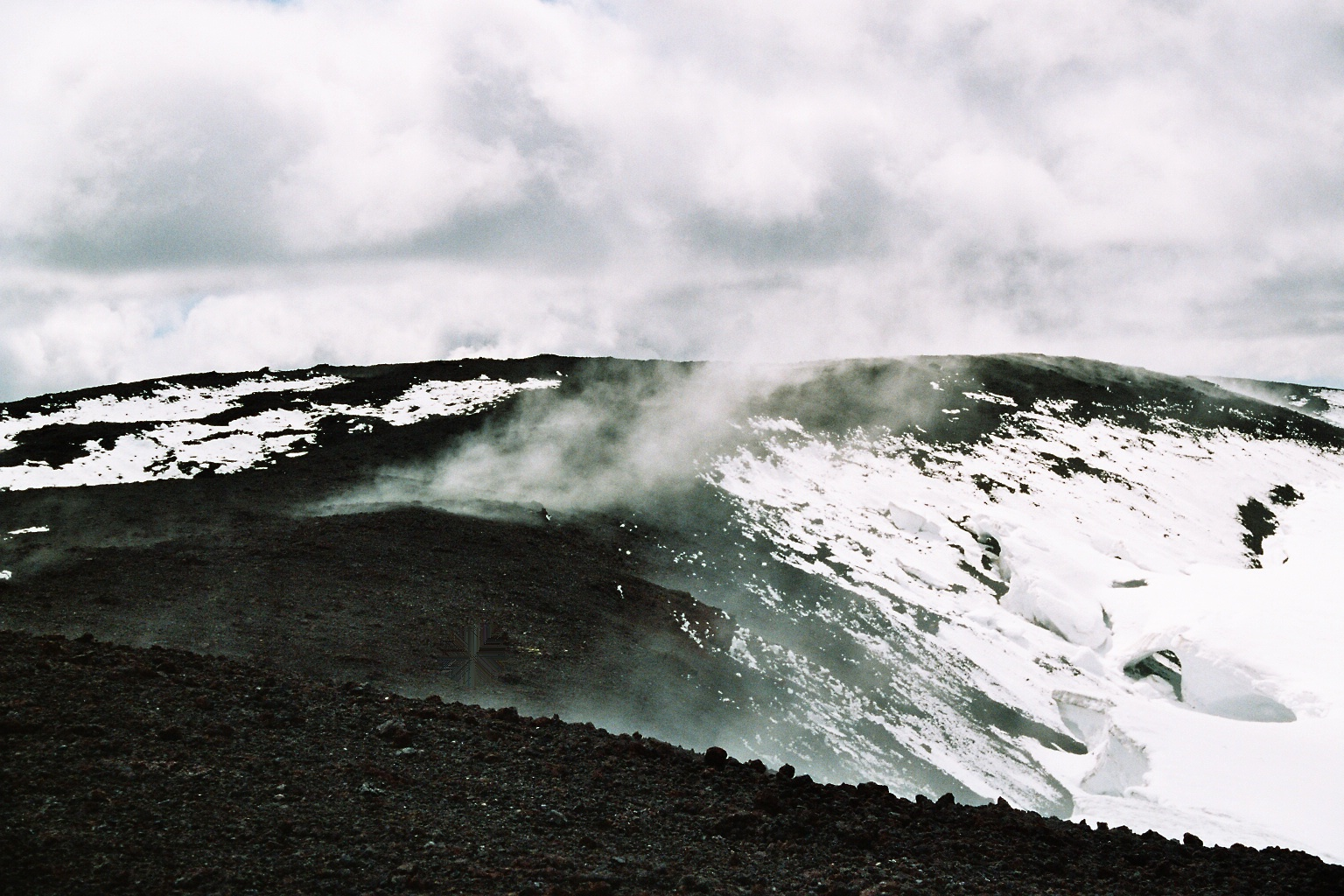
Steam at the summit of Hekla

=== Eruption Summary ===
Summary of known eruptions
Start Date	Years before 1950 (BP)	VEI	Lava volume (km^{3})	Tephra volume (km^{3})	Comment
February 26, 2000	-	3	0.19	0.01	Eruption ended March 8, 2000
January 17, 1991	-	3	0.15	0.02	Eruption ended March 11, 1991
April 9, 1981	-	2	0.03	-	Eruption ended April 16, 1981
August 17, 1980	-	3	0.12	0.06	Eruption ended August 20, 1980
May 5, 1970		3	0.2	0.07	Eruption ended July 5, 1970
March 29, 1947	3	4	0.8	0.18	Eruption ended April 21, 1948
April 25, 1913	37	2	0.05	-	Eruption ended May 18, 1913
February 27, 1878	72	2	0.2	-	Eruption ended April 1878
September 2, 1845	96	4	0.63	0.23	Eruption ended about April 5, 1846
April 5, 1766	184	4	1.3	0.4	Eruption ended in May 1768. Tephra composition is rhyolite to dacite (Icelandite).
April 2, 1725	225	1	-	-	
February 13, 1693	257	4	-	0.3	Eruption ended about September 14, 1693
May 8, 1636	314	3	-	0.18	Eruption ended in June 1637
January 3, 1597	353	4		0.29	Eruption ended in or after June 1597
May 1554	396	2	0.1	-	Eruption ended about June 1554
July 25, 1510	440	4	-	0.32	
December 1389	561	3	0.2	0.15	Eruption ended in 1390
May 19, 1341	609	3	-	0.18	
July 11, 1300	650	4	0.5	0.5	Eruption ended in July 1301. Tephra composition is rhyolite to dacite (Icelandite).
1222	728	2	-	0.04	
December 4, 1206	744	3	-	0.4	Dated using historical records.
January 19, 1158	792	4	0.1	0.33	
October 15, 1104	846	5	0	2.0	H 1 tephra, composition is rhyolite. Erupted within 45 days of date.
1050 ± 500	900 ± 500	-	-	-	
781 ± 2	1169 ± 2	-	-	-	Greenland ice core
753 ± 2	1197 ± 2	-	-	-	Greenland ice core
650 ± 500	1300 ± 500	-	-	-	
550 ± 1500	1400 ± 1500	-	-	-	
350 ± 500	1600 ± 500	-	-	-	
250 ± 1500	1700 ± 1500	-	-	-	
150 ± 2500 BCE	2100 ± 2500	-	-	-	
250 ± 500 BCE	2200 ± 500	-	-	-	
650 ± 2500 BCE	2600 ± 2500	-	-	-	
750 ± 500 BCE	2700 ± 500	-	-	-	
850 ± 80 BCE	2800 ± 80	-	-	-	H C dacite (Icelandite) tephra.
1063 ± 140 BCE	3013 ± 140	5	-	10	H 3 dacite, rhyolite tephra. Cal. BP
1150 ± 1500 BCE	3100 ± 1500	-	-	-	
1250 ± 1500 BCE	3200 ± 1500	-	-	-	
1350 ± 2500 BCE	3300 ± 2500	-	-	-	
1550 BCE	3500	4	-	-	
1650 ± 2500 BCE	3600 ± 2500	-	-	-	
1750 ± 500 BCE	3700 ± 500	-	-	-	
1850 ± 2500 BCE	3800 ± 2500	-	-	2.0	
2375 ± 8 BCE	4325 ± 8	5	-	10.0	H 4 rhyolite tephra.Ice core age used.
2335 ± 180 BCE	4285 ± 180	-	-	-	H 4270 alkali basalt tephra. Age corrected for H4 ice core age to maintain mean 10 year separation.
2450 ± 1500 BCE	4400 ± 1500	-	-	-	
2750 ± 2500 BCE	4700 ± 2500	-	-	-	
2950 ± 500 BCE	4900 ± 500	-	-	-	
3350 ± 2500 BCE	5300 ± 2500	-	-	-	
3450 ± 1500 BCE	5400 ± 1500	-	-	-	
3750 ± 1500 BCE	5700 ± 1500	-	-	-	
3950 ± 500 BCE	5900 ± 500	-	-	-	
4050 ± 500 BCE	6000 ± 500	-	-	-	
4110 ± 100 BCE	6060 ± 100	5	0	1	
4150 ± 2500 BCE	6100 ± 2500	-	-	-	
4250 ± 500 BCE	6200 ± 500	-	-	-	
4650 ± 500 BCE	6600 ± 500	-	-	-	
4700 BCE	6650	4	-	-	Date only constrained by before and after eruptions
4750 ± 2500 BCE	6700 ± 2500	-	-	-	
4950 ± 2500 BCE	6900 ± 2500	-	-	-	
5050 BCE	7000	-	-	-	Date only constrained by before and after eruptions
5103 ± 260 BCE	7053 ± 260	5	-	3	H 5 basaltic to rhyolite tephra. Cal BP age used.
5850 ± 2500 BCE	7800 ± 2500	-	-	-	
8600 ± 150 BCE	10550 ± 150	-	-	-	H 10550 alkali basalt tephra.

== Flora and fauna ==
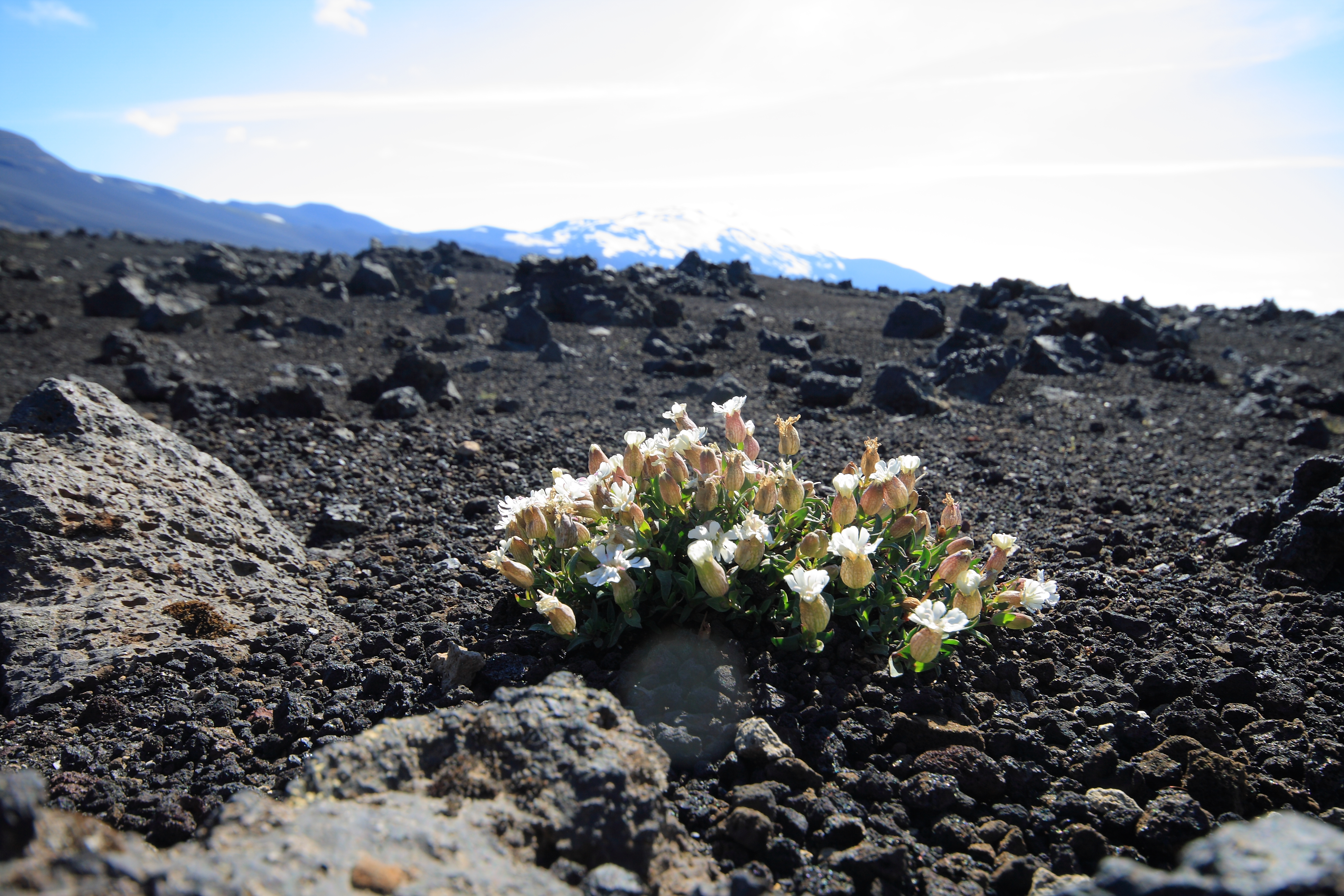
Sea Campion colonising ground close to Hekla

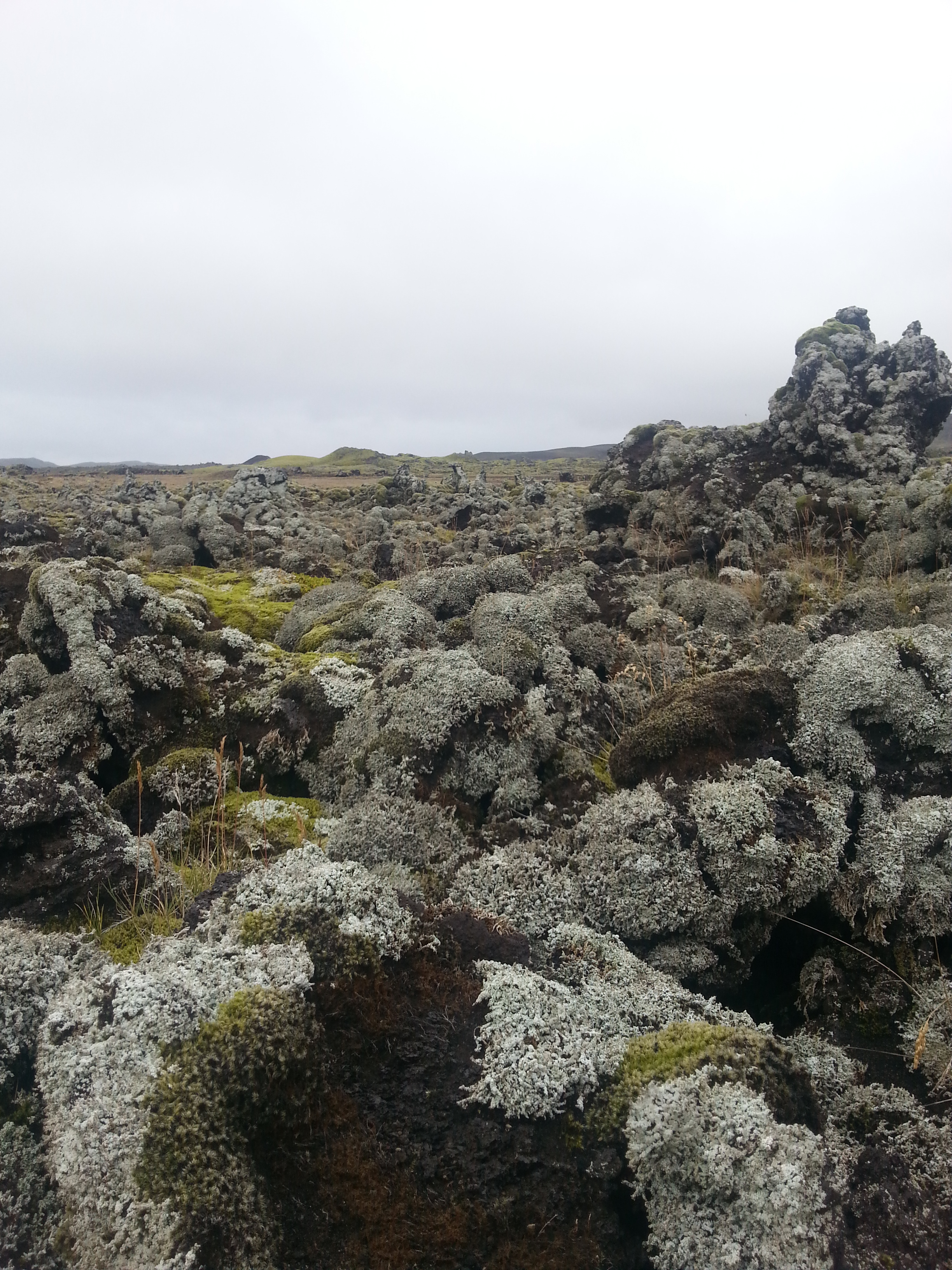
The lichens Stereocaulon vesuvianum and moss Racomitrium ericoides on lava originating from Hekla.

The Hekla area was once forested. Forest and some grasses are much more resilient to ash and pumice fall than low vegetation, but the combined effect of human habitation and the volcanic activity has left an unstable surface very susceptible to erosion. Hekluskógar, a 90,000 ha (220,000 acres) reforesting project is attempting to restore the birch and willow woodland to the slopes of Hekla, starting with soil fertilisation and grass sowing. This would stabilize the large areas of volcanic ash, help to reduce wind erosion of the frost heaved surface, slow drainage rates and hence water erosion, and ultimately increase biodiversity. It is the largest reforestation of its type in Europe. After an eruption, almost all of the 'safe sites' on new lava flows are colonised by mosses within 20 years expanding to a homogeneous layer up to 20 cm (7.9 in) thick typically within 50 years.

Past eruptions have been associated with death of birds and live-stock related to either the high fluoride content of the tephra, carbon dioxide suffocation or toxic carbon monoxide gas release, and must have had local die back in the ecosystems. Local plant succession on the lava fields after eruptions has been better studied and there are four broad stages of natural succession with importantly the potential for regression:

1. In first 70 years colonization and cover coalescence of moss Racomitrium lanuginosum and the Stereocaulon mosses
2. Moss secondary colonization to Racomitrium lanuginosum dominance which can take between 170 and 700 years
3. After 600 years vascular plant dominance evolving towards the birch wood land climax ecosystem in Iceland if no disturbance
4. Highland conditions/retrogression after tephra deposition which had occurred up to 860 years after the initial lava flow

Local factors and other disturbances influence these rates but the 1991 laval flow first stage was completed in 24 years. The basaltic volcanic soil development is typical for Iceland. Vegetation height prior to a tephra fall is the single most important factor for vascular plant survival so the presence of a woodland before a further large tephra deposit enhances regrowth.

== Sport and recreation ==
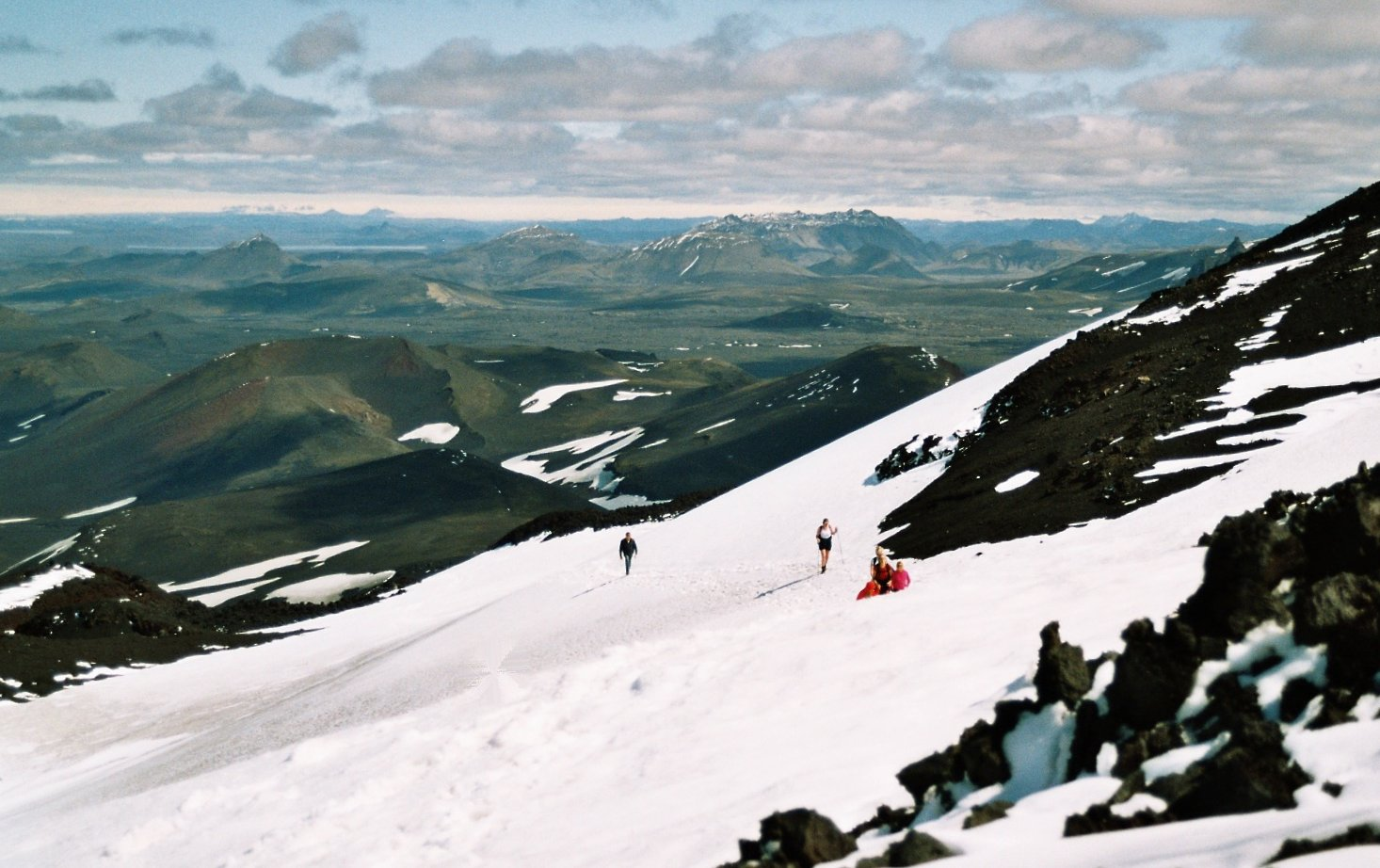
Walkers on the slopes of Hekla (June 2005)

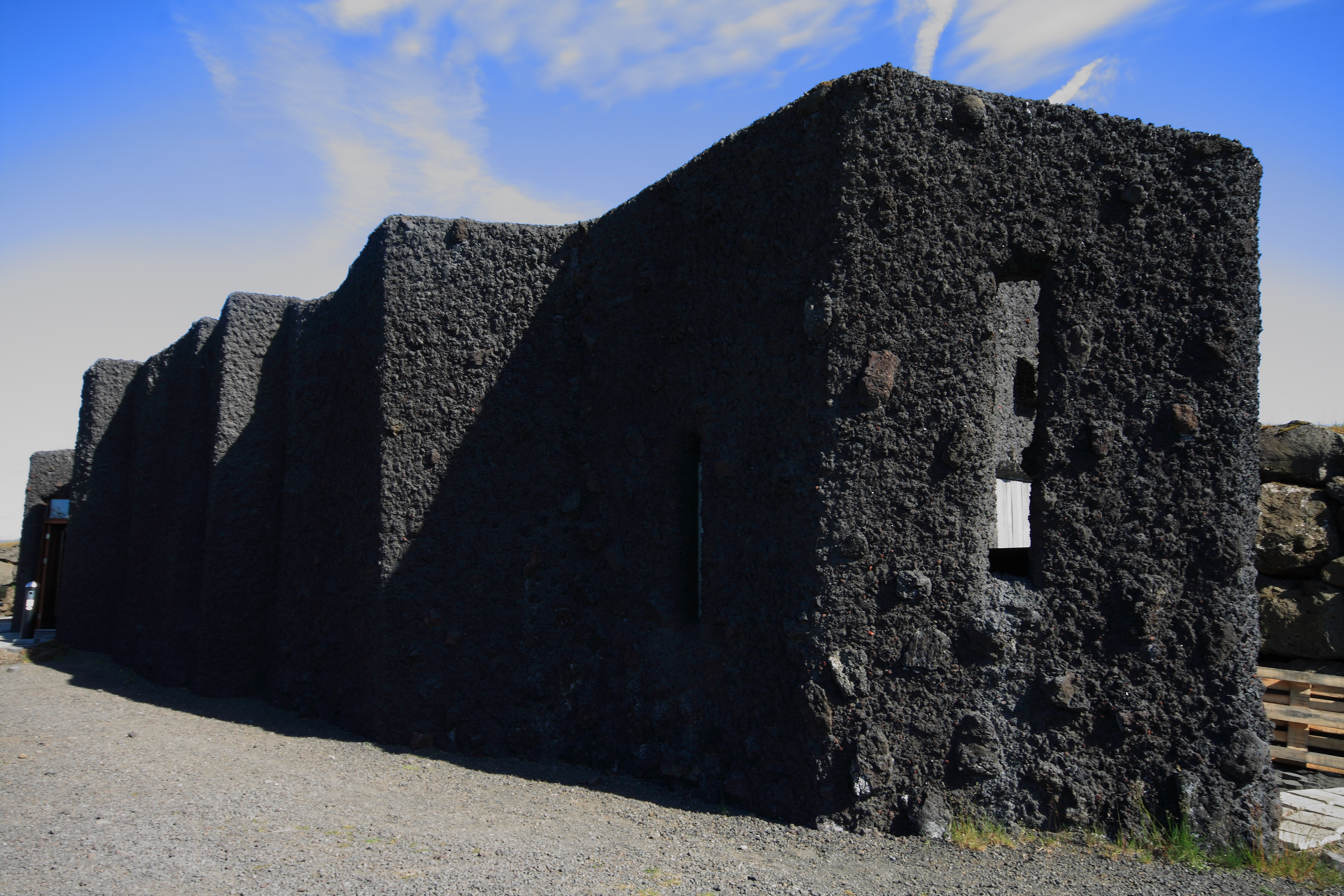
The Hekla Centre

Hekla is a popular destination for hiking. Following the most recent eruption the path goes most of the way to the summit; the walk takes 3 to 4 hours. In spring, skiing is possible on short routes around the rim of the crater. In summer, there are easy (F) mountaineering routes also around the crater rim, and it is possible to snowcat to the top in winter. The volcano can be reached using the buses to Landmannalaugar 30 km (19 mi) further east, and it is possible to stay or camp at farms in the area. A visitor centre, The Hekla Center at Leirubakki Farm, opened in 2007.

== In popular culture ==
Hekla has featured in artistic works since the time of its medieval infamy.

=== Architecture ===
The Tour Hekla, a 220-metre-tall (720 ft) skyscraper in La Défense, Paris, France, built in 2022, is named after the volcano.

=== Films ===
In the Spanish apocalyptic science fiction film, Los Últimos Días (2013), some news reporters speculate that three recent eruptions of Hekla could have caused the spreading form of agoraphobia that kills affected people who go outside.

The climax of Robert Eggers's 2022 film The Northman takes place on the slopes of Hekla.

=== Food ===
In the Boston, Massachusetts area, Hekla pastries can be found – large, upside-down cinnamon rolls with white sugar icing spooned over the top to look like the snow-topped volcano.

=== Literature ===
The British poet William Blake showed Winter being banished to Hekla in To Winter, one of the works from his Poetical Sketches.

In To Lie With Lions, by Dorothy Dunnett, a party of merchants visiting Iceland in the year 1471 witnesses the spectacular (fictional) eruption of both Hekla and Katla.

Mt. Hekla is referenced in the third chapter of Herman Melville's novel Moby Dick, in EE Ryan's The Odd Saga of the American and a Curious Icelandic Flock, and in the final chapters of Joan Aiken's novel Is.

The Hekla 3 eruption and the ensuing volcanic winter play a large role in Stephen Baxter's alternate-history novel Bronze Winter.

=== Music ===
The piece Hekla, Op 52 (1964) by Icelandic composer Jón Leifs, has been called the "loudest classical music of all time". The requirements for a performance of Hekla include four sets of rocks hit with hammers, steel plates, anvils, sirens, cannons, metal chains, choir, a large orchestra, and organ.

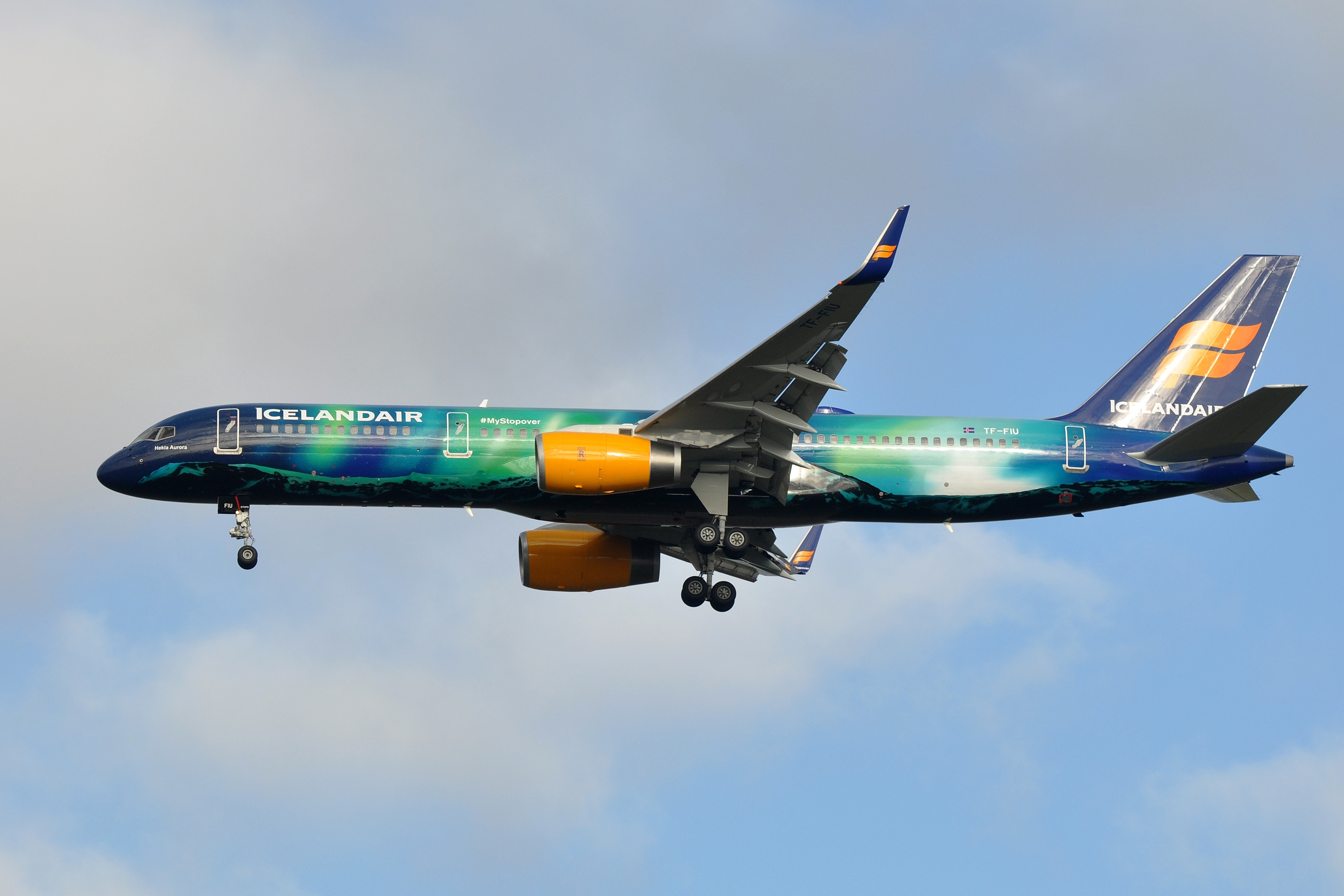
Icelandair's Hekla Aurora in 2014

=== Transportation ===
A small Danish cruiser launched in 1890 was named Hekla; it was scrapped in 1955.

A Danish steamer called Hekla also saw combat in the First Schleswig War.

Icelandair named one of their aircraft after Hekla.

There have been several ships of the Royal Navy named HMS Hecla

=== Performing Arts ===
Heklina, the stage name for prominent Icelandic-American drag performer Stefan Grygelko, was inspired by Hekla. Grygelko, whose mother was Icelandic, spent part of his childhood in Iceland and helped to open a gay bar in Reykjavik before relocating to San Francisco. Heklina's mysterious and unsolved death in London in April 2023, and the ensuing homophobia demonstrated by London police, caused international headlines.

=== Organizations ===
In October 2011 a German left-wing militant group called the Hekla-Empfangskomitee (Hekla Reception Committee) set at least 17 incendiary devices on railways in the Berlin area, with 2 of them going off.

The DBU Copenhagen football club Boldklubben Hekla play at Hekla Park.

== See also ==
- Geography of Iceland
- Iceland plume
- Iceland hotspot
- Volcanism of Iceland
  - List of volcanic eruptions in Iceland
  - List of volcanoes in Iceland

== Bibliography ==
- Thorarinsson, Sigurdur (1970). Hekla, A Notorious Volcano. trans. Jóhann Hannesson, Pétur Karlsson. Reykjavík: Almenna bókafélagið.
