= Hekluskógar =

Reforesting project in Iceland

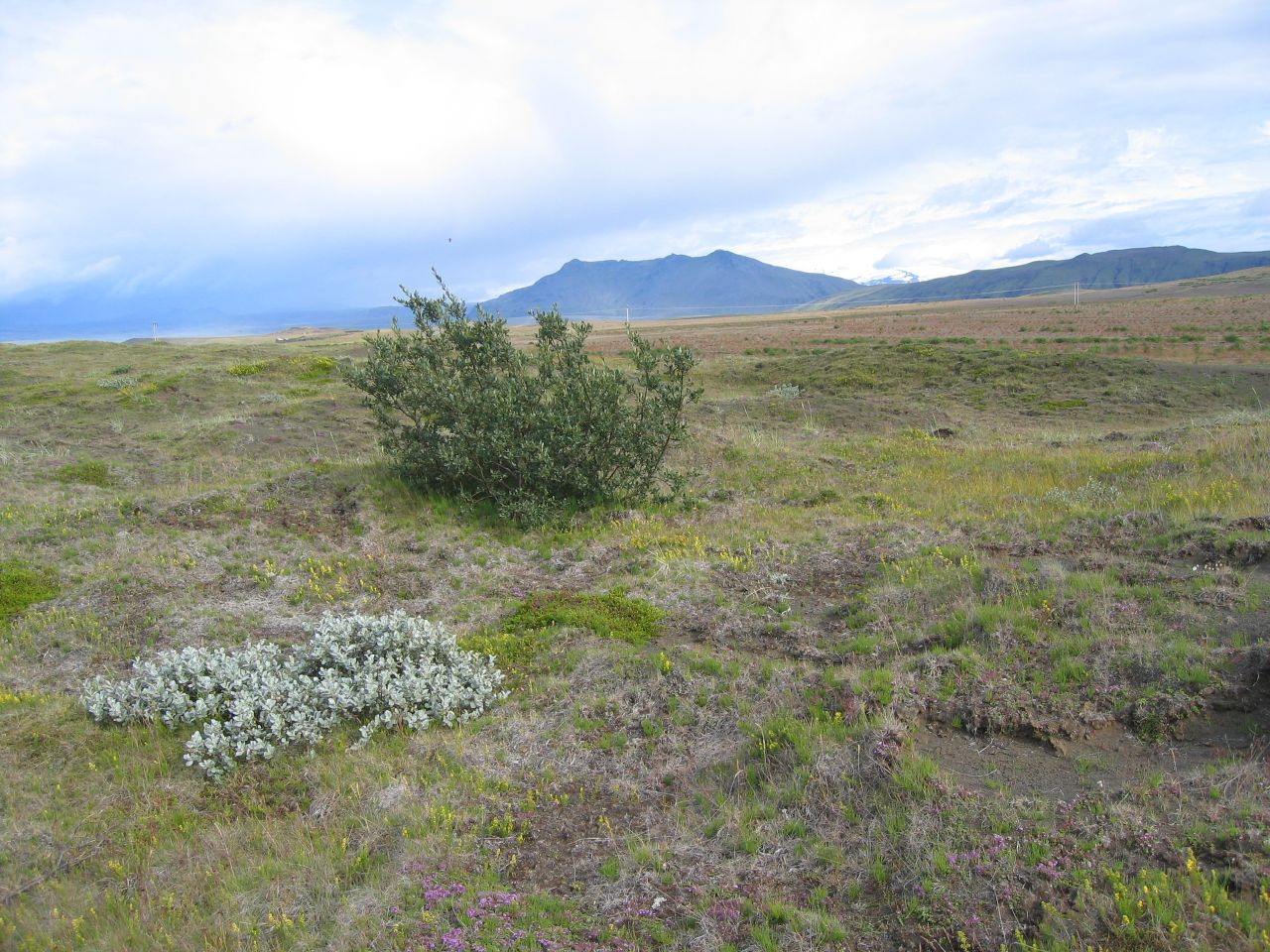
Birch and willow (Salix lanata) growing in the southern edge of Hekluskógar at Langalda between Gunnarsholt and Keldur

Hekluskógar (Icelandic pronunciation: [ˈhɛhklʏˌskouː(ɣ)ar̥], "Hekla Forest") is a reforesting project in Iceland near the volcano Hekla. The main objective is to reclaim woodlands of native birch and willow to the slopes of Hekla starting with soil fertilisation and grass sowing. This would prevent volcanic ash from blowing over nearby areas after eruption in Hekla and help to reduce wind erosion. It is the largest reforestation of its type in Europe and is estimated to cover 1% of the area of Iceland.
