= HMS Hecla =

Seven ships of the Royal Navy have been named HMS Hecla, after the volcano Hekla in Iceland.

- HMS Hecla (1797) was a 10-gun bomb vessel purchased in 1797. She participated in the Battle of Copenhagen (1801) and was broken up in 1813
- HMS Hecla (1815), launched in 1815, was a Hecla-class bomb vessel; she was later converted to an exploration ship and was commanded by William Edward Parry during his exploration of the Arctic
- HMS Hecla (1839) was a 4-gun Hydra-class wooden paddle sloop launched in 1839, run aground off Gibraltar on 23 January 1855 and sold in 1863
- HMS Hecla (1878) was a torpedo boat carrier/depot ship purchased in 1878, modernised in 1912 and sold in 1926
- HMS Hecla (1940) was a destroyer depot ship launched in March 1940 and sunk off Casablanca on 12 November 1942 by the German submarine U-515
- HMS Hecla was a repair ship launched in 1944 and transferred to the United States Navy as USS Xanthus
- HMS Hecla (A133), launched in 1964, was a Hecla-class survey vessel sold in 1997
