= Basalt fan structure =

Formation of columnar jointed igneous rock

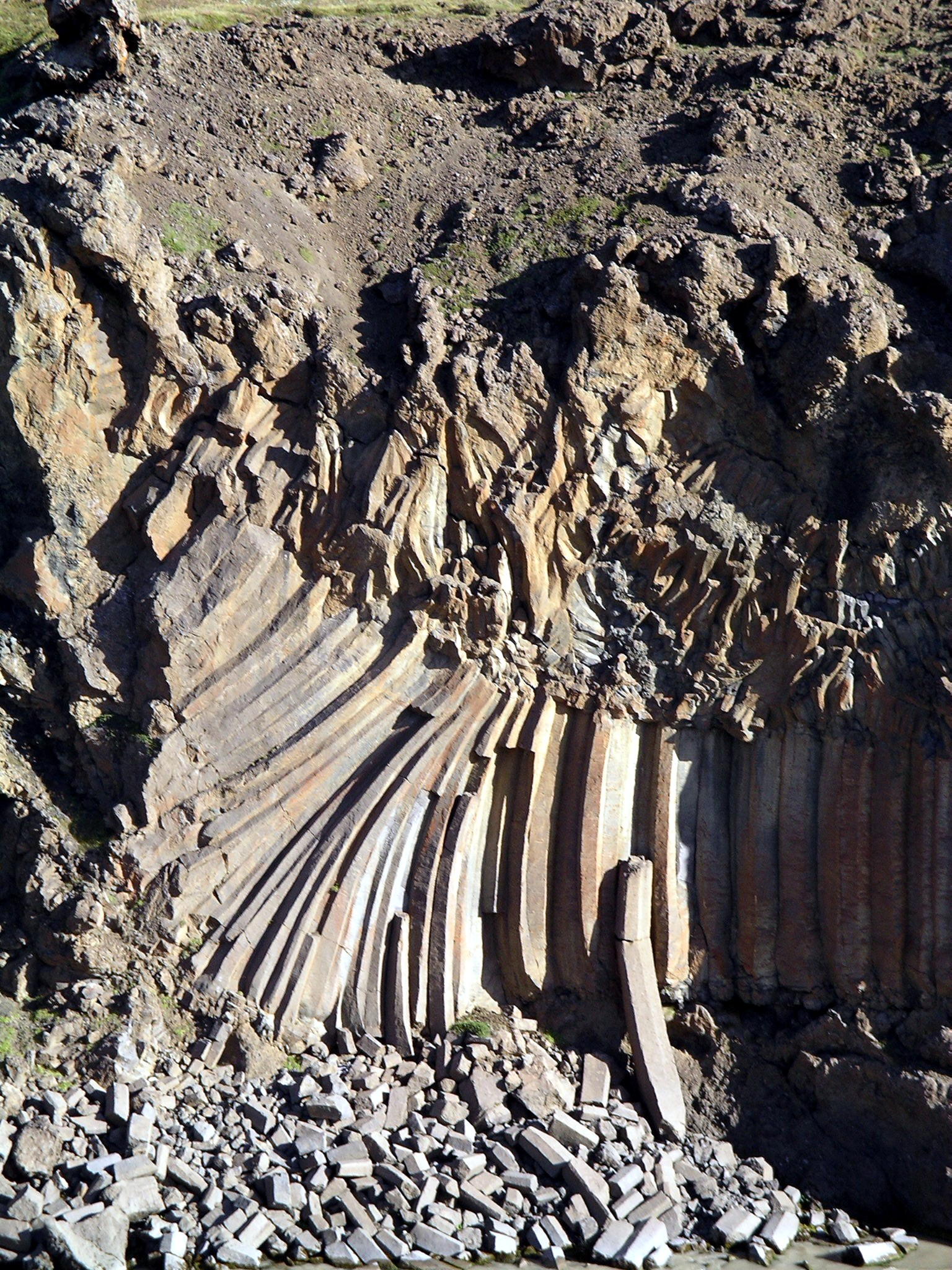
Columnar basalt at Suðurárhraun

A basalt fan structure is a basalt formation composed of columnar jointed basalt columns that have slumped into a fan shape.

Such formations are most likely created when basalt lava is intruded into a soft material, such as loose volcanic ash, which is unable to support the intrusion. As the basalt cools and forms columns, the ash collapses, causing the lava spread and form a fan shape. The formations can be vertical or any degree of horizontal.
