= Krossá =

Krossá may refer to:

- Krossá (Markarfljót), a feeder of the Markarfljót
- Krossá (Skjálfandafljót), a feeder of the Skjálfandafljót
- Krossá (Bitrufjörður)
