= Lundarbrekka =

- Hamlet
- Map showing location of Lundarbrekka
- Coordinates: 65°25′55.54″N 17°21′9.30″W
- Country: Iceland
- Region: Northeast

Area
  - Land: 0.07 km^{2} (0.027 sq mi)
- Elevation: 291 m (955 ft)

Lundarbrekka (Icelandic pronunciation: [ˈlʏntarˌprɛhka]) is a hamlet in Northeastern Region, Iceland, just off the Lundarbrekkuveger road. It is situated on the east side of a valley, 7.46 kilometres (4.64 mi), as the crow flies, from Aldeyjarfoss. There is a historic farm in the hamlet.
