= Joint (geology) =

Type of fracture in rock

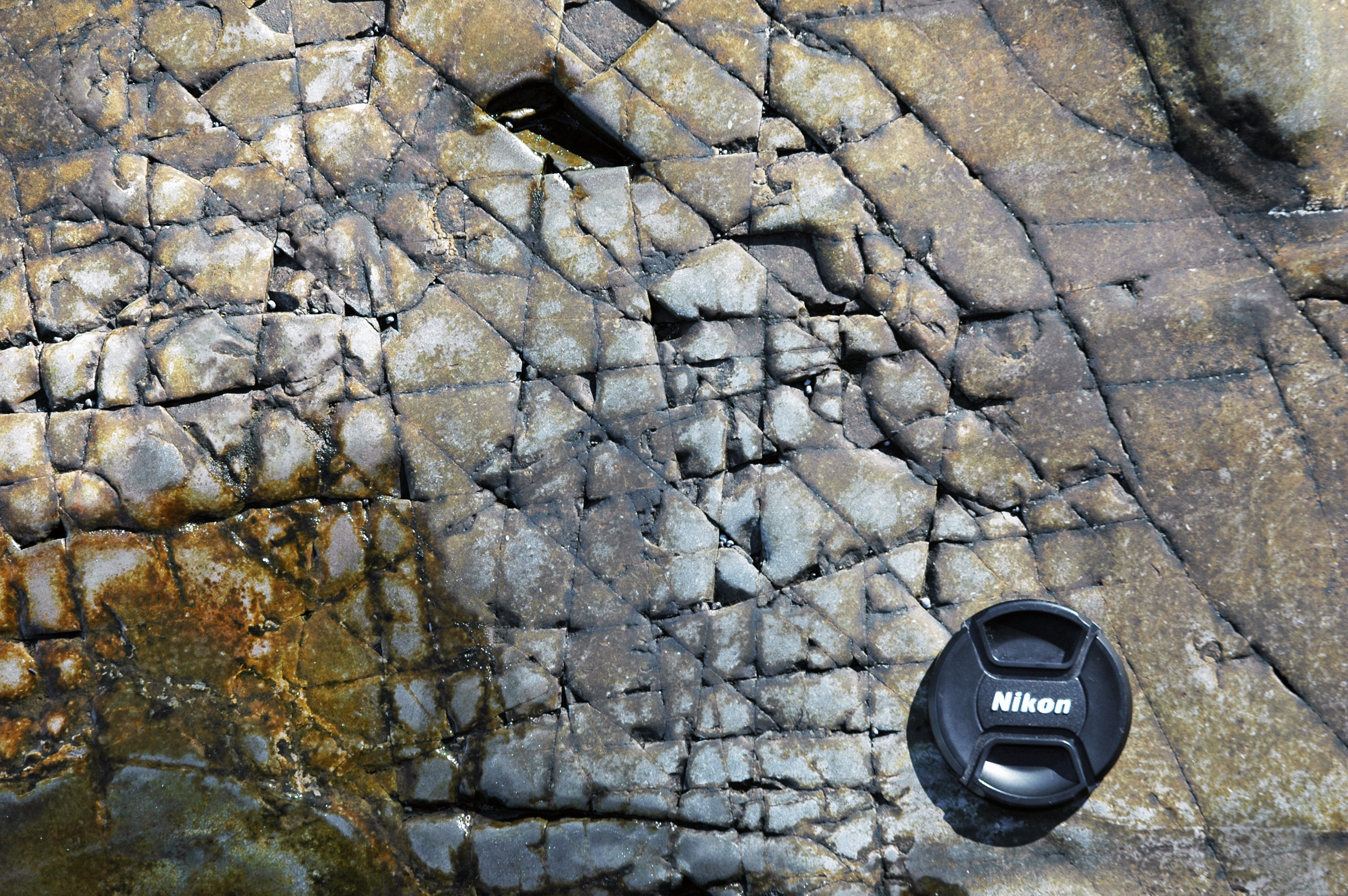
Jointed rocks as seen in the Bar Harbor Formation, Bar Harbor, Maine.

In geology, and more specifically in structural geology, a joint is a break (fracture) of natural origin in a layer or body of rock that lacks visible or measurable movement parallel to the surface (plane) of the fracture ("Mode 1" Fracture). Although joints can occur singly, they most frequently appear as joint sets and systems. A joint set is a family of parallel, evenly spaced joints that can be identified through mapping and analysis of their orientations, spacing, and physical properties. A joint system consists of two or more intersecting joint sets.

The distinction between joints and faults hinges on the terms visible or measurable, a difference that depends on the scale of observation. Faults differ from joints in that they exhibit visible or measurable lateral movement between the opposite surfaces of the fracture ("Mode 2" and "Mode 3" Fractures). Thus a joint may be created by either strict movement of a rock layer or body perpendicular to the fracture or by varying degrees of lateral displacement parallel to the surface (plane) of the fracture that remains "invisible" at the scale of observation.

Joints are among the most universal geologic structures, found in almost every exposure of rock. They vary greatly in appearance, dimensions, and arrangement, and occur in quite different tectonic environments. Often, the specific origin of the stresses that created certain joints and associated joint sets can be quite ambiguous, unclear, and sometimes controversial. The most prominent joints occur in the most well-consolidated, lithified, and highly competent rocks, such as sandstone, limestone, quartzite, and granite. Joints may be open fractures or filled by various materials. Joints infilled by precipitated minerals are called veins and joints filled by solidified magma are called dikes.

== Formation ==
Joints arise from brittle fracture of a rock or layer due to tensile stress. This stress may be imposed from outside; for example, by the stretching of layers, the rise of pore fluid pressure, or shrinkage caused by the cooling or desiccation of a rock body or layer whose outside boundaries remained fixed.

When tensional stresses stretch a body or layer of rock such that its tensile strength is exceeded, it breaks. When this happens the rock fractures in a plane parallel to the maximum principal stress and perpendicular to the minimum principal stress (the direction in which the rock is being stretched). This leads to the development of a single sub-parallel joint set. Continued deformation may lead to development of one or more additional joint sets. The presence of the first set strongly affects the stress orientation in the rock layer, often causing subsequent sets to form at a high angle, often 90°, to the first set.

== Types ==
Joints are classified by their geometry or by the processes that formed them.

=== By geometry ===
The geometry of joints refers to the orientation of joints as either plotted on stereonets and rose-diagrams or observed in rock exposures. In terms of geometry, three major types of joints are recognized: columnar jointing, systematic joints, and nonsystematic joints.

==== Columnar ====
Columnar jointing is distinguished by triple joint junction points, which split a rock body into long prisms or columns, hence the name. Typically, the joint planes are oriented at or about 120° angles, and so columns are usually hexagonal in section, although 3-, 4-, 5- and 7-sided columns are relatively common.

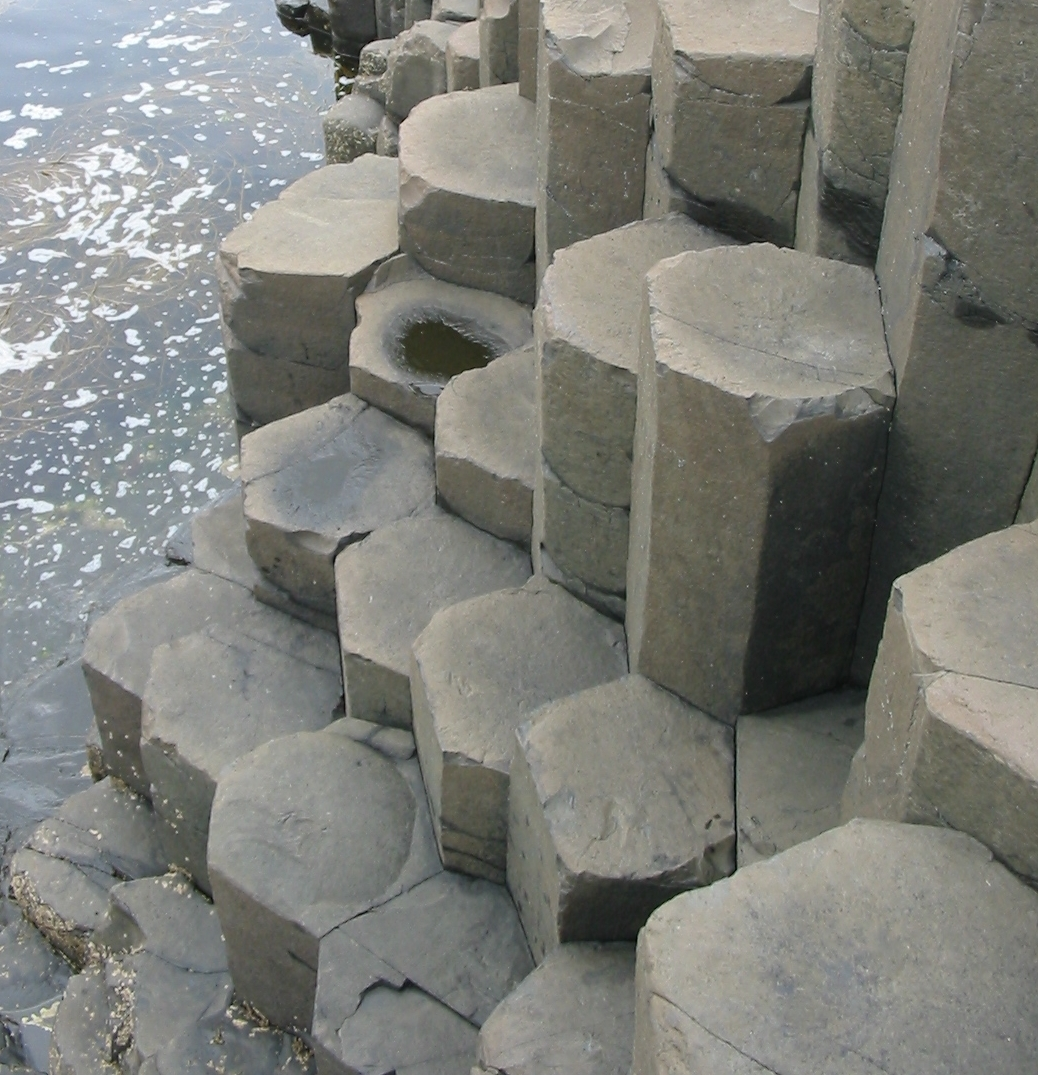
Columnar jointing in Giant's Causeway in Northern Ireland.

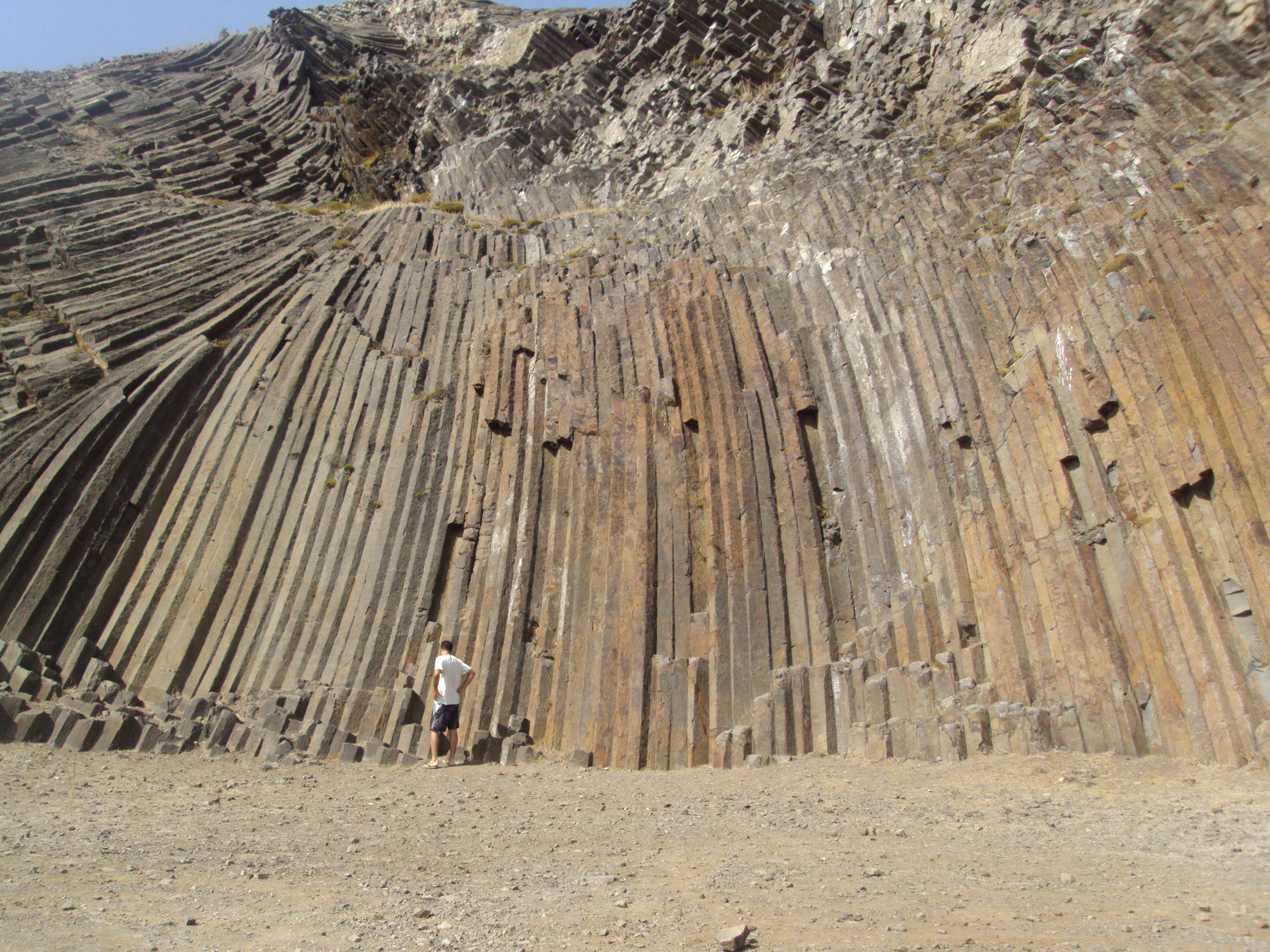
Basalt columns in Porto Santo Island, Madeira.

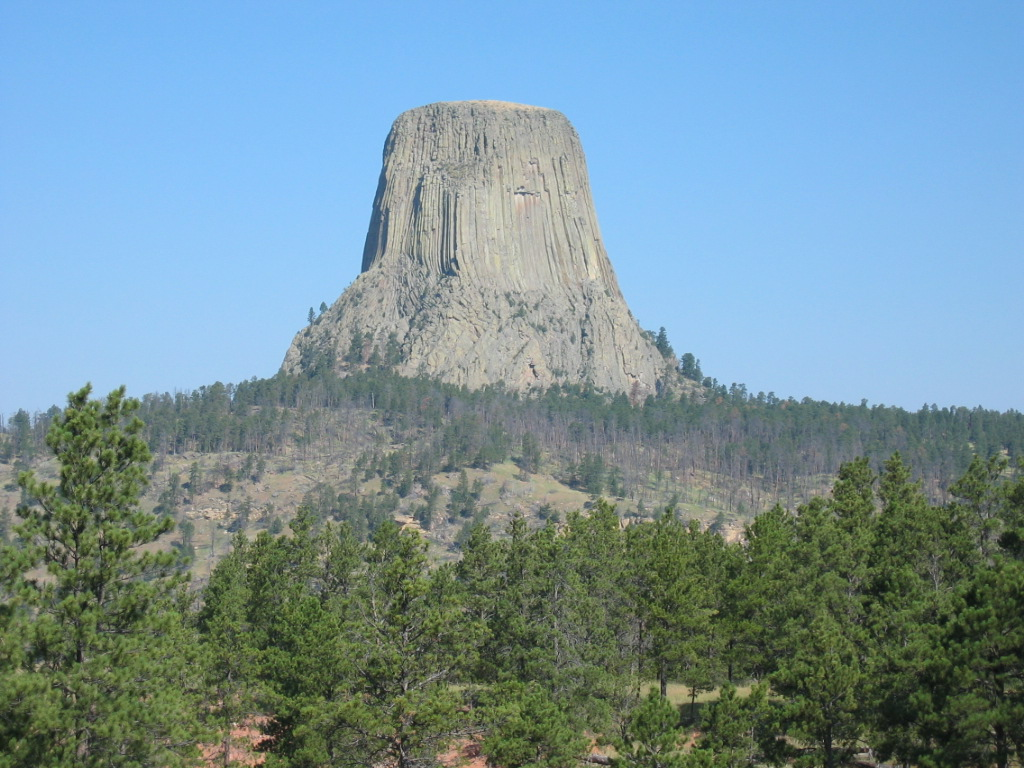
The columnar joints that make up Devils Tower, Wyoming

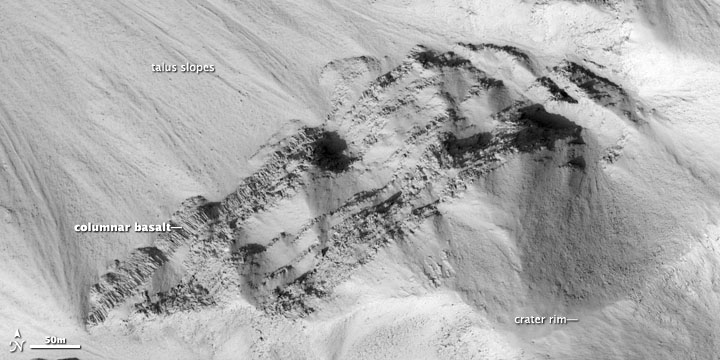
Columnar jointing in basalt, Marte Vallis, Mars.

Columnar jointing is typical of thick lava flows, and shallow dikes and sills, but rare cases of columnar jointing have also been reported in sedimentary strata. The width of these prismatic columns ranges from a few centimeters to several metres, and they are often oriented perpendicular to surfaces of contact between the igneous rock and its cooler surroundings. They can thus usually be seen at the top and base surfaces of lava flows, and the contacts of tabular igneous intrusions with the surrounding rock.
Columnar jointing is also known as either columnar structure, prismatic joints, or prismatic jointing

==== Systematic ====
Systematic joints are planar, parallel, joints that can be traced for some distance, and occur at regularly, evenly spaced distances on the order of centimeters, meters, tens of meters, or even hundreds of meters. As a result, they occur as families of joints that form recognizable joint sets. Typically, exposures or outcrops within a given area or region of study contains two or more sets of systematic joints, each with its own distinctive properties such as orientation and spacing, that intersect to form well-defined joint systems.

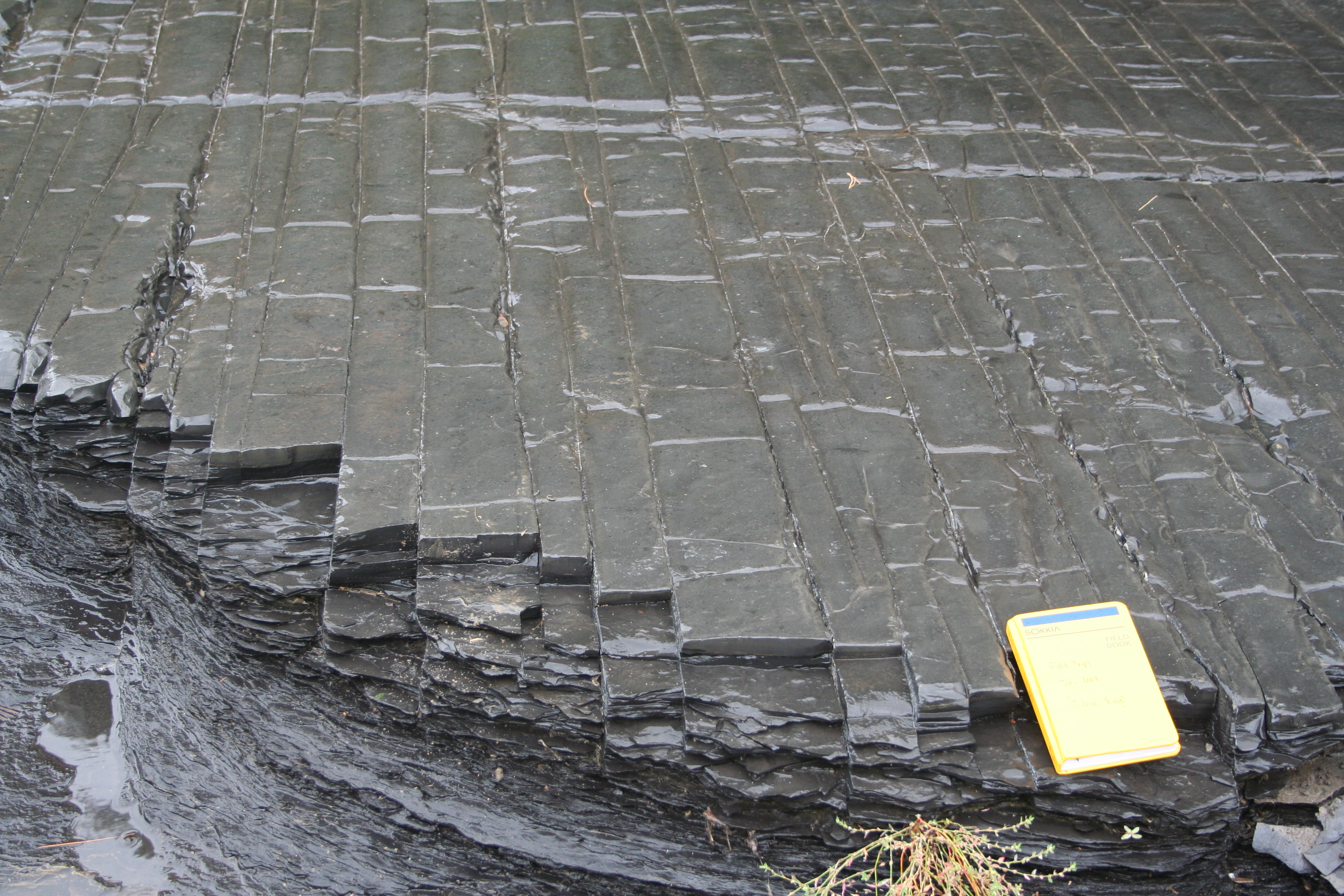
Rectangular joints in siltstone and black shale within the Utica Shale (Ordovician) near Fort Plain, New York.

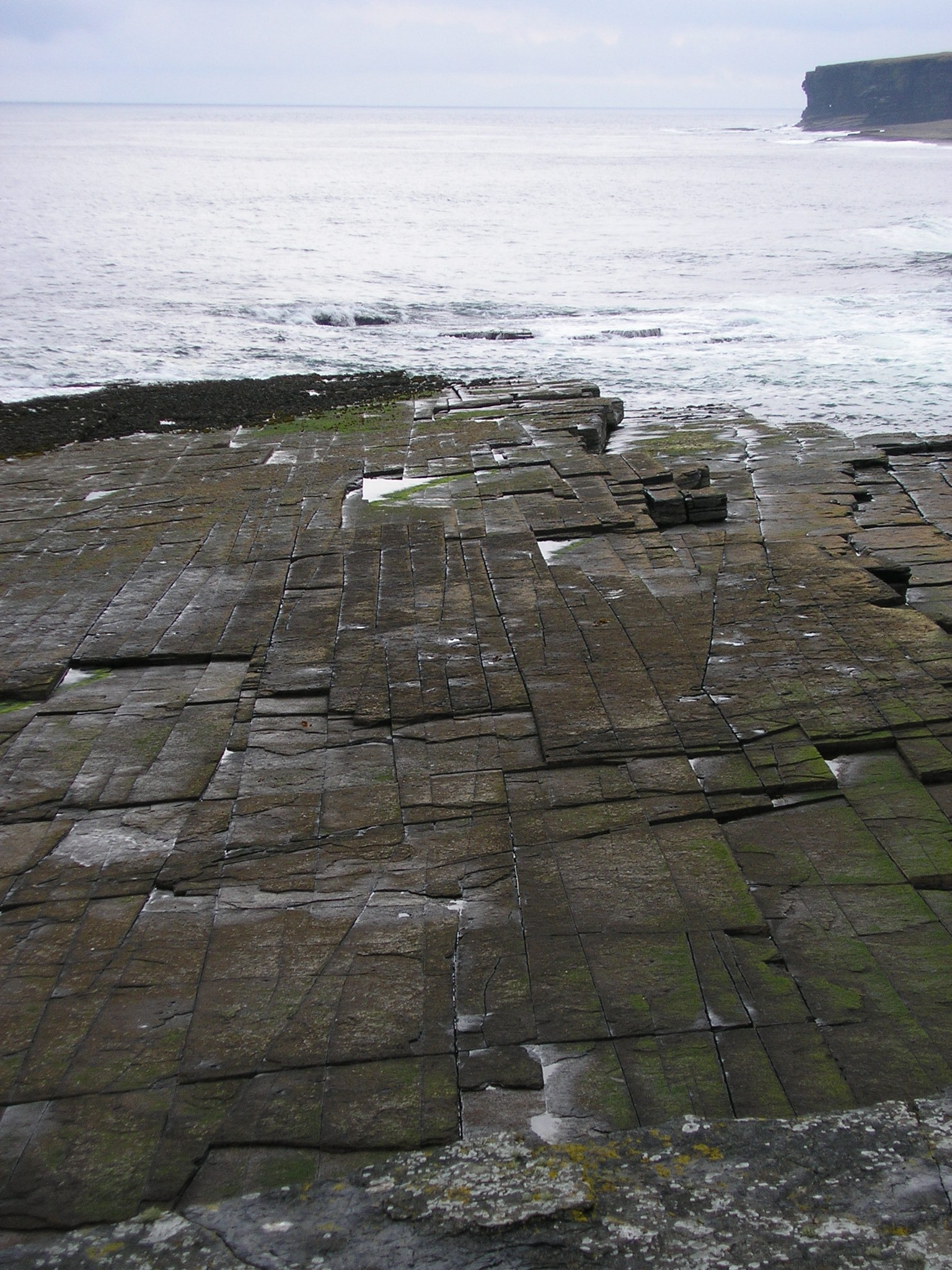
Orthogonal joint sets on a bedding plane in flagstones, Caithness, Scotland.

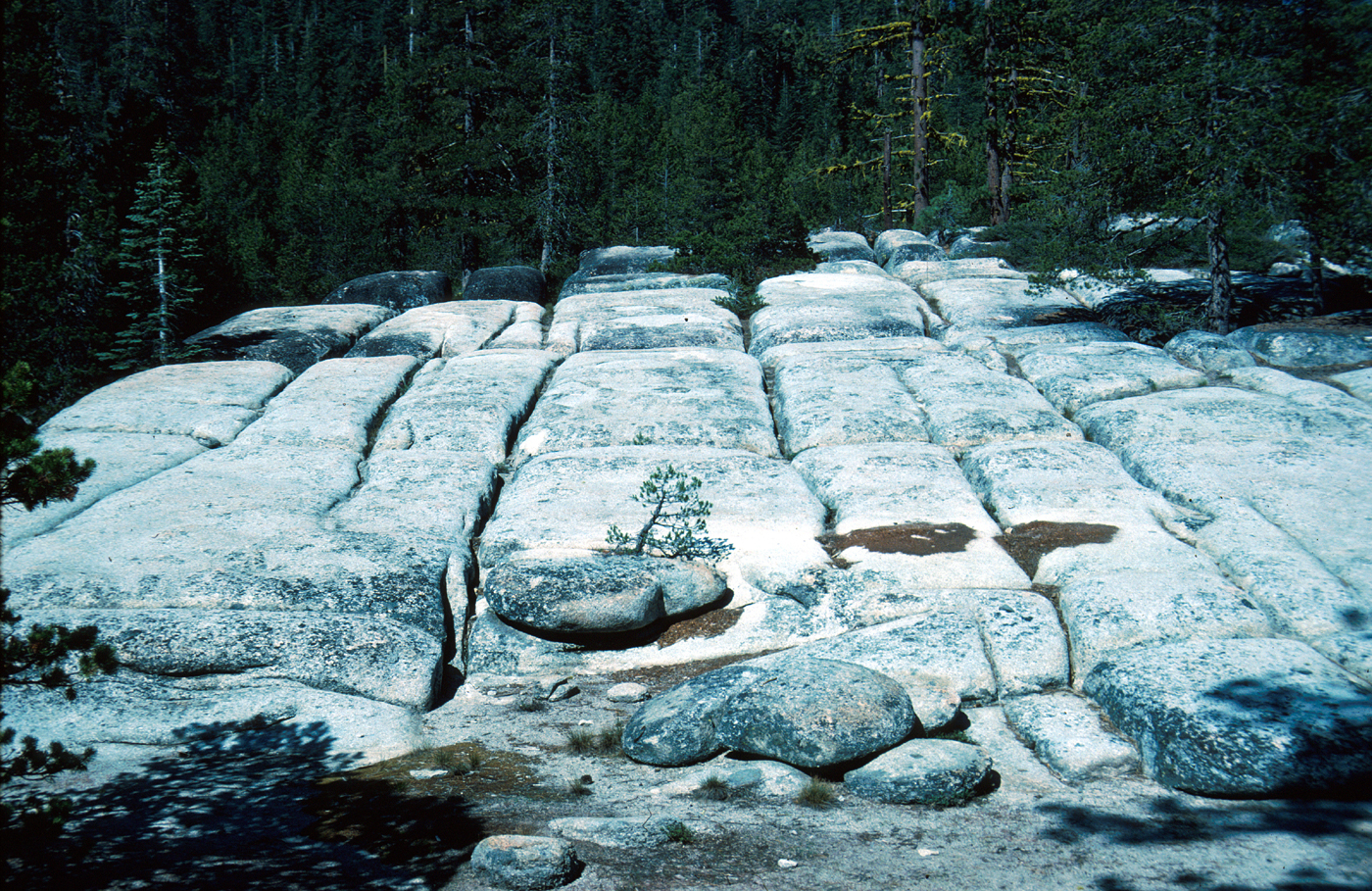
Rectangular blocks formed in El Capitan Granite by intersecting joints (orthogonal jointing - orthogonal cross joints)

Based upon the angle at which joint sets of systematic joints intersect to form a joint system, systematic joints can be subdivided into conjugate and orthogonal joint sets. The angles at which joint sets within a joint system commonly intersect are called dihedral angles by structural geologists. When the dihedral angles are nearly 90° within a joint system, the joint sets are known as orthogonal joint sets. When the dihedral angles are from 30 to 60° within a joint system, the joint sets are known as conjugate joint sets.

Within regions that have experienced tectonic deformation, systematic joints are typically associated with either layered or bedded strata that have been folded into anticlines and synclines. Such joints can be classified according to their orientation in respect to the axial planes of the folds as they often commonly form in a predictable pattern with respect to the hinge trends of folded strata. Based upon their orientation to the axial planes and axes of folds, the types of systematic joints are:

- Longitudinal joints – Joints which are roughly parallel to fold axes and often fan around the fold.
- Cross-joints – Joints which are approximately perpendicular to fold axes.
- Diagonal joints – Joints which typically occur as conjugate joint sets that trend oblique to the fold axes.
- Strike joints – Joints which trend parallel to the strike of the axial plane of a fold.
- Cross-strike joints – Joints which cut across the axial plane of a fold.

==== Nonsystematic ====
Nonsystematic joints are joints that are so irregular in form, spacing, and orientation that they cannot be readily grouped into distinctive, through-going joint sets.

=== By formation ===
Joints can be classified according to their origin, under the labels of tectonics, hydraulics, exfoliation, unloading (release), and cooling. Different authors have proposed contradictory hypotheses for the same joint sets and types. And, joints in the same outcrop may form at different times under varied circumstances.

==== Tectonic ====
Tectonic joints are joints formed when the relative displacement of the joint walls is normal to its plane as the result of brittle deformation of bedrock in response to regional or local tectonic deformation of bedrock. Such joints form when directed tectonic stress causes the tensile strength of bedrock to be exceeded as the result of the stretching of rock layers under conditions of elevated pore fluid pressure and directed tectonic stress. Tectonic joints often reflect local tectonic stresses associated with local folding and faulting. Tectonic joints occur as both nonsystematic and systematic joints, including orthogonal and conjugate joint sets.

==== Hydraulic ====
Hydraulic joints are formed when pore fluid pressure becomes elevated as a result of vertical gravitational loading. In simple terms, the accumulation of either sediments, volcanic, or other material causes an increase in the pore pressure of groundwater and other fluids in the underlying rock when they cannot move either laterally or vertically in response to this pressure. This also causes an increase in pore pressure in preexisting cracks that increases the tensile stress on them perpendicular to the minimum principal stress (the direction in which the rock is being stretched). If the tensile stress exceeds the magnitude of the least principal compressive stress the rock will fail in a brittle manner and these cracks propagate in a process called hydraulic fracturing. Hydraulic joints occur as both nonsystematic and systematic joints, including orthogonal and conjugate joint sets. In some cases, joint sets can be a tectonic - hydraulic hybrid.

==== Exfoliation ====
Exfoliation joints are sets of flat-lying, curved, and large joints that are restricted to massively exposed rock faces in a deeply eroded landscape. Exfoliation jointing consists of fan-shaped fractures varying from a few meters to tens of meters in size that lie sub-parallel to the topography. The vertical, gravitational load of the mass of a mountain-size bedrock mass drives longitudinal splitting and causes outward buckling toward the free air. In addition, paleostress sealed in the granite before the granite was exhumed by erosion and released by exhumation and canyon cutting is also a driving force for the actual spalling.

==== Unloading ====
Unloading joints or release joints arise near the surface when bedded sedimentary rocks are brought closer to the surface during uplift and erosion; when they cool, they contract and become relaxed elastically. A stress builds up which eventually exceeds the tensile strength of the bedrock and results in jointing. In the case of unloading joints, compressive stress is released either along preexisting structural elements (such as cleavage) or perpendicular to the former direction of tectonic compression.

==== Cooling ====
Cooling joints are columnar joints that result from the cooling of either lava from the exposed surface of a lava lake or flood basalt flow or the sides of a tabular igneous, typically basaltic, intrusion. They exhibit a pattern of joints that join together at triple junctions either at or about 120° angles. They split a rock body into long, prisms or columns that are typically hexagonal, although 3-, 4-, 5- and 7-sided columns are relatively common. They form as a result of a cooling front that moves from some surface, either the exposed surface of a lava lake or flood basalt flow or the sides of a tabular igneous intrusion into either lava of the lake or lava flow or magma of a dike or sill.

== Fractography ==
Joint propagation can be studied through the techniques of fractography in which characteristic marks such as hackles and plumose structures are used to determine propagation directions and, in some cases, the principal stress orientations.

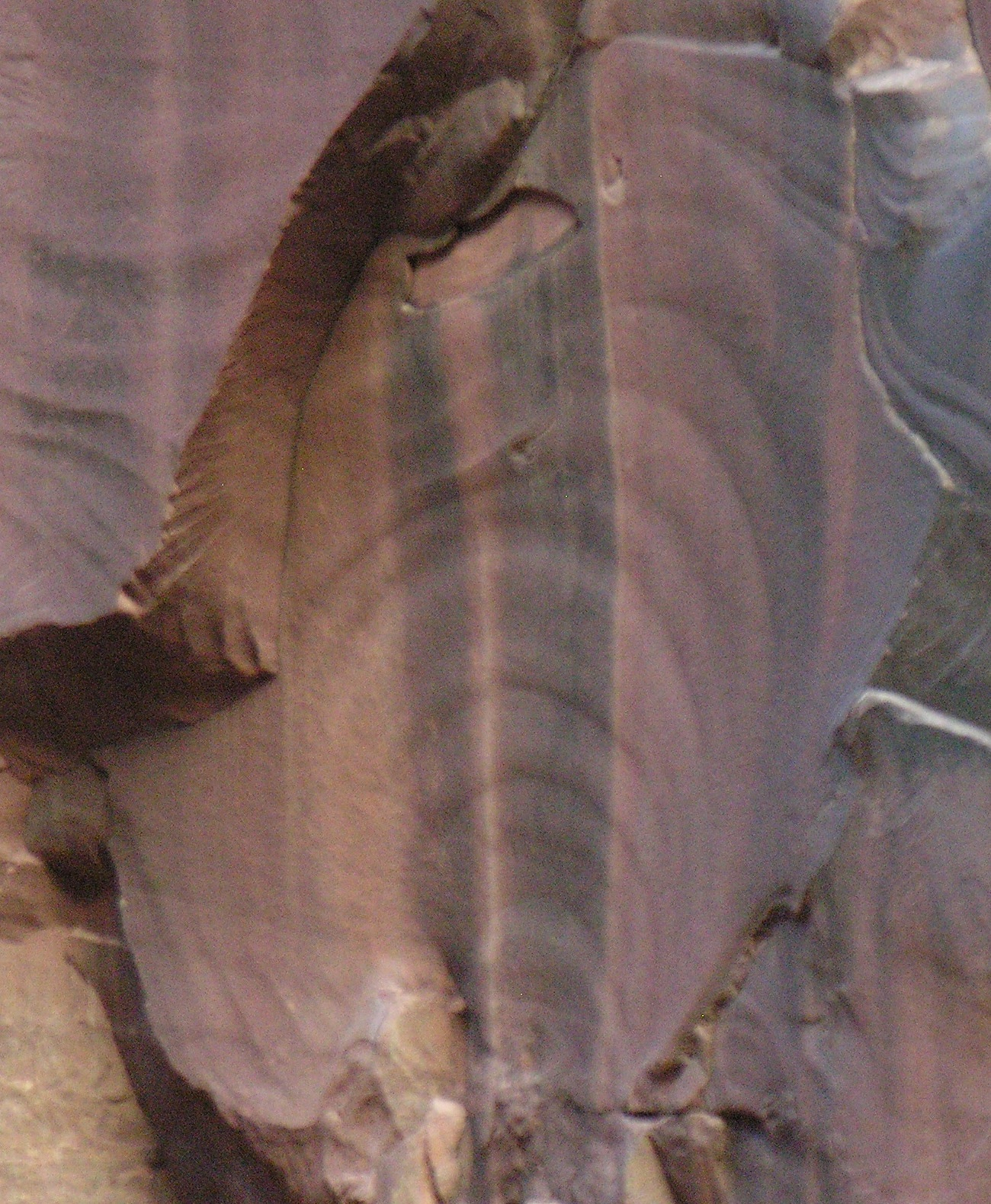
Plumose structure on a fracture surface in sandstone, Arizona.

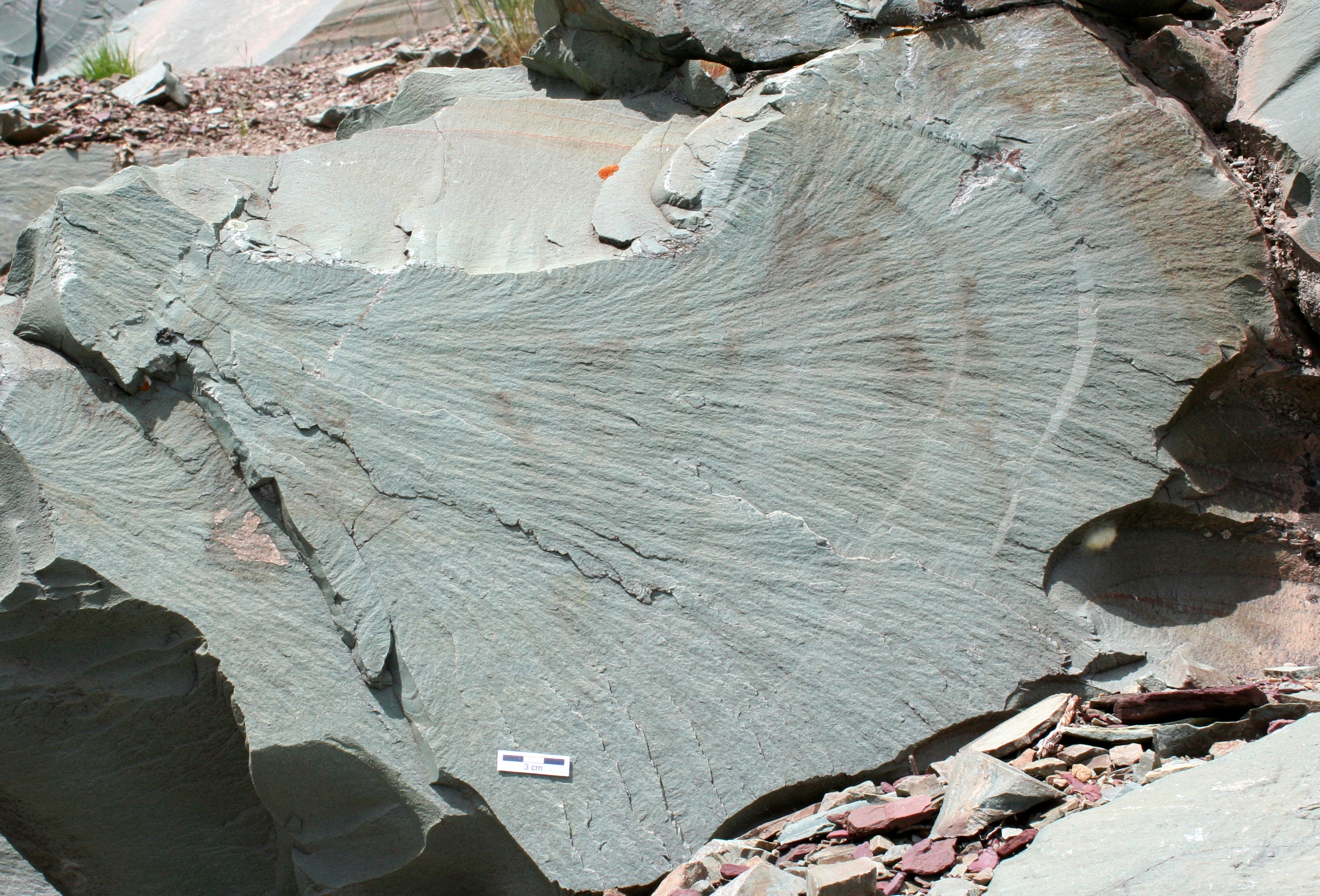
Detail of plumose fracture.

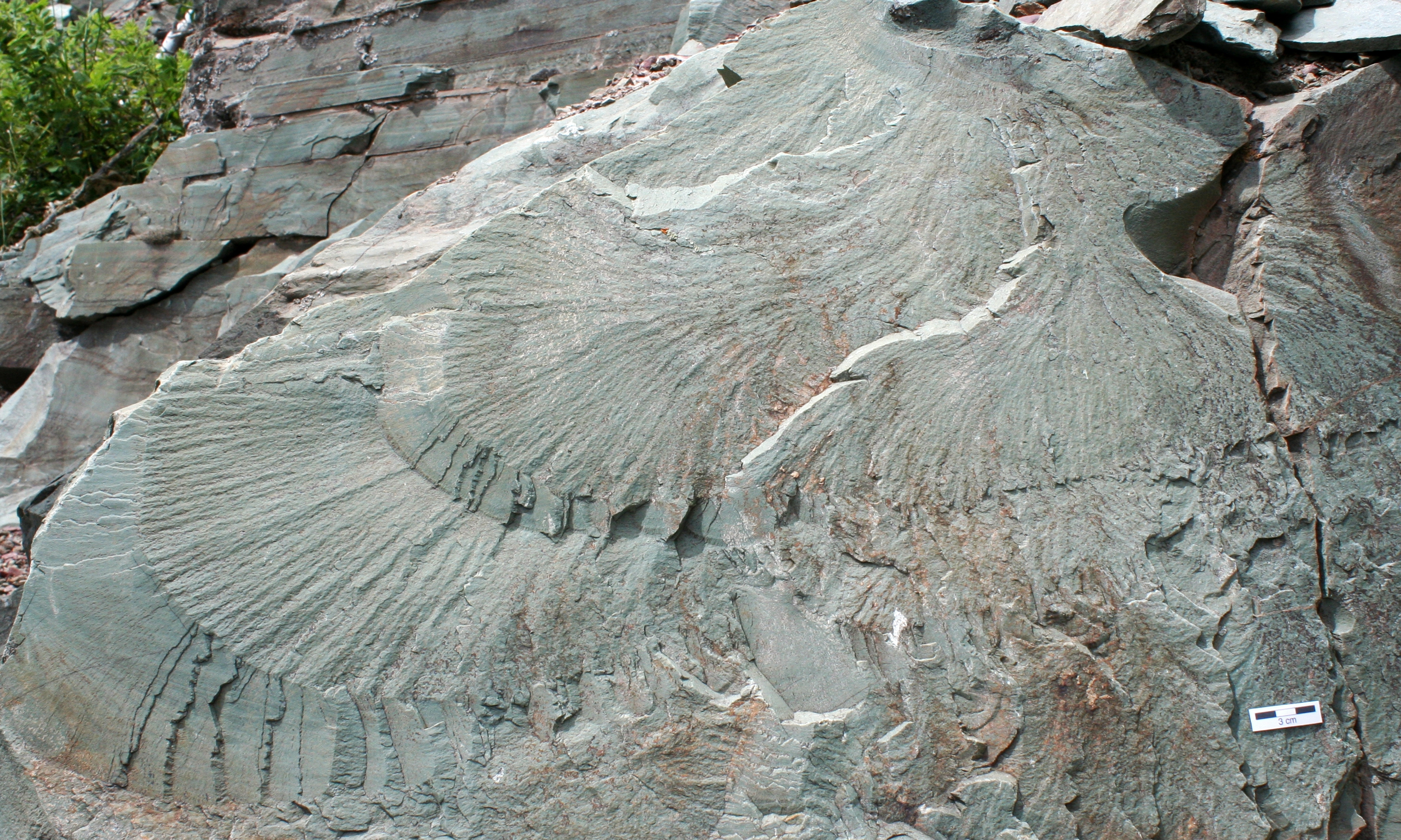
Detail of plumose fracture.

== Shear fractures ==
Some fractures that look like joints are actually shear fractures, which in effect are microfaults. They do not form as the result of the perpendicular opening of a fracture due to tensile stress, but through the shearing of fractures that causes lateral movement of the faces. Shear fractures can be confused with joints because the lateral offset of the fracture faces is not visible in the outcrop or in a specimen. Because of the absence of diagnostic ornamentation or the lack of any discernible movement or offset, they can be indistinguishable from joints. Such fractures occur in planar parallel sets at an angle of 60 degrees and can be of the same size and scale as joints. As a result, some "conjugate joint sets" might actually be shear fractures. Shear fractures are distinguished from joints by the presence of slickensides, the products of shearing movement parallel to the fracture surface. The slickensides are fine-scale, delicate ridge-in-groove lineations on the surface of fracture surfaces.

== Importance ==
Joints are important not only in understanding the local and regional geology and geomorphology but also in developing natural resources, in the safe design of structures, and in environmental protection. Joints have a profound control on weathering and erosion of bedrock. As a result, they exert a strong control on how topography and morphology of landscapes develop. Understanding the local and regional distribution, physical character, and origin of joints is a significant part of understanding the geology and geomorphology of an area. Joints often impart a well-develop fracture-induced permeability to bedrock. As a result, joints strongly influence, even control, the natural circulation (hydrogeology) of fluids, e.g. groundwater and pollutants within aquifers, petroleum in reservoirs, and hydrothermal circulation at depth, within bedrock. Thus, joints are important to the economic and safe development of petroleum, hydrothermal, and groundwater resources and the subject of intensive research relative to these resources. Regional and local joint systems exert a strong control on how ore-forming hydrothermal fluids (consisting largely of H_{2}O, CO_{2}, and NaCl — which formed most of Earth's ore deposits) circulated within its crust. As a result, understanding their genesis, structure, chronology, and distribution is an important part of finding and profitably developing ore deposits. Finally, joints often form discontinuities that may have a large influence on the mechanical behavior (strength, deformation, etc.) of soil and rock masses in, for example, tunnel, foundation, or slope construction. As a result, joints are an important part of geotechnical engineering in practice and research.

== Image gallery ==
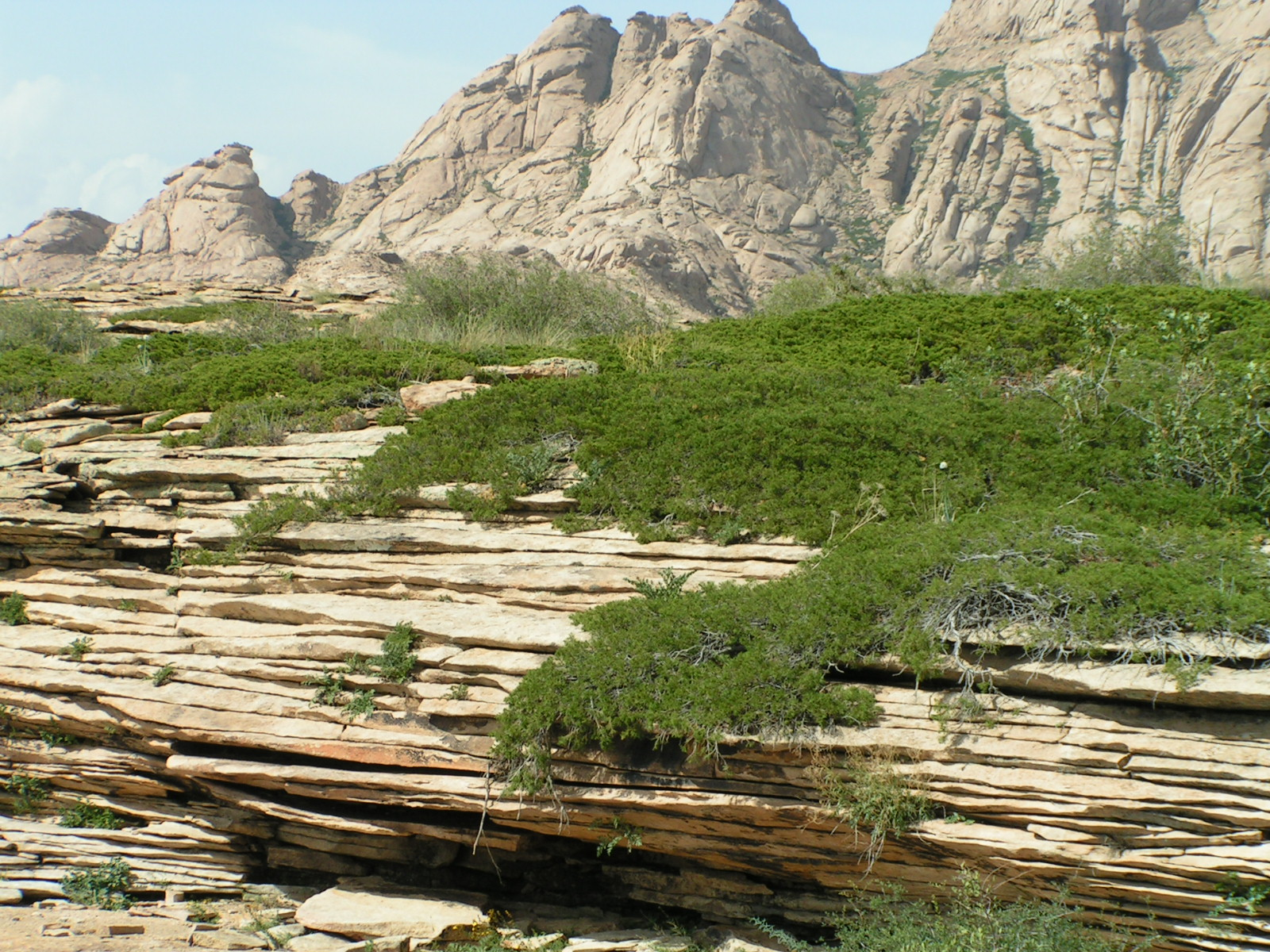
Horizontal joints in the sedimentary rocks of the foreground and a more varied set of joints in the granitic rocks in the background. Image from the Kazakh Uplands in Balkhash District, Kazakhstan.

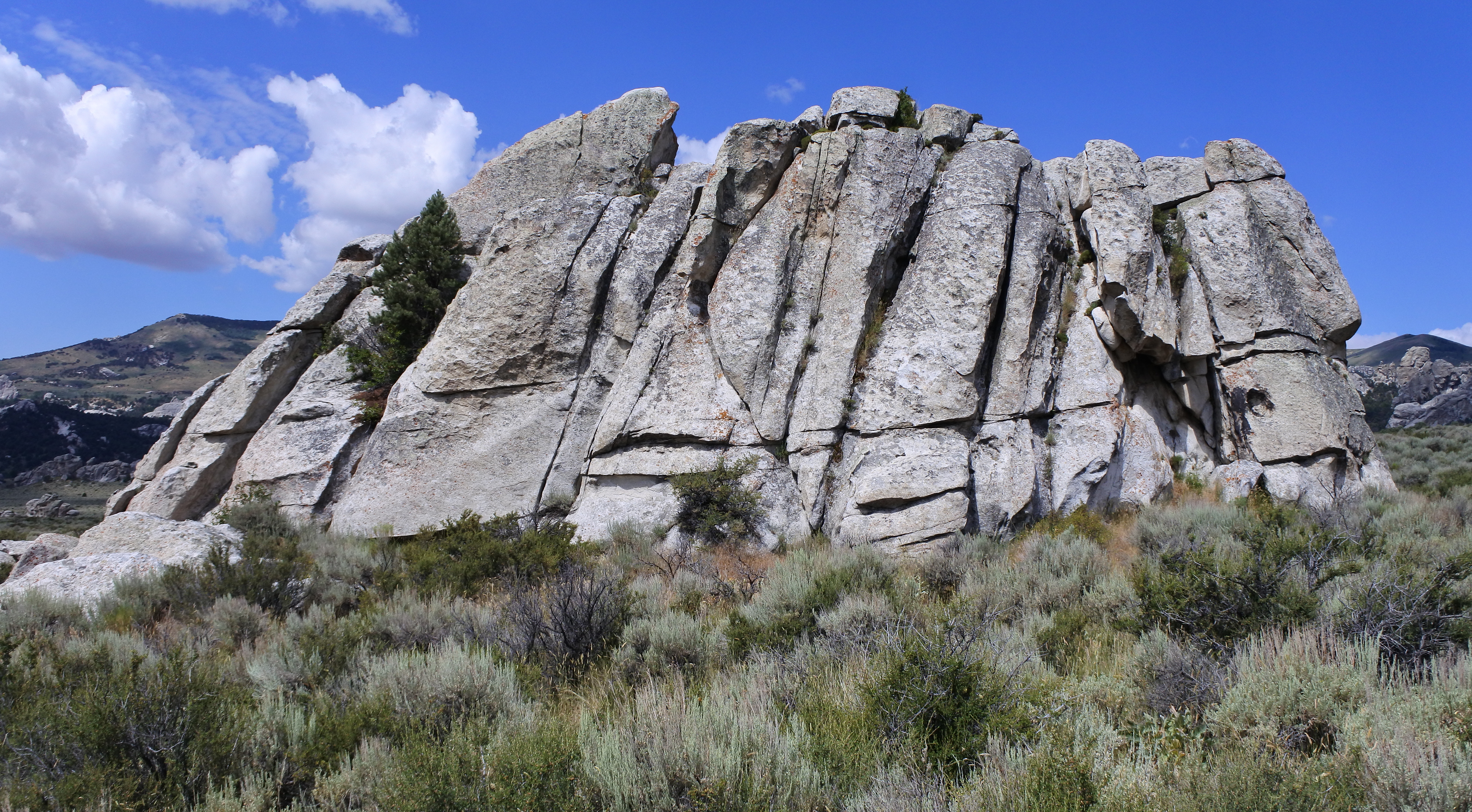
Joints in the Almo Pluton, City of Rocks National Reserve, Idaho.

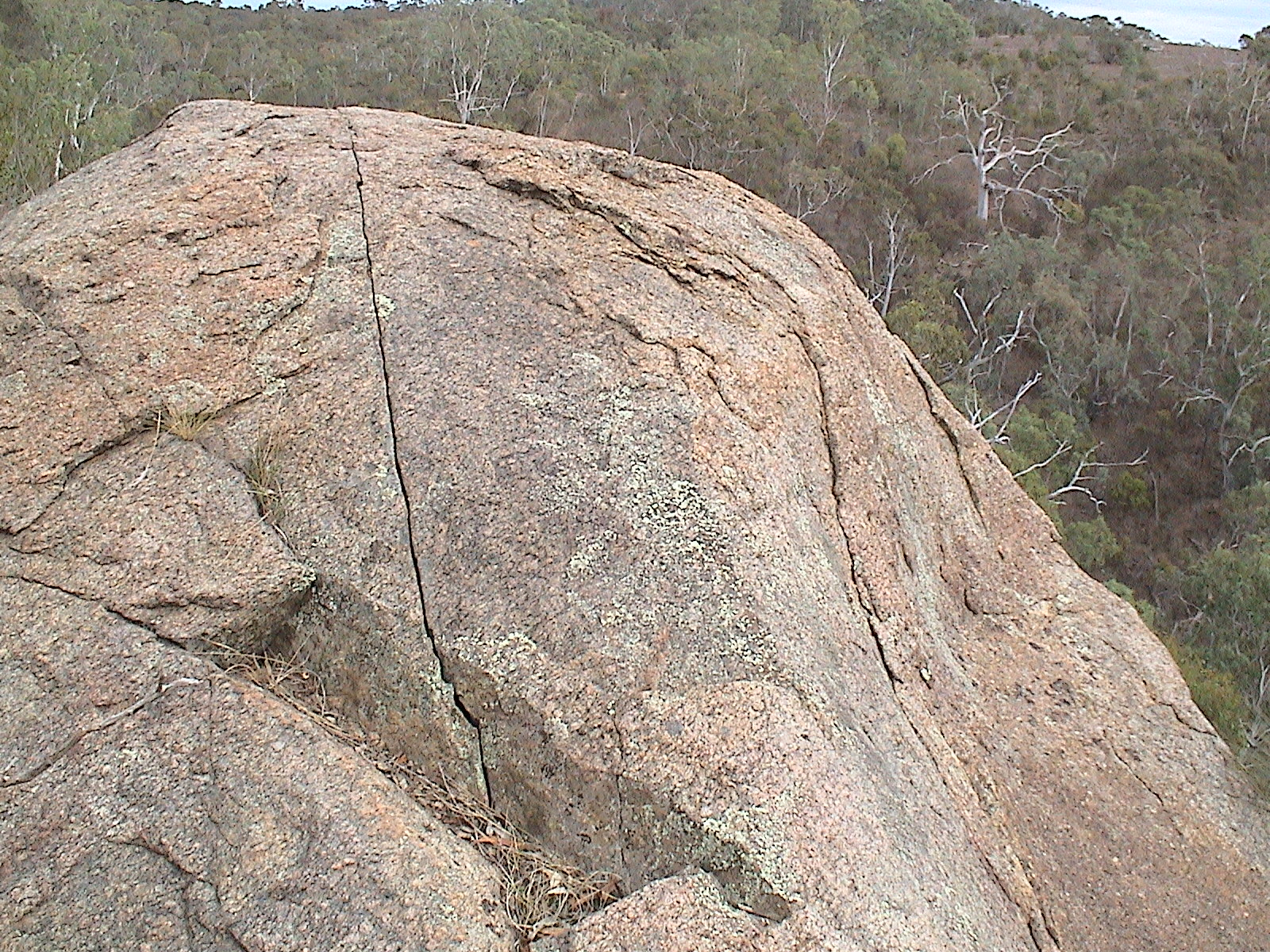
Recent tectonic joint intersects older exfoliation joints in granite gneiss, Lizard Rock, Parra Wirra, South Australia.

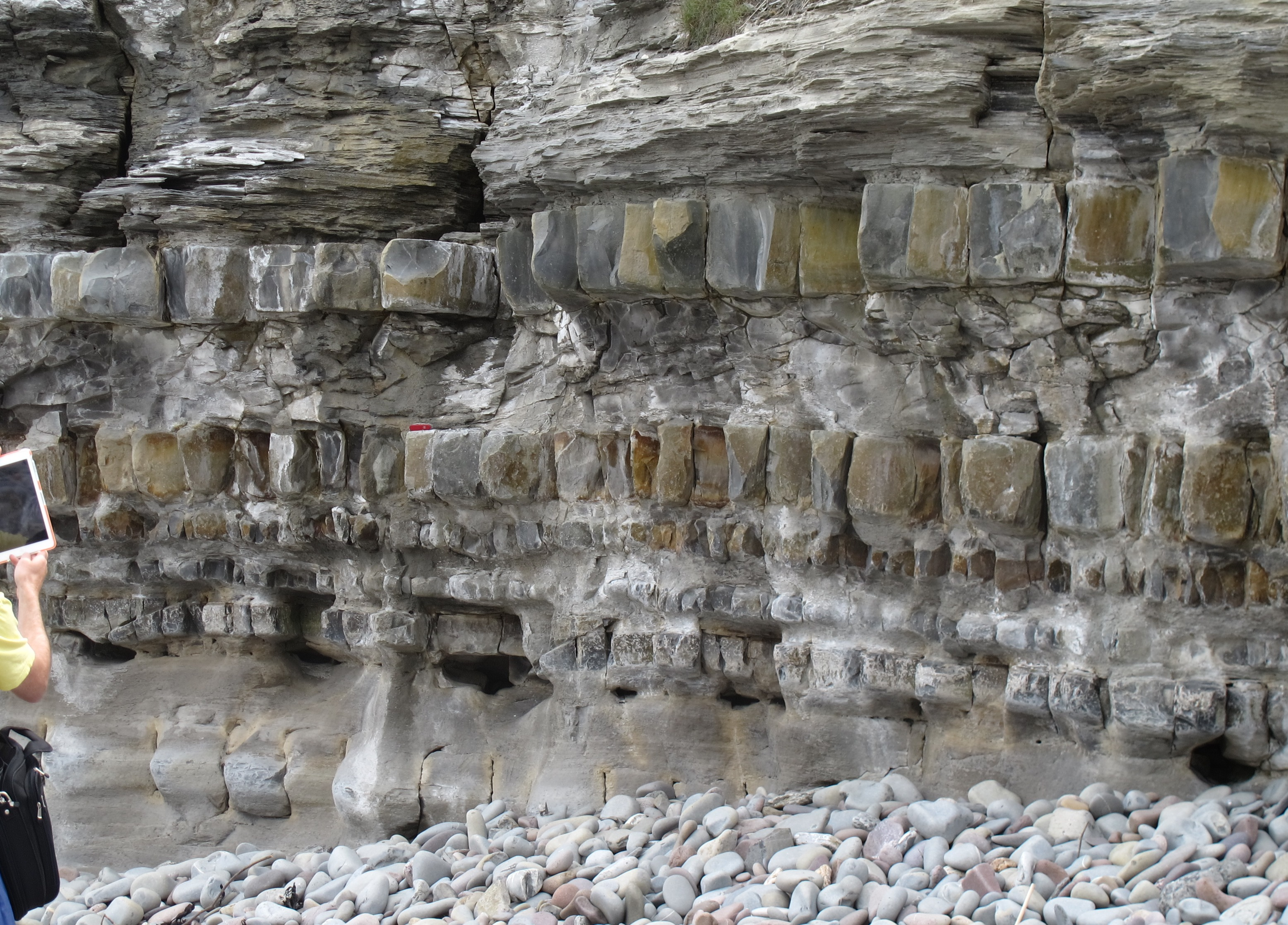
Joint spacing in mechanically stronger limestone beds shows increase with bed thickness, Lilstock Bay, Somerset.

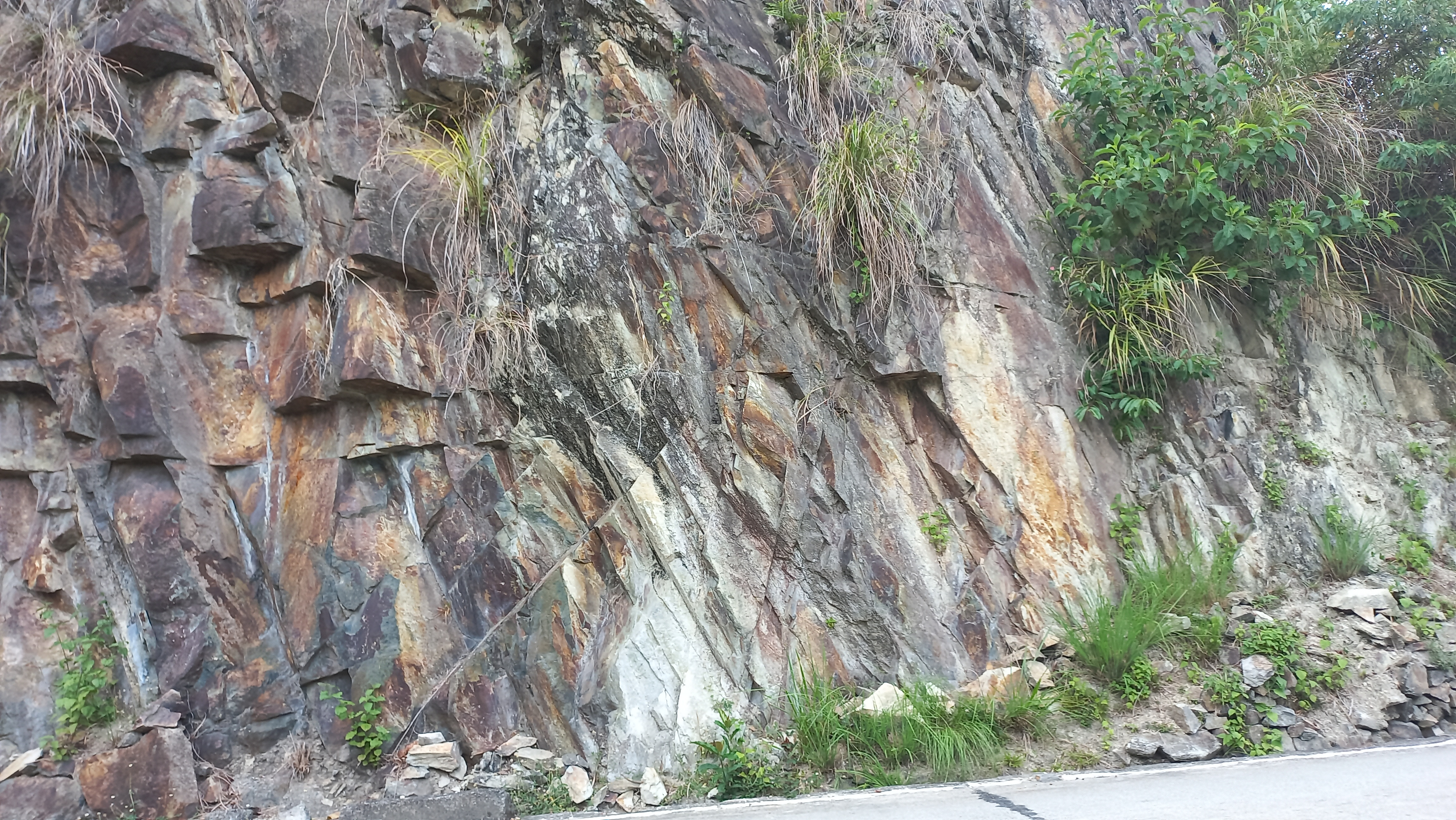
Roadside weathered diorite outcrop showing joints. Baguio-Bua-Itogon Road, Philippines

== See also ==
- Basalt fan structure – Formation of columnar jointed igneous rock
- Exfoliating granite – Granite spalling in superficial layers due to tempearature cycles
- Tessellated pavement – Relatively flat rock surface that is subdivided into more or less regular shapes by fractures
