= Skjálfandafljót =

River in Iceland

Coordinates: 65°59′N 17°38′W

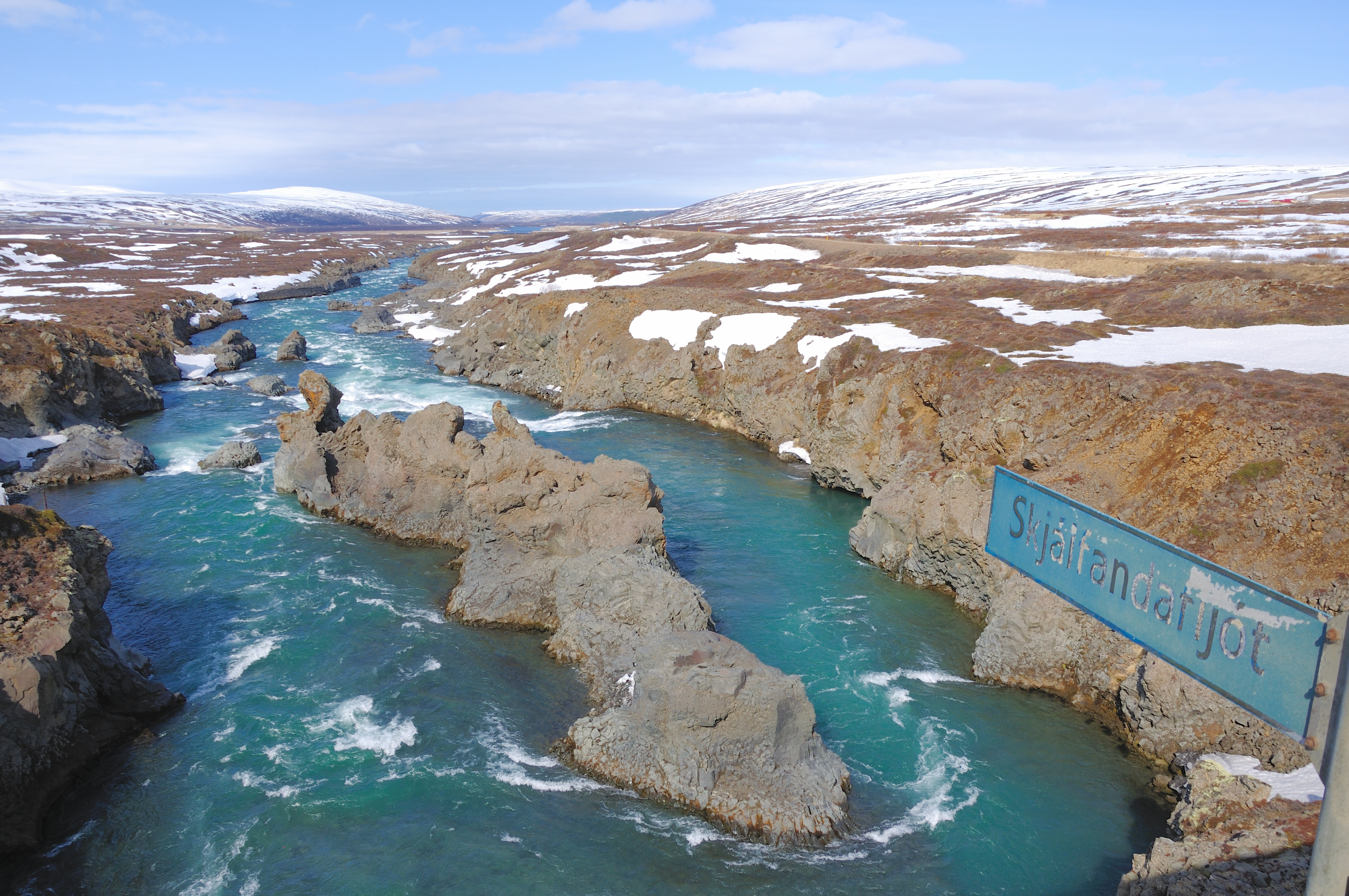
Skjálfandafljót seen from the Ring road.

The Skjálfandafljót River (Icelandic pronunciation: [ˈscaulvantaˌfljouːt]) is situated in the north of Iceland. Skjálfandafljót is 178 kilometres (111 mi) long, and is the fourth longest river of Iceland.

It has its source at the northwestern border of the icecap Vatnajökull on the Highlands of Iceland. From there it streams parallel to the Sprengisandur Highland road in a northern direction, flowing finally into Skjálfandi bay.

By following the river from its source at the Vatnajökull glacier all the way to the river mouth at Skjálfandi bay it's possible to see many waterfalls. Skjálfandafljót possesses a number of waterfalls, including Goðafoss. Other well-known waterfalls in Skjálfandafljót include Hrafnabjargafoss, Aldeyjarfoss, Barnafoss and Ullarfoss. 1

It was first descended by kayak by a team from the University of Sheffield (UK) in 1989.

At the north end of the Sprengisandur road, the river drops down 10m over Aldeyjarfoss. Goðafoss is in the lowlands, very near Route 1.

There have been proposals to build a hydroelectricity power station along the river.

== Gallery ==
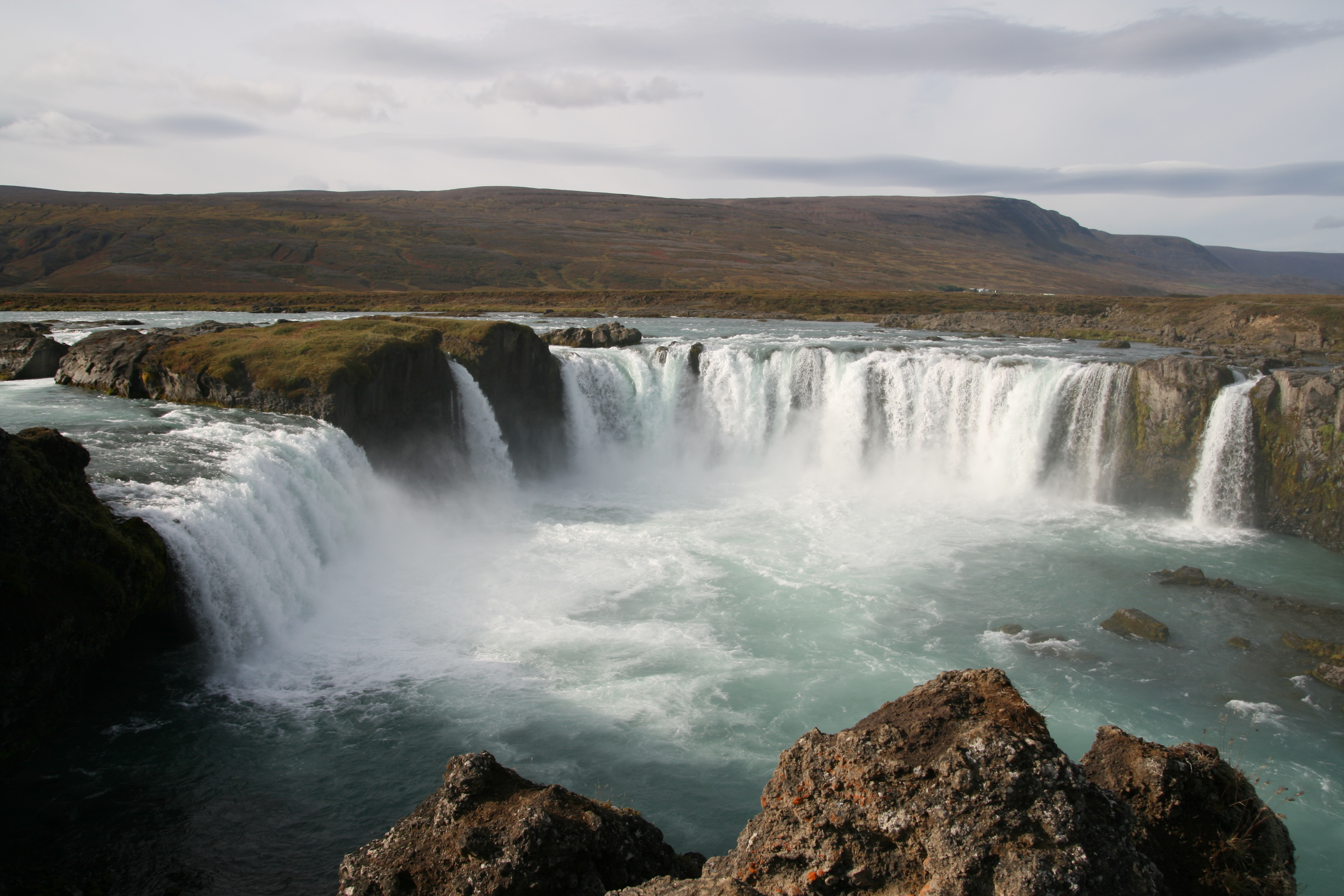
Goðafoss

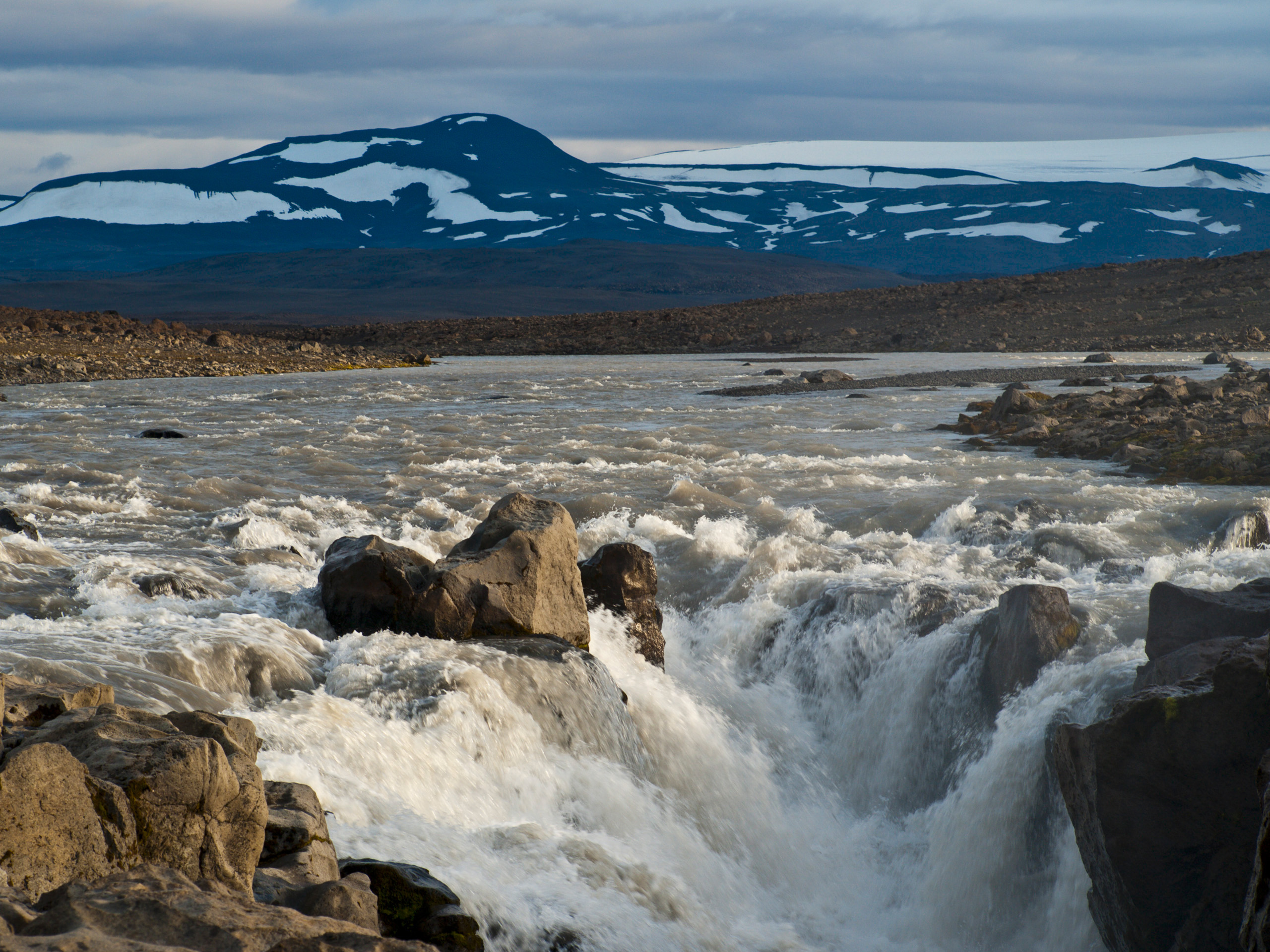
The upper course of the Skjálfandafljót

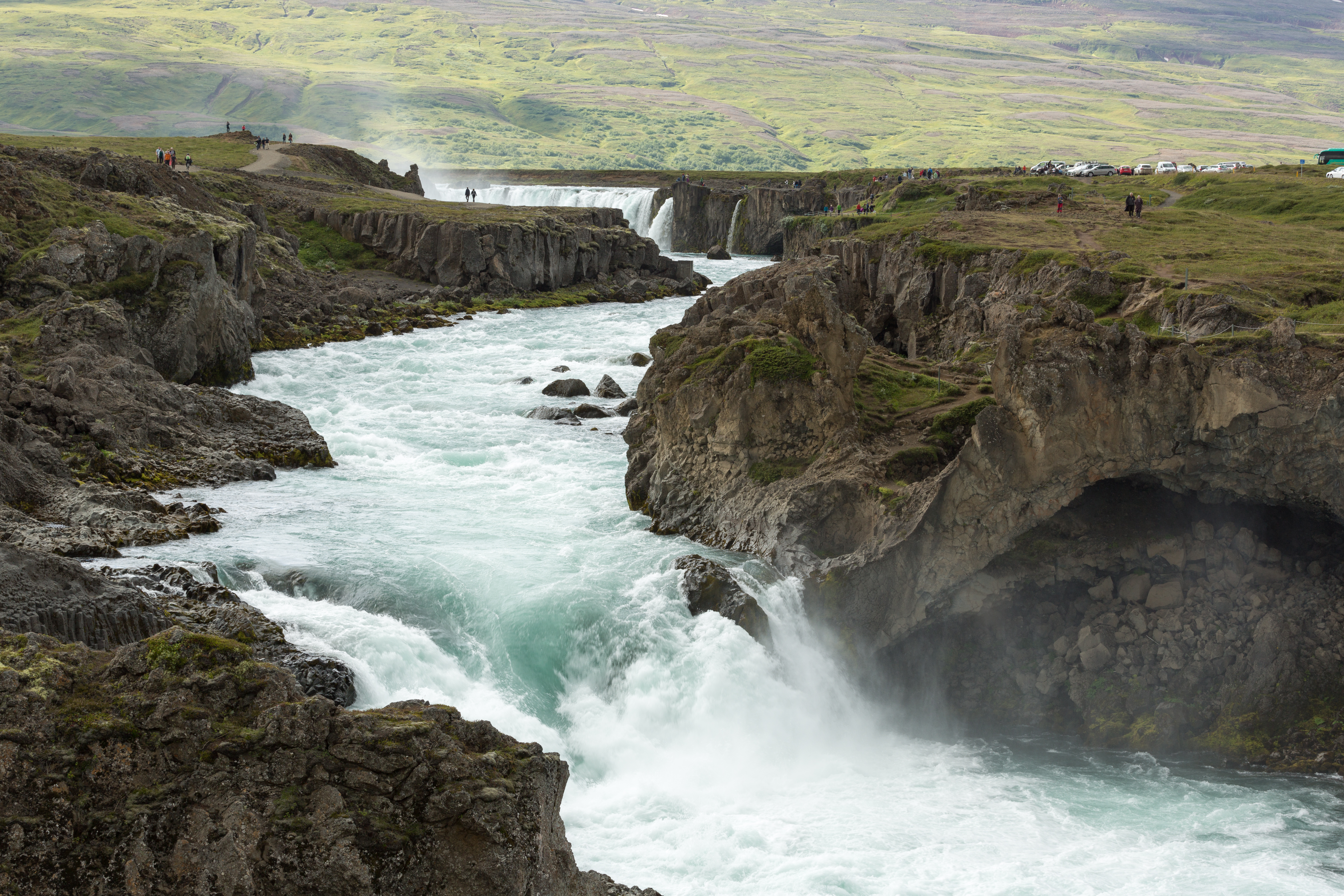
Skjálfandafljót from Route 1

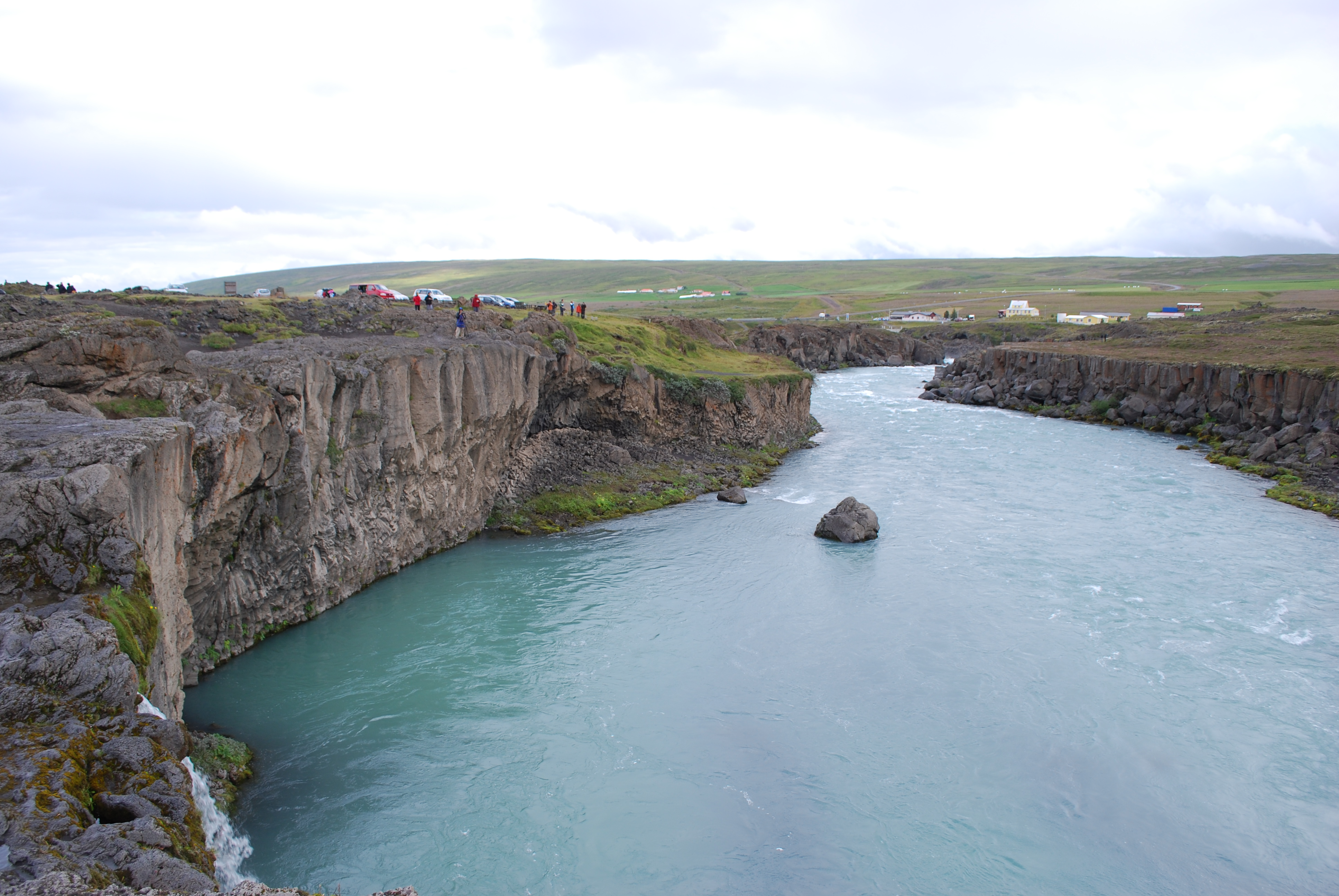
Near Goðafoss

== See also ==
- List of rivers of Iceland
- Waterfalls of Iceland
