= Aldeyjarfoss =

Waterfall in Iceland

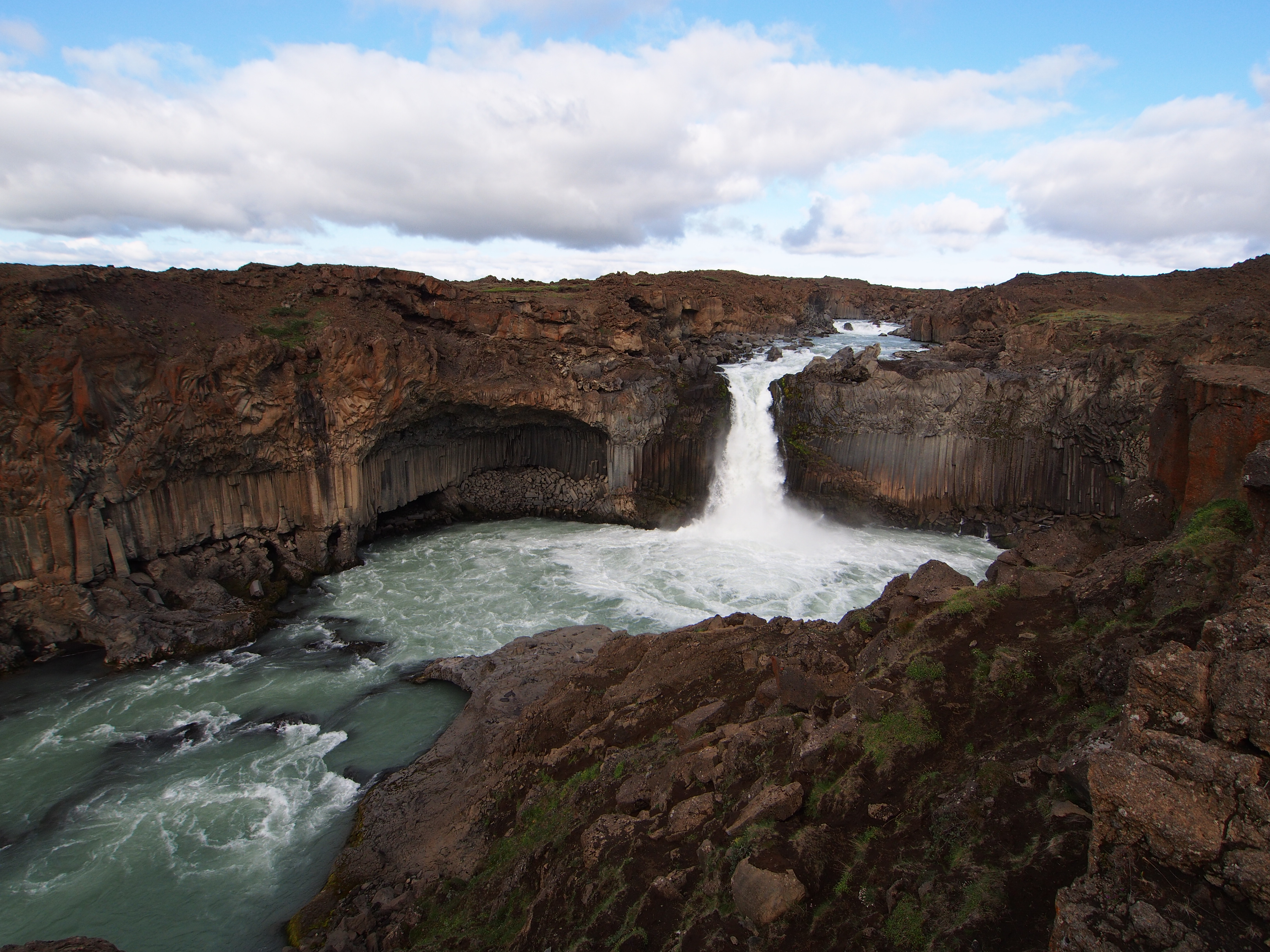
- Aerial panorama of Aldeyjarfoss

- Location within Iceland
- Location: North of Iceland
- Coordinates: 65°21′57.60″N 17°20′52.80″W
- Total height: 20 m (66 ft)
- Number of drops: 1

The Aldeyjarfoss (Icelandic pronunciation: [ˈaltˌeiːjarˌfɔsː]) waterfall is situated in the Highlands of Iceland at the northern part of the Sprengisandur Highland Road. The river Skjálfandafljót drops here from a height of 20m. The columnar jointed basalt belongs to a 9000 years old lava field called Bárðardalshraun, hraun being the Icelandic word for lava.

== See also ==
- Waterfalls of Iceland
- Volcanism of Iceland
- List of waterfalls
- Geography of Iceland
